= Paramount Television Studios =

Television arm of Paramount Pictures

- Logo used since 2026
- Formerly: Paramount Television (second iteration) (2013–2020)
- Type: Division
- Industry: Television
- Predecessors: Desilu Productions; Paramount Television (first incarnation); CBS Paramount Television; Showtime/MTV Entertainment Studios; Showtime Studios; Skydance Television; Awesomeness
- Founded: March 4, 2013; 13 years ago (original); August 8, 2025; 15 months ago (revival)
- Defunct: August 18, 2024; 2 years ago (original)
- Fate: Dissolved (original); Folded into Warner Bros. Television Studios (revival)
- Successor: CBS Studios (original); Warner Bros. Television Studios (revival)
- Headquarters: Hollywood, California, U.S.
- Area served: United States; Worldwide (via Paramount Global Content Distribution)
- Key people: George Cheeks (co-chair & Chief Content Officer, Skydance TV); Matt Thunell (president)
- Products: Television programs
- Owner: Skydance
- Parent: Skydance Television Group
- Subsidiaries: South Park Digital Studios (50%); Nickelodeon Productions; Paramount Global Content Distribution; Paramount Television International Studios
- Website: Official website

Paramount Television Studios, formerly the second incarnation of Paramount Television, is a television production and distribution company of Skydance Television Group a division of Skydance, founded on March 4, 2013, by its predecessor, Viacom, following an emerging vigorous business with the technological expansion of television via streaming services. Paramount also recognized that television could give them little to fall back on when films fail, except for studio stage rentals.

It was the revival and successor to Paramount's first television division, which rebranded as CBS Paramount Television and was kept by CBS Corporation, the new name for the original Viacom, on December 31, 2005 – on that same day, the second Viacom took ownership of Paramount Pictures. After the expiration of a 3-year licensing agreement between the split companies for the "Paramount" trademarks, CBS Paramount Television was rebranded to CBS Television Studios on May 17, 2009 and then currently CBS Studios on October 8, 2020. On January 14, 2020, following the merger of the second Viacom and CBS Corporation, the revived Paramount Television was rebranded as Paramount Television Studios.

On August 13, 2024, following layoffs of much of its staff in a series of cutbacks at Paramount, it was announced that the division would shut down by the end of that week, with any ongoing and development projects shifting to sister company CBS Studios. However, on August 4, 2025, it was announced that Paramount Television Studios would relaunch following the merger of Paramount Global and Skydance Media and the formation of Paramount Skydance Corporation, which completed three days later.

On November 18, 2026, it was announced that Warner Bros. Television Group and Paramount Television Studios would both combine to Warner Bros. Television Studios beginning in early 2027.

== History ==
On March 4, 2013, then-president and then-CEO of Viacom Philippe Dauman announced that Paramount opted to produce a television series based on one of their films. The show would allow Paramount to “get back, with very little investment, into the television production business.” Hours later, Paramount chairman/CEO Brad Grey announced that the studio was co-producing a CBS television series based on Beverly Hills Cop with Sony Pictures Television; however, the pilot did not move forward.

On July 22, 2013, Amy Powell was named president of Paramount Television. Until the re-merger of CBS Corporation and Viacom on December 4, 2019, the revived Paramount Television had no ties to the CBS network unlike the previous incarnation in its later years before the Viacom/CBS split. In addition, shows produced by the revived Paramount Television are distributed on home media by Paramount Home Entertainment under the main Paramount brand, while shows produced by the original Paramount Television are released through CBS Home Entertainment due to CBS Studios owning the pre-2005 Paramount Television library.

A television series based on the 2003 film School of Rock was announced to air on Nickelodeon. On August 26, 2014, Paramount Television and HBO announced plans to develop a new series titled Ashecliffe which will serve as a prequel to the 2010 Paramount Pictures film Shutter Island.

On May 27, 2014, Anonymous Content signed a 3-year first-look deal with Paramount Television to produce and distribute scripted programming. On October 23, 2014, Chapter Eleven, the production company of Kyle Killen and Scott Pennington, signed a 2-year deal with Paramount Television and Anonymous Content after Killen left 20th Century Fox Television (now just 20th Television).

On July 14, 2014, Robert Zemeckis, his producing partner Jack Rapke and their production company, Compari Entertainment, signed a 2-year first-look pact with Paramount Television. On January 6, 2017, Paramount Television signed a first-look agreement with Federation Entertainment. On July 19, 2018, Paramount Television fired its president Powell, following reports that several people had "concerns around [Powell's] comments [made in a] professional setting which they believed were inconsistent" with Viacom's and Paramount's values; claims which Powell countered and was considering legal action. On September 5, 2018, she was replaced as Paramount Television president by Nicole Clemens.

Viacom indicated that Paramount Television generated $400 million in revenue and produced 9 series at the end-of-year review in 2018. In 2019, Paramount's chief executive Jim Gianopulos indicated that Paramount Television would have 20 series in production and double its profit. On August 16, 2021, following the rebrand, Auriel Rudnick had signed an overall deal with Paramount Television Studios.

On April 11, 2023, Paramount Television Studios signed a multi-year first-look deal with Brillstein Entertainment Partners.

In 2024, management of Paramount Television Studios was transferred to Paramount Global's fellow CBS Entertainment-owned production subsidiary CBS Studios. On August 13, following two rounds of layoffs at Paramount Global that year which included much of its team, it was announced that Paramount Television Studios would shut down by the end of that week, with current series as well as those in development shifting to CBS Studios instead.

On August 7, 2025, as Paramount Global merged with Skydance Media to form Paramount Skydance Corporation, Paramount Television Studios was revived to house its television production assets following the merger of its former production divisions Showtime/MTV Entertainment Studios and Skydance Television (who formerly co-produced series with Paramount Television Studios such as Reacher) alongside their current & future production states into the revived division who would take over incorporate production content from the former two studios as former Skydance Television president Matt Thunell led the revived division as its president. Skydance Media's CCO and Skydance Television's co-founder Dana Goldberg joined the revived TV production studio Paramount Television Studios as co-chair who would oversee the relaunched TV studios and Showtime/MTV Entertainment Studios' head of scripted Keith Cox had joined the revived television studio Paramount Television Studios as its head of scripted with them interrogate's Showtime/MTV's overall deal with Taylor Sheridan and the latter's joint-venture production subsidiary Antoinette Media.

Two months later in October, following its relaunch, Paramount Television Studios absorbed Nickelodeon Productions and the youth-focused production studio Awesomeness as it would assume Nickelodeon's current production state and Awesomeness' current productions, and their future production slates beginning with upcoming Victorious spin-off series Hollywood Arts, which was originally ordered at Nickelodeon had moved to Netflix as its first Nickelodeon-branded series produced by the revived studio.

A week later, PTVS announced that Skydance Television EVP & physical production Drew Brown had been named Head of Production whilst Skydance Television's EVP, Head of Development Shelley Zimmerman and Carolyn Harris assumed the same roles of alongside former Netflix executive Arturo Reyes as Head of Production Finance. Paramount Television Studios had also appointed former Netflix EMEA VP Mel Rauch to become its Head of Finance while former Skydance Television EVP and Global Head of Production Finance Arturo Reyes became Head of Production Finance at the latter television studio.

On November 18, 2026, it was announced that Warner Bros. Television Group and Paramount Television Studios would both combine to Warner Bros. Television Studios beginning in early 2027.

== Paramount Worldwide Television Licensing & Distribution ==
Paramount Worldwide Television Licensing & Distribution
- Type: Division
- Industry: Television distribution; Broadcast syndication
- Predecessors: Paramount Domestic Television; Paramount International Television; Desilu Productions; CBS Paramount Domestic Television; CBS Paramount International Television
- Founded: March 4, 2013; 13 years ago
- Defunct: December 4, 2019; 6 years ago (de facto); August 18, 2024; 2 years ago (actual)
- Fate: Merged with CBS Studios International to form ViacomCBS Global Distribution Group, which later rebranded as Paramount Global Content Distribution
- Successors: Paramount Pictures Distribution; CBS Media Ventures (domestic rights); Paramount Global Content Distribution (international rights)
- Area served: Worldwide
- Parent: Paramount Pictures

Paramount Worldwide Television Licensing & Distribution was the television distribution arm of Paramount Pictures, a subsidiary of Paramount Skydance.

It is the successor to Paramount's original syndication arm, Paramount Domestic Television, which was renamed to CBS Paramount Domestic Television on January 17, 2006, and later was merged with King World Productions to form CBS Television Distribution (now CBS Media Ventures) on September 26, 2006. It is also the successor to Paramount's original international distribution arm, Paramount International Television, which was merged with CBS Broadcast International to form CBS Paramount International Television in August 2004, and was later renamed to CBS Studios International on May 20, 2009.

Paramount Pictures returned to television operations on March 4, 2013, forming a new syndication unit in the process. In 2020, Paramount Worldwide Television Licensing & Distribution and CBS Studios International were merged to form ViacomCBS Global Distribution Group (currently known as Paramount Global Content Distribution), while U.S. distribution rights to the unit's content were assumed by Paramount Pictures' distribution department; some films are licensed to Trifecta Entertainment & Media, and series produced by Paramount Television Studios were transferred to CBS Media Ventures in 2024.

== See also ==
- CBS Studios, the corporate sibling of Paramount Television Studios
  - Paramount Television, the original incarnation of this division
  - Paramount Domestic Television, the television distribution arm of the original Paramount Television
- CBS Media Ventures
- Desilu Productions, the predecessor to the television division of Paramount Pictures
- Viacom Productions
- Paramount Pictures
- List of Paramount Pictures executives
