= Brent Redstone =

American lawyer, heir and entrepreneur (born 1951)

- Born: c. 1951 (age 74–75)
- Education: Harvard University; Syracuse University
- Years active: 2004–present
- Spouse: Anne Marie Vanderwerken (m. 1980)
- Children: 2
- Parent: Sumner Redstone (father)
- Relatives: Michael Redstone (paternal grandfather); Shari Redstone (sister)

Brent Dale Redstone (born c. 1951) is an American lawyer, heir and businessman.

== Biography ==
Brent Dale Redstone was born in 1951, the son of Sumner Redstone, né Rothstein, and Phyllis Gloria Raphael. He is the brother of Shari Redstone, and grandson of Michael Redstone. He has two daughters, one of them Keryn Redstone. His family is Jewish.

== Career ==
Like his father, Brent graduated from Harvard University and became a lawyer. He earned a J.D. degree from Syracuse University in 1976. Like his father, Brent worked as an attorney – practicing as a criminal prosecutor in Boston for 14 years – prior to joining National Amusements, the family business. He is currently Licensed by the Colorado Bar Association.

During his brief tenure at Viacom, Brent was removed from the board of parent company National Amusements, Inc., in 2003. In 2006, he sued his father and sister, later dropping the lawsuit after an undisclosed settlement was reached, which reportedly included the buyout of Brent's one-sixth stake in National Amusements. Shari Redstone owned 20% of National Amusements and Sumner Redstone owned 80%. National Amusements holds a controlling stake in CBS Corporation, Viacom, MTV Networks, BET, Paramount Pictures, and are equal partners in MovieTickets.com.

In 2016, the Redstone family entered into legalities over whether Sumner Redstone was mentally competent. At the time, he used an iPad to communicate.
