= Tom Freston =

American television executive

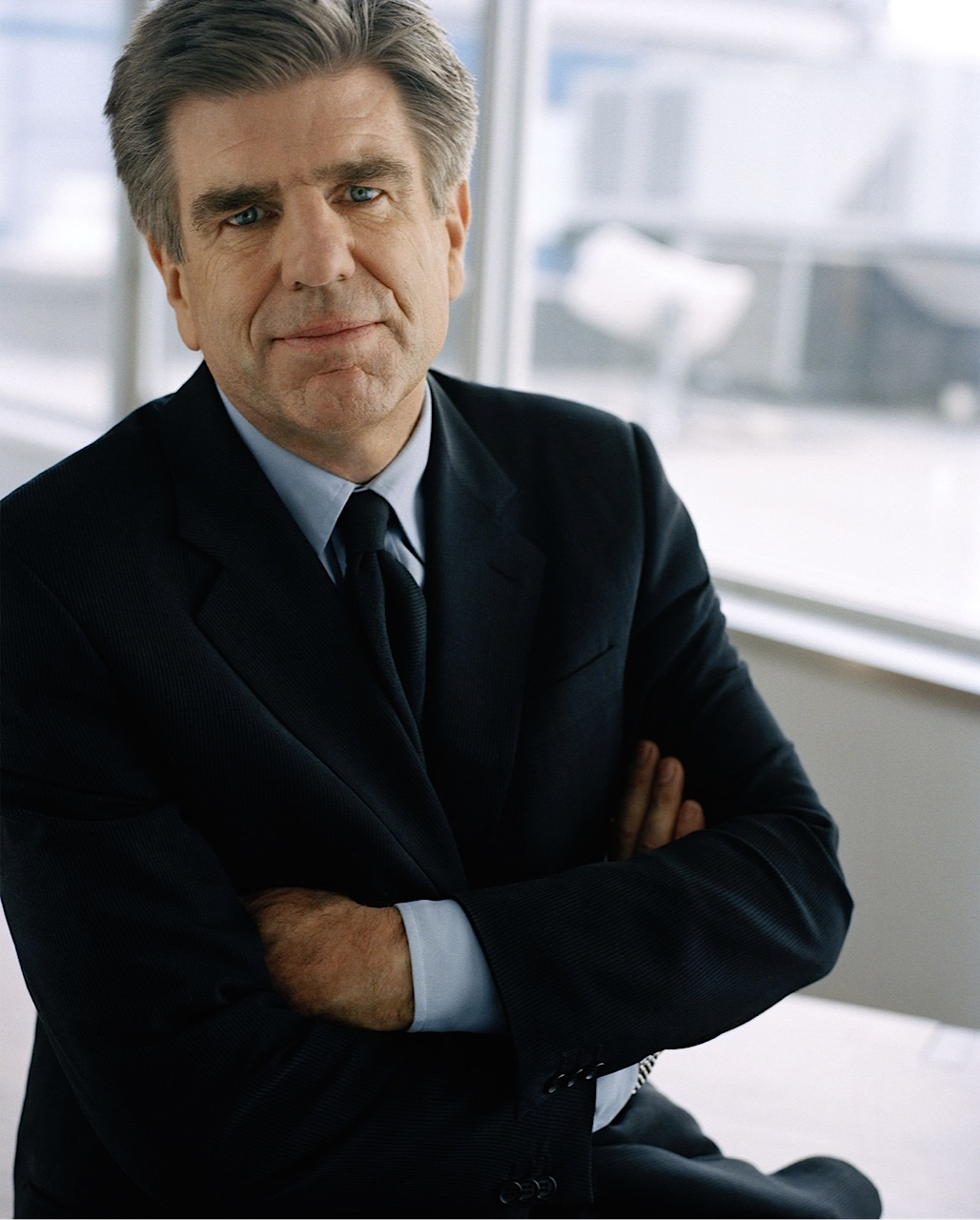
- Tom Freston at the 2011 Time 100 gala.
- Born: November 22, 1945 (age 80); New York City, U.S.
- Education: Saint Michael's College (BA); New York University (MBA)
- Occupation: Businessman
- Years active: 1979–present
- Known for: CEO of Viacom's MTV Networks (1987–2004)
- Board member of: One Campaign; Firefly3; Moby Group
- Spouses: Margaret Ellen Badali (m. 1980, divorced) Kathy Freston (m. 1998; div. 2014)
- Children: 2

Thomas E. Freston (born November 22, 1945) is an American media proprietor, businessman, and financier.

== Early life and education ==
Freston grew up in Rowayton, Connecticut. He received a Bachelor of Arts from Saint Michael's College and an MBA from New York University. Freston began his career advertising at Benton & Bowles, which later merged with D'Arcy. In 1972, after a year of traveling, he moved to South Asia to start a textile and clothing business, Hindu Kush, and worked and lived in New Delhi, India, and Kabul, Afghanistan.

== Career ==
Returning to the United States in 1979, he joined the Warner-Amex Satellite Entertainment Company (WASEC), a pioneer in the new field of cable television programming. He was one of the founding members of the team that created a music video channel MTV in 1981. As head of marketing, he worked on the "I Want My MTV" ad campaign that helped make the new network a cultural phenomenon. In 1987, he became the president and CEO of MTV Networks, a job he held for 17 years. MTV Networks launched and operated networks including: Nickelodeon, VH1, Comedy Central, TV Land, Spike, CMT, Logo TV, Noggin, and others.

As CEO of MTV Networks, Freston expanded the company's reach, built an animation studio, produced feature films, and developed large consumer product and digital businesses. Popular brands and shows included: Blue's Clues, Beavis and Butthead, The Adventures of Pete & Pete, SpongeBob SquarePants, Daria, The Daily Show, Jackass, South Park, Drawn Together, Crank Yankers, The Fairly OddParents, Aeon Flux, Chappelle's Show, I Love the..., Behind the Music, Avatar: The Last Airbender, The Colbert Report, Wonder Showzen, The Ren & Stimpy Show, The Real World, Dora the Explorer, Rugrats, and Star Trek series (from Generation to Deep Space Nine).

=== Viacom ===
In 2004, after Viacom president and COO Mel Karmazin stepped down, Freston was named co-president and co-COO of Viacom (along with Leslie Moonves). Freston oversaw MTV Networks, Paramount Pictures, Famous Music Publishing, and Simon & Schuster.

On December 31, 2005, Viacom was split into two separate companies – the second Viacom led by Freston, and CBS Corporation headed by Moonves; both CBS Corporation and the second Viacom were under National Amusements administration until 2019.

In September 2006, Viacom chairman Sumner Redstone fired Freston from the position of CEO. One of the chief reasons for the move was that Freston had not moved decisively enough to buy MySpace, which was then the most popular social networking site; instead Rupert Murdoch's News Corporation purchased the site for $580 million. Redstone believed that the failure to acquire MySpace contributed to the $33.16 to $29.71 (11%) drop in Viacom's stock price in 2006 up to the date of Freston's ouster. Freston's successor as CEO, Philippe Dauman, was quoted as saying "never, ever let another competitor beat us to the trophy". Redstone told interviewer Charlie Rose that losing MySpace had been "humiliating," adding, "MySpace was sitting there for the taking for $500 million." Murdoch's company ended up selling Myspace, which had largely declined along with the rise of rival social networking website Facebook, in 2012; News Corp's sale price at the time was $35 million.

=== Post-Viacom ===
After leaving Viacom in 2006, Tom Freston shifted from running a global media company to a career focused on investing, advising, philanthropy, and international media projects. He also wrote a series of articles for Vanity Fair, Condé Nast Traveler, Air Mail, and other publications. He founded Firefly3, a media-focused investment and consulting firm. Through it, he invested in and advised media and entertainment companies, including OWN: The Oprah Winfrey Network and Vice Media. In 2007 he returned to Afghanistan to advise the television startup, Tolo TV, which became the country’s leading broadcaster. He joined board of the parent company Moby Media. His work with Moby also took him to media ventures in Yemen, India, and Ethiopia. Also in 2007, he joined the board of The ONE Campaign, Bono's antipoverty advocacy organization focused on Africa, and later became its Board Chair. Beginning in 2010, he consulted with Oprah Winfrey on the launch of OWN: The Oprah Winfrey Network. In 2011, he became a board member and advisor to Vice Media. In 2015, he became a Senior Advisor to The Raine Group, a merchant bank focused on media, technology, and telecommunications. Over the years, he has served on the boards of organizations including Moby Media, Vice Media, DreamWorks Animation, The ONE Campaign, Imagine Entertainment, and New America. He is a Director Emeritus of both the American Museum of Natural History and New America.

== Awards and Recognition ==
Freston was included in TIME Magazine’s first “100 Most Influential People in the World” list in 2006. He was inducted into the Cable Television Hall of Fame in 2005 and the Television Academy Hall of Fame in 2011. He received the Paley Center for Media “Innovation & Excellence Award” in 2012. In 2024 he received the initial Michael Bloomberg PAC NYC “Icon of Culture Award.” He received the Simon Wiesenthal Center’s Humanitarian Award in 2006. He was MIPCOM’s “Personality of the Year” in Cannes, France in 2001.

He has received Honorary Doctorates from the American University of Afghanistan (2021) and Emerson College (2007), and was the St. Michael’s College commencement speaker in 2012.

He has been honored as “Person the Year” for many charitable fundraisers including: The Center for Communication (2006), the AMC Cancer Research Center (1990), the T.J. Martel Foundation (1994), UNICEF (2014), and others.

== Memoir ==
In 2025, he published his memoir, Unplugged: Adventures from MTV to Timbuktu, which received strong critical reviews. The book reflects on his unconventional path—from bartending after business school and years of travel through Asia and the Hindu Kush, to his 26-year media career and his post-Viacom adventures.

== Personal life ==
In 1980, Freston married Margaret Ellen Badali. They had two children and divorced in 1994.

In 1998, Freston married Kathy Freston, a former model, self-help author, and health and wellness expert. They divorced in 2014.

== Bibliography ==
- Freston, Tom (December 2012). "Aung San Suu Kyi". V.F. Portrait. Vanity Fair. 628: 158–159.
- Freston, Tom (February 2014). "The Promised Land". Vanity Fair.
- Freston, Tom (September 2014). "Visiting Errol Flynn's Estate in the "Other" Jamaica". Vanity Fair.
- Freston, Tom (April 2015). "Time Traveling in Marrakech". Vanity Fair.
- Freston, Tom (December 2015). "Why MTV Co-Founder Tom Freston Is Hooked on India". Condé Nast Traveller.
- Freston, Tom (December 2015). "In the War of Music vs. Terror, Bet on Music". Vanity Fair.
- Freston, Tom (July 2017). "Showtime in the Sahara". Vanity Fair.
- Freston, Tom (August 2019). "RED Scare". Airmail.
