= Ralph Baruch =

German-American executive

- Born: Rudolph Maximilian Baruch; August 5, 1923; Frankfurt, Germany
- Died: March 3, 2016 (aged 92); New York City, U.S.
- Occupations: president and chief executive, Viacom vice president, CBS general manager, CBS Enterprises
- Spouses: Elizabeth "Lilo" Bachrach (died 1959); Jean Ursell de Mountford

Rudolph Maximilian "Ralph" Baruch (August 5, 1923 – March 3, 2016) was a German-American CBS executive and the first president and chief executive of Viacom.

== Early life ==
Baruch was born to a Jewish family in Frankfurt, Germany, in 1923, but his family fled in the mid-1930s to Paris. His father returned to Germany, however, in 1938 to recruit spies for French counterintelligence services, and his name ended up on the Nazi most-wanted list. The Emergency Rescue Committee helped the family immigrate to New York City in 1940.

== Business career ==
Baruch was hired in 1943 as an engineer at Empire Broadcasting, and later as an ad salesman at New York's DuMont Network affiliate and with the Los Angeles Times's Consolidated Television Film Sales in the eastern United States.

In 1954, Baruch became an account executive for CBS Television Film Sales. He later became vice president of CBS and general manager of CBS Enterprises, the company's cable and television syndication division.

=== Viacom ===
Viacom was spun off from CBS in 1971 amid new FCC rules forbidding television networks from owning syndication companies.

Under the Viacom brand, Baruch started cable networks including Showtime and Lifetime (originally known as The Cable Health Network). He took the title of chairman of Viacom in 1983, and later acquired Warner-Amex Satellite Entertainment, which brought networks including MTV, Nickelodeon, The Movie Channel and VH1 into the portfolio. He also was a co-founder of C-SPAN.

Baruch played a leading role in getting Congress to pass the Cable Communications Policy Act of 1984, which deregulated the cable industry.

In 1987, Sumner Redstone purchased Viacom and replaced Baruch as chairman, keeping him on only as a consultant.

In 2006, Baruch was inducted into the Cable Hall of Fame.

== Personal life ==
Soon after coming to the United States, Baruch married 17-year-old Elizabeth "Lilo" Bachrach, who was also a refugee from Frankfurt. Bachrach died in 1959. Baruch later remarried to Jean Ursell de Mountford.

Baruch was a former director and member of the executive committee of the National Cable Television Association; a founder of the International Academy of Television Arts & Sciences; and a trustee of the Museum of Television and Radio and Lenox Hill Hospital. He was a co-founder, past chairman and chairman emeritus of the National Academy of Cable Programming, as well as past president of the International Radio and Television Society. He also served as vice chairman of Carnegie Hall from 1997 to 1999, and as a member of its executive committee.

In addition to his Manhattan home, Baruch had a home in Bedford Hills, New York.

In 2007, Baruch wrote a memoir entitled Television Tightrope: How I Escaped Hitler, Survived CBS and Fathered Viacom.
