= Harry Sagansky =

American mobster (1898–1997)

Harry J. Sagansky
- Born: January 6, 1898; Boston, Massachusetts, US
- Died: January 28, 1997 (aged 99); Beth Israel Deaconess Medical Center, Israel
- Education: Tufts University
- Occupation: Mobster

Harry J. "Doc" Sagansky (January 6, 1898 – January 28, 1997) was an American crime boss of Jewish descent. Active in Boston, Sagansky controlled one of city's largest bookmaking operations during the 1950s. He is also the oldest American Mafia associate to serve a federal prison sentence at the age of 91.

== Biography ==
Growing up in Boston, Massachusetts, to first generation Jewish-American immigrants from Lithuania, Sagansky sold newspapers while working his way through school and eventually graduating in dentistry from Tufts University in 1918. Opening a practice at a pharmacy which doubled as a covert liquor store at Scollay Square, he would become involved in illegal gambling during Prohibition.

By 1931, he began investing in several businesses, including part ownership of two Boston nightclubs. He also operated a loan agency, which authorities suspected was worth an estimated $90 million. In 1943, he was arrested during a police raid on one of his gambling dens. He was later charged with his role in the gambling syndicate and served a prison sentence for attempting to bribe a city official for political protection for a "Beano game". He was a business partner of Michael Redstone, the father of Sumner Redstone, who was the CEO of Viacom until his death in 2020.

During the 1950s, his involvement in illegal gambling operations was investigated by the Kefauver hearings, where authorities would claim it was "the largest racket kingdom in existence in the city of Boston".

Throughout his life, Sagansky was a philanthropist, donating money to Beth Israel Hospital and to Tufts Dental School. He was an early, and major, contributor to Ben-Gurion University of the Negev in Beersheba, Israel.

He died of natural causes in 1997 at Beth Israel Hospital, 22 days after his 99th birthday. He was survived by three sons, a daughter, eight grandchildren and 17 great-grandchildren.
