= Split of CBS Corporation and Viacom =

2005 split of CBS Corporation and Viacom

- Logo before the split

- Logos after the split
- Target: Viacom (first incarnation)
- Type: Corporate split
- Initiated: March 2005; 21 years ago
- Completed: December 31, 2005; 20 years ago
- Resulting entity: Viacom (second incarnation); CBS Corporation (second incarnation)

On December 31, 2005, American mass media company Viacom split into two companies: the second CBS Corporation, its successor (the first being a short lived rename of Westinghouse Electric) which held the namesake flagship channel CBS, CBS News, CBS Sports, Showtime Networks, UPN (which later merged with The WB to form the CW, co-owned by Time Warner), Smithsonian Channel, Simon and Schuster, Infinity Broadcasting Corporation, Viacom Outdoor, and Paramount Television, and an entirely new Viacom which held Paramount Pictures, Nickelodeon, Nick Jr., Noggin, Nicktoons, TEENick, Music Television, Black Entertainment Television, Video Hits One, Country Music Television, and later DreamWorks, respectively. It was first announced in March 2005. The companies were controlled under National Amusements' control because of a stagnating stock price.

They would later re-merge into ViacomCBS, later Paramount Global, which would merge with Skydance Media to become Paramount Skydance.

== Background ==
In 1952, CBS formed CBS Television Film Sales, a division which handled syndication rights for CBS's library of network-owned television series. This division was renamed CBS Films in 1958, again renamed CBS Enterprises in January 1968, and finally renamed Viacom (an acronym of Video and Audio Communications) in 1970. In 1971, this syndication division was spun off amid new FCC rules forbidding television networks from owning syndication companies (these rules were eventually abolished completely in 1993). In 1985, Viacom purchased MTV Networks and Showtime/The Movie Channel Inc. from Warner Communications and American Express. In 1987, Viacom was acquired by theater operator company National Amusements. In 1999, Viacom made its biggest acquisition to date by announcing plans to merge with its former parent CBS Corporation (the renamed Westinghouse Electric Corporation, which had merged with CBS in 1995). The merger was completed in 2000, resulting in CBS reuniting with its former syndication division.

== Split ==
After the departure of Mel Karmazin in 2004, Sumner Redstone, who served as chairman and chief executive officer, decided to split the offices of president and chief operating officer between Moonves and Freston. Redstone was set to retire in the near future, and a split was seen as a creative solution to the matter of replacing him. It was also intended to provide alternative investments that would be more appealing to investors: one a high cash flow, lower growth company that could afford to pay a substantial dividend and the other a growing company that would have greater investment opportunities and therefore would not be expected to pay a dividend.

In March 2005, Viacom contemplated splitting the company into two publicly traded companies, amid issues of the stock price stagnating and clashing corporate cultures between the cable and broadcast divisions, which came to a head with the Super Bowl XXXVIII halftime show controversy a year previous with the MTV-produced show causing controversy for game broadcaster CBS.

On June 14, 2005, the Viacom board of directors approved the split of the company into two firms. The CBS Corporation name would be revived for one of the companies, to be headed by longtime television executive (and Viacom co-president) Les Moonves, and would include the namesake television network CBS, UPN, Infinity Broadcasting Corporation, Viacom Outdoor, Showtime Networks, and Paramount Television.

The split was structured such that the second Viacom was spun off from the first Viacom, which was renamed CBS Corporation. In a sense, this was a repeat of the 1971 spin-off. However, in this case, CBS retained virtually all of the prior firm's broadcast television assets, including its various syndication companies.

CBS said: "In many ways, today's decision is a natural extension of the path we laid out in creating Viacom," Redstone said in a company-wide memo. "We are retaining the significant advantages we captured in the Paramount and CBS mergers and, at the same time, recognizing the need to adapt to a changing competitive environment."

With the split, the two companies began trading on the New York Stock Exchange (NYSE) on January 3, 2006. Investors anticipated Viacom benefiting from the split, but instead, it dropped approximately 20 percent, while CBS Corporation rose 9 percent, that same year, Paramount Parks became a wholly owned theme park unit of CBS Corporation.

The second Viacom was created by Redstone and headed by Freston. It consisted of BET Networks, MTV Networks, and Paramount Pictures. It started trading on January 3, 2006.

Despite the split, both companies are controlled by National Amusements.

== Re-merge ==
ViacomCBS logo.

On August 13, 2019, CBS and Viacom officially announced their merger; the combined company was to be named ViacomCBS, with Shari Redstone serving as chair.

Upon the merger agreement, Viacom and CBS jointly announced that the transaction is expected to close by the end of 2019, pending regulatory and shareholder approvals. The merger required approval by the Federal Trade Commission (FTC).

On October 28, 2019, the merger was approved by National Amusements, which then announced the deal would close in early December; the recombined company trades its shares on Nasdaq under the symbols "VIAC" and "VIACA" after CBS Corporation delisted its shares on the New York Stock Exchange (NYSE).

== Assets moved to CBS Corporation ==
- CBS
  - CBS Sports
  - CBS News
  - CBSN
  - CBS Sports Network
  - CBS Paramount Television
  - Infinity Broadcasting
  - UPN (merged with the WB in 2006)
- Showtime Networks
  - Showtime
  - The Movie Channel
- Smithsonian Channel
- Simon and Schuster

== Assets moved to Viacom ==
- MTV Networks
  - MTV
    - MTV2
    - MTV Tres
    - VH1
  - Nickelodeon
    - Nick Jr.
    - NickToons Network
    - Nickelodeon Games and Sports
    - TEENick
    - Noggin
    - Nick@Nite
      - TV Land
  - Spike TV
  - Comedy Central
- BET Networks
  - BET
- Paramount Pictures Corporation
  - DreamWorks Pictures
