= Dauman =

Dauman is a surname. Notable people with the surname include:

- Anatole Dauman (1925–1998), French film producer
- Philippe Dauman (born 1953), American chief executive
