= Roger King (producer) =

American television executive

- Born: Roger Monroe King; August 22, 1944; New Jersey, US
- Died: December 8, 2007 (aged 63); Boca Raton, Florida, US
- Known for: King World Productions

Roger Monroe King (August 22, 1944 – December 8, 2007) was an American television and media executive for King World Productions and CBS.

He was a son of Charles King (1912-1972), who acquired and marketed the Hal Roach produced comedy series of shorts films Our Gang (later renamed The Little Rascals) from the 1930s and established a company in 1964 to market and syndicate them, then known as King World Productions or Entertainment, which was acquired in 2000 by CBS Productions (a subsidiary of the CBS Corporation, formerly the Columbia Broadcasting System).

He was inducted into the Broadcasting & Cable Hall of Fame in 1992 and the National Association of Broadcasters Hall of Fame in 2004 and is credited with launching the careers of such television stars as Oprah Winfrey, Phil McGraw and Alex Trebek.

== King World Productions ==
Born in New Jersey, King became chairman of the board of King World Productions in 1977, following the death of his father, Charles King, who had founded the company in 1964.

In what his old friends refer to as 'The Early Years' (1974–1977), King, as CEO with J&R Advertising, and his brothers, Michael and Bob, commandeered WKID TV; where they broadcast a Late Night TV Talk Show from Pirate's World in Hollywood, Florida.

The Show interviewed celebrities that were passing through South Florida such as actor Robert Conrad after he was involved a controversial fist fight in a local night club. Several of the programs were directed by Dale Richman. The interviews were followed by King World's Little Rascals.

The local commercials that were played were produced by King and narrated by musician/photographer Jessie Eastland, (a.k.a. Robert Demeo) a friend of the King Brothers during those years.

Under King's leadership, King World became the leading distributor of popular syndicated television programming. He put on the national scene daytime television's most popular programs of the 1980s, 1990s and 2000s, including Harpo Productions The Oprah Winfrey Show and Dr. Phil and is also credited with launching the syndicated news magazine, Inside Edition.

He also syndicated Merv Griffin's Wheel of Fortune (for Sony Pictures Television), starring Pat Sajak and Vanna White which, according to CBS, has been the top-rated syndicated TV show for the past 26 years. Another of his Griffin syndications, Jeopardy! (also by Sony Pictures Television), has remained among the top three for 25 years.

== Top executive at CBS ==
King joined CBS in 2000 following the merger of King World Productions with the broadcasting network, and was chief executive officer of CBS Television Distribution from September 26, 2006 until his death. He was responsible for the syndicated sale of repeat episodes from CBS' top prime-time shows, including the CSI series, Survivor, The Amazing Race, Everybody Loves Raymond (ancillary rights to this series are owned by Warner Bros. Discovery via HBO) and UPN's America's Next Top Model.

== Personal life ==
King had a reputation for throwing lavish industry parties. In January 1998, during the NATPE convention in New Orleans, King rented out the Louisiana Superdome for the evening and hired Elton John to entertain his guests. Remembering his early struggles in his own career, King was known for reaching out his hand to newcomers in the industry and often availing himself as a mentor and advisor.

King was a summer resident of Bay Head, New Jersey.

== Death ==
King suffered a stroke at his home in Boca Raton, Florida and died the following day at Boca Raton Community Hospital at the age of 63.

Oprah Winfrey stated, "I will never forget what he did for me. And this industry will never forget his legendary presence. He was truly a great guy".
