= Dealflicks =

Online movie ticketing company

- Industry: Entertainment (movie theaters)
- Founded: 2012
- Fate: Ended Service on Aug 14, 2018
- Headquarters: Los Angeles, California, U.S.
- Products: Online movie tickets
- Website: www.dealflicks.com

Dealflicks was an online movie ticketing company founded in 2012 and based in Los Angeles, CA. The company sold discounted movie tickets online and through mobile devices. The company was partnered with more than 750 theaters in the United States. As of July 2014, Dealflicks had raised $1.7 million in seed funding.

== History ==
The concept for the company began when CEO and co-founder, Sean Wycliffe watched the film The King's Speech in 2010. According to Wycliffe, the theater was mostly empty when he arrived. He then had the idea to launch a company that was similar to a "Priceline for movie tickets".

In April 2012, the company launched their beta platform with two independent theaters in California. In July 2012, the website was officially launched.

Dealflicks was launched by company co-founders Sean Wycliffe, Kevin Hong, and Zachary Cancio. In the initial stages, they struggled to sign theaters; in the first 10 months, they were only able to sign up 100 new theaters. Hong and the sales team decided to travel around the country in a mini-van to sign up theaters. These sales calls were known as "Man Van" trips and helped the team sign up 45 additional theaters in just 3 months.

In March 2016, the company signed on Carmike Cinemas, the fourth largest theater chain in the United States. This agreement allows Dealflicks to be available in more than 750 theaters nationwide. However, in March 2016 AMC announced their intent to purchase Carmike and the acquisition was completed in December that same year. Almost immediately AMC cancelled the agreement with Dealflicks, effectively removing the Carmike theatres from Dealflicks' offering.

As of August 2016, the company partnered with 13 of the top 50 theater chains in the U.S., including B&B Theatres, and Bow Tie Cinemas, among others.

On August 14, 2018, the company announced its fate to its customers through e-mail, ending service the same day.

== See also ==
- Fandango.com
- MovieTickets.com
- MoviePass
