= Shari Redstone =

American media executive (born 1954)

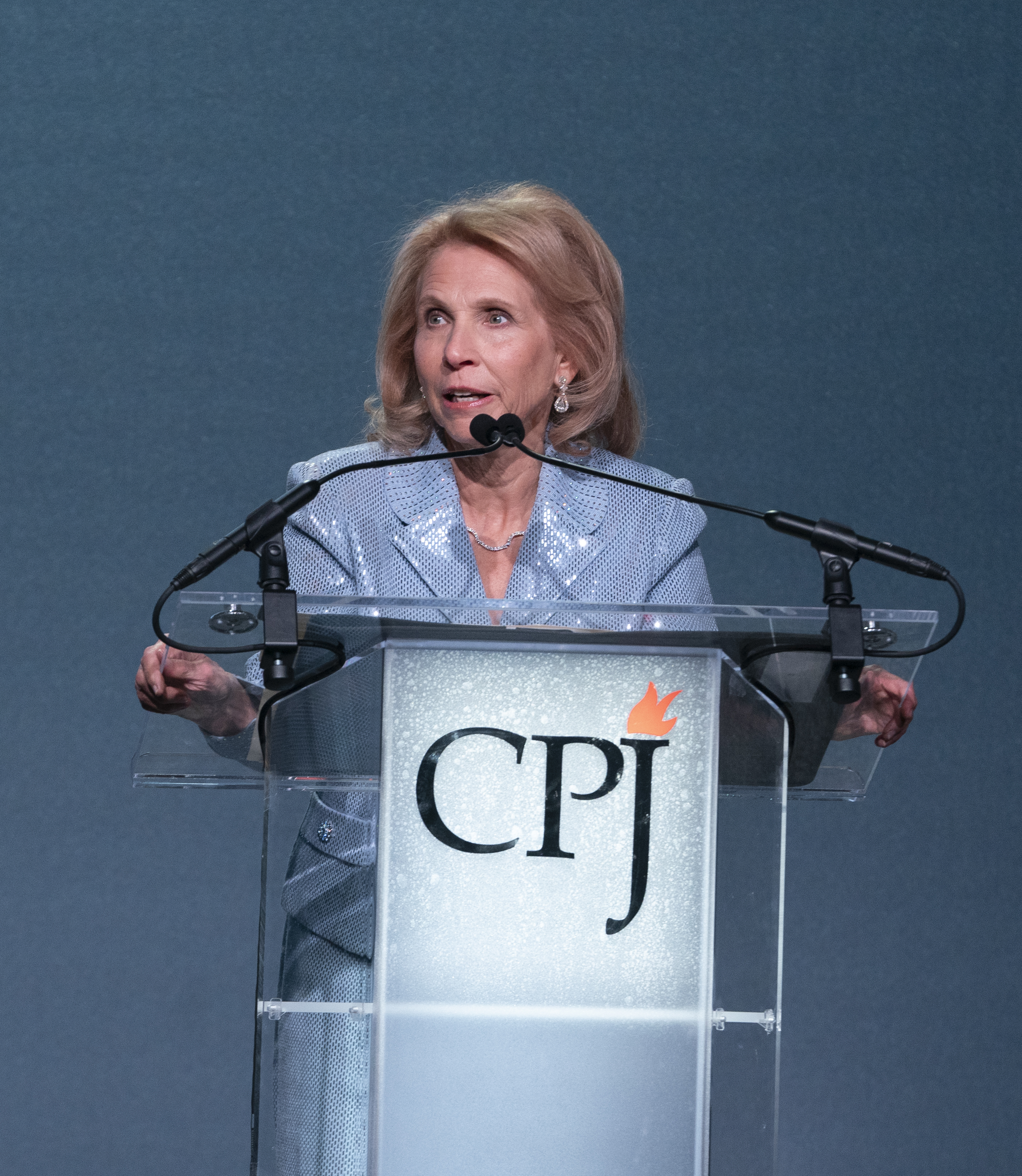
- Redstone in 2022
- Born: Shari Ellin Redstone; April 14, 1954 (age 72); Washington, D.C., U.S.
- Education: Tufts University (BS); Boston University (JD, LLM)
- Spouse: Ira A. Korff (m. 1980; div. 1992)
- Children: 3, including Brandon Korff
- Parent: Sumner Redstone (father)
- Relatives: Michael Redstone (grandfather); Brent Redstone (brother)

Shari Ellin Redstone (born April 14, 1954) is an American heiress, businesswoman, and media executive. She was the non-executive chairwoman of Paramount Global, chairwoman, president and CEO of National Amusements, and a former vice chair of Paramount Global's predecessors, CBS Corporation and Viacom. Through National Amusements, Redstone and her family held majority voting power over Paramount Global and its subsidiaries – CBS, Comedy Central, BET, Showtime Networks, Nickelodeon, MTV and the film studio Paramount Pictures.

In 2020, Redstone was named on Time's list of the 100 most influential people in the world. In 2023, she ranked 37th in Forbes list of "World's 100 most powerful women".

== Early life ==
Redstone was born into a Jewish family and is the daughter of Phyllis Gloria Raphael and Sumner Redstone, and the sister of Brent Redstone. Her grandfather was Michael Redstone, who was the original founder of National Amusements, the parent company that now owns the majority of the Redstone media empire. She graduated with a bachelor's degree from Tufts University in 1975. She later received her J.D. degree in 1978 and her LL.M. degree in 1980 from Boston University School of Law.

Redstone practiced corporate law, estate planning and criminal law in the Boston area before joining National Amusements.

== Career ==
=== 1990s–2016 ===
In 1999, Redstone became president of National Amusements, one of the top ten movie exhibitors in the United States. During her tenure, she expanded the company's international footprint and its exploration of new technologies.

In 2007, Redstone and her father feuded publicly over issues of corporate governance and the future of the cinema chain. Documents have been made public which verify that, as part of a settlement from Sumner's first divorce, all of Sumner's stock is in irrevocable trusts that will be left to his grandchildren.

In 2010, Redstone and her partners purchased the theaters that they had built, and formed Rising Star Media, of which she was chairman, and turned it into the country's top-grossing cinema chain. Redstone and her partners then sold Rising Star Media to Russian theater operator Cinema Park in 2011.

In 2011, Redstone became co-founder and managing partner of Advancit Capital LLC, an investment platform focusing on early stage in media, entertainment and technology. She was a co-chairman of MovieTickets.com before its sale to Fandango Media in 2017, and is a member of the board of directors and executive committee for the National Association of Theatre Owners (NATO).

=== 2016–2025 ===
In February 2016, her father resigned as CBS executive chairman after questions arose about his mental competency. CBS's board then offered Shari Redstone the position of non-executive chair, but she declined. The CBS board announced that Les Moonves replaced Sumner Redstone as chairman. In 2016, Redstone, who at the time was vice chairperson of CBS and Viacom and president of National Amusements (the controlling shareholder of CBS and Viacom), gave the following statement on succession: "my father's Trust states his intention that I succeed him as (non-executive) Chairman at CBS and Viacom, and also names me as a Trustee after his death." She stated that she wanted the chairs of each company to be "not a Trustee of my father's trust or otherwise intertwined in Redstone family matters," and she nominated Les as the CBS chair.

In February 2016, against Shari Redstone's desires, Viacom's board of directors named Philippe Dauman, already the CEO and president, the chairman, replacing Sumner Redstone.

In January 2018, The Wall Street Journal reported that Shari Redstone was pushing for CBS to merge with Viacom, with Redstone also gathering names for new board members at CBS.

In August 2019, the Associated Press reported that Shari Redstone had become the chair of the board for the reuniting of CBS and Viacom as ViacomCBS, later known as Paramount Global.

In May 2020, she was named as a defendant in a lawsuit filed by the Bucks County Retirement Fund and the International Union of Operating Engineers, over the perceived "destruction of value" caused by the CBS and Viacom merger. In January 2021, a Delaware judge said former CBS shareholders could sue Shari Redstone for pressuring the company to enter the merger, and in 2022, Redstone and Viacom sued a group of insurers for refusing to cover legal bills incurred by the court battle.

In July 2024, it was announced that Redstone would sell her family’s controlling interest in Paramount Global to independent film studio Skydance Media, founded by film producer David Ellison, in a merger agreement that would create a corporation valued approximately $28 billion.

In August 2025, Paramount Global and Skydance Media closed the transaction, forming Paramount Skydance Corporation and ending the Redstone family’s 38 years of control of Viacom and related companies.

=== From 2025 ===
In September 2025, Redstone became Chair of the Board of the Israeli-based Studio Sipur, famous for its Emmy-winning 2024 documentary We Will Dance Again about the October 7th attacks of 2023.

== Personal life ==
Redstone married and later divorced Rabbi Ira A. Korff, and they have three children, Tyler, Kimberlee and Brandon. Her ex-husband was president and director of National Amusements until 1994, two years after the divorce.

She is an observant Jew.

In June 2025, it was reported that Redstone had been diagnosed with thyroid cancer earlier in the spring and had surgery the previous month.

=== Political views ===
She has expressed support for Israel, saying: "They're one of the few nations that really represent a democratic society." In October 2024, she defended CBS Mornings anchor Tony Dokoupil over his confrontational interview with pro-Palestinian author Ta-Nehisi Coates about his book The Message, saying “I’m very glad that we gave [Coates] an opportunity to speak, but we have to also provide the opportunity to challenge him on what he says.”

=== Philanthropy ===
As of January 2018, Redstone is a member of the board of directors at Combined Jewish Philanthropies and the board of trustees at Dana Farber Cancer Institute. She is also on the board of directors of the National Center on Addiction and Substance Abuse (CASA) at Columbia University and the John F. Kennedy Library Foundation. Redstone joined the board and executive committee of "Our Time", a mass-membership organization that stands for the economic interests and political inclusion of young Americans aged 18–30. She sat on the local advisory board and executive committee for BUILD, a nonprofit organization that uses entrepreneurship to propel low income youth through high school and into college.
