= Viacom (1948–2005) =

American media conglomerate (1948–2005)

Viacom Inc.
- Final logo, used from 1990 to 2005

- Headquarters at One Astor Plaza in New York City
- Formerly: CBS Television Syndicated Sales (1948–1952); CBS Television Film Sales (1952–1958); CBS Films (1958–1967); CBS Enterprises Inc. (1967–1970)
- Type: Public
- Traded as: NYSE: VIA (Class A); NYSE: VIA.B (Class B)
- Industry: Broadcasting and publishing
- Founded: November 11, 1948; 78 years ago
- Founder: H. Grant Theis
- Defunct: December 31, 2005; 20 years ago
- Fate: Split into the second incarnations of CBS Corporation and Viacom
- Successors: CBS Corporation; Viacom
- Headquarters: One Astor Plaza, New York City, United States
- Area served: Worldwide
- Key people: Sumner Redstone (chairman and CEO); Tom Freston (co-president and co-COO); Les Moonves (co-president and co-COO)
- Owner: National Amusements (1987–2005)
- Divisions: Cable Networks; Television; Radio; Outdoor; Entertainment
- Subsidiaries: CBS Television; UPN; Paramount Pictures; Paramount Television; MTV Networks; Showtime Networks; BET Networks; MTV Networks International; Paramount Parks; Famous Players; Simon & Schuster; King World Productions; Westinghouse Licensing Corporation
- Website: https://www.viacom.com/ (archived on December 31, 2005)

The first incarnation of Viacom Inc. (Note: The pronunciation /ˈviːəkɒm/ VEE-ə-kom was used by inaugural chairman Ralph Baruch. The pronunciation /ˈvaɪ.əkɒm/ VY-ə-kom was favored by Sumner Redstone and included in its audible identification marks following its purchase by National Amusements in 1987.) (derived from "Video & Audio Communications") was an American mass media and entertainment conglomerate based in New York City. It began as CBS Television Syndicated Sales; the broadcast syndication division of the CBS television network on November 11, 1948; it was renamed to CBS Television Film Sales, on March 16, 1952; it was renamed CBS Films in 1958, renamed CBS Enterprises in 1968, renamed Viacom in 1970, and spun off into its own company in 1971. Viacom was a distributor of CBS television series throughout the 1970s and 1980s, and also distributed syndicated television programs. The company came under Sumner Redstone's control in 1987 through his cinema chain company, National Amusements.

At the time of its split, Viacom's assets included the CBS and UPN broadcast networks, the Paramount Pictures film and television studio, local radio station operator CBS Radio, cable channels such as MTV, Nickelodeon, Comedy Central, BET, and Showtime, outdoor media operator Viacom Outdoor, television production and distribution firm King World Productions, and book publisher Simon & Schuster. It also owned its IP holding subsidiary Viacom International and brand licensor Westinghouse Licensing Corporation.

In 2000, Viacom acquired the parent company of CBS, the former Westinghouse Electric Corporation, which had been renamed CBS Corporation in 1997. Viacom was split into the second incarnations of CBS Corporation and Viacom on December 31, 2005, which both being controlled by National Amusements; the split was structured with the second CBS Corporation being the original Viacom's legal successor, and the second Viacom being an entirely new company. The two companies eventually re-merged in 2019, leading to the formation of ViacomCBS, which was last known as Paramount Global. In August 2025, Paramount and National Amusements merged with Skydance Media to form Paramount Skydance Corporation, which has since acquired Warner Bros. Discovery and shortening its name into Skydance Corporation.

== History ==
=== CBS origins ===
Viacom originated on November 11, 1948 — when CBS hired H. Grant Theis, formerly of WTOP radio, to launch a film syndication division of CBS for broadcast syndication, designed to rival NBC's efforts in broadcast syndication, and the second network to launch its broadcast syndication unit. In 1950, Verne B. Wehnke joined CBS as sales representative of the syndicated unit. CBS decided to start syndicating these programs through the coming years via the upcoming rise of television.

In late 1951, CBS decided to spin the film syndication business out of its subsidiary CBS Television Spot Sales, and formerly CBS Radio Sales, and in 1952, decided to incorporate it as part of its own subsidiary CBS Television Film Sales, led by Fred J. Mahlstedt. In 1954, Ralph Baruch was hired by the company to be an account executive, later went through subsequent promotions.

In 1955, the company through the CBS Television Film Sales subsidiary, bought out the Terrytoons cartoon studio. Fox continued to release its theatrical cartoons through a grandfathered agreement. It renamed as CBS Films in October 1958. The company expanded in December 1958 to go beyond syndication and launch a new production unit. On December 1, 1967, it again renamed as CBS Enterprises Inc..

=== Viacom ===
On July 6, 1970, it announced that CBS Enterprises would be spun out from its parent company, and the same month the division was incorporated as Viacom, and spun off on January 1, 1971, amid new FCC rules forbidding television networks from owning syndication companies (the rules were later repealed).

Viacom expanded its activities throughout the decade with a re-establishment of a production unit, and later acquired the rights to various features from various studios.

The original Viacom logo used from 1971 to 1976

In addition to CBS television series syndication rights, Viacom also held cable systems with 90,000 cable subscribers, at that time the largest in the United States. In 1976, Viacom launched Showtime, a pay movie channel, with Warner-Amex taking a half-share ownership. The company went into original programming production starting in the late 1970s until the early 1980s with middling results. The company expanded in 1977 to launch a unit for program acquisitions and prime-time network programming.

=== Expansion through acquisitions ===
Viacom's first broadcast station acquisition came in 1978, when the company purchased WHNB-TV in New Britain, Connecticut, changing its call letters to WVIT. Two years later, Viacom added the Sonderling Broadcasting chain, giving it radio stations in New York City, Washington, D.C., Houston, and San Francisco, and one television station, WAST (now WNYT) in Albany, New York.

In 1980, the prime-time and network television production business of Viacom was reorganized into a new name, Viacom Productions, to distinguish from the syndicated unit that used the Viacom Enterprises name, led by Richard S. Reisberg.

Logo from 1976 to 1990

In 1983, Viacom purchased KSLA in Shreveport, Louisiana, and WHEC-TV in Rochester, New York, in separate transactions. This was followed in 1986 with CBS-owned KMOX-TV in St. Louis; with the purchase, that station's call letters were changed to KMOV.

Also in 1983, Viacom reacquired its premium channel Showtime, and later merged it with Warner-Amex's The Movie Channel forming Showtime/The Movie Channel, Inc. Between the late 1980s and the early 1990s, Viacom syndicated several shows produced by Carsey-Werner Productions, namely The Cosby Show, A Different World and Roseanne.

In 1985, Viacom acquired Showtime/The Movie Channel, Inc. from Warner-Amex, ending the joint venture. Around the same time, Viacom bought MTV Networks, which owned MTV, VH-1, and Nickelodeon. The deal was completed in 1986. This led to Viacom becoming a mass media company rather than simply a distribution company.

In 1987, Viacom sought to expand its horizons by launching the new Viacom Network Enterprises division, which was led by Ronald C. Bernard, in order to develop and exploit properties outside of the core cable business and the company would ride herd on diverse enterprises as Viacom's pay-per-view venture, Viewer's Choice, Satellite Direct, Inc. and SMA TV, and handle strategic planning and new business development for Viacom Networks Group, and would develop merchandising, licensing and home video business around the two Viacom subsidiaries it was currently operating, Showtime-The Movie Channel, Inc. and MTV Networks.

In 1989, the company had set up its own division, Viacom Pictures, to produce its feature films for television, most notably Showtime.

Sumner Redstone, via his theater chain operator, National Amusements, acquired a controlling interest in Viacom on June 10, 1987. In 1992, the company expanded to the software industry by launching Viacom New Media, it soon merged into Virgin Interactive about four years later. In 1993, the company had acquired ICOM Simulations, a video game developer. Redstone made a string of large acquisitions in the early 1990s, announcing plans to merge with Paramount Communications (formerly Gulf+Western), parent of Paramount Pictures, in 1993, and buying the Blockbuster Video chain in 1994. The acquisition of Paramount Communications on July 7, 1994, made Viacom one of the world's largest entertainment companies, and also made the corporation owner of the New York Knicks. Also in 1993, WTXX entered into a part-time local marketing agreement with Viacom's NBC station WVIT.

The Paramount and Blockbuster acquisitions gave Viacom access to large television holdings: An archive of programming controlled by Aaron Spelling's company which included, along with his own productions, the pre-1973 ABC and NBC libraries under Worldvision Enterprises and Republic Pictures; and an expanded group of television stations which merged Viacom's five existing outlets into Paramount's seven-station group. Viacom used some of these stations to launch the UPN network, which started operations in January 1995 as a joint venture with Chris-Craft Industries. Shortly afterward, Viacom/Paramount spent the next two years selling off its non-UPN affiliated stations to various owners. In 1997, Viacom exited the broadcast radio business, albeit temporarily, when it sold the majority of its stations to Chancellor Media, a predecessor company of iHeartMedia.

On September 7, 1999, Viacom announced their acquisition of CBS Corporation in a $35.9 billion deal. In addition to being the largest media merger in history at the time, the purchase effectively reunited Viacom with its former parent, CBS. The merger was completed in May 2000, bringing CBS's cable channels TNN (now Paramount Network) and Country Music Television (CMT) under Viacom's MTV Networks wing, as well as CBS's production and distribution units Eyemark Entertainment (formerly Group W Productions) and King World under the main wing. The merger also folded Viacom's broadcast group, now consisting entirely of UPN stations, into CBS's owned-stations division.

In 2001, Viacom completed its purchase of BET Holdings, the owners of the Black Entertainment Television (BET) network. As with CBS Cable, it was immediately integrated into MTV Networks, causing some outcry among BET workers in the Washington, D.C., area (where BET was based before the merger). As a result, BET was separated from MTV Networks, into a division known as BET Networks.

Although a majority economic interest in Viacom was held by independent shareholders, the Redstone family maintained 71% voting control of the company through National Amusements' holdings of Viacom's stock.

In 2002, Viacom's MTV Networks International bought independently run Dutch music video channel TMF, which at the time was broadcasting in Belgium and the Netherlands. In June 2004, MTVNI bought VIVA Media AG, the German equivalent to MTV. The same month, plans were announced to dispose of Viacom's interest in Blockbuster later that year by means of an exchange offer; the spinoff of Blockbuster was completed in October.

Also in 2002, Viacom acquired the remaining shares of Infinity Broadcasting radio chain, which resulted in Viacom's return to operating radio stations after it originally exited the broadcast radio business in 1997. In April 2003, Viacom acquired the remaining ownership shares of Comedy Central from then-AOL Time Warner, integrating Comedy Central into MTV Networks.

=== Viacom Cable ===
From its formation until 1995, Viacom operated several cable television systems generally located in the Dayton, San Francisco, Nashville and Seattle metropolitan areas. Several of these were originally independent systems that CBS acquired in the 1960s. The division was known as Viacom Cablevision until the early 1990s, when it was renamed to Viacom Cable. By 1995, Viacom Cable had about 1.1 million subscribers. Viacom sold the division to TCI in 1995. Viacom's cable assets are now part of Comcast.

=== Corporate spin-off ===
CBS Corporation logo (2005–2019)

In March 2005, Viacom announced that it would split into two companies – one would contain Viacom's "slow-growth" assets; the other would consist of the company's "high-growth" divisions – under National Amusements' control because of a stagnating stock price. The internal rivalry between CBS chairman Les Moonves and MTV Networks chief executive officer Tom Freston, and the controversy of the Super Bowl XXXVIII halftime show were also seen as factors. After the departure of Mel Karmazin in 2004, Redstone, who was chairman and CEO, decided to split the offices of president and chief operating officer between Moonves and Freston. Redstone was set to retire in the near future, and a split would be a creative solution to the matter of replacing him.

Logo of the spun-off Viacom (2005–2019), introduced on December 31, 2005

The existing Viacom would become the second CBS Corporation as it was headed by Moonves and kept CBS, Simon & Schuster, and Paramount Network Television (now known as CBS Studios), among other assets; while MTV Networks, BET Networks, and Paramount Pictures would spin-off to a sister company headed by Freston under the Viacom name. The split was approved by Viacom's board on June 14, 2005, and took effect on December 31. The second iterations of CBS Corporation and Viacom began trading on January 3, 2006.

Logo of ViacomCBS (2019–2022), introduced on December 4, 2019

On August 13, 2019, CBS and Viacom officially announced their re-merger deal; the combined company would be called ViacomCBS, with Bob Bakish as president and CEO and Shari Redstone as the chairwoman of the new company. The deal was closed on December 4.

== Former Viacom-owned stations ==
Stations are arranged alphabetically by state and community of license.

=== Radio stations ===
Notes:

- Two boldface asterisks appearing following a station's call letters (**) indicate a station that was purchased from Sonderling Broadcasting in 1980, which initiated Viacom's entry into radio station ownership (WAST television in Albany was also purchased through the Sonderling deal);
- This list does not include stations owned by CBS Radio and its predecessors, Westinghouse Broadcasting and Infinity Broadcasting which were acquired by Viacom through its merger with CBS in 2000.

AM Stations	FM Stations

City of license/Market	Station	Years owned	Current status
Los Angeles, CA	KJOI/KXEZ/KYSR 98.7	1990–1997	owned by iHeartMedia
Los Angeles, CA	KQLZ/KXEZ/KIBB 100.3	1993–1997	KKLQ, owned by Educational Media Foundation
San Francisco, CA	KDIA 1310 **	1980–1983	KMKY, owned by Akai Broadcasting Corporation
San Francisco, CA	KDBK/KSRY-FM–98.9	1990–1994	KSOL, owned by Univision Radio
San Francisco, CA	KDBQ/KYLZ/KSRI 99.1	1990–1994	KSQL, owned by Univision Radio
Denver, CO	KHOW 630	1990–1992	owned by iHeartMedia
Denver, CO	KHOW-FM/KSYY 95.7	1990–1992	KDHT, owned by iHeartMedia
Washington, DC–Arlington, VA	WMZQ/WZHF 1390	1984–1997	owned by Multicultural Broadcasting
Washington, DC–Arlington, VA	WOL-AM 1450 **	1980	owned by Urban One
Washington, DC–Arlington, VA	WCPT 730	1993–1997	WTNT, owned by Metro Radio
Washington, DC–Arlington, VA	WMZQ-FM 98.7 **	1980–1997	owned by iHeartMedia
Washington, DC–Arlington, VA	WCXR-FM 105.9	1993–1997	WMAL-FM, owned by Cumulus Media
Chicago, IL	WLAK/WLIT-FM 93.9	1982–1997	owned by iHeartMedia
Detroit, MI	WLTI/WDRQ 93.1	1988–1997	WUFL, owned by Family Life Radio
New York City, NY	WWRL 1600 **	1980–1982	owned by iHeartMedia
New York City, NY	WKHK/WLTW 106.7 **	1980–1997	owned by iHeartMedia
New York City, NY	WAXQ 104.3	1996–1997	owned by iHeartMedia
Memphis, TN	WDIA 1070 **	1980–1983	owned by iHeartMedia
Memphis, TN	WRVR 680	1985–1988	WMFS, owned by Audacy, Inc.
Memphis, TN	WRVR-FM 104.5 **	1980–1988	owned by Audacy, Inc.
Houston, TX	KIKK 650 **	1980–1993	owned by Audacy, Inc.
Houston, TX	KIKK-FM 95.7 **	1980–1993	KKHH, owned by Audacy, Inc.
Seattle–Tacoma, WA	KBSG 1210	1989–1996	KMIA, owned by Bustos Media Holdings, LLC
Seattle–Tacoma, WA	KBSG-FM 97.3	1987–1996	KIRO-FM, owned by Bonneville International
Seattle–Tacoma, WA	KNDD 107.7	1992–1996	owned by Audacy, Inc.

=== Television stations ===
This list does not include other stations owned by Paramount Stations Group which were acquired by Viacom through its acquisition of Paramount Pictures in 1994, nor any other station purchased by Viacom/Paramount following the Paramount acquisition and prior to its merger with CBS in 2000.

City of license / market	Station	Channel	Years owned	Current status
New Britain–Hartford–New Haven, CT	WVIT	30	1978–1994	NBC owned-and-operated (O&O)
New Britain–Hartford–New Haven, CT	WTXX ^{1}	20	1993–1994	The CW affiliate WCCT, owned by Tegna Inc.
Shreveport, LA–Texarkana, TX	KSLA-TV	12	1983–1994	CBS affiliate owned by Gray Television
St. Louis, MO	KMOV	4	1986–1994	CBS affiliate owned by Gray Television
Albany– Schenectady–Troy, NY	WAST/WNYT	13	1980–1994	NBC affiliate owned by Hubbard Broadcasting
Rochester, NY	WHEC-TV	10	1983–1994	NBC affiliate owned by Hubbard Broadcasting

- ^{1} WTXX was owned by Counterpoint Communications, but Viacom operated the station through a part-time local marketing agreement.
