= Kathy Freston =

American self-help writer

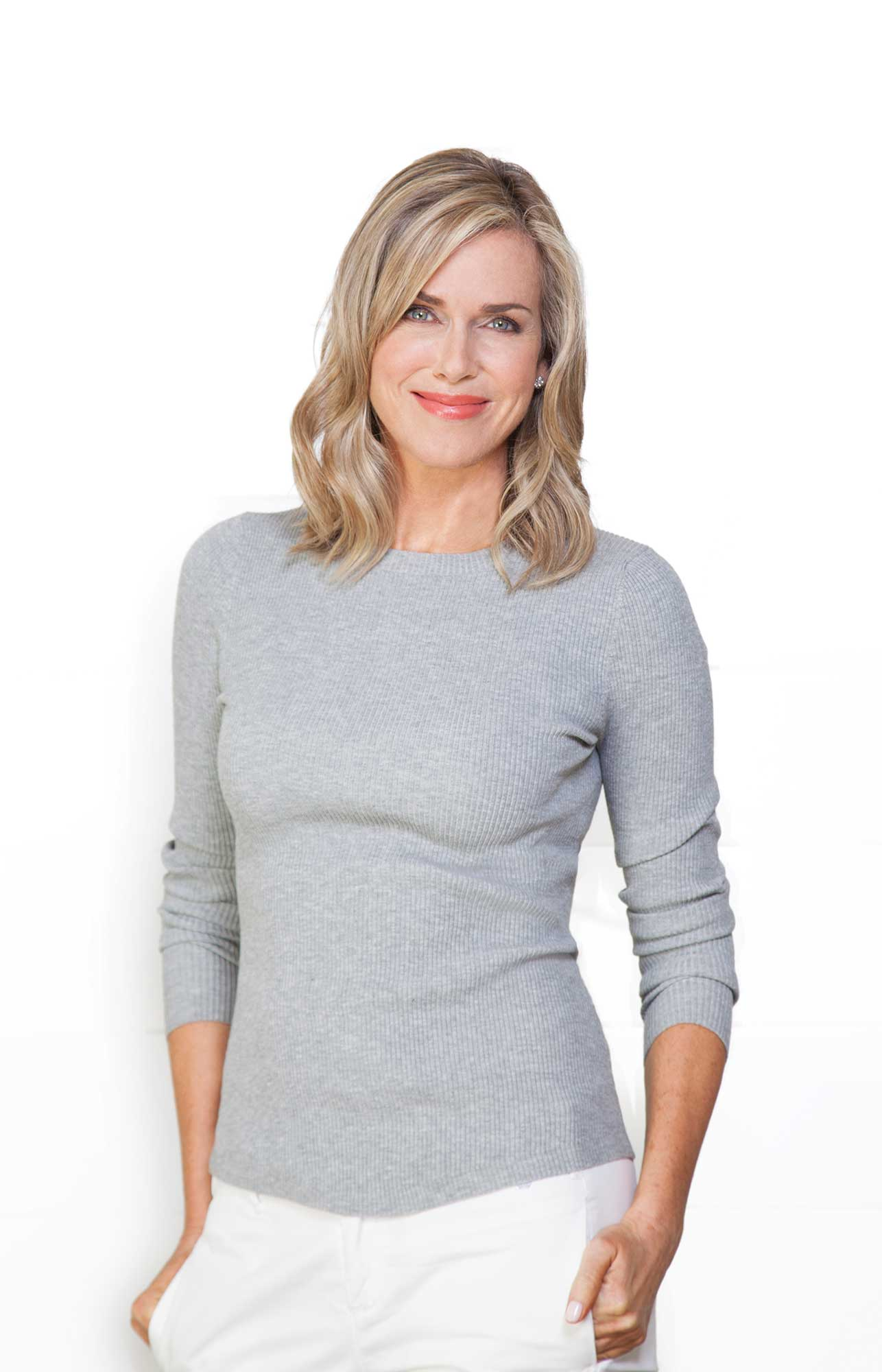
- Freston at the Farm Sanctuary 25th Anniversary Gala in New York City
- Born: 1964 or 1965 (age 60–61); United States
- Occupations: Author; Wellness Activist
- Spouse: Tom Freston (divorced)
- Website: kathyfreston.com

Kathy Freston is an American author and promoter of plant-based nutrition. Her books include The Lean, Veganist, Quantum Wellness, Clean Protein and 72 Reasons to Be Vegan.

== Biography ==
=== Early life ===
Freston grew up in Doraville and later in Dunwoody, a suburb outside of Atlanta Her mother, Joan, and her father, Bill, worked together in a printing store they owned in Dunwoody; she has two younger brothers, Kevin and Jon.

Freston started studying meditation in her spare time and began making her own guided meditation recordings. She said, "… I started creating tapes for friends and realized, "Hey, this is very useful to people". People "came to her for counselling," and so she became a meditation counsellor, helping people find relationships or create abundance, get pregnant, or deal with the disease. She helped Cyrinda Fox, ex-wife of Steven Tyler, find peace with her cancer diagnosis and became a minister long enough to preside over the wedding of Cyrinda Fox to her boyfriend while on her deathbed.

== Career ==
Freston's book, The Lean: A Revolutionary (and Simple!) 30-Day Plan for Healthy, Lasting Weight Loss, was named one of VegNews' "Top 12 Vegan Books of 2012."

She has appeared on The Oprah Winfrey Show and across Winfrey's network relating to a detox diet.

In January 2014, Freston launched a Change.org petition titled "It's Time for a Healthy, Meatless Option (Please!)" urging McDonald's to debut a vegetarian burger item. In November 2020, McDonald's announced they would be creating a plant-based platform called "McPlant" that could lead to a plant-based burger being available on menus at McDonald's in 2021.

Freston supported California's Prop 2, a ballot measure that – among other things – required that by January 1, 2015, egg-laying hens raised in California be able to stand up, lie down, turn around, and fully extend their wings.

From 2011 to 2017, she occasionally published articles in the HuffPost.

In 2021, Freston co-authored the book 72 Reasons to Be Vegan with Gene Stone.

== Awards ==
Freston was awarded "Person of the Year" by VegNews Magazine in 2011.

Freston was awarded with the "Healthy Living Advocate Award" by Farm Sanctuary at the 25th Anniversary Farm Sanctuary gala in 2011.

Last Chance for Animals (LCA) has honoured Freston with their "Vegan of the Year" award for 2016.

== Personal life ==
Freston wed Tom Freston on April 18, 1998 in California. She was a stepmother to his two sons, Andrew and Gil. Kathy and Tom split their time between their New York and Los Angeles residences. They traveled widely, entertained regularly at their townhouse (which once belonged to Andy Warhol) and were frequently photographed at MTVN events and cultural galas.

Freston was added to Vanity Fair's 2009 "International Best-Dressed List."

They divorced in 2012 but remain friends.

== Selected publications ==
- 72 Reasons to Be Vegan: Why Plant-Based. Why Now. (Workman Publishing Company, 2021)
- Clean Protein: The Revolution that Will Reshape Your Body, Boost Your Energy—and Save Our Planet (Hachette Books, 2018)
- The Book of Veganish: The Ultimate Guide to Easing into a Plant-Based, Cruelty-Free, Awesomely Delicious Way to Eat, with 70 Easy Recipes Anyone can Make: A Cookbook (Pam Krauss/Avery, 2016)
- The Lean: A Revolutionary (and Simple!) 30-Day Plan for Healthy, Lasting Weight Loss (Weinstein, 2012)
- Veganist: Lose Weight, Get Healthy, Change the World. New York City: Weinstein Books. 2011-02-01. ISBN 978-1-60286-133-6.
- The Quantum Wellness Cleanse: A 21 Day Essential Guide to Healing Your Body, Mind, and Spirit (Weinstein, 2009)
- Quantum Wellness: A Practical and Spiritual Guide to Health and Happiness (Weinstein, 2008)
- The One (Hyperion, 2006)
- Expect a Miracle (St. Martin's Press, 2003)
