= Brandon Korff =

American - Israeli businessman (born 20th century)

- Born: 20th century
- Education: George Washington University (BA)
- Occupation: Businessman
- Parent(s): Shari Redstone (mother); Yitzhak Aharon Korff (father)

Brandon Korff (born 20th century) is an American billionaire businessman and former heir to Paramount Global. Korff was a director of National Amusements until its 2025 merger into Paramount Skydance.

Korff is the son of media executive Shari Redstone, the former non-executive chairwoman of Paramount Global, and rabbi Yitzhak Aharon Korff.

== Early life and education ==
Korff received a Bachelor of Arts degree from George Washington University in 2006.

== Career ==
Korff worked at MTV Networks and at National Amusements before co-founding the real estate company Panoply Properties in 2011.

In September 2016, Korff joined the board of National Amusements, the Redstone family's holding company, which controlled CBS Corporation and Viacom. According to Ynetnews and The Jerusalem Post, Korff was behind the sale of the family's controlling stake in Paramount to David Ellison's Skydance Media, completed in 2025 at a valuation of about $35 billion.

== Personal life ==
Korff was in a three-year relationship with Israeli model Yael Shelbia. During the COVID-19 pandemic in June 2020, Korff was granted an exceptional permit to enter Israel to visit his brother Tyler, who was serving in the Israel Defense Forces (IDF). Korff was subsequently deported from Israel for breaching quarantine rules, according to Israel's Population and Immigration Authority. He was permitted to return to Israel the following month; according to Israel Hayom, authorities appeared to concede that his removal may have been excessive.

In 2025, Korff applied for residency in Israel. A senior government official described the application as a show of solidarity with Israel amid international hostility, calling it "a positive and significant step for Israel".

== Philanthropy ==
Korff endowed the Brandon Korff Influencers Program at Reichman University, a public diplomacy and media initiative to shape Israel's public image around the world. Guest speakers include Israeli-Palestinian vlogger Nas Daily.

In the aftermath of the 2023 October 7 attacks in Israel, Korff has supported projects including The Children of October 7 being acquired and made available on Paramount+. He also supported Paramount's involvement in We Will Dance Again, a separate documentary about the Nova music festival massacre. He has donated to Israeli causes including support for IDF soldiers, and has hosted Shabbat dinners and holiday celebrations for lone soldiers.

Korff was included in The Jerusalem Post's list of the 50 most influential Jews in 2025 and 2026, and in Ynetnews's 2025 list of the 30 most influential Jewish leaders.
