= Sumner Redstone =

American business and media magnate (1923–2020)

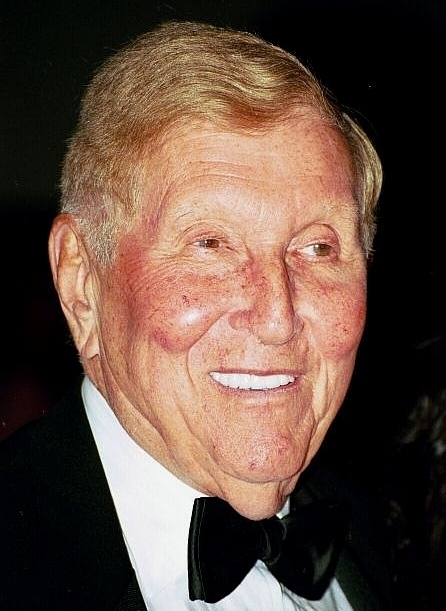
- Redstone in 2001
- Born: Sumner Murray Rothstein; May 27, 1923; Boston, Massachusetts, US
- Died: August 11, 2020 (aged 97); Los Angeles, California, US
- Burial place: Sharon Memorial Park; Sharon, Massachusetts
- Education: Boston Latin School
- Alma mater: Harvard University (AB, LLB)
- Occupation: Businessman
- Known for: National Amusements − Chair; ViacomCBS − Chmn. Emeritus
- Spouses: Phyllis Gloria Raphael (m. 1947; div. 1999); Paula Fortunato (m. 2002; div. 2009)
- Children: Brent Redstone; Shari Redstone
- Parents: Michael Redstone (father); Belle Ostrovsky (mother)
- Military career
- Allegiance: United States
- Branch: United States Army
- Service years: 1944–1945
- Rank: First lieutenant
- Unit: Signals Intelligence Service
- Conflict: World War II

Sumner Murray Redstone (né Rothstein; May 27, 1923 – August 11, 2020) was an American billionaire businessman and media magnate. He was the founder and chairman of the second incarnation of Viacom, chairman of CBS Corporation (the two companies merged in 2019, a year before Redstone's death), and the majority owner and chairman of the National Amusements theater chain.

Until his death, Redstone was a majority voting shareholder of the media conglomerate ViacomCBS, the parent company of the Paramount Pictures film studio, the CBS television network, and various cable networks.

According to Forbes, as of April 2020, he was worth US$2.6 billion. Redstone was formerly the executive chairman of both CBS and Viacom. In February 2016, at age 92, Redstone resigned both chairmanships following a court-ordered examination by a geriatric psychiatrist. He was ultimately succeeded by Les Moonves at CBS and Philippe Dauman at Viacom.

== Early life and education ==
Redstone was born Sumner Murray Rothstein in May 27, 1923, in Boston, Massachusetts, to Belle (née Ostrovsky) and Michael Rothstein. Sumner was a second-generation Bostonian; his father, Michael, was born in Boston in 1902 to Galician Jewish parents originally from Kozova, a shtetl in Austro-Hungarian land now in Ukraine. His mother, Bella, was also an American-born child of Jewish immigrants; her parents emigrated to the U.S. from Kyiv early in the 20th century. Redstone had a younger brother named Edward Stanton Redstone.

In 1940, at Sumner's behest, his father changed the family surname from "Rothstein" to "Redstone"; although Sumner credited his father for the name change, friends of the family attribute it more to Sumner. "Red stone" is the translation of the Yiddish name Rothstein. Michael Rothstein owned Northeast Theater Corporation in Dedham, Massachusetts, the forerunner of National Amusements, and the Boston branch of the Latin Quarter Nightclub. As a teenager, Sumner had summer jobs at his father's theaters but "had higher aspirations than the then-still-somewhat-déclassé world of theaters," wrote Keach Hagey.

Redstone attended the Boston Latin School, from which he graduated in 1940 first in his class, and was accepted to Harvard College on scholarship. Among his coursework at Harvard was a Japanese course taught by Professor Edwin O. Reischauer, recommended to him by college administrators based on his study of Latin and Greek in high school. In 1943, Reischauer left Harvard to establish a United States Army Signal Corps training program at Arlington Hall for Japanese translators and cryptanalysts, positions in need during World War II; Redstone would be among Reischauer's students following the professor to Arlington Hall.

Enlisting in the United States Army, Redstone became a second lieutenant in 1944 before being promoted to first lieutenant. He worked with a team at the Signals Intelligence Service that decoded Japanese messages. Despite leaving Harvard for the military, Redstone had completed enough credits that Harvard granted his Bachelor of Arts in the class of 1944 with a concentration in classics and government. After his military service, he attended Georgetown University Law Center before transferring to Harvard Law School and receiving his Bachelor of Laws degree in 1947.

== Career ==
=== Legal career ===
After completing law school, Redstone moved to San Francisco to become a clerk with the United States Court of Appeals for the Ninth Circuit, a job that then paid $43 per week. While employed by the Ninth Circuit, Redstone also taught labor law courses in the evenings at University of San Francisco School of Law. Beginning in 1948, Redstone joined the United States Department of Justice Tax Division as a staff attorney with the appellate tax division, in the immediate aftermath of the Supreme Court case United States v. Paramount Pictures, Inc. when the government was actively combating anti-competitive practices among Paramount Pictures and other major film studios.

After two years with the Justice Department, Redstone followed his supervisors to private practice in 1950. Then in 1951, Redstone became a partner of the firm Ford, Bergson, Adams, Borkland, & Redstone with two of his former Justice Department supervisors Herbert Bergson and Herbert Borkland, along with former Deputy Attorney General Peyton Ford. In the 1954 U.S. Supreme Court case Holland v. United States, Redstone represented the plaintiffs, a married couple of hotel owners convicted of tax evasion following a sudden rise in their net worth. Although the court would uphold their conviction, Redstone's argument that the government had the burden of proof in proving tax evasion in unusual increases in net worth would later become Internal Revenue Service policy.

=== Northeast Theatre Corporation (later National Amusements) ===
In 1954, he joined his father's theater chain Northeast Theatre Corporation, which then had fourteen drive-in theaters in five eastern states. The Redstone family re-incorporated Northeast Theatre Corporation and their other businesses as National Amusements in 1959 to access more money to finance expansion; Redstone would invest nearly $18,000 in stock and be named vice president. In 1964, Redstone was elected president of the Theater Owners of America, which would merge with a rival group to form the National Association of Theatre Owners, for which Redstone became chairman in 1965.

Redstone became CEO of National Amusements in 1967. The company had 93 theater screens (52 drive-ins and 41 indoor) when Redstone took office; within 10 years, National Amusements had nearly 250 screens. After watching the first Star Wars film in 1977, Redstone directed National Amusements to buy a five percent stake in 20th Century Fox, distributor of Star Wars. Having bought Fox for $8 a share, National Amusements sold Fox at $60 after Marvin Davis bought the company. National Amusements' other investments in Columbia Pictures, Orion Pictures, and Paramount Pictures also had large returns on investment in the early 1980s.

In 2025, Barry Diller stated that Redstone regularly bribed former Paramount CEO Frank Yablans, with former Paramount chairman Charlie Bluhdorn having knowledge of this.

=== Viacom ===
As a hedge against slow growth in movie theaters, Redstone began buying stock in Viacom International in 1985. Viacom spun off from CBS in 1971 after the FCC ruled at the time that television networks could not syndicate their own programs. Viacom initially syndicated CBS network shows such as Gunsmoke, Hawaii Five-O, and I Love Lucy.

Viacom also owned MTV Networks (formerly known as Warner-AMEX Satellite Entertainment), which owned MTV and Nickelodeon. In addition, other properties included pay television networks Showtime and The Movie Channel. Viacom acquired MTV Networks in 1985 for $550 million from Steve Ross' Warner Communications.

After a four-month hostile takeover, Redstone won voting control of Viacom for $3.4 billion on March 4, 1987.

=== Paramount Pictures ===
Redstone's next acquisition was Paramount Communications (previously Gulf+Western), parent of Paramount Pictures, in 1994. Engaging in a bidding war with QVC president Barry Diller and TCI president John Malone, Redstone had to raise his bid at least three times from $7.5 billion to $10.1 billion. Some analysts at the time estimated that Redstone overpaid by billions, and Viacom would accrue nearly $10 billion in debt after acquiring Paramount. However, the sale of certain assets such as Madison Square Garden to Cablevision and Simon & Schuster for $4.6 billion to Pearson PLC would eventually help Viacom improve financially, with its stock price in 1998 approaching $60, breaking its 1995 record high. Under Redstone's leadership, Paramount produced such popular, award-winning films as Saving Private Ryan, Titanic, Braveheart, Forrest Gump, and Mission: Impossible.

Redstone replaced the team of Jonathan Dolgen and Sherry Lansing in 2004. After arriving at Paramount in 2005, chairman and chief executive officer Brad Grey led a return to fortune at the box office. He oversaw the creation or revitalization of several major franchises, including Transformers, Star Trek and Paranormal Activity. Paramount also forged productive relationships with top-tier filmmakers and talent including J. J. Abrams, Michael Bay and Martin Scorsese. The 2010 Paramount slate achieved much success with Shutter Island and a True Grit remake, reaching the biggest box office totals in the storied careers of Martin Scorsese and the Coen Brothers, respectively. In addition, during Grey's tenure, Paramount launched its own worldwide releasing arm, Paramount Pictures International, and has released acclaimed films such as An Inconvenient Truth, Up in the Air, and There Will Be Blood.

He also purchased Blockbuster Entertainment, which included Aaron Spelling's production company and a huge library of films, much of which has been merged into Paramount Pictures. Blockbuster has now been spun off into its independent entity. Redstone acquired CBS Corporation in 2000 and then spun it off as a separate company in 2005, taking with it all of Paramount's television shows and catalog.

In December 2005, Paramount agreed to buy DreamWorks SKG for an estimated $1.6 billion. The acquisition was completed on February 1, 2006. Subsequent financing brought Viacom's investment down to $700 million. The animation studio, DreamWorks Animation, was not included in the deal as it has been its own company since late 2004. However, Paramount had the rights to distribute films by DreamWorks Animation until 2013.

On June 1, 2012, Paramount Pictures renamed the Administration Building on the studio lot the Sumner Redstone Building in a dedication ceremony attended by employees of Paramount Pictures and Viacom.

=== CBS ===
One of Redstone's largest acquisitions came in the form of Viacom's former parent, CBS. After the FCC modified regulations in 1999 to allow companies to own two television stations in the same media market, CBS president and former Viacom President and COO Mel Karmazin proposed a merger with Redstone. On September 7, 1999, Redstone and Karmazin announced that Viacom would buy CBS for $37.3 billion, at the time the biggest media merger of the twentieth century; the newly merged Viacom/CBS would become the second largest media company behind Time Warner. Viacom had a wide range of assets such as the CBS and UPN broadcast networks; cable television networks including MTV, VH1, Nickelodeon, a half stake of Comedy Central, and BET; the pay television network Showtime, radio (Infinity Broadcasting, which produced the Howard Stern radio shows), Paramount Pictures, Paramount Television, and King World Productions.

After CBS and Viacom split in 2005, Redstone remained chairman of both companies, but two separate CEOs were appointed for each company, Les Moonves for CBS and Tom Freston for Viacom.

In 2007, former CBS Evening News anchor Dan Rather sued CBS and other parties such as Redstone in New York state court for breach of contract after CBS declined to renew his contract following a controversy over a story by Rather on 60 Minutes II about then-President George W. Bush's military service. The New York Court of Appeals dismissed the case in 2009.

=== Succession ===
Redstone's trusts made it clear that his daughter, Shari Redstone (vice-chairwoman of the board of Viacom and CBS as well as president of National Amusements), was set to assume his role upon his death. However, a November 22, 2006, New York Times article indicated that Redstone was reconsidering his daughter's role. In 2007, they feuded publicly over issues of corporate governance and the future of the cinema chain.

Documents were made public which verify that, as part of a settlement from Sumner Redstone's first divorce, all of his stock was in irrevocable trusts that was to be left for his grandchildren. On March 1, 2010, Redstone publicly confirmed that all of his stock would be left for his five grandchildren (Brandon Korff, Kimberlee Korff, Tyler Korff, Keryn Redstone, and Lauren Redstone).

Redstone made arrangements to step down as CEO of Viacom in 2006. After Mel Karmazin resigned in 2004, two heirs apparent were named: Co-President and Co-COO Les Moonves (who was number 2 to Karmazin at CBS; he was the former head of Warner Bros. Television and before that, Lorimar Television) and Co-President and Co-COO Tom Freston (who had been president and CEO of MTV Networks since 1987 and had been with the company since the formation of MTV Networks' precursor company, Warner-AMEX Satellite Entertainment). After the Viacom split was approved by the board on June 14, 2005, Moonves headed CBS Corporation, and Freston headed the second incarnation of Viacom.

On September 5, 2006, Redstone removed Freston as president and CEO of Viacom and replaced him with director and former Viacom counsel Philippe Dauman. Redstone also brought back former CFO Tom Dooley. This was surprising to many, as Freston had been seen by many as Redstone's heir apparent, and Redstone had touted that Freston would run the company after he retired. Redstone publicly stated that he let Freston go because of Viacom's lack of aggressiveness in the digital/online arena, lack of contact with investors, and a lackluster upfront (coupled with falling viewership) at MTV Networks.

In February 2016, at age 92, after a court-ordered examination by a geriatric psychiatrist whose findings were not publicly disclosed, Redstone relinquished the chairmanship of CBS to Moonves and the chairmanship of Viacom to Dauman. In May 2016, Los Angeles Superior Court Judge David Cowan dismissed a lawsuit alleging that Redstone was mentally incompetent. The judge stated it was "not in dispute that Redstone suffers from either mild or moderate dementia." In addition, his speech was severely impaired due to a bout with aspiration pneumonia in 2014. Two weeks later, another such lawsuit was filed in Massachusetts.

=== Holdings ===
At the time of his death, Redstone owned over 70% of the voting interest of ViacomCBS. ViacomCBS was controlled by Redstone through National Amusements. Redstone sold his holdings of Midway Games, of over 89%, in December 2008.

== Books ==
Redstone's autobiography, A Passion to Win (co-written with author Peter Knobler), was published in 2001 by Viacom's Simon & Schuster. This book details Redstone's life from a young boy in Boston to the difficult takeover of Viacom and the problems he overcame in purchasing and managing both Blockbuster Video and Paramount Pictures. The book also recounts the CBS merger (Viacom was a spin-off company of CBS to syndicate its programs, and the subsidiary bought the parent almost 30 years later). Succession creator Jesse Armstrong has stated that Redstone's biography A Passion to Win was an influence in creating the series.

Viacom's broadcasting properties at the time of A Passion to Win's release included several radio stations and two TV stations: WBZ CBS 4, which had just become a CBS O&O through a merger with Westinghouse four years before Viacom and CBS merged, and WSBK UPN 38 in Redstone's hometown, Boston.

In 2023, the book Unscripted: The Epic Battle for a Hollywood Media Empire was published in Cornerstone Press (Penguin Books), written by James B. Stewart and Rachel Abrams. The book tells the story of the Redstone dynasty.

== Political views ==
A longtime Democratic supporter, with a history of donating to many Democratic campaigns, including regular donations to Ted Kennedy, John Kerry, and former Senate Majority Leader Tom Daschle, Redstone endorsed Republican George W. Bush over Kerry in the 2004 Presidential election, allegedly because he argued that Bush would be better for his company and the economy. Despite this public endorsement, he donated money to Kerry during the primaries.

== Philanthropy ==
Redstone contributed over $150 million to various philanthropic causes.

- In April 2007, Redstone announced a commitment of $105 million in charitable grants to fund research and patient care advancements in cancer and burn recovery at three major non-profit healthcare organizations. The cash contributions of $35 million were each paid out over five years to FasterCures/The Center for Accelerating Medical Solutions, based in Washington, D.C.; the Cedars-Sinai Prostate Cancer Center in Los Angeles, California; and the Massachusetts General Hospital in Boston, Massachusetts.
- Up to at least 2012, Redstone contributed $1.5 million to the Global Poverty Project.
- He gave millions of dollars to the Cambodian Children's Fund, a nonprofit program that provides a wide range of critical health and educational services to impoverished and abused children in the capital city of Phnom Penh. Redstone's contribution will be used to create the Sumner M. Redstone Child Rescue Center, a stand-alone facility originally scheduled to open during the fall of 2007 for children 5 to 16. In subsequent years Redstone continued to support this organization.
- In early 2010, Redstone pledged a $1 million gift to Autism Speaks in support of scientific research into the causes of autism and effective treatments. Redstone had given financial support to Autism Speaks previously. In 2011, Redstone gave an additional $500,000 to the group in support of its Translational Research Initiative, bringing his cumulative lifetime contribution to Autism Speaks to $1.7 million.
- In July 2010, Redstone donated $24 million to the Keck School of Medicine of the University of Southern California to support cancer research.
- In September 2012, Redstone donated $18 million to the Boston University School of Law. The gift funded, in part, the construction of the five-story Sumner M. Redstone Building, a classroom building that opened in 2014.
- Since October 2012, Redstone donated a total of $350,000 to the Go Campaign, which funds projects in 21 countries with a focus on helping orphans and other needy children.
- In May 2013, the Sumner M. Redstone Charitable Foundation donated $1 million to Literacy Inc., a New York City-based nonprofit literacy organization.
- In January 2014, it was announced that the Sumner M. Redstone Charitable Foundation had donated $10 million to Harvard Law School for public interest fellowships, the largest charitable contribution ever made to the law school in support of public service. The money supports students who work in public-interest positions after graduation.

== Personal life ==
Redstone married Phyllis Gloria Raphael on July 4, 1947. They had two children: Brent Redstone and Shari Redstone. In 1999, they divorced when Phyllis Raphael served Sumner Redstone a $3 billion divorce lawsuit which accused the mogul of adultery and cruelty. Sumner was seen with Hollywood producer Christine Peters in Paris and was quoted as saying at the time that he "wanted to spend the rest of his life with Christine." As a result of the divorce, Redstone moved to Los Angeles where he continued to romantically pursue Peters. Peters went on to produce the hit romantic comedy How to Lose a Guy in 10 Days in Canada. As Redstone's patience ran out, he married Paula Fortunato, a former primary school teacher 39 years his junior. Redstone filed for divorce from Fortunato on October 17, 2008. Their divorce was finalized on January 22, 2009. Redstone owned a house in the Beverly Park area of Los Angeles, which he purchased in 2002 for $14.5 million.

On March 29, 1979, he suffered severe burns in a fire at the Copley Plaza hotel, in Boston, but survived after 30 hours of extensive surgery at Massachusetts General Hospital. Though he was warned that he might never be able to live a normal life again, eight years later he was fit enough to insist on playing tennis nearly every day and to launch a hostile takeover of Viacom. Redstone discussed the story of surviving the fire as a reflection of his strong determination and will to live.

In July 2010, Redstone was caught on tape trying to find the source of an embarrassing leak within MTV. Redstone offered money and protection to a journalist if he would give up his source. Redstone had been pushing MTV management to give more airtime to the band the Electric Barbarellas. In the message, Redstone tells the reporter that "we're not going to kill" the source, adding "We just want to talk to him". The 87-year-old Redstone also told the reporter he would be "well rewarded and well protected" if he would reveal the source. Peter Lauria told NBC's Today show he would not do it. Viacom Inc. spokesman Carl Folta confirmed to Today that it was Redstone's voice on the message and said he had made a mistake. A Viacom source told the New York Post, "Sumner wants to be consequential. Sumner is really proud of what he did. This guy is loving it… He likes people to know he's still alive".

In August 2015, Redstone split with his live-in girlfriend, Sydney Holland, after five years together.

In January 2019, Redstone and his family settled with his former live-in companion Manuela Herzer. According to MarketWatch, "Herzer agreed to pay back $3.25 million of the tens of millions of gifts that Redstone gave her", and "the wide-ranging agreement ends all litigation between the two sides, who have been battling in the courts since the fall of 2015 when Redstone kicked Herzer out of his Beverly Hills mansion, replaced her as his health-care agent and wrote her out of his estate planning."

On August 11, 2020, Redstone died at his home in Los Angeles at the age of 97 due to natural causes.

The film Mission: Impossible – Dead Reckoning Part One is in memory of Redstone.
