= Merger of CBS and Viacom =

2019 merger transaction

- Logos before the merger

- Logo after the merger
- Initiator: CBS Corporation
- Target: Viacom
- Type: Merger
- Cost: US$15.4 billion
- Initiated: August 13, 2019; 7 years ago
- Completed: December 4, 2019; 6 years ago
- Resulting entity: ViacomCBS (renamed Paramount Global)

CBS Corporation and Viacom announced their intention to merge on August 13, 2019 for $15.4 billion. The merger of equals would reunite the CBS Corporation and Viacom into a single company for the first time since the 2005 split from the first Viacom, and would be valued at $28 billion.

After an unsuccessful negotiation by majority owner National Amusements in 2016, negotiations of a merger were renewed in January 2018, but in September, Les Moonves resigned as CEO of CBS Corporation due to accusations of sexual assault. National Amusements chose not to propose the merger for a certain period after the settlement. Nonetheless, CBS Corporation planned to acquire Viacom in August, days before the merger was formally announced. The merger was approved by National Amusements in October and later closed on December 4, 2019.

The merged entity formed ViacomCBS, which was later renamed to Paramount Global in February 2022. Like its predecessors, it was majority owned by National Amusements until its merger with Skydance Media, which formed Paramount Skydance in August 2025.

== Background ==
The first incarnation of Viacom was created in 1952 as the television syndication division of CBS; it was spun off in 1971. In 1999, Viacom acquired its former parent, then named CBS Corporation (formerly Westinghouse Electric). On December 31, 2005, the first Viacom was spun off into two entities, the second incarnations of CBS Corporation and Viacom.

== History ==
=== Early discussions of a merger (September 2016–September 2018) ===
Efforts to re-merge the two conglomerates began on September 29, 2016, when National Amusements sent a letter to Viacom and CBS Corporation encouraging a re-merger of the two companies. The proposal was later withdrawn on December 12 of that year.

On January 12, 2018, CNBC reported that Viacom had re-entered talks to merge back into CBS Corporation, after AT&T's acquisition of Time Warner and Disney's acquisition of most 21st Century Fox assets were announced. Viacom and CBS Corporation also faced heavy competition from companies such as Netflix and Amazon. Shortly afterward, it was reported that the combined company could be a suitor for acquiring the film studio Lionsgate. Viacom and Lionsgate were both interested in acquiring The Weinstein Company (TWC). Following the Weinstein effect, Viacom was listed as one of 22 potential buyers that were interested in acquiring TWC. They lost the bid, and on March 1, it was announced that Maria Contreras-Sweet would acquire all of TWC's assets for $500 million.

On March 30, 2018, CBS Corporation made an all-stock offer slightly below Viacom's market value, insisting that its existing leadership, including long-time chairman and CEO Les Moonves, oversee the re-combined company. Viacom rejected the offer as too low, requesting a $2.8 billion increase and that Bob Bakish be maintained as president and COO under Moonves. These conflicts had resulted from Shari Redstone seeking more control over CBS Corporation and its leadership.

Eventually, on May 14, 2018, CBS Corporation sued its and Viacom's parent company National Amusements and accused Redstone of abusing her voting power in the company and forcing a merger that was not supported by it or Viacom. CBS Corporation also accused Redstone of discouraging Verizon Communications from acquiring it, which could have been beneficial to its shareholders.

On May 23, 2018, Les Moonves explained that he considered the Viacom channels to be an "albatross," and while he favored more content for CBS All Access (now Paramount+), he believed that there were better deals for CBS Corporation than the Viacom deal, such as Metro-Goldwyn-Mayer (MGM), Lionsgate Films or Sony Pictures. Moonves also considered Bakish a threat because he did not want an ally of Redstone as a board member of the combined company.

=== Talks following Les Moonves's resignation (September 2018–August 2019) ===
On September 9, 2018, Les Moonves exited CBS Corporation following multiple accusations of sexual assault. National Amusements agreed to make no proposal of a CBS Corporation-Viacom merger for at least two years after the date of the settlement.

On May 30, 2019, CNBC reported that CBS Corporation and Viacom would explore merger discussions in mid-June. CBS Corporation's board of directors was revamped with people who were open to merging; the re-merger was made possible with the resignation of Moonves, who had opposed all merger attempts. The talks had started following rumors of CBS Corporation acquiring Starz from Lionsgate. Reports said that CBS Corporation and Viacom reportedly set August 8 as an informal deadline for reaching an agreement to recombine the two media companies. CBS Corporation announced its plan to acquire Viacom as part of the re-merger deal for up to $15.4 billion.

On August 2, 2019, it was reported that CBS Corporation and Viacom agreed to merge back into one entity. Both companies came to an agreement on the management team for the merger, with Bob Bakish as CEO of the combined company with president and acting CEO of CBS Corporation, Joseph Ianniello, overseeing CBS Corporation-branded assets. On August 7, CBS Corporation and Viacom separately reported their quarterly earnings as the talks about the re-merger continued.

=== Completion (August 2019–December 2019) ===
On August 13, 2019, CBS Corporation and Viacom officially announced their merger; the combined company was named ViacomCBS; Shari Redstone was the chairwoman of the new company. Upon the merger agreement, Viacom and CBS Corporation jointly announced they expected the transaction to close by the end of 2019, pending regulatory and shareholder approvals. Such mergers require approval by the Federal Trade Commission (FTC).

On October 28, 2019, the merger was approved by National Amusements, which then announced the deal would close in early December; the recombined company will trade its shares on NASDAQ under the symbols "VIAC" and "VIACA" after CBS Corporation delisted its shares on the New York Stock Exchange (NYSE). On November 25, 2019, Viacom and CBS Corporation announced that the merger would close on December 4, and its shares began to trading on NASDAQ on December 5. The merger officially closed on December 4, 2019.

== Affected assets ==
- CBS Productions – folded into CBS Television Studios (now CBS Studios) on November 28, 2019.
- CBS Films – former mini-major studio; absorbed into the main CBS Entertainment Group (CBS Studios) with the theatrical distribution moved to Paramount Pictures in 2019.
- CBS Television Studios – renamed to CBS Studios.
  - CBS Television Distribution – renamed to CBS Media Ventures in 2021.
    - Terrytoons – Theatrical library moved to Paramount Pictures through Melange Pictures, LLC
    - Spelling Television (from CBS) – library reunited with the Republic Pictures' (from Viacom) Television library.
- Showtime Networks (from CBS) was organized with BET Networks (from Viacom) under the Premium Network Group.
  - BET Networks was later moved to the CBS Entertainment Group.
- MTV, CMT, and other single-branded Viacom and CBS networks were organized under the MTV Entertainment Group.
  - VH1 became part of BET Networks, which was moved under the CBS Entertainment Group.
- Paramount Television (second incarnation by Viacom) – renamed Paramount Television Studios to avoid confusion with the first incarnation (now CBS Studios), later was folded in 2024.
- CBS Interactive – renamed to ViacomCBS Streaming (later Paramount Streaming)
  - CBS All Access – relaunched as Paramount+ on March 4, 2021; merging with the original Nordics SVOD version which was launched in 2017 and the original Latin American SVOD version which was launched in 2019.
    - Nordics, Hungary and Poland SVOD version of Paramount+ – rebranded as SkyShowtime; joint venture with Comcast-owned Sky Group.
  - Showtime (streaming service) – bundled with Paramount+ in 2022 and merged in 2023.
- CBS Consumer Products and Nickelodeon & Viacom Consumer Products (NVCP) are merged; eventually rebranded as ViacomCBS Consumer Products (later Paramount Consumer Products)
- CBS Cable Networks and Viacom Media Networks are merged; with eventually rebranded as ViacomCBS Domestic Media Networks (later Paramount Media Networks)

=== Divested ===
- CNET Media Group – sold to Red Ventures on October 30, 2020.
  - GameRankings – absorbed into Metacritic on December 9, 2019.
- CBS Building/Black Rock – sold to Harbor Group International.
- CBS Studio Center – sold to Hackman Capital Partners and Square Mile Capital Management.
- Simon & Schuster – sold to Kohlberg Kravis Roberts.

== See also ==
- Merger of AOL and Time Warner (2001)
- Acquisition of NBC Universal by Comcast (2011), a similar media merger but entirely vertical scale.
- Merger of Discovery, Inc. and WarnerMedia (2022)
- Merger of Skydance Media and Paramount Global (2025), a 2025 merger transaction between Skydance Media and ViacomCBS/Paramount Global
- Concentration of media ownership
