= King World =

Television production company

King World Productions, Inc.
- Final logo, used from 1998 to 2007
- Type: In-name only unit of CBS Media Ventures
- Traded as: Nasdaq: KWP (until 1999)
- Industry: Television
- Predecessor: Eyemark Entertainment
- Founded: 1964; 62 years ago
- Founder: Charles King
- Defunct: August 20, 2007; 19 years ago
- Fate: Merged with CBS Paramount Domestic Television, currently exists as an in-name only unit of CBS Media Ventures, operating as KWP Studios.
- Successor: CBS Media Ventures
- Headquarters: New York City; Los Angeles; Atlanta
- Services: Television production; Television syndication
- Parent: CBS Corporation (1999–2000; 2005–2007); Viacom (2000–2005)
- Divisions: Camelot Entertainment Sales
- Website: www.paramountpressexpress.com/cbs-media-ventures/

King World Productions, Inc. (also known as King World Entertainment, King World Enterprises, or simply King World) was a production company and syndicator of television programming in the United States founded by Charles King (1912–1972) that was active from 1964 to August 20, 2007.

Following his death, it was run by his son Roger until it was acquired by Viacom's CBS in 1999, and in September 26, 2006, merged with CBS Paramount Domestic Television to form CBS Television Distribution (now CBS Media Ventures). Following Roger King's death, the company and its subsidiary KWP Studios Inc. continue to exist on paper as intellectual property holders who maintain the copyrights for programs like The Little Rascals, Rachael Ray, and the Hollywood Squares format.

== History ==
King World’s second logo, used from 1984 to 1998.

=== Founding with The Little Rascals ===
The division was started in 1964 by Charles King (1912–1972). It was a company that expressly handled television distribution of the Hal Roach-produced Our Gang short comedy films from the 1930s. When Roach lost the rights to the name Our Gang (it was retained by the Metro-Goldwyn-Mayer film studio, who bought the series from Roach in 1938), the shorts were retitled as The Little Rascals.

It was through this acquisition that the comedy shorts made from 1929 through 1938 have been made available to audiences for the past fifty years. King World later co-produced an animated television special with Muller-Rosen Productions and Murakami-Wolf-Swenson in 1979 called The Little Rascals Christmas Special and later co-produced a 1982–1984 animated The Little Rascals television series with Hanna-Barbera. King died in 1972 and the company was taken over by King's children: Roger M. King (1944–2007), Michael (1948–2015), Robert (1940–2020), Diana (1949–2019), Richard (1941–2020), and Karen.

=== 1980s expansion ===
In 1983, the company acquired the syndication rights to NBC's daytime game show Wheel of Fortune. Merv Griffin, the show's creator and producer, had shopped the program to various other studios prior to reaching a deal with King World. King World also would acquire the rights to distribute Griffin's own long-running talk/variety program from Metromedia's syndication division. A year later, Griffin announced plans to revive another of his game show creations, Jeopardy!, and King World agreed to distribute that program as well.

In 1984 King World formed an ad-sales barter division called Camelot Entertainment Sales. Later that year president Robert King left the company to form The Television Program Source; a television syndication company that was founded as a joint venture between King, Alan Bennett, and Columbia Pictures Television. King World also purchased television and film distributor Leo A. Gutman, Inc. whose titles included the theatricals Joan of Arc, Anna Karenina and the Sherlock Holmes and East Side Kids series; and two 1960s television westerns, Branded and The Guns of Will Sonnett.

In 1986, King World signed Oprah Winfrey to a syndication deal and agreed to distribute her Chicago-based daytime talk program nationally, resulting in the premiere of The Oprah Winfrey Show in September of that year. The acquisitions paid off, and Oprah, Jeopardy! and Wheel of Fortune became three of the most popular shows in the history of television syndication, drawing high ratings consistently well into the 21st century. In particular, the success of Oprah eventually led to the creation of the spin-off series Dr. Phil, Rachael Ray, and The Dr. Oz Show.

=== Other acquisitions ===
On February 11, 1985, King World formed the King World Enterprises division to develop joint-venture programs with advertisers and station groups and to handle international distribution for King World and Camelot. In 1987, King World's Camelot Entertainment Sales entered into an agreement with Buena Vista Television, whereas Camelot would sell all national spots for all programming produced by Buena Vista Television, which included Siskel & Ebert, DuckTales, Disney Magic I and Win, Lose or Draw, and Camelot was willing to accept the lower figure because DuckTales represented King World's first foray into the animated strip business, and Disney Magic I marked King World to the barter movie operation business for the first time.

In 1988, the company made its only foray onto television stations when it bought out WIVB-TV in Buffalo for $100 million. King World ended up selling the station to LIN TV Corporation in 1995.

==== Former King World-owned stations ====
Stations are arranged in alphabetical order by state and city of license.

City of license / Market	Station	Channel TV (RF)	Years owned	Current ownership status
Buffalo, New York	WIVB-TV	4 (36)	1988–1995	CBS affiliate owned by Nexstar Media Group

=== 1990s: King World Direct and KWP ===
In the 1990s, King World operated an "As Seen on TV" VHS service called King World Direct.

Stuart Hersch, a lawyer by trade, was the financial expert who helped to take the company public, making it one of the hottest stocks on Wall Street at the time. The company traded as "KWP". King World had virtually no debt and generated hundreds of millions of dollars in revenues after going public.

Television stations that broadcast King World programming had first choice on any series King World offered to distribute.

On November 25, 1991, King World acquired the Hollywood Squares format rights from Orion Pictures after Orion closed down its television division. In 1995, King World made a partner deal with Columbia TriStar Television to launch game shows.

In 1996, King World began co-distributing Geraldo (later The Geraldo Rivera Show) with Tribune Entertainment, and would continue co-distributing the show until its cancellation in 1998.

On September 28, 1999, King World acquired the worldwide leasing rights to the solo-developed game shows by Merrill Heatter Productions for a limited time.

=== Acquisition by CBS ===
In April 1999, King World was acquired by CBS. On January 19, 2000, Eyemark Entertainment, the successor to Westinghouse Broadcasting following the CBS/Westinghouse Electric Corporation merger, was folded into King World. The sale was first discussed on March 28, 1999, for $3 billion. After CBS purchased King World, CBS was bought by Viacom outright in 2000; such buyout was reversed at the end of 2005, when King World became part of the post-split CBS Corporation as well as all of Viacom's former television production and distribution operations.

In its latter days, King World was considered the syndication branch of the CBS network (a role Viacom actually first served upon its creation), having succeeded Eyemark in that role. King World, however, distributed newer CBS shows such as Everybody Loves Raymond while the older shows were syndicated by corporate affiliate CBS Paramount Television, the successor to the original distributor Viacom Enterprises. Additionally, from 2000 to 2006, King World distributed archive programs from Group W, such as The Mike Douglas Show.

On September 26, 2006, CBS announced that King World and CBS Paramount Television's syndication operations would be combined to form the CBS Television Distribution Group (CTD). Roger King was announced as CEO of the new entity and retained that position until suffering a stroke on December 7, 2007, and dying the next day. Paul Franklin then served as President of CTD.

For one year, the King World on-screen identity was kept for the programs it distributed at its closure. However, most of the programs handled by King World were distributed under CTD. On August 20, 2007, CBS Television Distribution introduced a new closing logo to replace the old logos of King World, CBS Paramount Domestic Television, and its predecessors. CBS Television Distribution was renamed CBS Media Ventures in 2021.

== Programming ==
King World was responsible for the highest rated shows in syndication for over two decades. They also had the television rights to a large library of theatrical films. When it was acquired by Westinghouse Electric Corporation in 2000, it distributed a number of CBS-produced series for syndication, such as Everybody Loves Raymond (ancillary rights to this series are owned by HBO), CSI: Crime Scene Investigation, CSI: NY, and CSI: Miami. King World turned part of its attention to producing in-house newsmagazines including American Journal and Inside Edition.
