= Michael Redstone =

American businessman and entrepreneur (1902–1987)

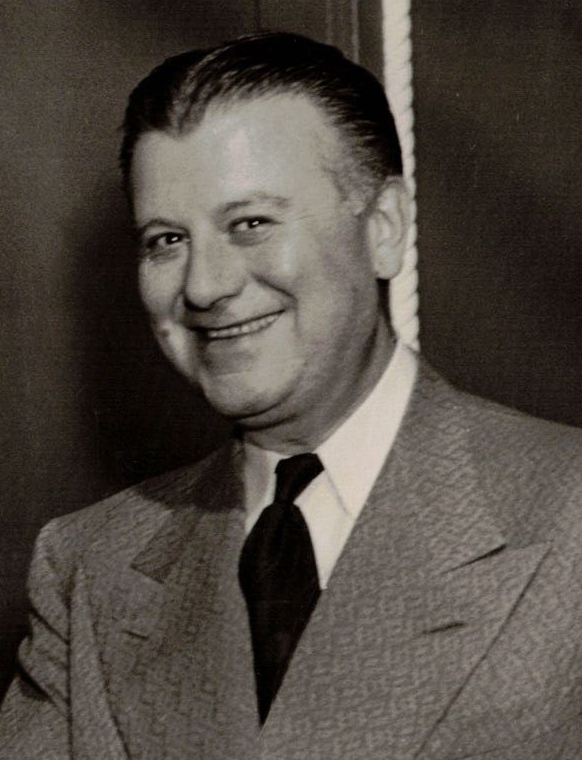
- Redstone in 1947
- Born: Max Rothstein; April 11, 1902; Boston, Massachusetts, U.S.
- Died: April 4, 1987 (aged 84); Bal Harbour, Florida, U.S.
- Occupations: Businessman; theater owner
- Spouse: Belle Ostrovsky Redstone
- Children: 2, including Sumner Redstone

Michael "Mickey" Redstone (born Max Rothstein; April 11, 1902 – April 4, 1987) was an American entrepreneur and founder of the Northeast Theater Corporation, which later became National Amusements.

== Biography ==
Redstone was born on April 11, 1902, in Boston, Massachusetts. Born Max Rothstein, at his son Sumner's behest, he later changed the family name to "Redstone" to avoid association with Jewish gambling boss Arnold Rothstein.

Redstone dropped out of high school to pursue his first business venture, buying a truck and securing a trucking contract with the City of Boston. During this period, he became close with local gambling boss Harry "Doc" Sagansky. In 1934, Redstone and Sagansky started a Boston nightclub, the Mayfair, and purchased a drive-in theater in Valley Stream, Long Island. Both ventures were funded by Sagansky, who contributed "hundreds of thousands of dollars" to Redstone's businesses. The pair also started a Massachusetts loan company, and opened an additional night club, the Latin Quarter, in 1943.

In 1936, Redstone established the Northeast Theater Corporation, which grew rapidly as Redstone purchased land throughout the northeast and built new drive-in theaters. His first in Massachusetts, the Dedham Drive-In, opened on August 11, 1948, though others in the state quickly followed.

By 1954, when his son Sumner left his job to work for the company, Redstone owned three drive-in theaters and had hired his son Edward to help with the business. On August 28, 1959, Northeast was reincorporated as National Amusements, Inc. to consolidate the family's ownership interests and make it easier to obtain financing.

His son, Sumner Redstone, grew National Amusements into one of the largest media conglomerates in the United States, owning one of the three broadcast networks in CBS, the cable television and content provider Viacom (which includes MTV Networks and BET), and the movie studio Paramount Pictures. CBS and Viacom were equal partners in MovieTickets.com.
