= MovieTickets.com =

Movie ticket sales website

- Type: Subsidiary
- Founded: 2000; 26 years ago
- Headquarters: Boca Raton, Florida, USA
- Products: Online movie tickets
- Owners: Versant (75%); Skydance Corporation (25%)
- Parent: Fandango Media
- Website: www.movietickets.com

MovieTickets.com was an online movie ticketing website founded by AMC Theatres and Hollywood.com in 2000; CBS Corporation, Famous Players, and National Amusements all came on board prior to launch; and it is now a subsidiary of Fandango Media. MovieTickets.com provides movie times for all theaters, and online ticket purchasing for all Clearview Cinemas and National Amusements theaters, among other smaller chains; such as Mann Theatres in Los Angeles. In 2010, MovieTickets.com sold over 16 million tickets for over 200 exhibitors, with 14,000 screens.

In 2001, Moviefone.com and Movietickets.com entered in a partnership in 2001 that crosslinked their ticketing offerings. In 2004, MovieTickets.com became the exclusive online ticket vendor for Moviefone.com. Then, in mid-2005, MovieTickets.com established a ticket distribution relationship with the consignment ticket reseller PrintTixUSA, adding 20 movie exhibition companies to its ranks and boosting the total number of screens serviced nationwide to more than 10,000. Since then, however, MovieTickets.com had lost ground, losing sole rights to the AMC chain and Moviefone's telephone arm to rival Fandango.

In April 2016, Movietickets.com reported it had provided advance ticketing services to 250 theater chains, representing over 50 percent of the top 100 grossing theaters in North America on any given weekend.

In October 2017, Fandango Media purchased MovieTickets.com. This purchase united the industry's two biggest online movie-ticketing services (Fandango's ticketing network spanned more than 33,000 screens worldwide; MovieTickets.com's over 29,000, with significant overlap between the two, e.g., both companies sold tickets to both AMC and Regal Cinemas) and increased Fandango's global screen count by approximately 20%, to over 40,000 screens worldwide.

== Competition with Fandango ==
Acquisitions and mergers of movie chains have complicated matters regarding which ticketing companies provide online ticketing for a particular theatre chain. MovieTickets.com lost the Hoyts theater chain when the latter was acquired by the Regal Cinemas theater chain, a founder of Movietickets.com's rival online ticketing agency Fandango; however, when Regal acquired Consolidated Theatres, the latter retained its contractual relationship with MovieTickets.com.

Prior to 2012, MovieTickets.com provided online ticketing for AMC Theatres except those cinemas originally part of the Loews Cineplex Entertainment chain, whose online ticketing is provided by Fandango due to contractual obligations in place prior to the 2005 merger of the two movie chains. In 2002, Loews had attempted to break the contract under pressure of bankruptcy and from (then) AOL Moviefone and its partner, Loews' Cineplex subsidiary; Fandango successfully sued both Loews and Moviefone, and retained the Loews business. Furthermore, as of February 8, 2012, Fandango began providing ticketing for non-Loews AMC Theatres in the US as well, after which MovieTickets.com's fellow shareholders sued AMC for breach of contract. AMC and MovieTickets.com settled in 2013, with an agreement that the theater chain's online ticketing would be available on both Fandango and MovieTickets.com.

In May 2012, MovieTickets.com's former partner Moviefone announced a new partnership with Fandango, when its relationship with MovieTickets.com lapsed.

In 2015, Regal Entertainment Group announced that they would begin to offer tickets on MovieTickets.com on a non-exclusive basis, as Regal tickets retained their availability on Fandango.

The competition ended with Fandango's purchase of MovieTickets.com in the 4th quarter of 2017.

== See also ==
- AMC Theatres
- Cineplex Entertainment
- Dealflicks
- Fandango.com
- Flixster
- Hollywood.com
- Internet Movie Database
- Marcus Theatres
- Moviefone
- National Amusements
- Regal Cinemas
