= Les Moonves =

American actor and television executive (born 1949)

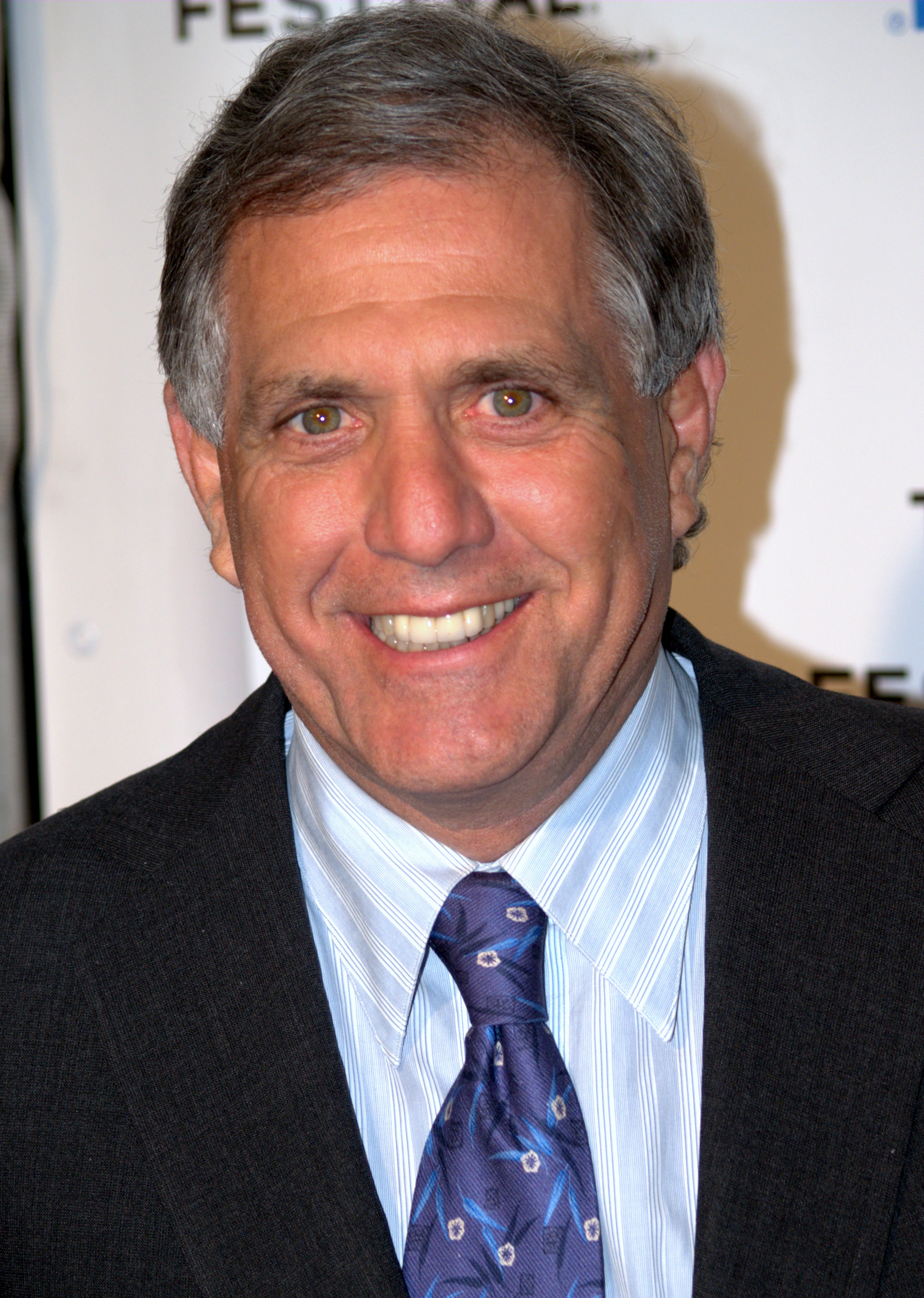
- Moonves in 2009
- Born: Leslie Roy Moonves; October 6, 1949 (age 77); New York City, US
- Education: Valley Stream Central High School
- Alma mater: Bucknell University (BA); Neighborhood Playhouse School of the Theatre
- Occupation: Media executive
- Employers: Lorimar Television/Warner Bros. Television (1985–1995); CBS (1995–2018)
- Spouses: Nancy Wiesenfeld (m. 1978; div. 2004); Julie Chen (m. 2004)
- Children: 4, including Sara

Leslie Roy Moonves (/ˈlɛs ˈmuːnvɛz/ LESS MOON-vess; born October 6, 1949) is an American retired media executive who was the chairman and CEO of CBS Corporation from 2006 until his resignation in September 2018 following numerous allegations of sexual harassment, sexual assault and abuse. He has been married to television personality Julie Chen since 2004.

He held a series of executive positions at CBS from July 1995 to September 2018. He was also on the board of directors at ZeniMax Media from 1999 until 2021. Later, he was co-president and co-chief operating officer (COO) of the original Viacom, the legal predecessor to CBS Corporation, from 2004 until the company split in December 2005. He became chairman of CBS in February 2016. In September 2018, Moonves stepped down as chairman of CBS after multiple women brought forth sexual assault allegations against him. Moonves allegedly destroyed evidence of his sexual misconduct.

According to various media reports, Moonves has amassed a net worth of over US$800 million through compensation from CBS. Moonves earned $68.4 million in 2017, combined with stock options of the media company, worth over $100 million.

== Early life ==
Leslie Roy Moonves was born in Brooklyn, New York City to a Jewish family, the son of Josephine (Schleifer) and Herman Moonves, and grew up in Valley Stream, New York. His mother was a nurse. He has one sister, Melissa Moonves Colon, and two brothers, including entertainment attorney Jonathan Moonves. He attended Valley Stream Central High School and went to Bucknell University, graduating in 1971. In his sophomore year, he decided that his science courses were unfulfilling and switched his major from pre-medical to the Spanish language (a subject he found vastly more enjoyable) and acted in a few plays; following graduation in 1971 he moved to Manhattan to pursue an acting career where he eventually graduated from the Neighborhood Playhouse School of the Theatre. He landed a few parts, playing tough guys on series such as Cannon and The Six Million Dollar Man, which he described as "forgettable" TV roles before deciding on the career change. He also worked as one of casting director Caro Jones' first office assistants early in her career.

== Business career ==
Moonves was in charge of first-run syndication and pay/cable programming at 20th Century Fox Television. Also at 20th Century Fox Television, he was vice president of movies and mini-series. Other positions included vice president of development at Saul Ilson Productions (in association with Columbia Pictures Television) and development executive for Catalina Productions.

=== Lorimar Television and Warner Bros. Television (1985–1995) ===
Moonves joined Lorimar Television in 1985 as executive in charge of its movies and mini-series, and in 1988, became head of creative affairs. From 1990 to 1993, he was president at Lorimar. In July 1993, he became president/CEO of Warner Bros. Television, when Warner Bros. and Lorimar Television combined operations. In this phase of his career, he green-lighted the shows Friends and ER, among many others.

=== CBS (1995–2018) ===
He joined CBS in July 1995 as President of CBS Entertainment. From April 1998 until 2003, he was president and chief executive officer at CBS, then was promoted to chairman and CEO of CBS in 2003. CBS had six of the ten most-watched primetime shows in the final quarter of 2005: CSI, Without a Trace, CSI: Miami, Survivor: Guatemala, NCIS, and Cold Case.

In February 2005, Moonves was identified as the executive directly responsible for ordering the cancellation of UPN's Star Trek: Enterprise and the ending of the 18-year revival of the Star Trek television franchise. In January 2006, Moonves helped make the deal that brought together the CBS-owned United Paramount Network (UPN) with The WB Television Network to form The CW Television Network that fall.

Moonves was the second most highly-paid executive for 2012 and 2013: he received $58.8 million and $65.4 million. He is considered the second-highest paid CEO, having been paid $68.4 million in 2017.

In 2013, Moonves was inducted into the Television Hall of Fame. He became chairman of CBS in February 2016.

Of the tone of the 2016 Republican presidential campaign, and the advertising dollars it delivered, Moonves said, "It may not be good for America, but it's damn good for CBS ... Man, who would have expected the ride we're all having right now? ... The money's rolling in and this is fun ... I've never seen anything like this, and this [is] going to be a very good year for us. Sorry. It's a terrible thing to say. But, bring it on, Donald. Keep going." He added, "Donald's place in this election is a good thing."

Moonves was also open to acquiring smaller film production companies to expand the company's CBS Films division. At the end of July 2017, Moonves was a part of a first-look television production deal between CBS and Imagine Entertainment, a feature film, television programming and documentary production company run by filmmaker Ron Howard and film producer Brian Grazer.

In September 2018, following allegations of sexual assault, it was reported that CBS was negotiating a $100 million exit package for Moonves and that CBS Chief Operating Officer Joe Ianniello would be his interim replacement. On September 9, 2018, CBS Corporation announced he had resigned and Joe Iannello would become interim CEO. Moonves and CBS will donate $20 million to the #MeToo movement, money that will be deducted from any severance benefits Moonves may be owed, the company said. The donation to charities promoting women's equality in the workplace would come upon the conclusion of an independent investigation into the allegations, according to the statement. In May 2021, Moonves dropped his claim for $120 million in severance pay, which reverted to ViacomCBS (the result of the 2019 merger of CBS Corporation and the second Viacom, later Paramount Global in 2022), and law firm Covington & Burling paid an undisclosed settlement fee to Moonves.

=== Janet Jackson ===
Following his firing from CBS due to sexual harassment, Moonves was revealed to have been obsessed with ruining R&B singer-songwriter Janet Jackson's career. His actions had followed the February 1, 2004, Super Bowl XXXVIII halftime show controversy, also known as Nipplegate. Jackson's right breast, adorned with a pierced nipple shield (a silver sun), had been exposed by former NSYNC member, vocalist Justin Timberlake, for 9/16ths of a second. The brief exposure became the most rewatched moment in the history of TiVo.

According to the documentary Malfunction: The Dressing Down of Janet Jackson, Moonves wanted an apology from both Jackson and Timberlake. Moonves deemed Jackson's apology as "insufficient" and implemented a blacklist of her music and music videos on MTV, VH1 and Infinity Broadcasting radio stations, all of which were owned by the original incarnation of Viacom at the time. MTV also had produced the halftime show, and it was permanently disallowed from producing future halftime shows as a consequence. Jackson had been scheduled to attend the 46th Annual Grammy Awards where she was to perform a tribute to Luther Vandross, after collaborating with him on the #1 single "The Best Things in Life Are Free", which was created for the soundtrack to the 1992 film Mo' Money. She, along with Timberlake, however, were disinvited from attending unless they released on-air apologies for the "Nipplegate" incident. Only Timberlake went to the ceremony after having approached Moonves in person at CBS's Los Angeles offices, where he tearfully apologized to him. The Vandross tribute was instead performed by Celine Dion, Alicia Keys and Richard Marx. CBS was fined $27,500 for the incident. In June 2006, that amount was later increased to $325,000 by the Federal Communications Commission. Moonves allegedly asked fellow CBS executives if the corporation could compel Jackson to pay the FCC fines following the investigation of the halftime show incident by Congress.

Moonves's anger at Jackson over the occurrence continued well into 2011, when Jackson signed a book deal with publisher Simon & Schuster, owned by CBS Corporation, for the self-help book True You: A Journey to Finding and Loving Yourself. "How the fuck did she slip through?," he reportedly inquired. Moonves also said, according to one source, that "...heads were going to roll," as a result of the settlement to which Jackson had agreed.

=== Howard Stern litigation ===
In February 2006, Moonves led CBS to file a $500 million lawsuit against Howard Stern for allegedly breaching his contract by failing to disclose the details of his deal with Sirius Satellite Radio while still employed by Infinity Broadcasting. Stern vowed to fight the suit, and said on his radio program that Moonves and CBS were trying to "bully" him and his agent, Don Buchwald. Stern later appeared on CBS's own Late Show with David Letterman, wearing a shirt mocking Moonves and his wife. In June 2006, Stern announced that the lawsuit had been settled. As part of the settlement, Sirius acquired the exclusive rights to all of the WXRK tapes (over two decades' worth of shows) for $2 million.

=== ZeniMax Media ===
Moonves was on the board of ZeniMax Media from its foundation in 1999 until 2021, alongside his friend and ZeniMax president Ernest Del. Moonves's personal investment in the company has been noted, as well as his appearances at several launch parties, including for Bethesda Softworks' Fallout 3, The Elder Scrolls V: Skyrim, and Rage.

=== Sexual assault allegations ===
Moonves voiced support for the #MeToo movement against sexual harassment in the workplace, even describing it as a "watershed moment" during a November 2017 press conference, and was a founding member of the Commission on Sexual Harassment and Advancing Equality in the Workplace, formed in late 2017 to "tackle the broad culture of abuse and power disparity". In January 2018, CBS Cares released public service announcements concerning how to combat sexual harassment.

In July 2018, The New Yorker published an article by Ronan Farrow saying that six women accused Moonves of harassment and intimidation, and dozens have described abuse at CBS. Moonves was subsequently placed under investigation by the CBS board. In August 2018, Bucknell University removed references to Moonves on its website, and University of Southern California suspended Moonves's name from its Media Center. In September 2018, The New Yorker reported that six more women (in addition to the six original women reported in July) had raised accusations against Moonves, going back to the 1980s. Shortly after resigning as CEO of CBS that month, Moonves released a statement denying all of the sexual misconduct allegations.

In November 2018, The New York Times published an article in which actress Bobbie Phillips alleged that Moonves sexually assaulted her during the mid-1990s, and was attempting to bury the allegations. The next month, it was revealed Moonves had been involved in paying a $9.5 million settlement to actress Eliza Dushku, who claimed she was written out of her starring role on CBS drama Bull as retaliation for reporting sexual harassment by co-star Michael Weatherly; actress Cybill Shepherd alleged in a radio interview that Moonves cancelled her sitcom, Cybill, after she rejected his advances.

On December 18, 2018, CBS announced that the board would deny Moonves his $120 million severance pay, as their investigation had found Moonves violated his contract. According to investigators, claims made by the women were credible and led to more claims that were found to be credible during the course of the investigation. In addition, it was claimed that Moonves attempted to interfere with the investigation. Examples of allegations include Moonves refusing to cooperate with investigators, acting "evasive and untruthful" towards investigators, deleting hundreds of messages, and passing off his son's iPad as his own to investigators.

On June 21, 2019, advice columnist E. Jean Carroll wrote in a first-person essay in New York that Moonves sexually assaulted her in an elevator in the mid-1990s after she interviewed him for a story. Moonves denied the allegation.

On May 14, 2021, CBS and Moonves agreed to settle their disputes over the latter's $120 million severance. A joint statement from Moonves and CBS explained that the $120 million would "revert" to CBS, that the cost of the settlement would be borne by CBS's law firm, and that Moonves would contribute the settlement money to various charities.

=== Moon Rise Unlimited ===
On February 8, 2019, The New York Times reported that Moonves had founded his own company in West Hollywood, California named Moon Rise Unlimited after being fired from CBS.

== Public appearances ==
On April 7, 2003, Moonves portrayed himself in an episode of The Practice. From early 2004 until its end in May 2015, Moonves made regular appearances on the Late Show with David Letterman. One of these came when Letterman declared outrage that CBS featured his late-night competitor Jay Leno in an ad for CBS's telecast of the People's Choice Awards. Letterman jokingly warned the "CBS stooge in the control room" to call his buddies "before things turn ugly"; Moonves obliged. Later appearances took the same format, with Letterman discussing current events and the CBS network with the company's CEO.

On the March 23, 2015, premiere episode of The Late Late Show with James Corden, Moonves portrayed himself as the head of CBS who sends out a golden ticket granting whoever finds it a chance to host The Late Late Show, in an homage to Charlie and the Chocolate Factory. Moonves also appeared on the September 8, 2015, premiere of The Late Show with Stephen Colbert, operating a large switch he could use to switch back to reruns of The Mentalist if he was unhappy with the new program.

== Personal life ==
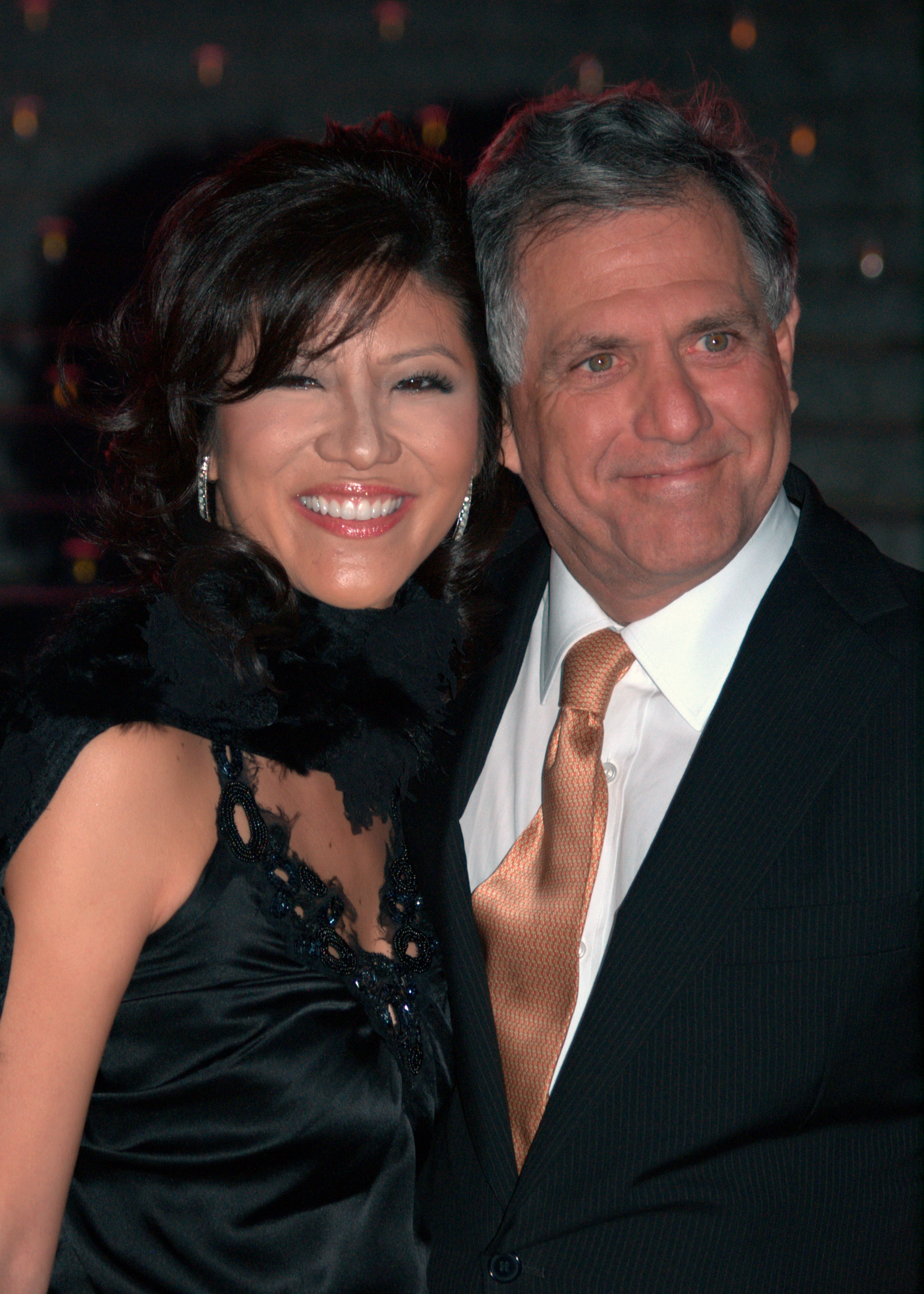
Moonves with his wife Julie Chen at the 2009 Tribeca Film Festival

Moonves is a grand-nephew of Paula Ben-Gurion, born Paula Munweis, wife of David Ben-Gurion, the first Prime Minister of Israel.

In 1978, Moonves married Nancy Wiesenfeld, with whom he has three children including W magazine editor in chief Sara Moonves. In April 2003, Nancy Moonves filed for divorce in Los Angeles Superior Court, citing irreconcilable differences. Nancy and Les Moonves were already living apart.

While still married to Nancy, Moonves began dating Julie Chen, CBS's The Early Show reporter and host of the reality series Big Brother and The Talk. On December 10, 2004, Moonves got a court to grant an early divorce, on a motion citing a "desire to return to the status of being single". Thirteen days later in Mexico, he married Chen. In 2009, Chen gave birth to a son.

Moonves resides in Beverly Hills, California, in a house he bought from Andy Heyward. He also owns residences in Malibu, California and New York City.

Moonves practices Transcendental Meditation, and has said, "It puts me in a calm state, which I'm not always in."

=== Philanthropy ===
In 2015, Moonves and Chen made a major donation to University of Southern California, resulting in a media center being named the Julie Chen/Leslie Moonves and CBS Media Center. Moonves was already a USC School of Cinematic Arts' board of councilors member. Previously Moonves was a University of Southern California's Annenberg School for Communication and Journalism board member.

In August 2018, Moonves was "suspended" from the USC School of Cinematic Arts' board of councilors in the wake of sex abuse allegations.

In September 2018, at the same time Moonves resigned, CBS announced that Moonves and the network would be donating $20 million to #MeToo-related organizations.

== See also ==
- Joseph Ianniello, former acting CEO at CBS
- Jim Lanzone, President and CEO of CBS Interactive
- Martha Minow, law professor and CBS board member
- Shari Redstone, vice-chairwoman of CBS and member of Redstone family which owned the majority share of CBS
- Sumner Redstone (1923–2020), former executive chairman of CBS and member of Redstone family which owned the majority share of CBS

Business positions
Preceded by Peter Tortorici	President of CBS; 1995–1998	Succeeded by Nancy Tellem
