= Philippe Dauman =

American businessman

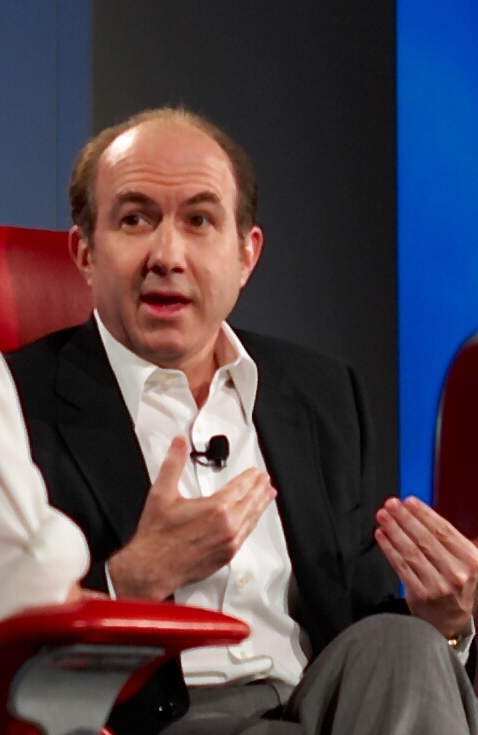
- Dauman in 2007
- Born: Philippe Pierre Dauman; March 1, 1954 (age 72); New York City, US
- Occupations: Former president, CEO and chairman of Viacom
- Spouse: Deborah Ross Dauman (m. 1977)

Philippe Pierre Dauman (born March 1, 1954) is an American businessman who was president, CEO and chairman of Viacom from September 2006 until May 20, 2016. Dauman was a longtime associate of the company's chairman Sumner Redstone. From 1994 to 2000, he was a member of Viacom's executive committee and executive vice president in charge of strategic transactions, legal and government affairs, human resources and administration, supervising Paramount Pictures Entertainment, Showtime Networks and Simon & Schuster. Dauman was also a director at Redstone-owned CBS Corporation until September 2006.

In February 2016, Viacom's board elected Dauman as Redstone's replacement as chairman.

== Early life and education ==
Dauman was born and raised in New York City. He is the son of Life magazine photographer Henri Dauman, a Holocaust survivor who emigrated from France to the United States in the 1950s. At 13, he got a perfect score on the SAT. At Yale University he fell in love with his roommate's sister, who would become his wife. Dauman married Deborah Ross in September 1977. Dauman graduated from Columbia University School of Law in 1978.

== Career ==
After graduating from Columbia, Dauman went to work for the law firm of Shearman & Sterling. After two years in the firm's Paris office, he returned to New York to work in the corporate group under partner Stephen Volk. Handling a routine Securities and Exchange Commission form 13D filing for Volk client Sumner Redstone in 1986 led to an advisory role in Redstone's 1987 hostile takeover of Viacom, a close personal relationship with Redstone, and a seat on Viacom's board of directors. Six years later, Dauman accepted an offer to join Viacom as senior vice president and general counsel, in exchange for $553,000 in salary with a $900,000 bonus. In 1994, he earned $2.3 million, plus options worth millions more. He was Viacom's general counsel from 1993 to 1998.

In 2009, Dauman and Viacom launched the Get Schooled education initiative with the Bill & Melinda Gates Foundation, an effort to have American public school students not drop out of school. He also hosted the Get Schooled education conference on September 8, 2009.

Dauman is a member of the Academy of Motion Picture Arts and Sciences and is president and treasurer of The Philippe and Deborah Dauman Family Foundation, which focuses on education and health. He formerly was a director of Lafarge, and on the board of directors of the KIPP Foundation, a national network of free, open-enrollment, college-preparatory public schools in underserved communities. He was a member of the Business Roundtable and was on the executive committee of the National Cable & Telecommunications Association, the board of trustees for The Paley Center for Media, the board of trustees of Northwell Health, the executive committee of the Lenox Hill Hospital and the board of trustees and dean's council of Columbia University School of Law.

Dauman took a tough stance on the reproduction of Viacom's content when Viacom sued YouTube in March 2007. Dauman discussed copyright issues with YouTube co-founder Chad Hurley and was interested in working out a deal. Dauman and Chad could not agree over advertising terms, however.

=== Legal issues ===
On May 20, 2016, Dauman and George S. Abrams were removed from the trust that will control Redstone's media empire. Dauman said in a statement: "These steps are invalid and illegal. As court proceedings and other facts have demonstrated, Sumner Redstone now lacks the capacity to have taken these steps. Sumner Redstone would never have summarily dismissed Philippe Dauman and George Abrams, his trusted friends and advisers for decades". The statement also said that Dauman and Abrams' removal is "...a shameful effort by Shari Redstone to seize control by unlawfully using her ailing father Sumner Redstone’s name and signature." Dauman filed suit against Shari Redstone in an effort to keep his position on the Trust. The suit was settled and Dauman stepped down in August, 2016.

== Personal life ==
In 1977, Dauman married Deborah Ross, in an Episcopalian church. They have two children, Philippe, Jr., and Alexandre.
