= National Amusements =

Merged American movie theater chain (1936–2025)

National Amusements, Inc.
- Final logo, used from 2000 to 2025
- Formerly: Northeast Theater Corporation (1936–1959)
- Type: Private
- Industry: Entertainment
- Founded: 1936; 90 years ago in Dedham, Massachusetts, U.S.
- Founder: Michael Redstone
- Defunct: August 7, 2025; 15 months ago
- Fate: Acquired by Skydance Media and reincorporated as Harbor Lights Entertainment, Inc.
- Successor: Harbor Lights Entertainment
- Headquarters: 846 University Avenue, Norwood, Massachusetts, U.S.
- Key people: Shari Redstone (chairwoman, president and CEO)
- Products: Movie theaters
- Owner: Redstone family
- Number of employees: 23,900 (2017)
- Divisions: Showcase Cinemas
- Subsidiaries: Paramount Global (9.76% of total shares and 77.4% of total voting power); UCI Cinemas (Brazil)

National Amusements, Inc. was an American privately owned movie theater operator and mass media holding company incorporated in Maryland and based in Norwood, Massachusetts, controlled by the Redstone family. The company owned 69 theaters and 667 screens throughout the United States, the United Kingdom, and Latin America under several brands, such as Showcase Cinemas, Multiplex Cinemas, and Cinema de Lux. It was the controlling shareholder of Paramount Global.

National Amusements was founded by Michael Redstone, and later passed to his son Sumner Redstone. After his death on August 11, 2020, the company was passed to a trust led by his daughter Shari Redstone. After nearly 90 years of control by the Redstone family, in July 2024, David Ellison's Skydance Media announced its intent to acquire National Amusements and perform a merger between Skydance Media and Paramount Global to form Paramount Skydance. The Federal Communications Commission (FCC) approved the merger of Skydance Media and Paramount Global on July 24, 2025, with the merger closing on August 7, 2025.

== History ==
The company was founded by Michael Redstone in 1936 in the Boston suburb of Dedham as Northeast Theater Corporation, operating a chain of movie theaters in the region. In 1959, when the founder's son Sumner Redstone joined the company, it was renamed National Amusements, the present name.

On June 10, 1987, the company became the majority owner of the original incarnation of Viacom, a former CBS subsidiary syndicating television programs to stations around the United States. Since the buyout, Viacom continued to expand through purchases from the early 1990s to the early 2000s, announcing plans to merge with Paramount Communications (formerly Gulf+Western), parent of Paramount Pictures, in 1993 (which closed in 1994), buying the Blockbuster Video chain in 1994, merging with the original CBS Corporation in 2000, and acquiring BET Holdings (which became BET Media Group) in 2001.

In March 2005, due to Viacom's declining stock price, National Amusements announced that it would split its media subsidiary into two companies that would remain under its control, which was completed on December 31. The original Viacom became the second CBS Corporation as it kept CBS, Simon & Schuster, and Paramount Network Television (now CBS Studios), among other assets, while MTV Networks, BET Media Group, and Paramount Pictures were spun-off to a sister company under the Viacom name. The second iterations of Viacom and CBS Corporation commenced trading on January 3, 2006.

At the end of 2008, due to financial troubles, owners Sumner Redstone and Shari Redstone sold $400 million of nonvoting shares in National Amusements. In October 2009, the company sold almost $1 billion of its interest in the stock of CBS and Viacom and sold 35 theaters to Rave Motion Pictures. Today these theatres are owned by Cinemark, AMC, Alamo, or have closed. National Amusements now almost exclusively operates theaters in the Northeastern United States (with the exception of one location in Ohio). The following year, National Amusements planned to sell $390 million of notes to refinance a large part of the company's bank owed debt.

In 2019, it was announced that the multinational media conglomerates controlled by National Amusements — Viacom and CBS Corporation — would re-merge to form a new company named ViacomCBS. Viacom and CBS announced that the merger would close on December 4; following the official close, the company began trading on the NASDAQ the following day. In 2022, the company was renamed Paramount Global.

Sumner Redstone, who was National Amusements' chairman, CEO and owner, died on August 11, 2020. His holdings were transferred to a trust led by his daughter Shari Redstone.

In January 2024, it was reported that film producer David Ellison was interested in buying National Amusements from the Redstones. If the acquisition would be closed, the company would be placed under Ellison's Skydance Media. On July 2, it was reported that Skydance had reached a preliminary agreement, and that it had been referred to a special committee of Paramount's board for approval. On July 7, Skydance officially announced its intent to acquire Paramount Global, under a process in which Skydance will acquire National Amusements for $2.4 billion, pay Paramount's Class A and Class B stockholders $4.5 billion in cash and shares, and then perform an all-stock merger between Paramount and Skydance.

As part of the merger of Skydance Media and Paramount Global, National Amusements was acquired by the Ellison family and Gerry Cardinale of RedBird Capital Partners and eventually reincorporated as Harbor Lights Entertainment, Inc. On August 7, 2025, following the closure of the merger, Paramount Skydance president Jeff Shell announced that they were exploring a sale of the National Amusements assets. On June 11, 2026, Harbor Lights announced it would sell Showcase Cinemas to Belgian-based theater operator Kinepolis. The deal was closed on September 11, 2026, with Kinepolis continuing to use the Showcase Cinemas brand name. On August 25, 2026, Brazilian entertainment website Omelete reported that Harbor Lights had sold UCI Cinemas Brazil to a joint venture between Cine Araújo and Grupo Vila Rica.

== Operations ==
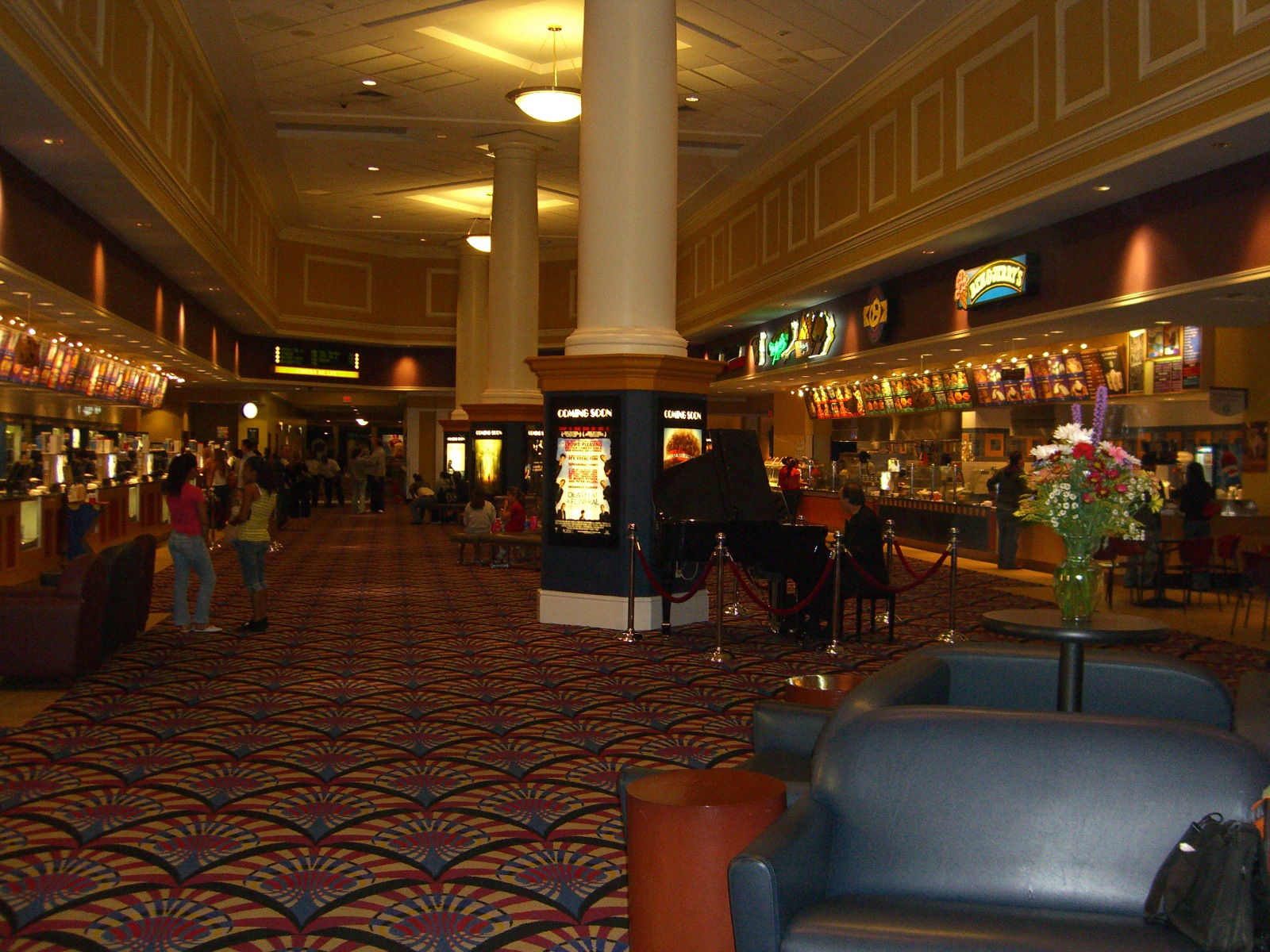
City Center 15 Cinema de Lux in White Plains, New York, in 2007. The lobby includes a waiting area with a television, newspaper rack and sofas (left), a piano (right of center), and a restaurant (not pictured).

The company operated more than 650 movie screens across the Northeastern United States, the United Kingdom, and Latin America under its Showcase Cinemas, Showcase Cinema de Lux, Multiplex Cinemas, and Cinema de Lux. In Canada, National Amusements, through its 1994 acquisition of Viacom, also owned Famous Players; individual cinemas from the now-defunct chain are now owned by Cineplex Entertainment and Landmark Cinemas. In 2004, National Amusements acquired the Brazilian operations of cinema chain UCI, and revamped them so they could be more in line with their Showcase chain. They also share some of the corporate identities of Showcase and have XPlus & De Lux rooms in selected cinemas, as well as fully reclining seats.

National Amusements owned a 9.7% equity stake and 79.9% voting interest in Paramount Global, and used to operate its predecessors, the second CBS Corporation and the second Viacom before their closure in 2019, both split from the also defunct first Viacom. The company may hold an unspecified stake in Audacy, Inc., as part of the reverse Morris trust that spun CBS's radio assets off to that company; CBS Corporation shareholders overall held a 72% stake in the then-named Entercom as of the spin-off.
