= 2025 notable events in American television =

The following is a list of notable events in American television in 2025.

== January ==
Date	Event	Ref.
1	MSG Network and its sister networks are removed from Optimum cable systems due to an unresolved carriage dispute between the networks and Optimum owner Altice USA. It is the first carriage dispute between the two parties since Altice purchased Optimum from MSG's parent company Cablevision in 2016.	
1	Reruns of Family Guy returned to Adult Swim for the first time since 2021 after striking a non-exclusive deal for the rights to older episodes. Adult Swim parent Warner Bros. Discovery's license to broadcast the program expired after The Walt Disney Company acquired the series' production company, 20th Television, as part of its 2019 purchase of most 21st Century Fox assets, with FXX and Freeform holding exclusive cable rights. The Cartoon Network programming block first aired reruns of the Fox animated series in 2003 (consisting initially of the original 1999–2002 run), and played a role in its revival, which has aired since 2005. (Adult Swim previously aired new episodes of Family Guy on a next-day basis in a TV-MA recut including crude material cut or censored from the Fox airings to comply with broadcast standards.) Reruns returned to Adult Swim with a three-day marathon, before airing in a regular weekday primetime slot on January 4.	
5	The 82nd Golden Globe Awards airs on CBS and streams on Paramount+. Nikki Glaser hosts the ceremony, with notable winners including Best Motion Pictures Emilia Pérez (Musical or Comedy and Foreign Language), among its four wins out of ten nominations overall) and The Brutalist (Drama, among its three wins) and television series Shōgun (Best Drama Series, among its four wins), Hacks (Best Musical or Comedy Series, among two wins), and Baby Reindeer (Best Limited Series, Anthology, or Film, among its two wins).	
6	FuboTV agrees to sell a 70% majority stake in its vMVPD business to The Walt Disney Company and merge with Disney's Hulu + Live TV business. The merged company will be led by Fubo's executive team and remain publicly traded, but with Disney holding majority control of its board. Both the Fubo and Hulu + Live TV services will continue to operate under their respective brands, with Fubo being responsible for carriage negotiations. The deal excludes the Hulu video on-demand service, which will continue to be exclusively held by Disney. As part of the agreement, Fubo settles its antitrust lawsuit with Venu Sports, the proposed sports-focused streaming service joint venture between Disney, Fox Corporation, and Warner Bros. Discovery, with the consortium planning to make a one-time payment of $220 million. (The Venu consortium later announced on January 10 that the service would not launch; DirecTV and Dish Network asked the New York district court to reconsider the case's dismissal on grounds that the antitrust issues remained unanswered and they could still be harmed by Venu's competition.) Fubo also reaches a carriage agreement for Disney's suite of channels. The merger is expected to be completed between 12 and 18 months, pending regulatory approval.	
8	Following the Southern California wildfires that began on January 7, CBS pulls a scheduled repeat of Fire Country for January 10 and replaces it with a repeat of NCIS: Sydney, while NBC still airs Chicago Fire as planned for January 8 alongside Chicago P.D. and Chicago Med.	
8	In Part 1 of a two-part crossover event, characters from FXX's It's Always Sunny in Philadelphia volunteer at the titular school of ABC's Abbott Elementary. The second part premieres on July 9, as part of Sunny's 17th season.	
9	Major American networks cover the state funeral of Jimmy Carter, who died on December 29, 2024, at age 100.	
10	Nexstar Media Group removes its local stations and national networks, including NewsNation and multiple CW stations, from Optimum systems due to a carriage dispute.	
13	MSNBC announces it would temporarily expand The Rachel Maddow Show (which has regularly aired in the 9 p.m. ET slot on Monday nights only since 2022) to a five-night-a-week schedule through April 27 to cover the first 100 days of Donald Trump's second presidency, while Alex Wagner, who regularly hosts Alex Wagner Tonight in the slot Tuesday-Friday, would be placed on special assignments to report on the effects of Trump's policy decisions across the country and internationally. Both Maddow's and Wagner's primetime shows returns to their regular schedules starting on April 30.	
16	In one of her last acts as FCC chair before the second Trump administration, Jessica Rosenworcel orders the rejection of three complaints and one petition against local TV stations. The affected complaints, filed by a conservative-leaning group, targeted network-owned stations in Philadelphia and New York City over perceived coverage and equal-time presentations of Kamala Harris' 2024 presidential campaign; the petition, from a pro-democracy centrist group, sought to revoke the license of WTXF/Philadelphia following station parent Fox Corporation's defamation lawsuit regarding statements made on Fox News about 2020 presidential election. Rosenworcel's successor as FCC chair, Brendan Carr, would reinstate the complaints, though not the challenge against WTXF (which the second group would later appeal), on January 22.	
16	LIV Golf announces a new deal with Fox Sports to air tournament coverage on Fox, FS1, FS2, and Fox Business; the broadcasts, which the league will continue to produce in-house, had aired on The CW since 2023.	
18	Allen Media Group announces plans to begin a centralized weather forecasting, originating from the company's Atlanta-based The Weather Channel, for its local station group. AMG trumpets the move (which would ostensibly eliminate all local meteorologist positions, though some affected would be offered positions at TWC) as a way to efficiently improve the stations' weather coverage capabilities. The plan, however, comes amidst cost-cutting measures at AMG (which has included eliminations in employees and consolidations and cuts to local newscasts), and also receives criticism over the perceived loss of community engagement that local weather reports provide. Although development of the Atlanta-based regional production hub would continue, AMG notified at least six of the group's stations on January 23 that their locally based meteorologists would be retained. The TWC hub concept would quietly be implemented at a few other stations (such as WSIL/Harrisburg, Illinois and WTHI/Terre Haute) by late March.	
20	Major American networks cover the second inauguration of Donald Trump as the 47th President of the United States. The inauguration was watched by 26.05 million viewers across all major broadcast and cable news networks, down from the two previous inauguration ceremonies: Joe Biden's 2021 ceremony received 39.87 million viewers and Trump's first inauguration in 2017 was viewed by 38.3 million. Fox News (which had the highest inauguration ratings among all networks, averaging 10.3 million viewers) was the only major news network to see an increase in viewership over Biden's 2021 inauguration.	
21	WDJT/Milwaukee fires weekend meteorologist Sam Kuffel, after she criticized Elon Musk for a controversial arm gesture made during his speech at Donald Trump's inauguration the day prior on her personal and private Instagram account with profanity denouncing the gesture. Kuffel's dismissal by the Weigel Broadcasting-owned CBS affiliate came after her posts were pointed out to and publicized by local conservative talk show host Dan O'Donnell of WISN radio to pressure Weigel to terminate Kuffel for offering a political opinion as a station employee.	
28	Rather than reportedly take a late-night slot as part of a reshuffling of CNN's daytime lineup, Jim Acosta announces he would instead be departing the network, where he has spent 18 years as a reporter (in particular chief White House correspondent) and as one of the hosts of CNN Newsroom. The proposal to move Acosta to a lower-rated timeslot was seen by critics as attempt to appease President Donald Trump, who had repeatedly sparred with CNN and Acosta over their reporting of him dating to his first administration (including White House press staff briefly suspending Acosta's press pass in 2018, which a federal judge ruled had violated the then-correspondent's due-process rights).	
30	The FCC launches an investigation into PBS and NPR concerning whether corporate underwriting spots during their programs "cross the line" into traditional advertising. Federal guidelines, which both broadcasters' CEOs state they are in compliance, require that the spots cannot advocate a "call to action" directly promoting for-profit goods and services. The inquiry was seen as a step toward eliminating federal funding for public broadcasting, long supported by conservatives and endorsed by FCC Chairman Brendan Carr, and, coupled with Carr's earlier revival of complaints regarding coverage of the 2024 election, as a broader attempt to use federal authority to coerce media coverage more favorable to the Trump administration.	(Note: The FCC does not directly regulate PBS and NPR, but conducts oversight of local and statewide public broadcasting stations under the agency's authority to grant and review broadcast licenses. Carr authored the FCC section of Project 2025, which also seeks to erode the agency's independence from political influence by the executive branch.)
31	Chuck Todd announces that he left NBC News after 18 years, a tenure that included moderating Meet the Press from 2014 to 2023. His departure came less than two weeks into the second presidency of Donald Trump, where Trump had criticized Todd, who was at times critical in his coverages of him. Todd has also criticized NBC News on air, following their 2024 hiring of former Republican National Committee chair Ronna McDaniel, saying she had deep creditibility issues.	

== February ==
Date	Event	Ref.
2	The 67th Annual Grammy Awards airs on CBS and streams on Paramount+ from Crypto.com Arena in Los Angeles. Notable winners include Kendrick Lamar (whose single, "Not Like Us", swept its five categories, including Record of the Year and Song of the Year, making it the most awarded song in Grammy history), Beyoncé (with three awards, tied with Charli XCX, St. Vincent and Gabriela Ortiz, including Album of the Year and Best Country Album, the latter being the first win by a Black artist, for Cowboy Carter), and Chappell Roan (who won Best New Artist).	
4	Ending a six-year-long carriage dispute, Comcast and regional sports network Altitude announce a carriage agreement that adds the Denver-based Altitude, the television home of the NHL's Colorado Avalanche and NBA's Denver Nuggets, to a higher-priced "sports and entertainment" tier on Comcast's Xfinity cable systems in the Rocky Mountain region.	
7	Netflix announces its cancellation of a planned six-part documentary about the life and career of Prince, and will instead work with Prince's estate on a new documentary. The terminated project, which was produced by Ezra Edelman, had been in limbo due to disapproval from the estate for use of Prince's material, reportedly over the film's depiction of his personal life that included, according to a September 2024 New York Times report, accusations that he committed physical and emotional abuse.	
7	The 30th Critics' Choice Awards airs on E! from the Barker Hangar in Santa Monica, California. Chelsea Handler hosts the ceremony, which was originally scheduled for January 12 but was postponed twice due to the wildfires in Southern California. Notable winners include films Anora (the first film to win Best Picture without winning in any other categories), Emilia Pérez, The Substance and Wicked (with all three films respectively getting three wins each) and television programs Shōgun (with four wins, including Best Drama Series) and Hacks (with two wins, Best Comedy Series and Jean Smart for Best Actress in a Comedy Series).	
9	In a telecast that includes tributes from some of his current and former broadcast partners, Hubie Brown calls his final NBA game for ABC (a 135–127 win by the Milwaukee Bucks over the Philadelphia 76ers at Fiserv Forum), retiring after over a half-century as a pro basketball coach and TV analyst (he worked with ESPN/ABC, TNT, CBS, and USA Network in the latter role).	
9	Super Bowl LIX, from the Caesars Superdome in New Orleans, airs on Fox, Fox Deportes (Spanish language coverage), and Fox Corporation's free-streaming service Tubi. Despite its lopsided outcome (a 40–22 win by the Philadelphia Eagles over the Kansas City Chiefs), the game attracts an estimated 126 million viewers across Fox's platforms, a new viewership record that surpasses the 123.4 million viewers who watched Super Bowl LVIII one year earlier; the halftime show featuring Kendrick Lamar subsequently became the most-watched halftime show as well, surpassing Michael Jackson's 1993 halftime show.	
9	During the Super Bowl LIX telecast, Fox-owned stations in Los Angeles, Philadelphia and Atlanta, as well as a Nexstar-owned Fox affiliate in St. Louis, air a commercial featuring Kanye West in a dentist's chair promoting the website for his fashion brand Yeezy. Hours after the ad aired, merchandise on Yeezy.com was swapped out to show just one item, a T-shirt with a Nazi Party swastika. The site and the ad receive widespread condemnation in light of West's history of antisemitic statements on social media. Yeezy.com was taken down by its host, Shopify, on February 11, and Fox Television Stations offered a statement of regret to its employees on February 12.	(Note: The ad time was purchased, and its subject matter did not generate any controversy, before West's more-recent comments earlier that month and the site's change in content.)
20	ESPN announces that it would withdraw the final three years of its current national broadcast deal with the Major League Baseball at the end of the 2025 season. ESPN has been broadcasting MLB games since 1990, with its current coverage (previously consisting of multiple nights a week) consisting mostly of Sunday Night Baseball. ESPN had requested a corresponding reduction in rights fees (totaling $550 million annually under the existing deal) for the reduced package, which MLB rejected.	
22	The 56th NAACP Image Awards airs on BET, CBS, and their sister networks from the Pasadena Convention Center. Notable winners include films The Six Triple Eight (with three wins, including Outstanding Motion Picture and Kerry Washington for Outstanding Actress in a Motion Picture) and The Piano Lesson (with two wins), and television programs Abbott Elementary, Cross and Poppa's House (with two wins each). Special honors were given to Dave Chappelle (President's Award), former Vice President Kamala Harris (Chairman's Award), the Wayans family (Hall of Fame Award) and Keke Palmer (Entertainer of the Year).	
23	The 31st Annual Screen Actors Guild Awards streams live on Netflix; Kristen Bell hosted the ceremony. Notable winners include film nominees Timothée Chalamet (Outstanding Lead Male Actor for A Complete Unknown) and Demi Moore (Outstanding Lead Female Actor for The Substance), and television nominees Shōgun (with four wins, including Hiroyuki Sanada and Anna Sawai, respectively, for Outstanding Male and Female Actor in a Drama Series), Only Murders in the Building (Outstanding Ensemble Performance in a Comedy Series) and Colin Farrell (Outstanding Male Actor in a TV Movie or Limited Series for The Penguin). Jane Fonda was honored with a Life Achievement Award.	
24	MSNBC confirms it would reshuffle its weeknight lineup, expanding Jen Psaki's role to the Tuesday-Friday mid-evening timeslot that Alex Wagner left behind in January (with Wagner remaining with the network as a political analyst), and the cancellation of Joy Reid's TheReidOut in favor of a panel show hosted by weekend hosts Symone Sanders-Townsend, Michael Steele, and Alicia Menendez. They are the first major scheduling moves made by MSNBC's new president, Rebecca Kutler, who was appointed to the role on February 12.	
24	Beyond the Gates premieres on CBS, becoming the first daytime soap opera to premiere on broadcast television since 1999 (NBC's Passions), as well as the first soap to primarily feature an African American cast since 1989 (Generations, also on NBC).	

== March ==
Date	Event	Ref.
2	The 97th Academy Awards airs on ABC from the Dolby Theatre in Los Angeles, with Conan O'Brien hosting the ceremony and major winners including Anora with five Oscars (including Best Picture, Best Actress Mikey Madison, and Best Director, Film Editing, and Original Screenplay awards to Sean Baker). The ceremony is also streamed on Hulu for the first time; however, the streaming service's live feed encountered several technical glitches and crashed multiple times throughout the ceremony, and ended abruptly before the Best Actress and Best Picture winners were revealed.	
3	Major League Baseball announces an dissolution of a two-decade-old conflict between the Washington Nationals and Baltimore Orioles that saw the Orioles, through their MASN sports network, involuntarily control the television rights for the Nationals since their 2005 relocation from Montreal to the American capital, which had long been part of the home territory for the Orioles. Both teams share ownership in MASN, with Baltimore holding the controlling interest in the network. The deal, which resolves legal struggles between the two teams, will see Nationals games remain on MASN through the end of their 2025 season, after which they will, for the first time, be free to control their own destiny for their game rights, and comes two years after the death of Nationals owner Ted Lerner, allowing his son Mark to put his imprint on the franchise and guide the team forward.	
3	Jimmy Johnson announces his retirement from Fox Sports. Johnson, previously a football coach at both the collegiate level (most notably with the Miami Hurricanes) and the NFL (with the Dallas Cowboys), joined Fox NFL Sunday as a studio analyst when the network launched its sports division in 1994 and outside a four-year hiatus in the late 1990s when he was the head coach of the Miami Dolphins, remained with Fox through Super Bowl LIX in February, with a tribute to Johnson airing as part of pre-game coverage.	
10	A rain-wrapped EF2 tornado hits the Lake Mary studios of WOFL (Fox) and WRBW (MyNetworkTV) during the Fox-owned Orlando stations' morning coverage of the storm. The tornado, which was captured live by a WOFL tower camera as it crossed I-4 near the facility, and also destroyed at least one home and damaged several others in Lake Mary and Longwood, damaged an outdoor set used for weather segments and several employee vehicles in the building's parking lot, and snapped several trees and tree branches on the studio grounds.	
12	The Association of Volleyball Professionals (AVP) announces a television deal with CBS Sports and The CW beginning in May that would see the beach volleyball tour's matches airing Friday nights on CBS Sports Network and Saturday nights on The CW from Memorial Day weekend until Labor Day weekend, when the AVP's season-ending championship will have a Sunday afternoon airing on CBS.	
12	The International Olympic Committee announces a $3 billion contract extension with NBC Sports to continue broadcasting the Olympics through the 2036 Summer games. NBC's previous contract was set to expire at the end of the 2032 Summer Olympics. Overall, NBC Sports has held the American broadcasting rights to the Summer Olympic Games since the 1988 games and the rights to the Winter Olympic Games since the 2002 games.	
17	The 2025 iHeartRadio Music Awards airs on Fox from the Dolby Theatre in Hollywood.	
26	ESPN announces it would move production on its 1AM (ET) editions of SportsCenter from its Los Angeles studios back to its Bristol, Connecticut headquarters, a move that also affects the network's soccer studio coverage. ESPN began L.A. editions of SportsCenter in 2009, with the last airing in May, after which the L.A. hub would continue to house NBA studio coverage and other content.	

== April ==
Date	Event	Ref.
2	In an exclusive mega-deal with producing studio 20th Television Animation, Fox announces a four-season, 15-episode renewal for The Simpsons, Bob's Burgers, and Family Guy, along with American Dad!, marking its return to the network after an 11-year run on TBS, when it moved from Fox in 2014. In addition the renewals and their broadcast run, The Simpsons and Family Guy also continue to produce exclusive episodes for Disney+ and Hulu, respectively.	
19–20	WrestleMania 41 is held at Allegiant Stadium in Las Vegas, Nevada and is streamed on Peacock and airs on pay-per-view.	
22	Saying he has lost his ability to make independent journalistic decisions for the show, Bill Owens announces he would resign as executive producer of CBS News' 60 Minutes. Owens had been with CBS for 37 years, and was only the third EP in 60 Minutes' 57-year history (after Don Hewitt and Jeff Fager). His departure comes at a time when CBS parent Paramount Global faces a lawsuit by President Donald Trump over the show's October 2024 interview with Kamala Harris, and as it seeks FCC approval to complete its merger with Skydance Media.	

== May ==
Date	Event	Ref.
8	The 60th Academy of Country Music Awards streams live on Prime Video from Ford Center at The Star, with Reba McEntire as host.	
14	The National Hockey League's Tampa Bay Lightning announce a rights deal with Scripps Sports that would see non-national Lightning telecasts, beginning with the 2025–26 NHL season, air on Scripps-owned WXPX-TV/Bradenton-Tampa and through a direct-to-consumer streaming option. The deal ends a 33-year relationship between the Lightning and regional channel FanDuel Sports Network Sun, and it makes the Lightning the seventh U.S.-based NHL team to eschew the local cable model in favor of a broadcast or DTC streaming approach (the fourth involving Scripps Sports).	
16	Cable television companies Charter Communications and Cox Communications announce an agreement to merge in a $34.5 billion deal. Following regulatory approval, the deal would close in August 2026, resulting in a company that would eventually adopt the Cox Communications corporate name as well as Charter's Spectrum brand for its customer-facing cable/internet operations.	
19	Indicating tensions with corporate leadership similar to those Bill Owens expressed when he departed from 60 Minutes (see 4/22 entry), Wendy McMahon announces she would resign as president/CEO of CBS News and Stations.	
19	Sesame Workshop announces a deal with Netflix to stream new episodes of Sesame Street, starting with its 56th season. The move comes after Warner Bros. Discovery opted not to renew its contract with Sesame Workshop after Sesame Street's 55th season; the show had aired exclusively on PBS until 2016, when then-WarnerMedia-owned HBO, prior to its 2022 merger with Discovery, Inc., gained rights to episode premieres, which moved to HBO Max in 2020. Under the WBD agreement, PBS could only air Sesame Street episodes several months after HBO or Max premiered them first; under the Netflix deal, however, the streamer releases each episode the same day it premieres on PBS or PBS Kids. PBS and its public broadcasting predecessor NET has carried Sesame Street in some form since the program's 1969 premiere. Under a separate agreement, reruns of archival Sesame Street episodes will be available through YouTube.	
21	Deborah Norville makes her final appearance as anchor of Inside Edition, having hosted the syndicated tabloid television program since March 1995; she would move to the game show The Perfect Line, which premiered in the fall.	
26	The 51st American Music Awards, hosted by Jennifer Lopez, are held in Las Vegas, the first AMA ceremony to air on CBS after having aired on ABC since its inception in 1974.	
28	President Donald Trump signs pardons for reality television stars Julie and Todd Chrisley. The Chrisleys, who with their family are known for the USA Network series Chrisley Knows Best, were convicted and sentenced in 2022 for bank fraud and tax evasion; their pardons came after their daughter Savannah Chrisley, a vocal Trump supporter, lobbied the president for their release.	
30	Lester Holt signs off as anchor of NBC Nightly News. Holt, who announced his departure from the role on February 24, but will remain with NBC News as host of Dateline, joined the weekend edition of Nightly in 2007, and moved to the weeknight edition in 2015, after predecessor Brian Williams resigned. Tom Llamas, anchor of NBC News Now's Top Story, succeeds Holt as Nightly anchor on June 2.	
31	Game 6 of the NBA's Eastern Conference Finals (a 125–108 win by the Indiana Pacers over the New York Knicks) airs on TNT. It is the last NBA game to air on the network, ending a 41-year relationship between the league and TNT Sports that dates back to the original NBA on TBS in 1984 (the games would move to TNT in 1989). TNT Sports' league broadcast rights were not renewed and these games moved to NBC and Amazon starting in the 2025–26 season. Despite this, TNT continues to produce the studio show Inside the NBA for incumbent rightsholders ESPN and ABC.	

== June ==
Date	Event	Ref.
7	The second-to-last staging of Good Night and Good Luck at New York's Winter Garden Theatre (featuring George Clooney as Edward R. Murrow) airs on CNN, becoming the first live television simulcast of a Broadway show.	
8	The 78th Tony Awards air on CBS from New York's Radio City Music Hall, with Cynthia Erivo as host and notable winners including Maybe Happy Ending (six wins including Best Musical) and Purpose (Best Play).	
8	The studios of KTXS/Abilene, Texas are significantly damaged after severe thunderstorm winds producing gusts up to 80 mph (130 km/h) collapsed a section of the building, an on-site garage (which fell onto an ENG vehicle) and its studio transmitter link tower; peeled off a section of the studio roof; and damaged several windows. Flooding also occurred inside the Sinclair-owned ABC affiliate's studio from heavy rains that poured into the damaged areas. No station employees on-site during the storm were injured.	
8–9	Two incidents involving television journalists occur at scenes of Los Angeles protests over illegal immigration raids: On June 8, Lauren Tomasi, a correspondent for Australia's Nine News, is hit at close range by a rubber bullet from an LAPD officer's gun while wrapping a live stand-up report (Nine News notes that while Tomasi was "left sore" by the bullet, she and her camera operator were "otherwise unharmed"). On June 9, CNN reporter Jason Carroll is briefly detained on-the-air by LAPD officers, with the network later stating that two camera operators were arrested outright.	
9	Warner Bros. Discovery announces plans to split into two separate, publicly traded companies: The tentatively-named "WBD Global Networks" (later billed as Discovery Global) will take cable channels including CNN, TBS, TNT, Cartoon Network and Discovery, while "WBD Streaming & Studios" (later billed as Warner Bros.) will take the HBO premium channels, streaming service HBO Max, and the Warner Bros. film and television studios. The split is projected to be completed by mid-2026.	
9	The 25th BET Awards air on BET from Los Angeles' Peacock Theater.	
10	Two days after ABC News suspends White House correspondent Terry Moran after his overnight post (which was later deleted) on X that called Trump administration adviser Stephen Mlller a "world-class hater", the network announces it will not renew Moran's contract.	
12	The series finale of After Midnight airs on CBS, with the network discontinuing producing original programming in the 12:30 a.m (ET) time slot that follows The Late Show. After Midnight had aired since January 2024 and was initially renewed for a third season, but after host Taylor Tomlinson announced plans in March to leave the program to focus on her stand-up comedy work and other projects, CBS chose to cancel the show rather than to find a new host to replace her (Tomlinson said she wanted CBS to do the latter). CBS has aired content in the 12:30 a.m slot since The CBS Late Movie in the 1970s, most prominently carrying The Late Late Show between 1995 and 2023. Starting in September, the timeslot carries new episodes and reruns of Byron Allen's Comics Unleashed, as it did between the end of the Late Late Show and the launch of After Midnight.	
13	McDonald's announces a settlement in a $10 billion lawsuit that Allen Media Group-owned Entertainment Studios filed against them and was set to go to trial in federal court in July. Entertainment Studios alleged in the suit (which was originally filed in 2021) that the fast-food giant discriminated against Black-owned media companies in its television advertising (AMG is headed by comedian Byron Allen). Settlement terms are not disclosed outside the restaurant continuing to purchase advertising on AMG networks and stations at fair market value.	
23	The Pac-12 Conference announces a 5-year media deal with CBS Sports, beginning with the 2026–27 academic year, that will see CBS and Paramount+ carry a minimum 3 regular season football and men's basketball games, along with the conference championship games in those sports, each year during the deal. The Pac-12, rebuilding after all of its full-membership schools except Oregon State and Washington State went to other conferences after the 2023–24 season, has relied on stopgap television deals with other networks, most notably The CW, during 2024–25. The Pac-12 would later announce two other deals, on August 27 with CW Sports and November 13 with USA Sports, that will also commence in 2026-27, when the conference will add six new member schools.	
25	DirecTV announces it will, in some regions of the U.S., discontinue sales of satellite television subscriptions to new customers and offer a streaming package instead.	
26	The Walt Disney Company and Charter Communications announce an agreement that will give subscribers to Charter's Spectrum Select package access to ad-supported versions of Disney's Hulu streaming service as well as the upcoming ESPN streamer. The deal also returns to Spectrum cable eight Disney-owned channels (most notably Freeform and FXX) that were removed after a 2023 retransmission agreement between the two companies.	

== July ==
Date	Event	Ref.
1	The FCC approves the planned sale of five stations by Sinclair Broadcast Group to Rincon Broadcasting Group: WVTV/Milwaukee (The CW/MyNetworkTV), KTVO/Kirksville-Ottumwa (ABC/CBS), KHQA/Hannibal-Quincy (CBS/ABC), and WICS/WICD/Springfield/Champaign (ABC simulcast). The FCC also rejects a petition put forward by a public interest group, Frequency Forward, that sought to block the sale; the petitioner cited Sinclair's history of using "sidecar" relationships with closely-related companies to skirt ownership caps.	
2	Paramount Global, parent company of CBS News, announces it will agree to a $16 million settlement with Donald Trump over a lawsuit Trump filed regarding the editing of an October 2024 60 Minutes interview with Trump's then-opponent for the 2024 presidential election, Kamala Harris. Though legal and First Amendment experts have called as spurious Trump's claim that the interview's editing was election interference, the president's case was also seen as a potential roadblock in Paramount's proposed merger with Skydance Media, which was under review by the FCC at the time. Money in the settlement, which was reached after mediation (and does not include an apology from Paramount over the interview), will be allocated to Trump's legal fees and his future presidential library. Government officials (including Democratic lawmakers such as Elizabeth Warren, Bernie Sanders and Ron Wyden as well as FCC Commissioner Anna Gomez) and other Trump administration critics condemned the settlement as harmful to media outlets' First Amendment rights, with some lawmakers accusing Paramount of committing bribery to facilitate the Skydance deal's approval.	(Note: Donald Trump's appointee as FCC chairman, Brendan Carr, revived a complaint a conservative group filed at the Commission against CBS (see 1/16 entry), and had requested raw footage and transcripts from the 60 Minutes interview with Harris. The FCC must review the Paramount-Skydance deal as it involves the license transfer of 27 CBS-owned television stations.)
2	Merit Street Media, owner of the Merit TV digital multicast network, files for Chapter 11 bankruptcy protection. As part of the bankruptcy filing, the company founded by former talk show host Phil McGraw also files a breach-of-contract lawsuit against business partner Trinity Broadcasting Network, accusing TBN of failing to adhere to contractual commitments to provide national distribution and access to production resources. TBN would file a counterclaim against McGraw and his production company, Peteski, on August 19 claiming McGraw "fleeced" TBN and breached his contract with them. A judge would rule on October 28 that Merit Street's bankruptcy be converted to a Chapter 7 liquidation, a ruling McGraw is expected to appeal.	(Note: TBN holds a controlling equity stake in Merit Street Media, and has carried Merit TV as a subchannel on many of its stations.)
7	In a deal that E. W. Scripps CEO Adam Symson admits is a test of the FCC's new commitment to revise or repeal single-market ownership restrictions, Scripps and Gray Media announce a station swap that, pending FCC approval, would give both companies true or virtual duopolies in new markets. Gray will acquire Scripps Fox-affiliated WSYM-TV/Lansing (where Gray already owns NBC affiliate WILX-TV) and ABC station KATC/Lafayette (giving Gray a presence in each Louisiana market). Scripps, meanwhile, will expand its western footprint by acquiring Gray's CBS-affiliated KKTV/Colorado Springs (where they already own NBC outlet KOAA-TV), as well as KKCO (NBC) and KJCT-CD (ABC) in Grand Junction, and Fox station KSVT-LD/Twin Falls (where Scripps already owns ABC outlet KSAW-LD).	
17	CBS announces the cancellation of The Late Show with Stephen Colbert, which would air its final episode in May 2026, ending the franchise that David Letterman originated in 1993. (Colbert would acknowledge the news on-air during that night's episode.) CBS cited a sharp decline in advertising revenue for late-night shows in general for the cancellation (the show was estimated to have lost up to $100 million), which comes four months after After Midnight was cancelled and its post-Late Show time slot was subsequently leased to Allen Media Group (see 6/12 entry). The timing of the cancellation comes after Colbert, a longtime critic of Donald Trump and his presidential administration, criticized CBS parent Paramount Global's settlement on Trump's lawsuit against them for his 60 Minutes interview (see 7/2 entry) and comes as Paramount was seeking regulatory approval for Skydance Media's acquisition of the company. The timing of the cancellation prompts scrutiny from Trump administration critics (including Democratic lawmakers such as Adam Schiff, Elizabeth Warren and Pramila Jayapal), the Writers Guild of America (who sent a letter to New York State Attorney General Letitia James asking for an investigation into CBS' basis behind the decision) and Late Show executive producer Jon Stewart (in a July 21 monologue on sister network Comedy Central's The Daily Show) over whether the cancellation was politically rather than financially motivated, citing Trump's scrutiny of late night comedians' jokes and criticism towards him before and during his first presidency. This leaves NCIS as the last scripted show remaining from Les Moonves era to continue in production.	(Note: Colbert served as a correspondent for The Daily Show from 1997 to 2005, and hosted spin-off The Colbert Report thereafter until 2014, when he ended that program to succeed David Letterman as host of The Late Show.)
17	The House of Representatives gives final approval to a rescission bill that, among other things, cuts $1.1 billion in federal funds to the Corporation for Public Broadcasting for the 2026 and 2027 fiscal years. The rescission, which President Donald Trump would sign into law on July 24, would only affect a small percentage of direct funding to PBS (as well as that toward radio counterpart NPR), but is expected to more deeply affect local member stations and their parent organizations who rely more heavily on federal funds to cover the costs of station operations and programs. While federal funding for public broadcasting had previously enjoyed bipartisan support, eliminating CPB funding had long been desired by some conservative politicians and activist groups who had cited public broadcasting as unnecessary and allege liberal-friendly tilts in its news coverage.	(Note: Project 2025, which the Trump administration has reportedly used to guide its policy agenda and was co-authored by Office of Management and Budget chairman Russell Vought, recommended eliminating federal public media funding.)
22	A power transformer fire prompts the evacuation of the studios of KARE/Minneapolis–Saint Paul. No injuries were reported, but the fire forces KARE to vacate its Golden Valley studios and originate its evening newscasts from its transmitter site in Shoreview, while a morning anchor and meteorologist are flown to Atlanta to anchor the next day's morning news from Tegna-owned sister station WXIA-TV.	
24	In a 2-1 party-line vote, the FCC gives its approval to the merger of Skydance Media with CBS parent Paramount Global. The vote follows controversial months during which key CBS News figures resign, Paramount resolves a lawsuit from President Donald Trump, and CBS cancels its late night programming (see above) and much of its library of holiday special programming. It also comes after the agency receives assurances from Skydance that, once the merger is complete, the company would refrain from establishing DEI programs and would establish an ombudsman role to review any issues of unbalanced reporting at CBS News.	
30	Matt Damon and Ken Jennings win $1 million on Who Wants to Be a Millionaire for the Damon-founded charity Water.org in an episode that continues Damon's "feud" with host Jimmy Kimmel (a long-recurring routine on Jimmy Kimmel Live!). Damon and Jennings become the second team in the history of Millionaire's celebrity duo format to claim the show's top prize, following Ike and Alan Barinholtz in August 2024.	
31	Less than a year into its first season airing IndyCar events, Fox Sports announces an extension of its media rights agreement with the open-wheel racing circuit, and also purchases a one-third stake in its parent company, Penske Entertainment.	
31	Gray Media announces it will buy two stations from SagamoreHill Broadcasting, NBC affiliate WLTZ/Columbus, Georgia and Fox affiliate KJTV-TV/Lubbock, Texas. Gray already operates the stations for SagamoreHill, and will seek failing station waivers from the FCC to purchase them.	

== August ==
Date	Event	Ref.
1	One day after announcing it will acquire two SagamoreHill stations (see 7/31 entry), Gray Media announces another station purchase, an $80 million acquisition of Block Communications' remaining broadcast outlets. The deal includes WAND/Decatur, Illinois, WLIO/Lima, Ohio, both stations' related low-power outlets, and WDRB and WBKI/Louisville, Kentucky. It will be Gray's first foray into the Lima and Central Illinois television markets, while the Louisville stations (should the purchase receive regulatory approval) will create a triopoly with Gray-owned WAVE.	
1	Having seen most of its federal funding rescinded (see 7/17 entry), and with lawmakers declining to restore the money earlier in the week, the Corporation for Public Broadcasting announces it would shut down operations. A majority of CPB staff were laid off on September 30, after which a skeleton crew will remain to care for any remaining fiscal compliance, copyright, and other issues and obligations until CPB fully shutters at the end of January 2026. Created by the Public Broadcasting Act of 1967, CPB distributed federal grant monies to public broadcasters in television and radio (including PBS and its local member stations) to help cover the costs of content and operations.	
5	The Walt Disney Company announces that its ESPN will acquire the National Football League's NFL Network and NFL RedZone, which after regulatory approval will become ESPN-owned properties and be part of its new streaming service. In exchange, the NFL will acquire a 10% equity stake in ESPN, and grant ESPN rights to games and other content on NFL Network and Red Zone as well as from NFL Films, the league's production company that, along with its NFL+ subscription service, will remain league-owned.	
6	ESPN indicates that its streaming service will be the exclusive U.S. home to World Wrestling Entertainment's premium live events (PLEs), most notably WrestleMania, Royal Rumble, and SummerSlam, with an option to simulcast select events on ESPN's linear services. The 5-year deal, which will have an average annual fee of $325 million, supplants WWE's previous PPV deal with Peacock, which will remain home to the Friday night SmackDown (which also airs on USA Network). The ESPN/WWE relationship was initially announced to begin in 2026, but WWE would announce on August 20 that it would begin instead with the ESPN streamer's September 20 airing of Wrestlepalooza, making the August 31 Clash in Paris the last WWE PLE to air on Peacock.	
7	The merger of Skydance and Paramount Global (parent to CBS and Paramount Media Networks) formally closes, establishing Paramount Skydance Corporation.	
8	Two months after indicating it would put its television stations up for sale, Allen Media Group announces it will sell eleven of them to Gray Media: WAAY-TV/Huntsville, Alabama, WSIL-TV-KPOB-TV/Harrisburg, Illinois-Poplar Bluff, Missouri, WEVV-TV/Evansville, Indiana, WFFT-TV/Fort Wayne, Indiana, WCOV-TV/Montgomery, Alabama, KADN-TV/Lafayette, Louisiana, WTVA/Tupelo, Mississippi, WREX/Rockford, Illinois, WTHI-TV/Terre Haute, Indiana, and WLFI-TV/Lafayette, Indiana. The deal, should it gain regulatory approval, would give Gray a first-time presence in Tupelo, Terre Haute, and Lafayette markets while creating multiple-station duopolies with existing Gray stations in the other affected markets, as well as a potential duopoly in Lafayette (where a Gray deal to acquire Scripps-owned KATC is pending).	
11	In its first major deal as a merged company, Paramount Skydance announces it had acquired the U.S. broadcast rights to Ultimate Fighting Championship events in a seven-year, $7.7-billion deal that will take effect in 2026. The deal, which will replace an expiring package UFC had with Disney-owned ESPN, will see UFC events stream on Paramount+ with select simulcasts on CBS; it also eliminates the pay-per-view model ESPN used for certain premium UFC events.	
19	Nexstar Media Group announces a deal to acquire Tegna Inc. in a transaction valued at $6.2 billion. Should it meet regulatory approval and close as projected in the second half of 2026, the deal would expand Nexstar's broadcast stable to 265 owned-or-operated stations in 132 markets, including 41 of the top 50 markets, as well as potentially create multiple station duopolies (including combinations of Big Four-affiliated signals) in markets where both Nexstar and Tegna have a presence.	
27	Hours before the expiration of a carriage agreement between the two sides, and with negotiations attracting the attention of FCC chair Brendan Carr, YouTube TV and Fox Corporation announce a short-term agreement to keep Fox's networks and local stations on the vMVPD streaming service and avert being removed. The companies would announce a renewed deal on August 28.	
27	Separate from the Fox deal, YouTube TV also reaches an agreement with Herring Networks to carry far-right news/opinion channel One America News Network and upscale lifestyle network AWE on the service. The two networks were originally slated to be added in November, but would instead join the lineup on August 29.	(Note: Namesake social video platform YouTube previously demonetized and temporarily suspended OAN's YouTube channel in November 2020, citing repeated violations of its COVID-19 misinformation policies (pertaining to its endorsement of pandemic conspiracy theories and hoax cures) and declaring that OAN was not an "authoritative" information source.)
30	Wearing a tuxedo for the occasion, Lee Corso retires from the panel of ESPN's College GameDay. The former college football coach had been with GameDay since its launch in 1987, and was known for donning mascot headgears as part of the show-closing game prediction segment (he wears Ohio State's Brutus head to signify the Buckeyes as his final choice).	

== September ==
Date	Event	Ref.
3	The E. W. Scripps Company announces it will sell Fox affiliate WFTX/Cape Coral–Fort Myers, Florida to locally based Sun Broadcasting for $40 million. The deal (which is projected to close in the fourth quarter of the year, with Scripps using the cash proceeds from the sale to pay down outstanding debt) will create a duopoly between WFTX and CW affiliate WXCW. It was not immediately disclosed whether the deal will result in Sun severing an existing SSA formed in 2007 between WXCW and CBS affiliate WINK (owned by the Fort Myers Broadcasting Company).	
3	YouTube TV and Hulu announce agreements with C-SPAN parent National Cable Satellite Corporation to carry its three government and public affairs channels starting later in the fall. The deal, which will see both vMVPD services pay carriage fees (at 87¢/year per subscriber) equal to those that the network receives from cable and satellite providers, is a culmination of C-SPAN's efforts to obtain carriage on both vMVPD services dating to (at least) 2022, as the ongoing decline in cable and satellite subscriptions has accordingly reduced its operating revenue in recent years (C-SPAN's carriage revenue had declined by 29% between 2019 and 2023, from $64 million to $45.4 million). These efforts were further aided by U.S. Representative Mike Flood (R-NE) and U.S. Senator Ron Wyden (D-OR), who sent a joint letter addressed to Hulu and YouTube TV's respective CEOs on January 22, advocating for them to add the channels. (Prior to the deal, DirecTV had been the channel's only major streaming distributor.)	
4	Cliff Drysdale calls his last tennis match for ESPN (a US Open women's singles semifinal between Aryna Sabalenka and Jessica Pegula) and retires after 46 years with the network. A former tennis player himself (most notably a singles finalist at the 1965 U.S. National Championships and doubles champion with Roger Taylor at the 1972 US Open), Drysdale was among ESPN's very first hires in September 1979 (his first ESPN assignment was during its second week on the air).	
4	Alphabet reaches an agreement with Great American Media that would see family-oriented entertainment networks Great American Family and Great American Living being carried on YouTube TV starting in September, in addition to faith-based streaming service Great American Pure Flix being added to the vMVPD streaming service and the YouTube Primetime Channels store as an add-on subscription. The deal follows pressure from FCC Chair Brendan Carr, who, on March 7, sent an inquiry letter to YouTube TV alleging that the provider "deliberately marginalizes faith-based and family-friendly content" (based on claims made by Great American Media representatives).	(Note: The Federal Communications Commission does not have regulatory oversight over vMVPDs. Under Carr and predecessor Jessica Rosenworcel, however, the agency has opened several public comment inquiries and selected media companies have issued requests to the agency and Congress to expand the FCC's regulatory authority over pay television providers to include virtual pay television operators.)
7	The 2025 MTV Video Music Awards airs on MTV and CBS (being simulcast for the first time on the latter network) and streams on Paramount+ from the UBS Arena in Elmont, New York; LL Cool J hosted the ceremony. Notable winners included Lady Gaga (winning four awards among her twelve overall nominations, including Artist of the Year), Sabrina Carpenter (who won three awards, including Best Album for Short n' Sweet), Ariana Grande (whose musical short film, Brighter Days Ahead, was named Video of the Year) and the Rosé–Bruno Mars collaboration "Apt." (which won Song of the Year). Special awards went to Mariah Carey (with the Michael Jackson Video Vanguard Award), Busta Rhymes (the inaugural Rock the Bells Visionary Award) and Ricky Martin (the inaugural Latin Icon Award). The ceremony was watched by 5.5 million viewers, a 42% increase from the 2024 edition and its highest viewership since 2019.	
10	MSNBC fires analyst Matthew Dowd after comments he made during its coverage of the assassination of conservative activist Charlie Kirk, opining that the Turning Point USA founder's history of divisive views (including controversial remarks about women, Muslims, LGBTQ+ communities and people of color) "lead to hateful actions" in the current political environment, and theorizing if a supporter at Kirk's Utah Valley University campus tour stop fired the shot "in celebration". Both Dowd and MSNBC president Rebecca Kutler apologized for the former's comments that the network characterized as "inappropriate, insensitive and unacceptable" and were viewed by Kirk supporters as blaming him for the assassination, though MSNBC's dismissal of the former George W. Bush campaign strategist (who had been with the network since 2022) was criticized on social media by many Kirk critics and by Dowd himself (who opined in a September 12 Substack post that the network reacted to a "right wing media mob") as a capitulation to President Donald Trump and Kirk's other right-wing allies for highlighting his rhetoric.	
10	During a Fox & Friends segment (aired hours before Charlie Kirk's assassination) discussing an event that occurred in Charlotte, North Carolina on August 22 in which resident Iryna Zarutska was killed, host Brian Kilmeade makes comments endorsing the involuntarily execution of homeless people dealing with mental illness, in response to guest co-host Lawrence B. Jones's suggestion that they be held in jail if they decline to accept offered rehabilitation services. (Decarlos Brown Jr., a homeless man who suffered from schizophrenia and had a history of arrests and criminal convictions, was charged with murder in Zarutska's death.) Kilmeade was condemned and faced calls for Fox News to fire him for the remarks (with some critics contrasting it to the remarks that prompted Matthew Dowd's MSNBC firing) after the clip circulated on social media the following weekend. He apologized for the remark on the program's September 14 broadcast, saying it was "extremely callous".	
11	One day after the assassination of Charlie Kirk, Comedy Central temporarily suspends the South Park episode "Got a Nut" (which originally aired on August 6 and remains available on Paramount+) from upcoming linear airings. The episode, which parodies the second Trump administration's immigration policy and far-right podcasters, satirized Kirk's "Prove Me Wrong" debate approach to controversial topics (including a fictional "Charlie Kirk Award for Young Masterdebaters" given to young podcasters). Despite Kirk having called the parody a "badge of honor" in an interview with Fox News on August 7 (later cited by Charlie Kirk Show executive producer Andrew Kolvet in advocating for the episode's return), and the identity and motive of the perpetrator (who was turned into authorities on September 12) not known at the time, many of Kirk's allies and supporters claimed that his satirization might have contributed to his death.	
12	Sinclair Broadcast Group announces that it had acquired the non-license assets of ABC affiliate WLNE/New Bedford, Massachusetts–Providence, Rhode Island from Standard Media, which had acquired the station in September 2019 from Citadel Communications. The agreement, which saw Sinclair-owned NBC affiliate WJAR taking control of the station's operations, resulted in layoffs of multiple employees, including meteorologist Kelly Bates (who had left WJAR for WLNE in 2021, amid a contract dispute). Rincon Broadcasting Group would announce the acquisition of Standard Media on September 22 for $50 million; the deal includes WLNE's license as well as ABC affiliate KLKN/Lincoln, Nebraska and the duopoly of KBSI (Fox) and WDKA (MyNetworkTV) in Paducah–Cape Girardeau–Harrisburg.	
14	The 77th Primetime Emmy Awards air on CBS from Los Angeles' Peacock Theater. Hosted by Nate Bargatze, the ceremony's notable winners include The Studio (13 total wins, including Outstanding Comedy Series), The Pitt (five wins, including Outstanding Drama Series), Adolescence (six wins, including Outstanding Limited or Anthology Series), and The Late Show with Stephen Colbert (for Outstanding Talk Series, two months after its cancellation was announced).	
17	ABC suspends Jimmy Kimmel Live! indefinitely after two of its major affiliate groups, Nexstar Media Group and Sinclair Broadcast Group (the latter demanding his apology and a donation to Kirk's family and Turning Point USA), announce they would pre-empt the late-night talk show over comments during Kimmel's September 15 monologue accusing the Trump administration and other conservatives of politicizing Charlie Kirk's assassination to blame and seek retribution against the left (including the doxings and firings of those critical of Kirk's politics) and trying to distance themselves from any potential ideological ties with the alleged shooter. The network aired Celebrity Family Feud reruns in Kimmel's timeslot for the rest of that week. The suspension came hours after FCC Chairman Brendan Carr threatened possible actions against ABC (including revoking the licenses of its owned and affiliated stations, the basis of which likely would violate the First Amendment) over the comments in an interview with conservative commentator Benny Johnson. Nexstar executives denied claims of their suspension that it was related to Carr's comments (which they had not heard at the time) nor to Nexstar's seeking FCC approval to purchase Tegna. The move, viewed as an act of jawboning among various actions (including alleged efforts to restrict free speech) taken during Trump's presidency against critics and media outlets, sparked broad condemnation from political leaders (such as Senate Minority Leader Chuck Schumer, California Governor Gavin Newsom, Illinois Governor J.B. Pritzker, Texas Senator Ted Cruz and former President Barack Obama), entertainers and performers (such as Damon Lindelof, Tatiana Maslany, Ben Stiller and late-night colleagues like Stephen Colbert, Jon Stewart and Jimmy Fallon), and industry unions (like SAG-AFTRA and the Writers Guild of America), and boycotts of Disney properties (like Disney+ and Hulu). The suspension ended on September 23, with the show returning the following night; however, Sinclair and Nexstar continued to refuse to carry the program until September 26, when both companies announced that the show would return to their stations beginning that night.	(Note: The FCC has limited legal authority in regulating content (outside of obscene material), with the agency having previously held that "the public interest is best served by permitting free expression of views", and that "rather than suppress speech, communications law and policy seeks to encourage responsive 'counter-speech' from others". Carr had made previous public statements advocating against government intervention in regulating content aired by broadcast outlets (including satirical material) beyond the agency's limited regulatory scope.) (Note: Kirk's alleged shooter, Tyler Robinson (whose family is largely made up of registered Republicans), was registered in Utah as an unaffiliated voter; reports have conflicted as to Robinson's political leanings, though according to state voting records, he has not voted for any major-party candidates in state and federal elections since becoming eligible to vote in April 2021.)
23	News-Press & Gazette-owned KION/Monterey, California abruptly shuts down its news department, resulting in 16 employees being laid off and the cancellation of newscasts that the CBS/Fox affiliate produced for CW affiliate KCBA/Salinas (operated under an SSA with owner VistaWest Media) and Telemundo affiliate KMUV-LD. KION's newscasts (which were replaced by syndicated programs and early-evening news simulcasts from CBS owned-and-operated station KPIX/San Francisco) had consistently rated behind long-dominant Hearst-owned NBC/ABC affiliate KSBW at a distant second place (and for a time in the 1990s, fell to third behind even then-Fox affiliate KCBA's in-house 10:00 p.m. news); newscasts were even suspended for two months in 1996, during a newsroom merger with KCBA intended to improve viewership. The closure results in KSBW and Entravision-owned Univision affiliate KSMS, respectively, becoming the only English- and Spanish-language television news operations serving the Monterey–Salinas market.	
30	The Terms and Conditions page on the Versant website comes into effect, signifying the official beginning of company operations as a subsidiary of Comcast before the planned spin-off to its shareholders. Soon after, Versant bylines start appearing on the websites of USA Network, CNBC and MSNBC (now MS NOW, see "Conversions and rebrandings" section) as some of the assets which have been formally transferred from NBCUniversal to the company. On December 3, the Comcast board of directors gave the final approval for the Versant stock distribution to occur on January 2, 2026 (the stock will begin trading as the markets open three days later).	
30	The WNBA announces a ten-year deal with Versant (see above) that will see USA Network broadcast at least 50 regular season WNBA games annually, anchored by prime time doubleheaders on Wednesday nights, as well as exclusive rights to playoff games and the WNBA Finals in alternating years starting with the 2026 season. The agreement expands the game package that USA Network was to have offered under the deal that the women's professional basketball league signed with NBC Sports the year prior, under a broader deal valued at about $2.2 billion involving ESPN/ABC and Prime Video.	
30	Christina Derevjanik becomes the fifth Wheel of Fortune contestant (and the fourth to compete on the flagship syndicated version) to win the game show's $1 million bonus round prize, and its first grand prize winner since Melissa Joan Hart won on the ABC prime time celebrity version in October 2021. Derevjanik is also the fourth civilian to win the prize (eleven years after Sarah Manchester's win in September 2014) and the first winner under Ryan Seacrest's tenure as host. Derevjanik's single-day winnings of $1,035,155 also makes her the largest single-day winner in the show's history, beating the $1,030,340 record set by Autumn Erhard in May 2013.	
30	The linear and streaming properties of TelevisaUnivision (including Univision, UniMás and their owned and affiliated local stations, cable networks like Galavisión, Univision Tlnovelas and TUDN, and the add-on ViX streaming service) are removed from YouTube TV due to a carriage dispute centered on the vMVPD streaming service's reported proposal to relegate Univision and UniMás from its base channel package exclusively to its Spanish Plus add-on tier. The removal (which, alongside Fubo's December 2024 removal of the networks, leaves Hulu and DirecTV as the only major vMVPDs carrying them) came amid criticism from Hispanic advocacy groups and some politicians over Google's perceived disnegotiation with TelevisaUnivision; it also occurs the same day that YouTube TV temporarily extended an expiring carriage agreement with NBCUniversal (owner of Univision's Spanish-language rival, Telemundo), preceding a long-term agreement signed on October 2 that would also allow Peacock to be sold as an add-on through the YouTube Primetime Channels store, agreements which also covered the channels owned by Versant (see first entry this day). The flagship Univision channel would eventually be restored to YouTube TV on November 26, while the other TelevisaUnivision networks were restored on December 5.	
30	Monumental Sports Network is removed from YouTube TV and Hulu due to carriage disputes with parent Monumental Sports and Entertainment, owner of the four Washington, D.C.-area sports teams that serve as the regional sports network's broadcast partners: the Washington Wizards (NBA), Capital City Go-Go (NBA G League), Washington Mystics (WNBA) and Washington Capitals (NHL). The dispute (which, combined with Fubo's June 2024 removal of the network, leaves DirecTV as its only remaining vMVPD distributor) follows recent carriage deals involving Monumental and two other providers: DirecTV announced a renewed deal on October 1, that added Monumental Sports to its "MyHome Team" add-on tier (launched on March 13 as a complement to the satellite/streaming provider's a la carté sports package), while Comcast reached an agreement on September 24, that saw Xfinity relegate the network (and complimentary access to its Monumental+ streaming service) exclusively to its two higher-end channel tiers.	

== October ==
Date	Event	Ref.
2	David Del Rio is fired from his role as legal associate Billy Martinez in Matlock following a complaint alleging that he had sexually assaulted co-star Leah Lewis, who plays fellow legal associate Sarah Franklin in the CBS legal drama, on September 26. Del Rio's dismissal, which was first reported by Deadline Hollywood on October 9, followed an internal investigation by series distributor CBS Studios conducted the day of his dismissal, when the complaint was filed, just two weeks prior to a planned six-week production hiatus of the show's second season.	
2	WildBrain and the estate of Charles M. Schulz announce a five-year extension of its agreement with Apple TV+ continuing to give Apple exclusive rights to the entire Peanuts library through 2030, under the same terms as the previous agreement signed in 2020, in which formerly perennial rerun specials It's the Great Pumpkin, Charlie Brown, A Charlie Brown Thanksgiving and A Charlie Brown Christmas are made available free to those with Apple accounts during specified windows before each respective holiday. The agreement stipulates that Apple will specifically be the exclusive streaming home of the library, with no direct mention of linear broadcast rights; none of the specials have been licensed to linear television since a two-year transitional agreement with PBS/PBS Kids expired after 2021.	
17	Formula One announces a 5-year deal with Apple TV, which the streaming service will become the exclusive U.S. broadcast home of the international racing circuit beginning in 2026. The new deal replaces F1's relationship with ESPN, which began in 2018 and expired at the end of the 2025 season. Unlike Apple TV's deal with Major League Soccer which features its MLS Season Pass as a separately charged service (see November 13), all Apple TV service subscribers will have access to all F1 content offered by Apple TV.	
21	With a doubleheader of Houston Rockets at Oklahoma City Thunder and Golden State Warriors at Los Angeles Lakers, NBC returns to covering the National Basketball Association after a 23-year hiatus. As part of its new deal with the league, NBC will carry doubleheaders on Tuesday nights, Sunday night games later in the season, and exclusive Monday games on Peacock.	
24–November 1	The Major League Baseball's World Series airs on Fox, with the Los Angeles Dodgers defeating the Toronto Blue Jays in a 4–3 game victory. With the Edmonton Oilers' participation in the NHL's Stanley Cup Final earlier in the year, it marks the first time since 1993, in which multiple non-U.S. teams from the four major professional sports leagues in North America reached their leagues' championship rounds in a single year (in 1993, the Blue Jays and Montreal Canadiens played in the World Series and Stanley Cup Final, respectively).	
28	E. W. Scripps announces plans to sell its ABC-affiliated station in Indianapolis, WRTV, to Circle City Broadcasting. Should the $83 million deal gain regulatory approval, WRTV will become Circle City's third full-power television station in the Indy market (joining CW affiliate WISH-TV and MyNetworkTV outlet WNDY-TV).	
30	The Walt Disney Company's broadcast and cable networks (including ABC and its owned and affiliated local stations, the ESPN, Disney Channel, FX and National Geographic networks, and Freeform) are removed from YouTube TV less than an hour before their existing contract was set to officially expire due to an unresolved dispute over carriage fees, the streaming provider's third carriage dispute of 2025 and Disney's fourth since 2021 (following previous disputes that the latter had with Charter Spectrum, DirecTV and Sling TV). The removal occurs one day after Disney completed its acquisition of a 70% stake in YouTube TV rival Fubo, giving it ownership of two of the major vMVPD streaming services (along with its existing ownership of Hulu's live TV service). The Disney networks return to YouTube TV on November 14 following a new agreement between the two sides.	

== November ==
Date	Event	Ref.
7	Sony Pictures Television and CBS Media Ventures settle a breach of contract lawsuit filed by the former in October 2024 over the distribution rights to Jeopardy! and Wheel of Fortune, in which Sony alleged that CBS failed to adhere fully to the terms of their U.S. syndication agreement and entered into unauthorized deals with certain international distributors. Under the terms of the settlement, Sony now gradually oversees various international distribution responsibilities for the two game shows starting on December 1, while allowing CBS to retain U.S. distribution rights through the 2027–28 season, after which those rights will transfer over to Sony. Sony will also assume marketing, promotion and affiliate relations for the shows starting in the 2026–27 season, though CBS will have exclusivity over ad sales through the 2029–30 season.	
13	Major League Soccer and Apple TV announce that their MLS Season Pass service will be discontinued, and that all MLS games will be available to all of the streamer's subscribers in 2026 at no additional charge (the paywall had already been lifted for the league's 2025 playoffs). Season Pass began in 2023, the first year of Apple's rights deal with MLS, as a stand-alone offer to both subscribers and non-subscribers of Apple TV. Separately, MLS also announces they have restructured its rights deal with Apple TV to end after its 2028–29 season (the deal was originally set to run through 2032).	(Note: MLS' 2028-29 season will be its second on a summer-to-spring schedule. MLS has utilized a spring-to-fall schedule since its launch in 1996; its move to the summer-to-spring format, which mirrors that of European soccer leagues, was also announced on November 13 and will begin with its 2027-28 season.)
19	Nine months after ESPN announced it would opt out of the last three years of its Major League Baseball deal (see 2/20 entry), the league formally announces replacement deals that run from 2026 until 2028. NBC Sports will carry Sunday Night Baseball and Wild Card playoff games on NBC, Peacock, and NBCSN, with the latter two services airing MLB Sunday Leadoff. Netflix also acquires a package of special-event games, most notably an opening night contest, the Home Run Derby, and the Field of Dreams game. Although its Sunday night rights end after 36 seasons, ESPN will remain involved with MLB through a 30-game national package, the MLB.tv out-of-market service, and streaming rights to the six teams whose local broadcasts are produced and distributed by MLB's in-house production team.	(Note: MLB Sunday Leadoff originated on Peacock in the 2022 and 2023 seasons before moving to Roku for 2024 and 2025.)
19	The 59th Annual Country Music Association Awards air on ABC from Nashville's Bridgestone Arena, with Lainey Wilson as host.	
22	After seven years co-anchoring the program, Dana Jacobson and Michelle Miller depart from CBS Saturday Morning. Both Jacobson and Miller were among several CBS News employees whose roles were eliminated in staff cuts announced on October 29, which also sees the weekday CBS Mornings team oversee production on Saturday Morning.	
24	Sinclair Broadcast Group reveals in a Securities and Exchange Commission filing that it has increased its stake in fellow television station group E. W. Scripps Company from 8.2% (a number revealed in a November 17 filing with the SEC) to 9.9%, and that it has tendered an unsolicited offer to acquire Scripps in its entirety. Scripps, seeking to "protect [its] shareholders from coercive tactics" and to give its board time to consider the offer and "any other potential strategic alternatives", would adopt a shareholder rights plan on November 26, lasting for one year.	
27	The 99th Macy's Thanksgiving Day Parade airs on NBC and Peacock from New York City. The broadcast had a record 34.3 million viewers, while the original 8:30 a.m. ET live morning broadcast averaged 25.4 million viewers, making it the most-watched entertainment telecast in nearly seven years. This marks its biggest combined audience on record, outperforming last year's parade by 2.5 million viewers, an increase of 8 percent. Meanwhile, the adults 18-49 viewership was up 13 percent from the previous year. The original broadcast marked the highest-rated entertainment telecast in five years.	

== December ==
Date	Event	Ref.
2	The pro wrestling promotion TNA announces its flagship program TNA Impact! will move to AMC beginning in January 2026, as part of a new deal with AMC Networks. Impact had been airing on AXS TV, a network owned by TNA parent Anthem Sports & Entertainment.	
5	Netflix, Inc. announces its intention to acquire the film and television studio properties of Warner Bros. Discovery, as well as the HBO premium channels and HBO Max. The US$82.7 billion deal is contingent on regulatory approval and the previously planned spinoff of WBD's cable properties into Discovery Global (see 6/9 entry). Paramount Skydance, which was one of the suitors WBD considered in an auction of bids, would on December 8 launch a hostile takeover bid for all of WBD, one WBD's board would declare superior to Netflix's in February 2026.	
17	CBS, ABC, and Fox interrupt their scheduled programming at 9:00pm ET due to a live address to the nation from President Donald Trump. The programs that were affected were the season finales of Survivor on CBS and of The Floor on Fox, and the holiday special iHeartRadio Jingle Ball on ABC. In addition, NBC also delayed the start of their special Christmas in Nashville to air the address.	
17	The Academy of Motion Picture Arts & Sciences announces that its Academy Awards ceremony will move to YouTube in 2029, part of a 5-year deal between AMPAS and YouTube that also includes carriage of related content including the Oscar nominees announcement, the Governors Awards, and the official Oscar Night Red Carpet pre-show. The move will mean the end of the Oscars' broadcast television history that began in 1953; ABC, which has carried the Oscars during most of that time (and every year since 1976), will continue to do so through the 100th ceremony in 2028.	
18	Two months after extending its exclusive rights agreement with Apple for the Peanuts library (see 10/2 entry), plurality shareholder WildBrain announces the sale of its share in franchise owner Peanuts Worldwide to a joint venture of co-owner Sony Music Entertainment Japan and American sister mass media company Sony Pictures Entertainment, essentially giving Sony Group Corporation control of the company with 80% of shares (the family of creator Charles Schulz is retaining their 20% shareholding).	
18	Eleven months after the pair took over its anchor desk, John Dickerson and Maurice DuBois host the CBS Evening News for the final time. Dickerson, who had served as chief Washington correspondent, debate moderator, and host of Face the Nation and CBS This Morning since joining CBS in 2009, announced on October 27 that he would depart CBS News on October 27, the first major talent departure from the news division since the Paramount Skydance merger earlier in the year; DuBois, who was previously at WCBS-TV/New York before joining Evening News, would announce his own departure from CBS on December 4. The network would announce on December 10 that Tony Dokoupil of CBS Mornings would move to Evening News in January 2026.	
20	Bowen Yang leaves Saturday Night Live as a cast member after six years. Yang had joined the NBC variety series as a writer in 2018, and became a cast member a year later.	
21	Two hours before it was set to air, CBS News cancels a segment titled "Inside CECOT" from this date's episode of 60 Minutes, which examined deportations of Venezuelan migrants (some of whom were in the U.S. legally) by the Trump administration to El Salvador's Terrorism Confinement Center, where some described facing "brutal and tortuous conditions". Bari Weiss, who became CBS News editor-in-chief in October, made the decision to cancel the report from the broadcast, citing other outlets already covering the story and needing "additional reporting" (including on-the-record comments from Trump administration officials) before it would air on a future 60 Minutes broadcast. But the segment's correspondent, Sharyn Alfonsi, condemns the decision in an internal memo, noting that the report, despite its absence of Trump administration officials (who declined invitations to participate), was thoroughly vetted by CBS' Standards and Practices division, and that its removal was "not an editorial decision [but] a political one." Despite CBS' move, however, the report circulates online after Global, which airs 60 Minutes in Canada, posted the original version of the episode, "Inside CECOT" included, on its streaming service the next day.	
23	ESPN announces that Pam Ward has retired from the network after a nearly 30-year tenure that began as an ESPNews anchor and had included studio show host roles and play-by-play coverage of college football, softball and women's basketball as well as the WNBA.	
31	With CBS' broadcast of the 2025 Sun Bowl, Gary Danielson retires as CBS Sports' lead college football game analyst, though his farewell remarks are cut off by a commercial break. Danielson, who spent 36 years in college football broadcasting (the last 20 with CBS), announced his retirement on March 26, at which time CBS announced that Charles Davis would succeed Danielson in the primary game analyst chair starting in 2026.	
31	CBS' airing of New Year's Eve Live: Nashville's Big Bash is interrupted 42 minutes into the broadcast when, during a performance by Lainey Wilson, it suddenly went off-air and is temporarily replaced by a rerun of Matlock. CBS acknowledges technical difficulties through on-screen crawls, and after 12 minutes, New Year's Eve Live resumes with co-host Bert Kreischer indicating that there was a power outage in Nashville.	
