= Brendan Carr =

American lawyer (born 1979)

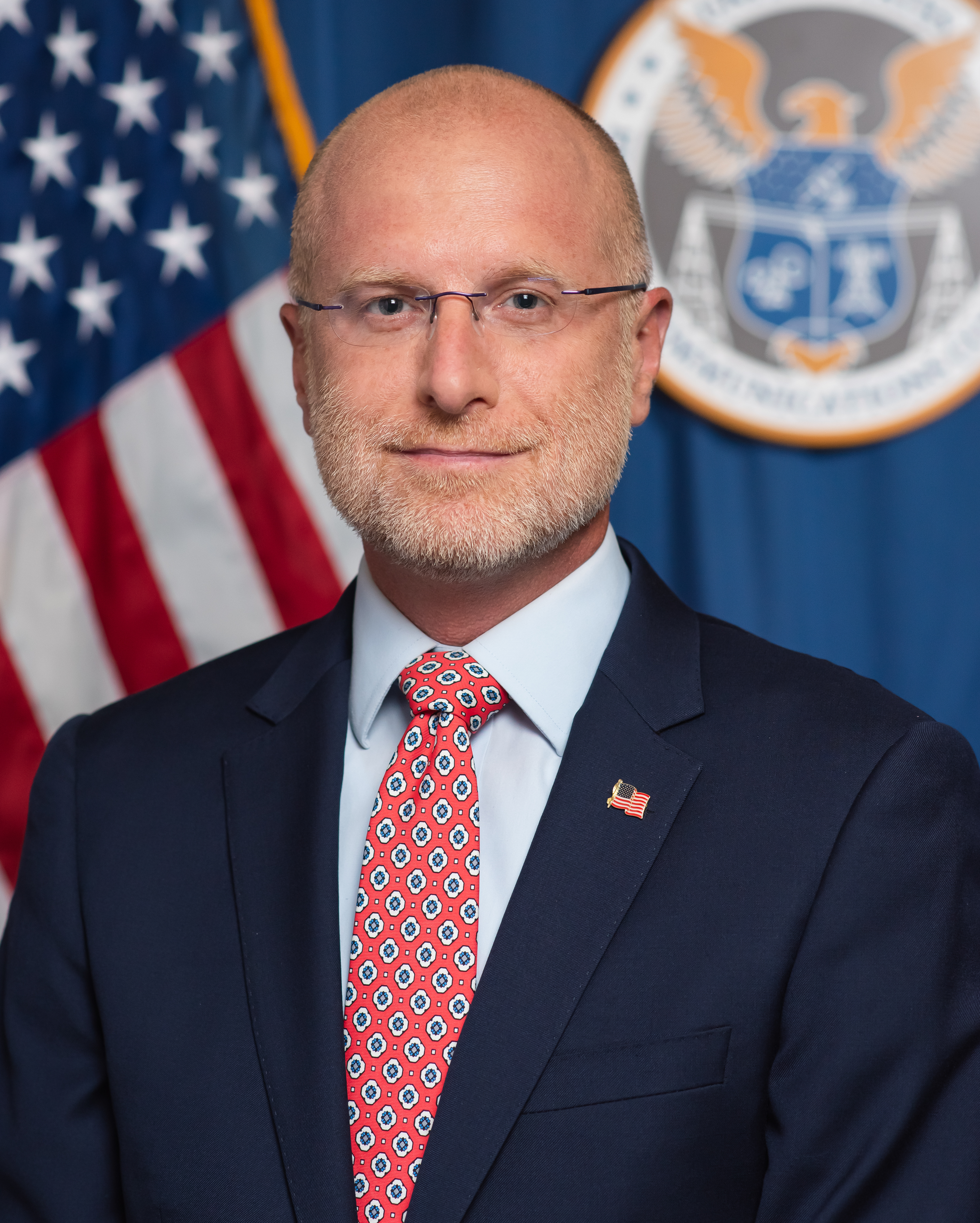
- Official portrait, 2025

31st Chair of the Federal Communications Commission
- Incumbent
- Assumed office January 20, 2025
- President: Donald Trump
- Preceded by: Jessica Rosenworcel

Commissioner of the Federal Communications Commission
- Incumbent
- Assumed office August 11, 2017
- President: Donald Trump; Joe Biden; Donald Trump
- Preceded by: Tom Wheeler

Personal details
- Born: Brendan Thomas Carr; January 5, 1979 (age 47) Washington, D.C., U.S.
- Party: Republican
- Spouse: Machalagh Carr
- Children: 3
- Education: Georgetown University (BA); Catholic University of America (JD)

Brendan Thomas Carr (born January 5, 1979) is an American lawyer who has served as the chair of the Federal Communications Commission (FCC) since 2025. He has additionally served as a Commissioner of the FCC since 2017.

Carr studied government at Georgetown University and graduated from the Columbus School of Law at Catholic University of America in 2005. He worked in private practice before joining the FCC in 2012 as an attorney and becoming an advisor to Commissioner Ajit Pai in 2014. After Pai became the commission's chair in January 2017, Carr was appointed its general counsel. In June 2017, President Donald Trump nominated Carr to serve as a commissioner of the FCC. As commissioner, Carr initially focused on networks, although he began criticizing social media companies and China over perceived authoritarian policies later in his first term. He was involved in the development of Project 2025 and authored a section of the Heritage Foundation's Mandate for Leadership (2023).

On November 17, 2024, President-elect Donald Trump announced the appointment of Commissioner Carr to Chair of the FCC upon upcoming inauguration. Carr assumed office following Trump's second inauguration. As Chairman, Carr investigated companies over their diversity, equity, and inclusion (DEI) policies, threatening to block business decisions if organizational hiring practices were not changed. He was involved in the merger of Skydance Media and Paramount Global, securing an ombudsman to ensure different perspectives; Carr's role in the merger led to ethics concerns. Carr has sought to implement or broaden the FCC mandate to ensure public-interest programming, particularly in countering a perceived liberal bias in broadcasts. In September 2025, Carr threatened regulatory action against the Walt Disney Corporation's ABC broadcast network regarding its partisan late-night telecast Jimmy Kimmel Live!, leading to certain progressive and media criticism.

== Early life and education (1979–2005) ==
Brendan Thomas Carr was born on January 5, 1979, in Washington, D.C. Carr was the son of Barbara and Thomas Carr. Barbara was a clinical psychologist, while Thomas was a defense lawyer who once represented President Richard Nixon. He was raised in McLean, Virginia. Carr began attending the Potomac School in fourth grade and was a goalie on the school's varsity soccer team in his junior and senior years. According to Bloomberg News, Carr was noted for his "unruly behavior" on the field and as a "zealously competitive team player".

Carr attended James Madison University in his freshman year, then transferred and graduated from Georgetown University in 2001 with a Bachelor of Arts in government and a minor in history and anthropology. Following graduating, Carr began his career as a paralegal for a firm near the office of Bob Beizer, the president of the Federal Communications Bar Association and an associate of Carr's father. Beizer advised Carr to attend a law school of the Catholic University of America and earn a telecommunications certificate. Carr attended its Columbus School of Law and graduated in 2005 with a Juris Doctor, magna cum laude. He interned for the Federal Communications Commission's spectrum-enforcement division after his first year. Carr is a Republican and practicing Catholic.

== Career ==
=== Private practice and advisorship (2005–2017) ===
After graduating from the Catholic University of America, Carr worked for Wiley Rein, representing Verizon and AT&T. He temporarily worked for Court of Appeals for the Fourth Circuit judge Dennis Shedd as a law clerk from 2008 to 2009. He joined the Federal Communications Commission (FCC) in 2012 as an attorney in the Office of General Counsel. Carr became an advisor to commissioner Ajit Pai in 2014. After Pai became the chair of the FCC in January 2017, Carr was appointed as its general counsel. He later married Machalagh Carr, the former oversight staff director on the House Committee on Ways and Means, with whom he has two children.

=== Commissioner of the Federal Communications Commission (2017–2025) ===
In May 2017, Politico Pro reported that Carr was among several potential candidates to be nominated for the vacant FCC seat previously occupied by Tom Wheeler. On June 28, president Donald Trump nominated Carr to the commission. Carr appeared before the Senate Committee on Commerce, Science, and Transportation the following month in which he defended his independence over his association to Ajit Pai. On August 2, the committee advanced his nomination, although Democrats objected to a five-year continuation of Carr's term. The following day, Carr was confirmed by the Senate in a voice vote. As commissioner, he visited a fiber optic cable manufacturing facility in North Carolina that month. Carr marked his tenure with a focus on wireless infrastructure policy, particularly in streamlining deployment of 5G towers. He voted to repeal net neutrality rules in December.

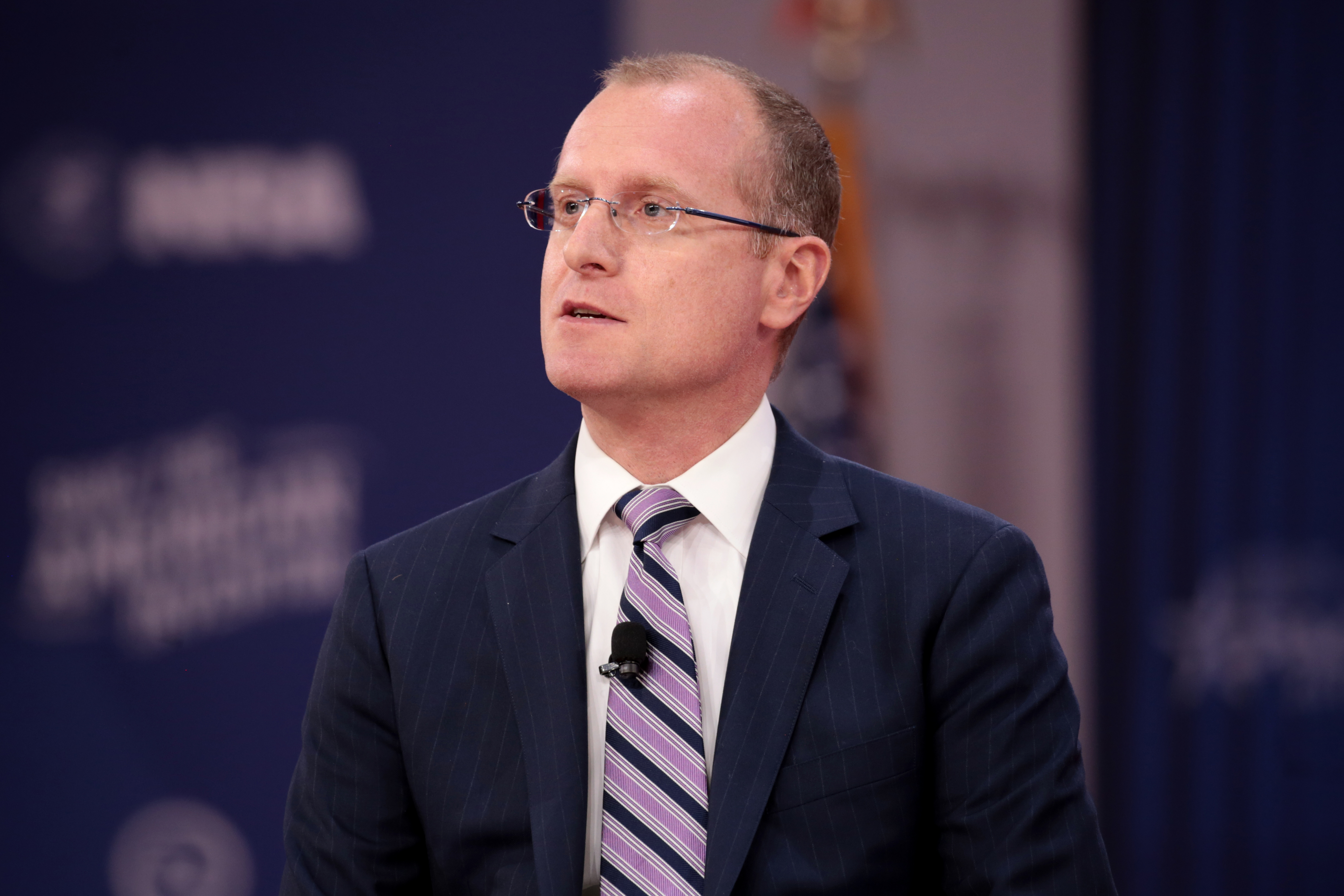
Carr speaking at the 2018 Conservative Political Action Conference

Although Carr was confirmed through the remainder of Wheeler's term, his nomination for a five-year term elapsed at the conclusion of the first session of the 115th United States Congress in January 2018. Democrats intended to combine Carr's reconfirmation with a nominee to succeed commissioner Mignon Clyburn, who was widely expected to retire. The Senate Committee on Commerce, Science, and Transportation voted to advance Carr's nomination for a five-year term in a 14–13 vote along party lines on January 18; Democrats mounted opposition over Carr's vote to repeal net neutrality. After his nomination was temporarily held up by West Virginia senator Joe Manchin over exempted rural broadband subsidies in the Mobility Fund and by Alaska senators Dan Sullivan and Lisa Murkowski over an Alaskan telecommunications company's exclusion from the rural health subsidies, Carr was confirmed by the Senate on January 3, 2019, amid a government shutdown that furloughed most employees at the FCC.

At a regulatory summit in Brussels in February 2018, Carr outlined a three-step process to ensure regulators are prepared for 5G. Later that month, he discussed streamlining the historic and environmental review process for 5G networks. Carr's plan received criticism from city officials, and also from Native American tribes—whose role in the review processes would be nullified, and consequently Democrats, although it was praised by telecommunications companies, including Sprint and AT&T; the plan was approved by the FCC in September. In July, Carr proposed a US$100 million telehealth fund for low-income Americans. The following month, the commission unanimously approved the fund as an extension of the Universal Service Fund.

Leading up to the COVID-19 pandemic, Carr began philosophically distancing himself from Pai, focusing on reforming Section 230 of the Communications Decency Act. He continued to focus on 5G, announcing a blueprint for the FCC to follow in March 2021. Nomination delays from president Joe Biden enabled the FCC to retain a majority. His efforts to advance 5G faced resistance from the Biden administration, leading to a public conflict between Carr and administration officials, including the president. He led an effort to withhold authorization from Chinese manufacturers, including Huawei and ZTE, over alleged national security concerns.

In September 2022, a policy advisor to Ajit Pai contacted Carr to introduce him to Wesley Coopersmith, the chief of staff to the Heritage Foundation president Kevin Roberts. Coopersmith informed him of a working project, later known as Project 2025, to redevelop the federal government towards a conservative philosophy, sending him the first and seventh edition of the Heritage Foundation's Mandate for Leadership. Carr told Coopersmith that he was interested in contributing to Project 2025; despite the possibility that Carr's work could be considered political activity by Internal Revenue Service statute, an ethics lawyer for the FCC determined that Carr would not be in violation of the Hatch Act, although she warned that he should distance himself from his work at the FCC. Carr wrote several pages involving telecommunications and technology regulation for Project 2025. His work included calling for regulating technology companies and imposing transparency rules.

== Chair of the Federal Communications Commission (2025–present) ==
=== Appointment and early investigations ===
As early as 2020, Carr was believed to be a possible successor to chairman Ajit Pai. After Donald Trump's victory in the 2024 U.S. presidential election, he was widely expected to be named as chair of the FCC. According to The New York Times, Elon Musk privately expressed support for Carr, with whom he had a good relationship. On November 17, 2024, Trump named Carr as his nominee for chair. Carr stated his intention to broaden the FCC's mandate to include social media companies.

Carr became chairman after the Trump's second inauguration on January 20, 2025, although he lacked a Republican majority, pending the confirmation of Olivia Trusty. That month, Carr ordered an investigation into NPR and PBS sponsorships as a violation of commercial advertising regulations and stated that he did not believe Congress should continue to fund both organizations. The following day, he requested a transcript of vice president Kamala Harris's interview on 60 Minutes; the FCC released the transcript in February. That month, Carr reopened a complaint against WPVI-TV that had been dismissed by Jessica Rosenworcel, his predecessor as FCC chair, over ABC's moderation of the September 2024 presidential debate between Trump and Harris. Carr also accused NBC of trying to "evade" the FCC's equal-time rule when Harris appeared on the final Saturday Night Live episode before the 2024 election.

Carr heralded a shift in the FCC's purpose towards leveraging the bully pulpit against opponents of Trump's ideology. An ally of Musk, he awarded Musk's SpaceX federal radio spectrum, and began an investigation into EchoStar over 5G deployment requirements, threatening to give satellite spectrum to SpaceX instead; in response to the inquiry, EchoStar stopped paying interest payments. In April, Carr urged European countries to sign contracts with SpaceX over Chinese competitors. He eliminated a proposal that would have barred landlords from forcing bulk internet service on residents, and publicly questioned the Global Positioning System, seeking alternatives. In March 2025, Carr announced an initiative titled "Delete, Delete, Delete" with the aim of eliminating existing telecom regulations. Carr utilized Direct Final Rule to remove regulations without the required full public comment period.

In February, Carr ordered investigations into diversity, equity, and inclusion practices at Comcast, as well as into KCBS over its coverage of immigration actions in San Jose, California. Commissioner Geoffrey Starks told ABC News that Carr's investigations of corporate DEI policies exceeded the FCC's statutory authority. In apparent response to Carr, Paramount Global, which had a merger pending before the FCC, ended its DEI policies. In March, Carr told Bloomberg News that he would block any mergers involving companies with DEI; the following week, he announced that he had opened an investigation into The Walt Disney Company over its DEI policies, and also threatened to revoke ABC's broadcast license over the practices. Citing a complaint from Great American Media, Carr sent a letter to Google chief executive Sundar Pichai and YouTube executive Neal Mohan asking if YouTube TV was engaging in "faith-based discrimination". The following month, T-Mobile closed its joint venture deal with Lumos Networks after agreeing to end its DEI policies. The FCC approved Verizon's acquisition of Frontier Communications in May, assuring a commitment from Verizon that it would end its DEI practices. In July 2025, Carr proposed abolishing the FCC's long-term broadband benchmark of 1Gbps download speeds and 500Mbps upload speeds, arguing that it was prejudicial towards slower satellite and wireless technologies; the policy was formally abolished in August 2026.

=== Broadcasting rules and review of ABC's Jimmy Kimmel Live! ===
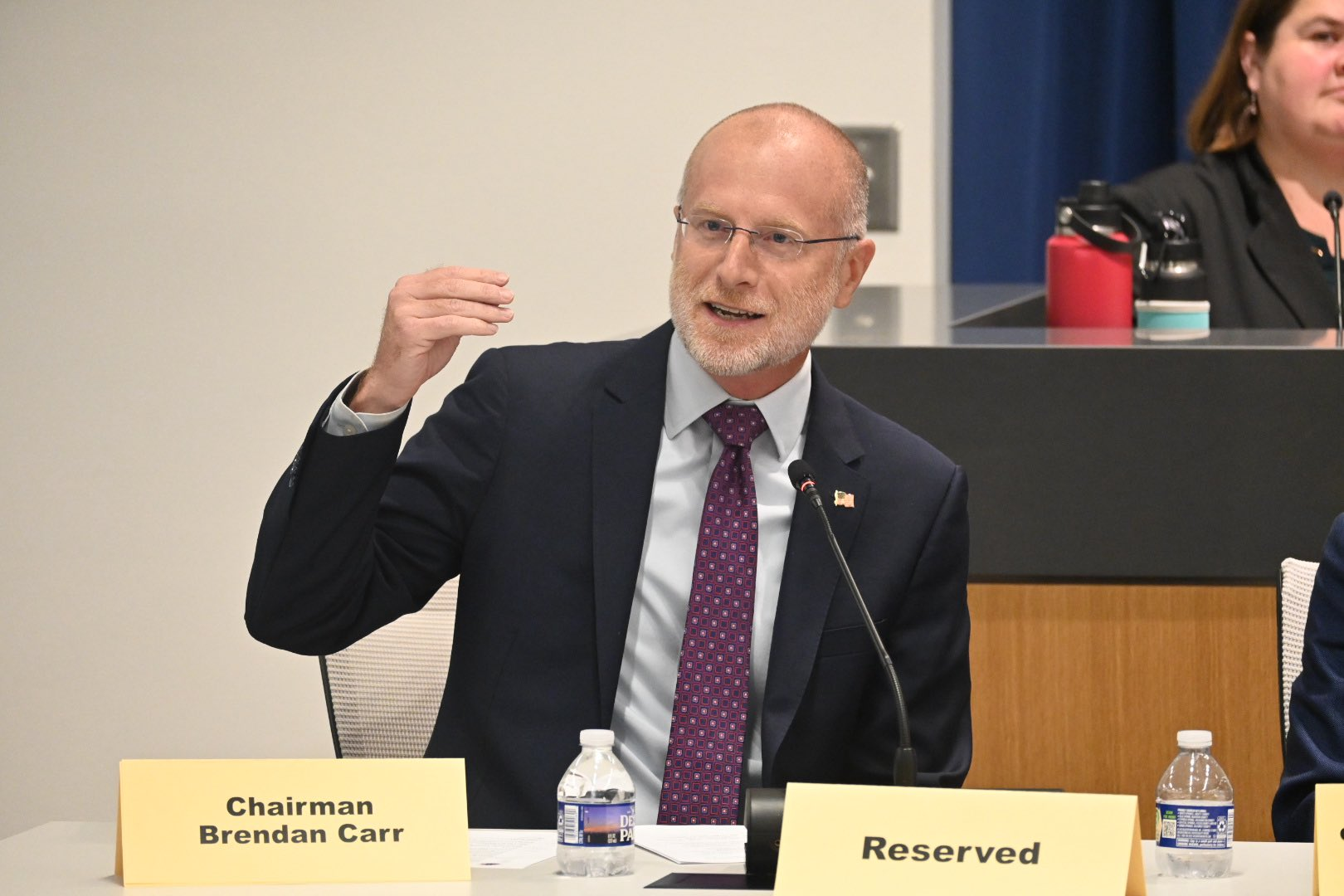
Carr speaking at a committee meeting in September 2025

The FCC returned to a quorum with Trusty's confirmation in June 2025, giving Republicans a majority. Carr moved to end net neutrality, although a federal appellate court had already struck down net neutrality regulations, and refused to enforce a rule that would have lowered prison phone call prices; Trusty and Carr voted to decrease the limit in October, although their proposed limit was higher than what had been set the previous year. Carr has sought to broaden the FCC's mandate to adjudicate what content appears on television, particularly in countering a perceived liberal bias in broadcasts. The commission approved Paramount Global's merger with Skydance Media in July, achieving a commitment from Skydance that the resulting company, Paramount Skydance, would not have DEI policies. The commitment included installing an ombudsman to ensure a "diversity of viewpoints". Carr suggested in an interview with CNBC that the cancellation of The Late Show franchise by Paramount subsidiary CBS helped the company comply with regulations. The Freedom of the Press Foundation filed an ethics complaint against him that month, citing his statements and actions in the merger process of Skydance Media and Paramount Global. Following the approval, Carr stated that Skydance Media's promise to eliminate bias "made the difference" in securing the deal.

In September 2025, Carr pressured the Walt Disney Company, which owns the American Broadcasting Company (ABC), over comments Jimmy Kimmel made about the assassination of Charlie Kirk, on his eponymous ABC show Jimmy Kimmel Live! Carr encouraged local stations to preempt Kimmel's show, stating in comments made on the right-wing political commentator Benny Johnson's podcast that the FCC "can do this the easy way or the hard way". Carr added that "companies can find ways to change conduct and take action, frankly, on Kimmel, or there's going to be additional work for the FCC ahead." Shortly afterwards, Nexstar Media Group, the largest television station owner in the United States, stated that it would not air Jimmy Kimmel Live! "for the foreseeable future". Nexstar was in the process of acquiring Tegna, the fourth-largest broadcaster, a move necessitating FCC approval; the company later denied that Carr's comments influenced its decision. Hours later, ABC announced that it was pulling the show indefinitely. According to The Wall Street Journal, the company's decision was made by Bob Iger, the chief executive of Disney, and Dana Walden, the co-chairman of Disney Entertainment.

House minority leader Hakeem Jeffries, joined by House minority whip Katherine Clark and House Democratic Caucus chair Pete Aguilar, denounced Carr's comments and called for him to resign. Senate minority leader Chuck Schumer also called for Carr's resignation, and wrote a letter to Carr along with ten Senate Democrats criticizing his comments and demanding answers to questions about their implications for broadcasters. Several Republican members of Congress criticized or expressed concern about Carr's comments, including Kentucky senator Rand Paul, as well as Texas senator and Committee on Commerce, Science, and Transportation chair Ted Cruz, who compared Carr's statements to mafia tactics and called the threats "dangerous as hell". Conversely, Trump praised Carr as a "great American patriot" and his actions, citing purportedly overwhelmingly negative coverage of his presidency. Kimmel's show returned the following week.

=== Equal-Time Rule under the Communications Act ===
After Disney's suspension of Jimmy Kimmel Live! following the ABC host's comedic remarks about Charlie Kirk's assassination, Carr publicly reiterated that enforcement of the equal-time rule on network television would be priority for FCC. In September 2025, Carr identified the ABC network's daytime program The View as a possible interest of equal-time regulatory review. In February 2026, Reuters reported that Carr had initiated an investigation into the ABC network's The View after it conducted an interview with Texas state senator James Talarico, a candidate in the United States Senate election in Texas. In November 2025, Carr reposted on X a Truth Social post from Trump calling on NBC to fire the late-night host Seth Meyers for his critical comedy of Trump. That month, he sent a letter to the chief executives of the BBC, PBS, and NPR, requesting a comment on whether a speech made by Trump before the January 6 Capitol attack was deceptively edited; the BBC had faced accusations of systemic bias over coverage of the speech, leading to resignations.

In January 2026, Carr issued a regulatory notice on the equal-time rule for television broadcasters about their morning and late-night talk shows. Commissioner Anna Gomez criticized the guidance and claimed that it furthered Carr's "ongoing campaign to censor and control speech." That month, Carr reserved that the same regulatory guidance in the notice would not be applied to talk radio. In February, the comedian Stephen Colbert accused CBS's lawyers of blocking him from interviewing Talarico in fear that Carr would target the network; Carr dismissed the concern as a "hoax". Carr's efforts to enforce the equal-time rule led to concerns from some media law experts and political operatives that Carr would stifle appearances from candidate in the 2026 elections.

In March 2026, Carr threatened to revoke the broadcasting licenses of television networks "running hoaxes and news distortions" relating to the Iran war. He reposted a Truth Social post from Trump that criticized the headline of an article in The Wall Street Journal about an Iranian airstrike as "intentionally misleading". That month, he voted to approve a merger between Nexstar Media Group and Tegna. Carr sought public input on a proposed policy to apply television ratings to content containing transgender issues and initiated a review of Disney's broadcasting licenses; the review was related to diversity, equity, and inclusion policies at ABC News, though it was allegedly expedited by comments Kimmel made at the expense of Trump and his wife, Melania.

In July 2026, Carr led the elimination of a regulatory rule established under the Biden administration requiring internet service providers to list discretionary monthly fees.

== Policy Views ==
=== Telecommunications and business affairs ===
In an interview with Politico Pro's Margaret Harding McGill, Carr stated that he found net neutrality rules unnecessary. He expressed support for encouraging industry investment and reforming spectrum auctions at the legislative level. As a commissioner, he voted to repeal a rule that required broadcast stations to have a physical studio for each coverage area. Carr criticized an internal plan from the first Trump administration that would nationalize 5G network construction, and later decried it as "China-like nationalization". Carr opposed secretary of transportation Pete Buttigieg's efforts to delay 5G network deployments amid apparent risks to flight safety. He dissented in a vote to revoke Starlink's rural broadband subsidies.

Carr supported a bill from Utah senator Mike Lee that would force the FCC to act within six months to act on mergers, although he approved of Ajit Pai's motion to hold a legal hearing over the attempted acquisition of Tribune Media by Sinclair Broadcast Group months later, citing Sinclair Broadcast Group's divestiture plan. In response to criticism from Democratic commissioners over a US$48 million fine against Sinclair that the commission's Republican majority approved in May 2020 following an investigation settlement, Carr referred to dissent as politically motivated. He approved of the merger of Sprint Corporation and T-Mobile US, as well as the attempted acquisition of Tegna by Standard General. Carr rejected the Open Markets Institute's argument that the FCC could block the then-proposed acquisition of Twitter by Elon Musk. After PayPal modified its policies to allow the company to fine users for promoting misinformation, he criticized the move as "Orwellian". In July 2022, Carr proposed forcing large technology companies to pay into the Universal Service Fund. After Apple moved to shut down Beeper Mini, he called to investigate the company.

Carr supports eliminating the National Television Ownership Rule, which prevents a single company from owning broadcast stations that reach more than 39% of TV households in the United States.

=== Freedom of speech debate related to public health / COVID-19 ===
In response to an opinion column in The Washington Post by Mark Zuckerberg, the chief executive of Facebook, outlining his ideas for removing harmful content, Carr criticized Zuckerberg's call for government regulation as a violation of the First Amendment. He later praised Zuckerberg's "instincts" to show Trump's posts that amplified COVID-19 misinformation unaltered. Carr supported Trump's "Executive Order on Preventing Online Censorship" targeting Section 230 of the Communications Decency Act. As Trump's social media use was threatened by misinformation, including involving the 2020 election, he offered a conservative case for reinterpreting Section 230, reaffirming Pai's supposed ability to do so in October 2020. His arguments were later litigated by the editorial board at The Wall Street Journal, the Heritage Foundation, and senators Josh Hawley and Ted Cruz. After Trump named Carr as his chair of the FCC, he vowed to "dismantle the censorship cartel and restore free speech rights".

After Democrats on the House Committee on Energy and Commerce pressured cable providers to answer to concerns that television programming contributed to misinformation about the 2020 presidential election in a letter, he described the letter as a "chilling transgression" of freedom of speech. In July 2021, Carr appeared with Florida governor Ron DeSantis to urge president Joe Biden to offer internet service to Cubans in an effort to circumvent censorship, an act that would allegedly violate international law. Carr has referred to free speech as the "bedrock of democracy" and described political censorship as a "tool that those in power use to suppress any challenge to their positions or orthodoxy". In 2019, Carr stated that the Federal Communications Commission does not have a "roving mandate to police speech in the name of the 'public interest.'" He has praised political satire as a method of criticizing individuals in positions of power, an argument he paralleled in defending free speech. In December 2024, Carr wrote a letter to Disney chief executive Bob Iger claiming that "Americans no longer trust the national news media to report fully, accurately, and fairly".

As chair of the Federal Communications Commission, Carr has voiced support for punishing broadcasters over alleged anti-conservative biases. He has advocated for repressing speech that he argues does not serve the public interest, including bias against conservatives. Following the suspension of Jimmy Kimmel in September 2025, Carr stated that he believed public broadcasters should serve the public interest and that local television stations had "every right under the law in their contracts to preempt" content that did not affirm that goal. He further stated that the U.S. was "in the midst of a massive shift in dynamics in the media ecosystem".

=== China policy ===
As China Mobile sought access to the U.S. market, Carr called for the enterprise's application to be denied and for China Unicom and China Telecom to be examined. At a meeting to discuss blocking broadband subsidies for companies that do not remove equipment developed by Huawei and ZTE, he warned that cell towers in missile fields in Montana are "running on Huawei equipment". Carr sought to add the drone manufacturer DJI to the Covered List, and referred to a report from The Washington Post that showed that DJI accepted Chinese state funding as "deeply concerning". Amid the COVID-19 pandemic, he began directly calling out Chinese officials on social media. Carr supported a ban on Huawei and ZTE devices. Carr has opposed TikTok over national security concerns; the Post described him as its "loudest media critic". In June 2022, he called for Apple and Google to remove the app from their stores, after BuzzFeed News reported that TikTok employees in China had purportedly been able to access data from American users.

=== Domestic and foreign issues ===
Carr denounced the Unite the Right rally in August 2017. In response to the World Health Organization's response to the COVID-19 pandemic, he stated that the organization had been "beclowned". Weeks after the first impeachment trial of Donald Trump, Carr described the House Permanent Select Committee on Intelligence as a "secret and partisan surveillance machine" and attacked its chairman Adam Schiff, questioning the collection and publication of phone records in Trump's impeachment inquiry. At a meeting with Georgia representative Buddy Carter in April 2025, Carr wore a gold lapel pin of Trump's face on his suit, in what was perceived as an indication of loyalty. In December, Carr told the Senate Committee on Commerce, Science, and Transportation that the Federal Communications Commission was not an independent agency of the United States federal government.

== Works cited ==
=== Articles ===
- Abrams, Rachel (February 22, 2021). "House Democrats Press Cable Providers on Election Fraud Claims". The New York Times.
- Adragna, Anthony (September 18, 2025). "'I can't think of a greater threat to free speech': Schumer demands Carr's FCC resignation". Politico.
- Adragna, Anthony; Hendel, John; Miller, Gabby (September 18, 2025). "'Be very careful': Some in the GOP balk at kicking Kimmel off TV". Politico.
- Ahn, Ashley (March 14, 2026). "F.C.C. Chair Threatens to Revoke Broadcasters' Licenses Over War Coverage". The New York Times.
- Arkin, Daniel; Collier, Kevin (September 18, 2025). "Jimmy Kimmel suspension puts spotlight on Brendan Carr, Trump's FCC chair". NBC News.
- Bellware, Kim (July 22, 2021). "Cuba censored the Internet amid protests. Florida leaders want Biden to respond with balloon-based wireless". The Washington Post.
- Blatt, Ben (October 28, 2025). "F.C.C. Changes Course on the Price of Prisoners' Phone Calls". The New York Times.
- Broadwater, Luke (September 19, 2025). "Trump Says Critical Coverage of Him Is 'Really Illegal'". The New York Times.
- Brodkin, Jon (May 2, 2022). "FCC Republican backs Musk's Twitter purchase, slams "restrictions on speech"". Ars Technica.
- Brodkin, Jon (July 13, 2022). "EU lawmakers slam "radical proposal" to let ISPs demand new fees from websites". Ars Technica.
- Brodkin, Jon (December 17, 2024). "Trump FCC chair wants to revoke broadcast licenses—the 1st Amendment might stop him". Ars Technica.
- Brodkin, Jon (March 18, 2025). "FCC to get Republican majority and plans to "delete" as many rules as possible". Ars Technica.
- Brodkin, Jon (September 2, 2025). "Delete, Delete, Delete: How FCC Republicans are killing rules faster than ever". Ars Technica.
- Cadell, Cate (February 1, 2022). "Drone company DJI obscured ties to Chinese state funding, documents show". The Washington Post.
- Calma, Justine (June 3, 2025). "FCC investigation looms over EchoStar's missed interest payments and a new satellite". The Verge.
- Carlos Lara, Juan (February 6, 2025). "FCC Investigates SF Radio Station for ICE Reporting, Sparking Press Freedom Fears". KQED-FM.
- Collins, Keith; Saha, Raj (September 19, 2025). "What a Local TV Merger Has to Do With Jimmy Kimmel's Suspension". The New York Times.
- Cowley, Stacy (January 2, 2022). "Verizon and AT&T Decline Regulators' Request to Delay New 5G Services". The New York Times.
- Davis, Wes (December 12, 2023). "Starlink loses out on $886 million in rural broadband subsidies". The Verge.
- Dou, Eva; Lima-Strong, Cristiano (November 17, 2024). "Trump picks Brendan Carr, who laid out agenda in Project 2025, as FCC chairman". The Washington Post.
- "Earnings triple-header". Politico. February 1, 2018.
- "FCC officials denounce white nationalists in Charlotteville". Politico. August 14, 2017.
- Feiner, Lauren (January 20, 2025). "Brendan Carr is officially in charge of the FCC". The Verge.
- Feiner, Lauren (March 12, 2025). "FCC chair asks the public to list every regulation he should remove". The Verge.
- Feiner, Lauren (June 17, 2025). "Senate confirms Trump's FCC pick, Olivia Trusty". The Verge.
- Feiner, Lauren (July 11, 2025). "FCC Chair Brendan Carr deletes net neutrality rules". The Verge.
- FitzGerald, Drew; Ramkumar, Amirth; Severns, Maggie (December 24, 2024). "How a Telecom Bureaucrat Learned to Speak Trump". The Wall Street Journal.
- FitzGerald, Drew (May 12, 2025). "FCC Threatens Charlie Ergen's Hold on Satellite, 5G Spectrum Licenses". The Wall Street Journal.
- Fischer, Sara; Rubin, April (December 17, 2025). "FCC chair suggests agency isn't independent, word cut from mission statement". Axios.
- Flint, Joe (September 17, 2025). "Disney Pulls Jimmy Kimmel's Show After Kirk Remarks". The Wall Street Journal.
- Flint, Joe; Simonetti, Isabella (April 28, 2026). "FCC's Brendan Carr Planning Early Review of Disney's ABC TV Licenses". The Wall Street Journal.
- Fried, Ira (May 28, 2020). "Tech, business, civil rights groups slam Trump's social media order". Axios.
- Friedman, Vanessa (April 22, 2025). "A Trump Lapel Pin Makes a Point". The New York Times.
- Gold, Ashley; Hendel, John (August 3, 2017). "FCC back to full five members as net neutrality vote looms". Politico.
- Gold, Ashley (May 16, 2018). "Net neutrality showdown day". Politico.
- Green, Jeff; Griffis, Kelcee (March 21, 2025). "FCC's Carr Threatens to Block M&A for Companies With DEI". Bloomberg News.
- Griffis, Kelcee; Miller, Hannah (November 7, 2024). "Media Executives See More Deals, Less Regulation Under Trump". Bloomberg News.
- Griffis, Kelcee (March 17, 2026). "How a Deep State Bureaucrat Became Trump's 'Fake News' Enforcer". Bloomberg News.
- Griffis, Kelcee; Kishan, Saijel (April 29, 2026). "ABC License Renewal Call Surprised FCC Staff And Shattered Norms". Bloomberg News.
- Grynbaum, Michael (January 31, 2025). "CBS News Set to Hand Over Transcript of '60 Minutes' Interview to F.C.C." The New York Times.
- Harwell, Drew (January 20, 2023). "As states ban TikTok on government devices, evidence of harm is thin". The Washington Post.
- Hendel, John (November 22, 2019). "FCC votes to edge Huawei, ZTE out of U.S. networks". Politico.
- Hendel, John; Woodruff Swan, Betsy (May 26, 2020). "Tensions flare as U.S. signals broader crackdown on Chinese telecoms". Politico.
- Hendel, John (June 2, 2020). "Trump's unexpected ally in the fight against tech". Politico.
- Hendel, John (October 13, 2021). "Biden's inaction is poised to hand GOP the majority on this key agency". Politico.
- Hendel, John (January 19, 2022). "How Washington flew into a 5G mess". Politico.
- Hendel, John (May 19, 2025). "A federal agency goes full Trumpist". Politico.
- Hendel, John (January 21, 2026). "Watch out, Colbert and 'The View': FCC warns TV hosts to air both sides". Politico.
- Hendel, John (January 29, 2026). "Talk radio isn't a target of FCC's 'equal time' notice, Brendan Carr says". Politico.
- Hendel, John (February 18, 2026). "Carr dismisses Colbert uproar as a 'hoax'". Politico.
- Hendel, John (March 17, 2026). "Brendan Carr's 'equal time' curveball crashes the midterms". Politico.
- Hendel, John (April 22, 2026). "Brendan Carr floats TV ratings for transgender content". Politico.
- Hollister, Sean (November 25, 2022). "The FCC just banned these Chinese cameras and telecom hardware from reaching the US". The Verge.
- Holmes, Allan (March 2, 2018). "5G Cell Service Is Coming. Who Decides Where It Goes?". The New York Times.
- Hsu, Tiffany (September 26, 2018). "F.C.C. Puts 5G Rollout Rules in Federal Hands". The New York Times.
- Isaac, Mike; Kang, Cicilia (May 29, 2020). "While Twitter Confronts Trump, Zuckerberg Keeps Facebook Out of It". The New York Times.
- Johnson, Ted (June 28, 2017). "President Trump to Nominate Brendan Carr to FCC". Variety.
- Johnson, Ted (July 19, 2017). "FCC Chairman: No Contacts With Trump, White House Over News Coverage". Variety.
- Johnson, Ted (August 2, 2017). "Senate Commerce Moves Forward on FCC Nominations Despite Democratic Opposition". Variety.
- Johnson, Ted (October 24, 2017). "FCC Eliminates Rule That Required Stations to Have a Main Studio in Local Coverage Area". Variety.
- Johnson, Ted (January 3, 2019). "FCC Will Return to Five Members, Just as Government Shutdown Drags On". Variety.
- Johnson, Ted (January 22, 2025). "New FCC Chair Revives Complaints About ABC, CBS And NBC Content That His Predecessor Rejected As 'At Odds With The First Amendment'". Deadline Hollywood.
- Kaczynski, Andrew; Steck, Em (September 19, 2025). "FCC chair once called government pressure on media a 'chilling transgression of free speech.' Now, he's doing just that". CNN.
- Kang, Cicilia (December 14, 2017). "F.C.C. Repeals Net Neutrality Rules". The New York Times.
- Kang, Cicilia (April 21, 2019). "It's U.S. vs. World as Big Tech Faces Specter of Limiting Speech Online". The New York Times.
- Kang, Cicilia (November 17, 2024). "Trump Picks Brendan Carr to Lead F.C.C." The New York Times.
- Kang, Cecilia; Satariano, Adam (December 30, 2024). "Social Media Companies Face Global Tug-of-War Over Free Speech". The New York Times.
- Kang, Cicilia (March 28, 2025). "F.C.C. Chairman Orders Inquiry Into Disney's D.E.I. Practices". The New York Times.
- Kang, Cicilia (September 18, 2025). "Who Is Brendan Carr of the F.C.C.?". The New York Times.
- Kang, Cicilia (September 24, 2025). "Brendan Carr Plans to Keep Going After the Media". The New York Times.
- Kanno-Youngs, Zolan; Green, Eric (November 29, 2024). "Trump Disavowed Project 2025 During the Campaign. Not Anymore". The New York Times.
- Kelly, Makena (October 29, 2020). "Meet the man who could lead the GOP's war on platform moderation". The Verge.
- Kile, Meredith (September 18, 2025). "FCC Chair Brendan Carr Warns 'We're Not Done Yet' After Jimmy Kimmel Is Pulled Off the Air". People.
- Koblin, John; Grynbaum, Michael; Barnes, Brookes (September 17, 2025). "ABC Pulls Jimmy Kimmel Off Air for Charlie Kirk Comments After F.C.C. Pressure". The New York Times.
- Koblin, John; Barnes, Brookes; Grynbaum, Michael; Mullin, Benjamin (September 22, 2025). "Jimmy Kimmel's Show to Return to ABC on Tuesday Night". The New York Times.
- Lebowitz, Megan (September 21, 2025). "Sen. Rand Paul says FCC chair's comments threatening ABC over Jimmy Kimmel were 'absolutely inappropriate'". NBC News.
- Leingang, Rachel (September 18, 2025). "'Censor-in-chief': Trump-backed FCC chair at heart of Jimmy Kimmel storm". The Guardian. ISSN 0261-3077.
- Leopold, Jason (February 28, 2025). "The Story Behind FCC Chairman Brendan Carr's Role in Project 2025". Bloomberg News.
- Levine, Alexandra (October 16, 2020). "Biden-Post saga collides with Section 230". Politico.
- Levine, Alexandra (March 15, 2021). "GOP FCC commissioner's vision for 5G". Politico.
- Lima, Cristiano; McGraw, Meridith (May 27, 2020). "Trump to sign executive order on social media amid Twitter furor". Politico.
- Lima-Strong, Cristiano (October 10, 2022). "PayPal faces backlash after floating fines for sharing misinformation". The Washington Post.
- Lipton, Eric (March 23, 2025). "Musk Is Positioned to Profit Off Billions in New Government Contracts". The New York Times.
- Littleton, Cynthia (July 18, 2018). "Sinclair Revises Divestiture Plan to Save Tribune Merger, Denies Misleading FCC". Variety.
- Littleton, Cynthia (May 22, 2020). "FCC Commissioners Blast Sinclair Settlement as 'Abdication of Responsibility'". Variety.
- Levy, Giana (November 16, 2025). "FCC Chairman Reposts Donald Trump's Call for NBC to Fire Seth Meyers 'Immediately'". Variety.
- Maddaus, Gene (July 24, 2025). "FCC Chairman Brendan Carr 'Pleased' With Skydance Commitment to Reform CBS". Variety.
- Maddaus, Gene (September 18, 2025). "Nexstar Denies Jimmy Kimmel Suspension Was Due to FCC Pressure". Variety.
- Markay, Lachlan (October 19, 2021). "FCC member targets Chinese drone giant". Axios.
- Mastrangelo, Dominick (July 29, 2025). "Press freedom group files ethics complaint against FCC chair". The Hill.
- McCabe, David (January 29, 2018). "FCC chairman slams Trump team's proposal to nationalize 5G". Axios.
- McCabe, David (September 15, 2019). "Senators Urge F.C.C. to Review Licenses of 2 Chinese Telecom Companies". The New York Times.
- McCabe, David (June 29, 2022). "An F.C.C. commissioner pushes Apple and Google to remove TikTok from their app stores". The New York Times.
- McCabe, David (August 14, 2022). "How Frustration Over TikTok Has Mounted in Washington". The New York Times.
- McCabe, David; Kang, Cecilia (October 13, 2022). "F.C.C. Readies Vote on Banning New Huawei and ZTE Devices". The New York Times.
- McCabe, David (November 20, 2025). "The F.C.C. chair questioned the BBC over edits to a Trump speech". The New York Times.
- McGill, Margaret (May 4, 2017). "FCC's top lawyer in the mix for commission's open GOP slot". Politico Pro.
- McGill, Margaret (August 21, 2017). "Carr heads to North Carolina to check out fiber deployment". Politico Pro.
- McGill, Margaret (November 13, 2017). "FCC's Carr on wireless, net neutrality and mergers". Politico Pro.
- McGill, Margaret (March 21, 2018). "Tribes accuse FCC of backing industry over Native American interests". Politico Pro.
- McGill, Margaret (March 3, 2019). "Trump campaign downplays split with White House on 5G". Politico.
- Mineiro, Megan (September 19, 2025). "Cruz Likens F.C.C. Chair's 'Threat' to That of a Mafia Boss". The New York Times.
- Mullin, Benjamin; McCabe, David (January 30, 2025). "F.C.C. Chair Orders Investigation Into NPR and PBS Sponsorships". The New York Times.
- Mullin, Benjamin (February 5, 2025). "F.C.C. Releases '60 Minutes' Interview With Kamala Harris". The New York Times.
- Mullin, Benjamin (February 12, 2025). "F.C.C. Chair Orders Investigation Into Comcast's D.E.I. Practices". The New York Times.
- Mullin, Benjamin (February 26, 2025). "Paramount Pulls Back on D.E.I. Policies". The New York Times.
- Mullin, Benjamin (July 24, 2025). "F.C.C. Approves Skydance's $8 Billion Merger With Paramount". The New York Times.
- Nover, Scott (March 19, 2026). "U.S. approves $6.2 billion merger set to reshape local TV". The Washington Post.
- Portnoy, Steven (February 12, 2025). "FCC head seeks investigation of NBCUniversal over DEI efforts". ABC News.
- Ravindranath, Mohana (August 3, 2018). "CMS drops new EHR incentive requirements". Politico.
- Ravindranath, Mohana (December 12, 2018). "With incubators, hospital systems tread ethical boundaries". Politico.
- Razor, Calen; McCarthy, Mia; Warmbrodt, Zachary (January 5, 2026). "Congress confronts Venezuela fallout". Politico.
- Rego, Max (September 18, 2025). "Who is FCC Chair Brendan Carr?". The Hill. Archived from the original on September 20, 2025.
- Rutenberg, Jim; Koblin, John (April 28, 2026). "F.C.C. Orders a Review of ABC's Broadcast Licenses". The New York Times.
- Robertson, Adi (August 3, 2025). "Brendan Carr declares victory over the First Amendment". The Verge.
- Roth, Emma (February 12, 2024). "FCC commissioner wants to investigate Apple over Beeper Mini shutdown". The Verge.
- Roth, Emma (March 12, 2025). "FCC chair asks if YouTube TV 'discriminates against faith-based programming'". The Verge.
- Roth, Emma (April 1, 2025). "T-Mobile closes Lumos deal after dropping DEI". The Verge.
- Roth, Emma (May 16, 2025). "FCC approves Verizon's $20 billion merger after it commits to 'ending' DEI". The Verge.
- Roth, Emma (July 1, 2025). "The FCC won't enforce a ban on 'exorbitant' prison phone call prices". The Verge.
- Schleifer, Theodore (November 13, 2024). "At Mar-a-Lago, 'Uncle' Elon Musk Puts His Imprint on the Trump Transition". The New York Times.
- "Senate Commerce considers FTC nominees". Politico. February 28, 2018.
- Shakir, Umar (January 28, 2025). "FCC chair says landlords can force bulk internet service on residents". The Verge.
- Shakir, Umar (March 6, 2025). "FCC chair says we're too dependent on GPS and wants to explore 'alternatives'". The Verge.
- Shepardson, David (September 19, 2025). "Trump's FCC Chair Carr uses old powers in new ways to rein in media companies". Reuters.
- Shields, Todd (February 24, 2023). "Tegna Buyout Shelved by FCC Order Sending $5.4 Billion Deal to Hearing". Bloomberg News.
- "Shutdown watch and contingency plans". Politico. January 19, 2018.
- Smith, Kieran; Hollinger, Peggy (April 14, 2025). "Top Donald Trump official tells Europe to choose between US or Chinese communications tech". Financial Times.
- Spangler, Todd (May 20, 2019). "FCC Chairman Backs T-Mobile, Sprint Merger With New Conditions". Variety.
- Stelter, Brian (September 18, 2025). "How Brendan Carr, the attack-dog FCC chair, helped take down Jimmy Kimmel with words, not actions". CNN.
- Suter, Tara (February 8, 2026). "FCC opens probe into ABC's 'The View' after James Talarico interview: Reports". The Hill.
- Tahir, Darius (July 12, 2018). "Markup season". Politico.
- Wardwell, Faith (September 18, 2025). "Jeffries condemns Kimmel shutdown, demands FCC chair 'resign immediately'". Politico.
- "Which Republicans could be swayed on net neutrality?". Politico. January 5, 2018.
- Zeitchik, Steven (March 19, 2025). "Trump's Media Pit Bull Is 'Off the Leash'". The Hollywood Reporter.

=== Documents ===
- "Questionnaire for Brennan Carr". United States Senate Committee on Commerce, Science, and Transportation. June 29, 2017. Archived from the original on July 15, 2025.
