= Merger of Skydance Media and Paramount Global =

2024 American media company merger

- Logos before the merger

- Logo after the merger
- Initiator: Skydance Media
- Target: Paramount Global and National Amusements
- Type: Merger
- Cost: US$8 billion
- Initiated: July 7, 2024; 2 years ago
- Completed: August 7, 2025; 15 months ago
- Resulting entity: Paramount Skydance Corporation (renamed Skydance Corporation)

On July 7, 2024, American media companies Skydance Media and Paramount Global announced a definitive agreement to merge in a deal valued at $8 billion, forming a new entity known as "Paramount Skydance Corporation". The agreement valued the newly formed entity at approximately $28 billion.

In 2023, after grappling with debt and striving to remain competitive in the entertainment industry, Paramount's parent company, National Amusements, explored potential merger and acquisition opportunities for Paramount Global. Skydance reached a preliminary agreement on July 2, 2024, to perform a three-way merger between it, National Amusements, and Paramount to establish what was then known as "New Paramount". After the merger closed, Skydance Media CEO David Ellison became the chairman and CEO of the combined company and former NBCUniversal CEO Jeff Shell became the president.

The deal was expected to close in the first half of 2025, pending required regulatory approvals, according to reports. The U.S. Securities and Exchange Commission and the European Commission (EC) approved the transaction in February 2025. On July 24, 2025, the Federal Communications Commission approved the merger between Paramount Global and Skydance Media. On August 1, 2025, Skydance announced that the transaction would close six days later, which occurred on August 7, 2025.

Paramount chose to conclude The Late Show with Stephen Colbert after Colbert referred to the $16 million settlement Paramount made with President Donald Trump on-air as a "big fat bribe". The move was widely seen as an attempt to appease Trump and Brendan Carr, who were targets and vocal critics of the show and Colbert, however Paramount stated that it was purely for financial reasons. After the merger went through, David Ellison made conservative-friendly changes to CBS News, including hiring political commentator Bari Weiss as its editor-in-chief. Trump praised the decisions to hire Weiss and to cancel The Late Show.

== Background ==
Paramount Global had faced significant financial challenges, worsened by losses in its streaming services, declining viewership across cable networks, and substantial debt management issues. National Amusements president Shari Redstone had expressed interest in selling her controlling stake in Paramount Global in December 2023 to Skydance. Redstone had been very particular about maintaining the integrity of Paramount Global's assets, especially CBS and Paramount Pictures. The media landscape was evolving rapidly, with Paramount struggling to compete against media giants like Netflix, Amazon, and the Walt Disney Company.

According to reports, Bob Bakish, the president and CEO of Paramount Global, and David Zaslav, the CEO of Warner Bros. Discovery, met on December 20, 2023, to examine the possibility of a merger. While representatives for the two businesses said that negotiations were in the early stages and would not guarantee a deal, it was revealed through insider sources that Zaslav was "not in deal mode".

Numerous prominent companies, such as Sony Pictures, Warner Bros. Discovery, Apollo Global Management, Edgar Bronfman Jr., Allen Media Group, and Skydance Media, had indicated their interest in exploring potential business partnerships or purchasing the company.

== History ==
=== Initial talks ===
According to reports on January 10, 2024, Skydance Media was considering making an all-cash bid of $2.5 billion for Paramount Global, while National Amusements was reportedly considering a deal or merger. Warner Bros. Discovery ended the merger negotiations with Paramount on February 27, 2024.

Skydance was approached by Paramount and National Amusements on April 2, 2024, regarding an exclusive acquisition window agreement. David Ellison and Shari Redstone aimed for a three-way deal involving the corporations. On April 18, 2024, Sony Pictures Entertainment and Apollo Global Management were considering making a bid to acquire Paramount Global.

On April 29, 2024, Bakish stepped down from his role as President and CEO. Reports characterized this as an ouster by Redstone due to Bakish's reported opposition of the Skydance deal. He was replaced by an office of the CEO, led by Brian Robbins, George Cheeks, and Chris McCarthy. According to SEC standards, McCarthy had to be named as the company's "interim principal executive officer" in order for one person to oversee "the normal course of business".

Sony and Apollo Global Management made Paramount a non-binding bid on May 2 for a $26 billion all-cash deal. Even though Skydance was still interested in purchasing Paramount, its exclusive negotiation window expired on May 3, 2024, and it was not extended. When the board members of Paramount gathered together the next day to discuss taking a "go-shop" approach to other bids of this like, they finally agreed to start negotiating with Sony and Apollo's offer while continuing to have non-exclusive conversations with Skydance. In an effort to forward their proposal, Sony and Apollo signed non-disclosure agreements before May 17 that permitted them to look into Paramount's confidential financial data. But at that same time, it was said that the businesses were reconsidering their strategy for a purchase involving the company's assets and were pulling back from their all-cash offer.

Skydance announced in late May that it would rework its offer to buy National Amusements, paying $2.25 billion and requiring that the company accept $1.5 billion in debt reduction funds, as reported by The Wall Street Journal, and that Paramount's shareholders receive $4.5 billion in cash. Paramount and Skydance had reached a merger agreement by June 3. An announcement of the final agreement was anticipated in the next few days. Redstone's National Amusements had not, however, officially approved the sale at that point.

Redstone was reportedly displeased with the revised terms, as she would now receive less money for her shares. Skydance also wanted Redstone to assume legal liabilities in the case of lawsuits by shareholders who were unhappy with the deal. She considered a sale of her company to another bidder, with such names as writer and producer Steven Paul, businessman Edgar Bronfman Jr., Bain Capital, Patrón Tequila founder John Paul DeJoria and businessman and former Paramount Pictures CEO Barry Diller in the running. On June 11, National Amusements announced they had failed to reach an agreement with Skydance to acquire Paramount.

Either party was given the option to end the deal if it wasn't closed by April 7, 2025, subject to two automatic 90 day extensions, or if it was blocked by a government regulator, with Paramount having to pay a $400 million termination fee. Paramount said in February 2025 and May 2025 that it expected the transaction to close within the first half of the year, but it did not happen. With the deal not yet approved, the first automatic extension to July 7, 2025, went into effect on April 8, 2025, after which the second automatic extension to October 4, 2025, went into effect on July 7, 2025.

=== Signing definitive agreement ===
On July 2, 2024, Skydance renegotiated the deal and reached a preliminary agreement to acquire National Amusements and merge with Paramount. The deal was referred by National Amusements to Paramount's special committee. The leadership team at Skydance approved of the possible sale of a number of Paramount properties that were judged "not strategic" for their goals, including BET and others. According to reports, Paramount started negotiations to sell BET Networks for $1.6–$1.7 billion to purchasers led by Scott Mills, the CEO of the business.

On July 7, 2024, Paramount's board approved the deal to merge with Skydance. The deal will close in two phases: first, a group of investors from Skydance will pay $2.4 billion in cash to purchase National Amusements, the parent company of Paramount Global; second, Paramount Global will pay its Class A and Class B stockholders $4.5 billion in cash and shares. In addition, Paramount will add $1.5 billion in primary capital to its balance sheet. The second phase will see an all-stock merger between Skydance Media and Paramount, valued at $4.75 billion. Equity holders in Skydance will get 317 million Class B shares, with a market value of $15 per share. Paramount Global would have 45 days to look for better or matching offers from other bidders before finalizing. If Paramount were to find a better offer, Skydance would be entitled to a $400 million breakup fee payout from the company.

According to Paramount Global, the merger would inject significant capital into Paramount, helping to address its debt and enabling investments in new content and technologies. It would support Paramount Global's expansion into other entertainment industries, such as animation, sports and video games, where it currently has less presence. Ellison's vision is for the new company "to be both a media and technology enterprise". Skydance would benefit from greater resources and infrastructure, allowing it to produce more large-scale content. Additionally, Skydance would gain from Paramount's brands, intellectual property, and distribution network.

On July 22, 2025, it was reported that Oracle Corporation was in talks with Skydance Media for a $100 million-per-year contract to provide cloud software once the latter's acquisition of Paramount Global is completed.

=== FCC and CBS ===
On October 6, 2024, Bill Whitaker interviewed vice president Kamala Harris during the 2024 presidential election on the CBS News program 60 Minutes, which aired on CBS. During the interview, Whitaker discusses the United States' relationship with Israel during the ongoing Israeli–Palestinian conflict, asking whether Israeli Prime Minister Benjamin Netanyahu was listening to the Biden-Harris Administration. Another CBS News program Face the Nation also briefly aired a preview of the interview. On October 16, the Center for American Rights (CAR) filed a complaint with the Federal Communications Commission (FCC) during the license renewal process for WCBS-TV, the CBS owned-and-operated station in New York City, requesting an investigation for "news distortion" in the airing of the 60 Minutes interview. CAR claims that the interview was edited to favor Harris, potentially violating FCC regulations. On October 31, then-former President Donald Trump filed a lawsuit over the segment claiming it was deceptively edited and constituted "partisan and unlawful… election and voter interference".

Outgoing FCC Chair Jessica Rosenworcel initially dismissed the WCBS complaint in January 2025, but it was revived by Trump's incoming FCC chair, Brendan Carr, who requested the raw footage and full transcript of the interview. CBS agreed to publicly release the footage and transcript on January 31, 2025, claiming that it was legally compelled to do so (although this was questioned by legal commentators). Although the WCBS FCC case is separate, news reports before the merger was completed suggested that the case could have influenced its approval. However, Carr subsequently rejected requests from CBS to re-dismiss the WCBS complaint, and Carr stated in an interview with CNBC the day after the FCC approved the merger that the agency's review of the complaint remained open after providing no timeline for the complaint's review the previous April. Carr also asserted before and the day after the FCC approved the merger that Trump's lawsuit was unrelated to the WCBS complaint. Nevertheless, The New York Times and The Wall Street Journal reported in January 2025 that CBS was considering settling the lawsuit, and Shari Redstone reportedly stated in a Paramount board of directors meeting in February 2025 that she favored resolving the lawsuit with mediation. In April 2025, Trump and Paramount began mediation over the lawsuit and the Paramount board of directors outlined terms internally for a potential settlement.

In the same month the mediation began, 60 Minutes executive producer Bill Owens resigned citing a loss of editorial independence. Owens resigned amid reports that Redstone was seeking a list of upcoming 60 Minutes segments about Trump the show was planning to air (which Owens later confirmed in public remarks). The following month, CBS News CEO Wendy McMahon resigned following a dispute with Redstone over McMahon's reprimanding CBS Mornings anchor Tony Dokoupil for not following the organization's editorial standards in an interview with author Ta-Nehisi Coates in October 2024 about the Gaza war and for settling the 60 Minutes lawsuit. After the Owens and McMahon resignations, U.S. Senators Elizabeth Warren, Bernie Sanders, and Ron Wyden sent a letter to Redstone requesting information about the mediation process over concerns that settling the 60 Minutes lawsuit could violate anti-bribery laws due to the merger and Warren called for an investigation of the settlement after it was reached. Redstone reportedly recused herself from the Paramount board's internal deliberations during the mediation process, while Paramount issued a press statement prior to the letter asserting that the "lawsuit is completely separate from, and unrelated to, the Skydance transaction and the FCC (Federal Communications Commission) approval process." Paramount Global and Trump agreed to a settlement on July 2, 2025.

After the suspension of Jimmy Kimmel Live! (which occurred after statements by Brendan Carr in an interview asserting news distortion by Kimmel), Protect Democracy filed a petition with the FCC signed by a bipartisan group of former FCC commissioners and staffers (including former chairs Tom Wheeler, Alfred Sikes, Mark Fowler, and Dennis Patrick) urging the agency to rescind the news distortion regulation on First Amendment grounds. As part of FCC approval of the merger, CBS agreed to create an ombudsman to monitor its news division, while Trump claimed Skydance had agreed to give him $20 million worth of advertising and public service announcements (PSAs) following the merger as part of the Paramount lawsuit settlement (which Paramount denied). Also, while Paramount Global had ended its corporate DEI initiatives in response to Executive Order 14173, another condition the FCC required for final approval of the merger was for Skydance Media to not establish corporate DEI initiatives. FCC Commissioner Anna Gomez argued that the FCC's requirement of the ombudsman would undermine the editorial independence of the leadership of CBS News and would violate the First Amendment, while FCC Commissioner Geoffrey Starks (who resigned in June 2025) argued the February before the merger that enforcement actions against corporate DEI initiatives were outside the statutory authorities of the FCC.

Two weeks after Paramount Global agreed to settle the 60 Minutes lawsuit, it chose to cancel The Late Show with Stephen Colbert after Colbert referred to the settlement on-air as a "big fat bribe". While CBS released a press statement asserting that the non-renewal was "purely a financial decision", Elizabeth Warren and Senator Adam Schiff publicly questioned the company's assertions about the decision. After David Ellison met with Brendan Carr to discuss the merger less than 10 days before the FCC granted approval, Warren, Bernie Sanders, and Ron Wyden sent a letter to Skydance Media to request responses to questions about whether Skydance was involved in Paramount's decision to settle Trump's lawsuit, Trump's claimed advertising and PSAs agreement, the Late Show cancellation, and company policies related to compliance with anti-bribery laws. Replying after the FCC approved the merger, Skydance stated that it was not involved in the Paramount lawsuit settlement (as it was not a party to the litigation) or the Late Show cancellation decision and asserted full compliance with anti-bribery laws. After the FCC approved the merger on July 24, the Freedom of the Press Foundation filed an ethics complaint against Carr with the District of Columbia Bar for his actions and statements during the merger, alleging that they constituted misconduct and violated the First Amendment such that Carr should be disbarred. Following the approval, Carr stated in an interview to The Wall Street Journal that "The new owners of CBS came in and said, 'It's time for a change'" and that they said "'We're going to reorient it towards getting rid of bias.'" Carr added: "At the end of the day, that's what made the difference for us."

After the merger was completed on August 7, U.S. Representatives Jamie Raskin and Frank Pallone sent a letter to Paramount Skydance demanding internal company communications with Trump, the White House, the FCC, or The Trump Organization related to the merger, the Late Show cancellation, the Paramount lawsuit settlement and anti-bribery statute compliance, the Bill Owens resignation, and changes to CBS editorial practices. In response to a letter from Senator Richard Blumenthal from July, Brendan Carr denied that the agency actions in the merger were conditional on payments to Trump in the Paramount lawsuit, while Adam Schiff sent a letter to Carr requesting information from agency meetings with company executives about whether Trump demanded that the FCC require changes to CBS programming (including the Late Show) and editorial decisions as a condition to approve the merger. In November 2025, Raskin and Pallone sent a subsequent letter to Paramount Skydance executives renewing the requests of their first letter after concluding that the company's response to their initial request was "incomplete and inadequate" and "does not appear to reflect a good-faith effort to cooperate with our Committees' investigation."

In September 2025, Ellison appointed Kenneth R. Weinstein (the former CEO of the Hudson Institute, a conservative foreign policy think tank) as ombudsman for CBS News, who would report to Paramount Skydance executives and would not have a public-facing role (which was noted for being unusual for a news organization ombudsman). In the same month, CBS News announced that Face the Nation would no longer pre-edit interviews it airs following complaints from Secretary of Homeland Security Kristi Noem of the editing to an interview she did with the program. In October 2025, Bari Weiss (a conservative op-ed writer and columnist) was named as editor-in-chief of CBS News after Paramount Skydance purchased her website, The Free Press, and with Ellison serving as her direct superior rather than CBS executives. After Weiss was hired as editor-in-chief, the head of the Standards and Practices department for CBS News resigned, while CBS Evening News co-anchor John Dickerson, who over 16 years at the network had served its political editor, moderator for Face the Nation, co-host of CBS This Morning, and as a 60 Minutes correspondent, announced that he would be leaving the network at the end of the year after publicly criticizing the 60 Minutes lawsuit settlement the previous July.

In December 2025, Dickerson's CBS Evening News co-anchor Maurice DuBois announced that he would also be leaving the network at the end of the year. In the same month, Jamie Raskin sent a letter to Kenneth Weinstein to request information about the editing of a November 2025 60 Minutes interview of Trump and Trump's relationship with the network, while Weiss spiked a 60 Minutes segment titled "Inside CECOT" that examined the Trump administration deportations of Venezuelan immigrants to El Salvador to be imprisoned in part because the segment did not feature comments or interviews of any administration officials even though, according to 60 Minutes correspondent and segment presenter Sharyn Alfonsi, the production team reportedly sought comment and interviews from administration officials and were refused—which led Alfonsi to criticize the decision to spike the segment in an email memorandum to colleagues as being made for political rather than journalistic reasons and to express concern that requiring comment from the administration as a general practice would effectively eliminate the program's editorial independence. After Weiss appointed Tony Dokoupil as the CBS Evening News anchor effective January 5, 2026, the program announced that it was replacing its 38-page editorial standards handbook with a five-principle mission statement that included an explicit pro-United States editorial stance.

Despite commitments made by Ellison to the FCC during the merger process to not politicize the organization's news coverage, anonymous sources within CBS News and observers outside the company have suggested that Ellison's decision to appoint Weiss as editor-in-chief (despite her having no background in broadcast journalism or having been a reporter or correspondent) and Weinstein as ombudsman (despite having a limited background in media), as well as the decision to end editing of interviews on Face the Nation, were made to accommodate Trump's criticisms and complaints about the network. David and Larry Ellison were noted before the merger to have a close relationship with Trump, and Trump praised the decisions to hire Weiss and to cancel The Late Show. Commentary on Weiss' decision to spike the "Inside CECOT" segment has noted that it was made less than two weeks after Paramount Skydance launched a bid to acquire Warner Bros. Discovery (which would require regulatory approval from the Trump administration) and Trump making public complaints about 60 Minutes programming since the Paramount–Skydance merger, while commentary on the CBS Evening News January 2026 mission statement argued that it reflected a continued rightward shift to appeal to Trump supporters as viewers and further accommodation of Trump himself.

== Assets ==
=== Merged assets ===
Skydance Media and Paramount Global have been collaborating on multiple films ever since Skydance signed a five-year (since extended) partnership to co-produce and co-finance films with Paramount Pictures in 2009. Both companies co-own and produce numerous franchises, such as Top Gun, Mission: Impossible, Transformers film rights (co-owned by Hasbro), and Star Trek. Skydance aims to integrate its animation studio, Skydance Animation, with Paramount Animation and Nickelodeon franchises, including SpongeBob SquarePants and Avatar: The Last Airbender, to expand content offerings. With Paramount's acquisition, Skydance entered multiple markets, including broadcasting with CBS Entertainment, music with Paramount Music, home media with Paramount Home Entertainment and streaming services with Paramount+ and Pluto TV. Paramount also entered the video games market, with Skydance Interactive and Skydance New Media.

== Reception ==
=== Entertainment industry ===
There was opposition from Hollywood producers and creatives such as James Cameron, regarding the possible sale of Paramount to Sony Pictures. The main concerns revolved around the potential reduction in the number of studios producing content, which could have limited opportunities for writers and producers. The Writers Guild of America (WGA) had also voiced concerns about the consolidation trend in Hollywood, arguing that it could possibly lead to fewer choices and less diversity in content. The Writer's Guild later demanded an investigation into the canceling of The Late Show with Stephen Colbert, stating it had "significant concerns" that the cancellation was intended as a bribe for Donald Trump to approve the merger. Creatives like Jane Fonda and John Krasinski voiced their support for David Ellison, while Mark Wahlberg described a merger with Skydance as a "win for the industry". The television animated comedy South Park, which had recently completed a $1.5 billion dollar deal to stream on Paramount+, criticized and satirized the deal in its season 27 opening episode "Sermon on the 'Mount", released on July 23.

=== Political ===
The merger received criticism over the conditions and timing of the deal, with opponents characterizing it as "an effort by the government to exert political influence over the press". Critics described it as a capitulation of the media to Trump's personal agenda, and that "the timeline between that and the FCC's approval signals an unprecedented intervention by the government in the editorial operations of the independent press". FCC Commissioner Anna Gomez criticized the merger, saying in her dissent "In an unprecedented move, this once-independent FCC used its vast power to pressure Paramount to broker a private legal settlement and further erode press freedom ... Even more alarming, it is now imposing never-before-seen controls over newsroom decisions and editorial judgment, in direct violation of the First Amendment and the law."

Brendan Carr defended the deal, saying "I think it's time for a change" and that "President Trump is fundamentally reshaping the media landscape and the way he's doing that is, when he ran for election, he ran directly at these legal broadcast media outlets [...] For years government officials just allowed those entities [...] to dictate the political narrative and he has fundamentally changed the game".

== See also ==
- Media capture
- Merger of AOL and Time Warner (2001)
- Acquisition of NBC Universal by Comcast (2011)
- Acquisition of Time Warner by AT&T (2018)
- Acquisition of 21st Century Fox by Disney (2019)
- 2019 merger of CBS and Viacom (2019)
- Merger of Discovery, Inc. and WarnerMedia (2022)
- Acquisition of Warner Bros. Discovery by Paramount Skydance (2026)
- NTV affair
