= Anna M. Gomez =

American telecommunications lawyer

Anna Gomez
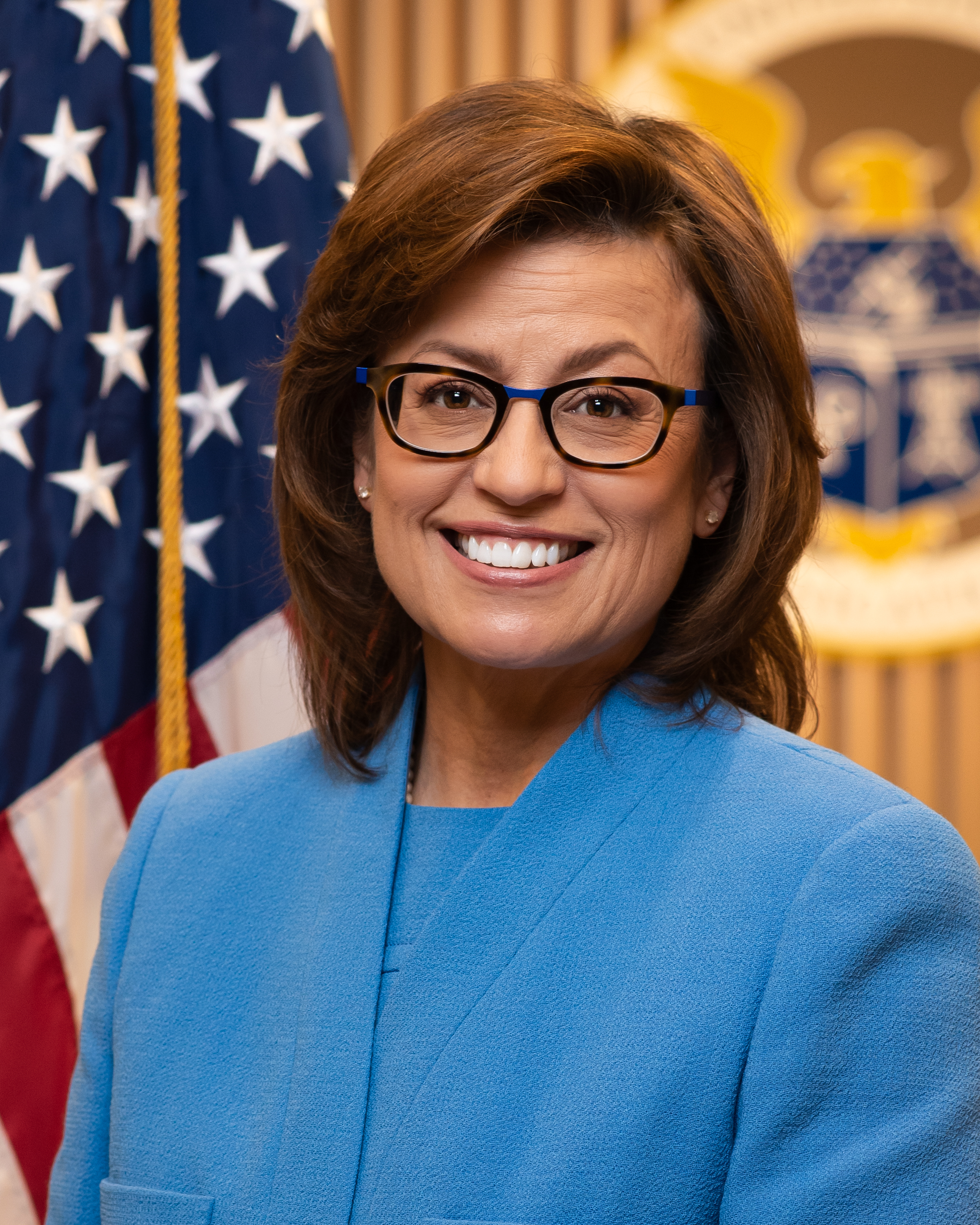
- Official portrait, 2023

Member of the Federal Communications Commission
- Incumbent
- Assumed office September 25, 2023
- President: Joe Biden; Donald Trump
- Preceded by: Ajit Pai

Personal details
- Born: Orlando, Florida, U.S.
- Party: Democratic
- Education: Pennsylvania State University (BA); George Washington University (JD)

Anna M. Gomez is an American telecommunications attorney currently serving as a commissioner of the Federal Communications Commission. From 2013 to 2022, she was a partner at the law firm Wiley Rein. In 2023, she was a senior advisor in the United States Department of State's Bureau of Cyberspace and Digital Policy. She was the deputy assistant secretary of the National Telecommunications and Information Administration from 2009 to 2013.

== Early life and education ==
Born in Orlando, Florida, Gomez spent her childhood in Bogotá, Colombia, before relocating to New Jersey with her family. She graduated from Pennsylvania State University in 1989 with a Bachelor of Arts degree in pre-law and from the George Washington University Law School in 1992 with a Juris Doctor degree.

== Career ==
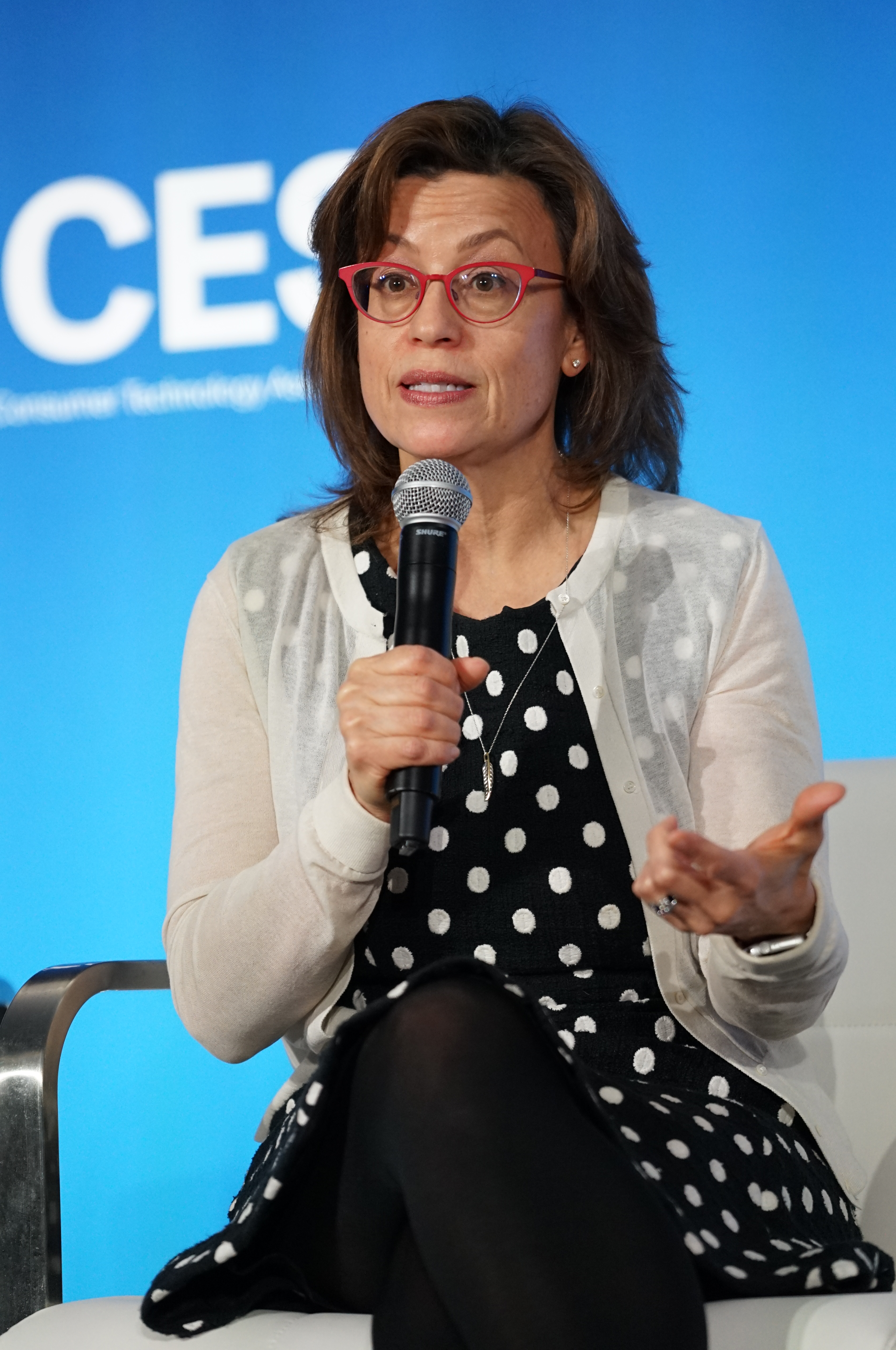
Gomez at CES 2026

After graduation from law school, Gomez worked as an associate at Arnold & Porter. She joined the Federal Communications Commission in 1994, serving as deputy counsel to the chief until 1996. Gomez served as deputy chief of staff for the National Economic Council. In 1997, she returned to the FCC, serving as chief and deputy chief of the Network Services Division. Gomez served as deputy chief of the FCC International Bureau and as a senior legal advisor to Chairman William E. Kennard. From 2006 to 2009, Gomez worked as the vice president of government affairs at Sprint Nextel. From 2009 to 2013, Gomez served as deputy assistant secretary of the National Telecommunications and Information Administration. From 2013 to 2022, she worked as a partner at Wiley Rein. From January until September in 2023, Gomez served as a senior advisor in the Bureau of Cyberspace and Digital Policy.

In May 2023, U.S. president Joe Biden nominated Gomez to the Federal Communications Commission following the failed bid of Gigi Sohn. The United States Senate Committee on Commerce, Science, and Transportation reported favorably on her nomination in July 2023. On September 7, 2023, the United States Senate voted to confirm Gomez with a vote of 55–43. Her term ends July 1, 2026.

== Defense of Jimmy Kimmel's freedom of speech ==
On September 17, 2025, Gomez appeared on CNN to defend Jimmy Kimmel's freedom of speech, arguing that his remarks criticizing MAGA were protected by the First Amendment. Her defense came after ABC News indefinitely pulled the late night show Jimmy Kimmel Live! from the air following pressure from FCC Chairman Brendan Carr.

On April 28, 2026, Anna M. Gomez, the lone Democrat on the FCC, said the effort to bring in Disney’s licenses for an early review is illegal.

“This is unprecedented, unlawful, and going nowhere,” Gomez wrote in a statement. “It is a political stunt and it won’t stick. Companies should challenge it head-on. The First Amendment is on their side.”
