= Lumos Networks =

American telecommunications company

Lumos
- Type: Subsidiary
- Traded as: Nasdaq: LMOS
- Industry: Telecommunications
- Predecessor: Segra
- Founded: August 8, 2011; 15 years ago (Lumos); 1895 (North State)
- Headquarters: Waynesboro, Virginia; High Point, North Carolina
- Area served: Virginia, North Carolina and South Carolina
- Key people: Brian Stading (CEO)
- Owner: T-Mobile US (50%), EQT (50%)
- Website: https://www.lumosfiber.com/

Lumos is a telecommunications company based in Waynesboro, Virginia; and High Point, North Carolina, United States, offering residential and business fiber-optic internet services, VOIP telephone, web hosting, and digital television. The company announced a merger with North State Communications effective August 15, 2022.

== History of Lumos ==
Lumos formally split from nTelos following the close of business on October 31, 2011. Following a 1-for-2 reverse stock split of nTelos common stock, nTelos shareholders received one share of Lumos common stock for each share of nTelos common stock that they owned following the split. Lumos Networks began to be publicly traded on the NASDAQ exchange on November 1, 2011, under the ticker symbol LMOS.

As of November 17, 2017, Lumos Networks completed a merger sale to EQT Infrastructure. Lumos stockholders received $18.00 in cash for each share of Lumos Networks common stock they held. Upon completion of the sale, Lumos Networks ceased to be a publicly traded company.

On April 10, 2018, EQT AB purchased a majority stake in Spirit Communications with the intent to combine Spirit with Lumos.

On January 14, 2019, Lumos Networks Corp. ("Lumos") and Spirit Communications ("Spirit") announced that the two companies have been re-branded as Segra. The company's Rural Local Exchange Carrier (RLEC) segment retained the Lumos Networks name and would be supported by a team of employees led by Diego Anderson, Senior Vice President and General Manager, Residential and Small Business.

== History of North State Communications ==
In 1895, local businessmen started the High Point Telephone Exchange in High Point, N.C. In 1899, J.F. Hayden, who started a telephone system in Thomasville, bought the High Point company; both companies grew quickly. In 1905, the High Point company was incorporated as North State Telephone Company. In 1919, Hayden bought the Southern Bell system in High Point, which had operated since 1907. In 1920 North State became the first telephone company in the state to install the automatic-dial system.

In 1929 the company bought the Randleman system, and in 1935 the Thomasville company became part of North State.

In 2004, NorthState began offering DirecTV digital satellite TV.

In 2005, NorthState spent $30 million to begin offering the area's first fiber optic residential service.

In 2007, the company began offering 3G mobile service.

On May 28, 2009, North State announced the brand name Plex, which included both landline and wireless telephone; high-speed Internet capable of 80 Mbits Down and 30Mbits Up; and Plex Advanced TV, a cable TV alternative using Internet Protocol with existing and expanded fiber optic lines capable of delivering HDTV and standard digital TV, as well as video on demand and digital music. The company added fiber optic service in new areas as it began offering the new TV service during summer 2009.

In 2010, North State ranked as one of the top 20 telecommunications companies in the United States.

Charlotte-based fiber optic service company Segra, part of MTN Infrastructure TopCo Inc., acquired North State in a $240 million deal completed May 19, 2020. At the time NorthState provided service to a 600-square-mile (1,600 km^{2}) area that includes High Point, Thomasville, Archdale, Randleman, Jamestown, Trinity and parts of Greensboro and Kernersville.

In October 2021, NorthState announced it joined with Lumos Networks. EQT Infrastructure has since sold Segra to Cox Communications. During 2022, NorthState has begun the process of expanding fiber internet services to 48,000 customers in parts of Greensboro, High Point, Oak Ridge, Randleman and Kernersville, and all of Walkertown. On August 9, 2022, NorthState announced plans for further expansion to over 23,000 customers in parts of Bethania, Pfafftown, Lewisville and Winston-Salem as well as 15,000 customers in Asheboro, Franklinville and Ramseur. Also in 2022, NorthState and Orange County, North Carolina announced a partnership to use American Rescue Plan money to bring fiber internet to 28,000 customers in Orange County.

On August 15, 2022, NorthState said Lumos was the name of the new company formed by the merger of NorthState and Lumos Networks.

== After the merger ==
On January 10, 2023, Lumos announced it would spend $100 million on 1200 miles of fiber optic lines in Lexington and Richland Counties in South Carolina. On March 28, 2023, Lumos announced plans to expand in the Spartanburg, South Carolina area. On April 4, 2023, Lumos announced plans to expand in New Hanover County in North Carolina. On May 24, 2023, Lumos announced plans for expansion in Harnett and Johnston Counties in North Carolina. During the last six months of 2023, Lumos expanded into Goldsboro, Burlington, Mebane and Clayton in North Carolina.

EQT Infrastructure announced a joint venture with T-Mobile on April 25, 2024, a deal expected to be worth $1 billion which would close late in 2024 or early in 2025, which would own Lumos. The acquisition closed on April 1, 2025 with T-Mobile and EQT each owning 50% of Lumos.

On July 24, 2024, Lumos announced plans to expand into Mahoning and Trumbull Counties in Ohio, with $230 million in investment planned and almost 2000 miles of fiber. On August 20, Lumos said it would spend $150 million for 1300 miles of fiber in Louisville, Kentucky and Jefferson County.

As of 2026, Lumos also had operations in Alabama, Florida, Georgia, Illinois and Indiana.
