= Anna Gomez =

Spanish basketball player (born 1986)

Personal information
- Born: May 6, 1986 (age 39)
- Height: 1.77 m (5 ft 10 in)

Sport
- Sport: Basketball
- Position: Point guard

Anna Gómez Igual (born 6 May 1986) is a Spanish professional basketball player for Valencia Basket of the Liga Femenina in Spain.

== Career ==
In 2004 and 2005, Gomez played in the National Youth League, where she competed at the 2004 U18 Women's European Championship and the 2005 FIBA Women's U19 World Championship. At these events, she scored an average of 4.6 points, 2.5 rebounds, and 1.1 assists per game.

From 2007 until her retirement in 2022, Gomez competed in the EuroLeague Women league, where she played for Acis Incosa Leon, Baloncesto San José, Ibiza - PDV, CDB Zaragoza, Namur, Lointek Gernika Bizkaia, and Valencia Basket. During her tenure, she averaged 4.9 points, 2.4 rebounds, and 2.5 assists per game. Further, she won a gold medal in the 2020–21 EuroCup Women.
