= Bob Bakish =

American business executive (born 1963)

- Born: Robert Marc Bakish; December 14, 1963 (age 62); Englewood, New Jersey, United States
- Education: Master of Business Administration
- Alma mater: Dwight-Englewood School; Columbia University
- Occupation: Former CEO of Paramount Global
- Term: December 4, 2019 – April 29, 2024
- Children: 2

Robert Marc Bakish (/ˈbækɪʃ/ BACK-ish; born December 14, 1963) is an American business executive. He was most recently the president and CEO of Paramount Global upon its formation on December 4, 2019 until his resignation on April 29, 2024 amid poor stock market performances and a possible Paramount major merger.

== Early life and education ==
A native of New Jersey, Bakish attended Dwight-Englewood School in Englewood, New Jersey, graduating in 1981.

He received a Bachelor of Science in operations research in 1985 from Columbia University's School of Engineering and Applied Science. He earned an MBA from Columbia Business School in 1989.

After receiving his MBA, Bakish joined the management and technology consulting firm Booz Allen Hamilton in 1990, and rose to become a partner in its media and entertainment practice.

== Career at Paramount ==
=== Early positions ===
In February 1997, Bakish joined Viacom. Initially as vice president of planning and development, he became senior vice president of planning, development and technology in January the following year.

In October 1999, he became the executive vice president of planning and business development of Viacom's subsidiary MTV Networks. From 2001 to 2004, he was executive vice president and chief operating officer of advertising sales at MTV Networks.

In 2004, he was appointed executive vice president of operations of Viacom, Inc., and in 2006, he was also appointed executive vice president of Viacom Enterprises. In these two positions, he was responsible for Viacom's strategic planning and business development and the oversight of a range of business units including Famous Music, Famous Players, Viacom Plus sales and information services and technology, as well as heading Viacom's cross-divisional marketing council.

=== Head of international operations at Viacom ===
In January 2007, Bakish became the president of MTV Networks International (MTVNI) responsible for financial and management, overseeing MTV Networks operations outside the U.S. He immediately restructured MTVNI by cutting 8% of the workforce, merging some overseas units with the UK business and devolving responsibilities for Latin American operations to new offices across the region. He launched the Colors franchise of networks through the Viacom18 joint venture in India.

- Laghate, Gaurav. "The big picture is that you can do business here: Robert M Bakish". Rediff. March 29, 2013.
- "It was a go big or go home play: Bob Bakish recalls Viacom18's early days". Adgully. November 21, 2017.
- Mike, Farrell (August 3, 2009). "Cable: Act Global, Think Local". Multichannel News. Archived from the original on November 18, 2018 – via HighBeam Research.
- Malhotra, Sarika (April 14, 2013). "People Business; Starring: Robert M. Bakish CEO, Viacom International Media Networks, Shailesh Rao, Vice President, International Operations, Twitter, Tom Mendoza, Vice Chairman, NetApp". Business Today. Archived from the original on November 18, 2018 – via HighBeam Research.

When MTVNI CEO Bill Roedy resigned in January 2011, Bakish was promoted to the newly created position of president and CEO of Viacom International Media Networks (VIMN). This promotion included responsibility for all Viacom media networks and operations internationally, including MTV, Nickelodeon, Comedy Central, BET, VH1, VIVA, TMF, Game One and MTV Tres; he also oversighted all of Viacom's international television-related joint ventures, including Viacom18 in India and ViacomSBS in Korea, as well as channel ventures with BSkyB in the UK and Foxtel in Australia. In all, VIMN operations at the time of his appointment consisted of 145 television channels in 160 countries and territories, plus related digital properties and consumer products businesses. During his tenure, Bakish expanded Viacom's international footprint, and VIMN was Viacom's most successful division; revenue doubled, and VIMN grew to more than 200 television channels. Under his leadership, the Paramount Channel was launched, offering movies and television shows in Europe, Latin America and Russia. He oversaw the expansion of networks such as Nickelodeon, Comedy Central and Spike TV to an increasing number of foreign markets, and helped orchestrate the acquisition of Channel 5 in the UK and Telefe in Argentina. He also oversaw the launch of apps, including the Viacom Play Plex suite of branded mobile TV apps and the BET Play direct-to-consumer subscription video-on-demand app for an adult audience.

=== CEO ===
In October 2016, Viacom named Bakish as acting president and CEO of Viacom effective November 15, to replace interim CEO Tom Dooley. He was also appointed president and CEO of the newly created Viacom Global Entertainment Group, which combined Viacom International Media Networks (VIMN) with Viacom's Music and Entertainment group, which includes MTV, Comedy Central, VH1, Spike TV and Logo TV; two additional networks, TV Land and CMT, also joined the Global Entertainment Group. Optimistic that Bakish could make good on his plans to turn Viacom's core U.S. cable networks and its Paramount Pictures film studio around, the board of directors of Viacom Inc. made Bakish's appointment as president and CEO permanent on December 12, 2016.

In early 2017, Bakish revealed a five-point plan to return Viacom to producing a steady profit. This consisted of focusing on Viacom's six flagship brands: BET, Comedy Central, MTV, Nickelodeon, Nick Jr. and Paramount; revitalizing content and talent; deepening distributor and advertiser partnerships to drive traditional revenue; increasing digital offerings, consumer products and live experiences; and optimizing and energizing the organization. The strategy also included having Paramount Pictures develop films and franchises connected to Viacom television content; additionally, Spike TV would be rebranded as and converted to a broad-based general entertainment channel, the Paramount Network, in early 2018.

By the fall of 2017 Bakish had restructured Viacom, replacing executives at nearly every company, including hiring Jim Gianopulos, formerly chairman and CEO of 20th Century Fox, as the new chairman and CEO of Paramount Pictures.

In 2018, Bakish's implementation of his five-point comprehensive strategy was credited with Viacom's much improved finances and improved company morale and focus. In 2018, under Bakish's direction and in accordance with his plan to capture younger and digital markets, Viacom acquired digital platform WhoSay, internet video conference VidCon, and online television network AwesomenessTV. In early 2018, Bakish also announced plans to launch an official Viacom streaming service, which would support ads and include series and content from Viacom that had not been available on other streaming services. In April 2018, Viacom launched Viacom Digital Studios, which would create new original content hosted on sites such as Facebook, Twitter and Snapchat. In addition, later that June, Bakish announced that Viacom would produce some new series exclusively for Netflix, beginning with Nickelodeon-related content.

In September 2018, due largely to his turnaround of Viacom, The Hollywood Reporter listed Bakish as number 20 in its The Hollywood Reporter 100: The Most Powerful People in Entertainment 2018.

Bakish retained the role of CEO when CBS Corporation and Viacom reunited under a single company to form ViacomCBS (later Paramount Global), which closed on December 4, 2019.

In 2023, Bakish's total compensation from Paramount Global was $31.1 million, representing a CEO-to-median worker pay ratio of 274-to-1.

In December 2023, Bakish and David Zaslav discussed the possibility of Paramount Global merging with Warner Bros. Discovery. TD Cowen analyst, Doug Creutz, stated that they were having "a very hard time believing the current FTC/DOJ, which has been very aggressive in combating industry consolidation", could help the two companies' merger go through. However, in February 2024, the discussion was abandoned.

On April 28, 2024, it was reported that Bakish would resign from his position as a CEO of Paramount due to the pressure from ongoing merger talks between Skydance Media and Paramount. Skydance CEO David Ellison would become CEO of Paramount once the merger closes, replacing Bakish; three interim co-CEOs were appointed following Bakish's resignation, including Brian Robbins and Chris McCarthy.

== Board memberships ==
Bakish has been on the board of directors of Paramount since its merger, and previously at Viacom from December 12, 2016, up until the merger. He is also on the board of directors at Avid Technology, Inc.

He is on the Board of Overseers at Columbia Business School, and is also an active member of its Media & Technology Forum. He is also on the Board of Visitors at Columbia University's School of Engineering and Applied Science.

Bakish was previously chairman of the board of Viacom 18 Media from 2007 until February 28, 2018. He was also Chairman of the Cable Television Advertising Bureau from 2003 to 2005.

== Personal life ==
Bakish and his wife Dee live in New York and have two daughters.
