= Douglas Walter McCormick =

- Born: December 15, 1949; New York City, New York, United States
- Died: May 9, 2022 (aged 72); New York
- Occupation: Venture partner

Douglas (Doug) Walter McCormick (December 15, 1949 – May 9, 2022) was a venture partner with Rho Ventures focusing on investments in new media. He was also the chairman of the board of directors for Everyday Health and LIN Media and was the former president and CEO of Lifetime Entertainment Services, the parent company of Lifetime Television Networks and the former chairman and CEO of iVillage.

== Early life and education ==
Born in 1949, in New York City, Douglas (Doug) W. McCormick, grew up in suburban Garden City, New York, where he attended St. Joseph’s School. He graduated from Garden City High School (New York), where he was a frequent performer in school musicals. After a stint in the U.S. Merchant Marine, through the National Maritime Union, he attended the University of Dayton to pursue a degree in Chemistry, but later changed his major. He received a Bachelor of Science degree in Speech and Communication Arts in 1970, completing the degree in three years. He later earned a Master of Business Administration from Columbia Business School.

== Early career ==
McCormick began his media career while attending the University of Dayton as a radio announcer at WPFB in Middletown, Ohio, and later as a production team member of the “floor crew” at CBS affiliate WHIO-TV. After graduating in 1970 in three years from the University of Dayton, he joined TeleRep Inc., a TV Station Representative firm in NYC, and thereafter went to their flagship station, KCOP-TV in Los Angeles, as a local salesman. In 1973, he joined Petry Television in their Los Angeles sales office, and then moved to its New York office. In 1982, he became vice president of sales and marketing for the then fledgling Cable Health Network, a Viacom company, where he worked on the launch of the Professional Program Service, a precursor to Lifetime Medical Television, and negotiated the very first prescription drug advertising commercial contract to be telecast on U.S. television. In 1985, Samuel Goldwyn Television recruited him to head up their newly formed advertiser-supported programming division where he also sold theatrical film packages to U.S. television stations.

== Lifetime Television Highlights 1986-1998 ==
McCormick rejoined Lifetime Television in 1986, where, through a series of promotions, ultimately became Lifetime’s president and CEO in 1993. McCormick dropped Lifetime Medical Television and turned Lifetime into a seven-day brand name network. In 1994, he overhauled network programming, appointing Judy Girard as senior vice president of programming to fill the vacancy left by Patricia Fili-Krushel. That same year he made significant brand changes by creating the network positioning, “Television for Women”, putting Lifetime “on the map” as the first and dominant women’s programming channel. Among milestones achieved during his years as Lifetime CEO, he launched the Intimate Portrait (TV series) and brought the WNBA to Lifetime. During his tenure as CEO, Lifetime gained national prominence for sponsoring and creating programming for the all-women’s team in the America’s Cup, expanded the Lifetime Original Movies to a monthly franchise and launched a slate of original series dealing with important topics such as racism and single parenthood - all gaining Emmy award attention for Lifetime. He is also credited with conceiving and launching Lifetime Movie Network in 1998. McCormick earned a reputation as a leader in women’s community and cause-related marketing by fostering programming and social awareness dedicated to breast cancer, gaining support from the Ms. Foundation for Women, Senator Bill Bradley and former first lady at the time, Hillary Clinton. At the end of his tenure, Lifetime was rated the number one cable network among women aged 18 to 49 in both prime time and total-day viewing. McCormick is credited with growing Lifetime to the 9th most profitable cable and broadcast network in the U.S., worth more than $3 billion by the time he left the company.

== iVillage Highlights 1999-2006 ==
Initially a member of iVillage’s board of directors, McCormick was later named president and, ultimately, chairman and CEO after leaving Lifetime. iVillage, he engineered the successful merger of two public companies — iVillage and Women.com Networks — creating the leading online media company for women. Following that transaction in June 2004, McCormick led a successful secondary share offering, raising more than $75 million. Under his management, iVillage assets grew with the launch of iVillage Health Network, Baby Steps Magazine, and a deal with British retail giant Tesco to launch iVillage in the U.K., as well as a profitable subscription-based Newborn Channel for hospitals. McCormick completed seven subsequent acquisitions, building iVillage into a profitable, leading Internet property. He managed the successful sale of iVillage to NBC Universal in 2006 for $611 million.

== Other business activities ==
McCormick was chairman of the board to Everyday Health, currently the largest venture-backed digital media company in New York, and LIN Media, a multimedia company comprising 43 television stations, 7 digital channels and other media properties, as well as vice chairman of the executive committee at Reelz Channel. He was a board member of and investor in Ovation TV, StyleCaster and Precision Demand and former board member of CBS Marketwatch (MKTW), Pump Audio and Wayport, Inc. McCormick was also president of The Cancer Prevention and Treatment Fund, associated with NewYork–Presbyterian Hospital and a trustee of the American Management Association. Previously, McCormick served as chairman of the International Radio and Television Society (IRTS) and the Cabletelevision Advertising Bureau (CAB), a board member to the Online Publishers Association, the Walter Kaitz Foundation and Cable in the Classroom, as well as an advisory board member to the initial Ms. Foundation for Women Take our Daughters to Work Day.

== Music ==
During the early 1970s, McCormick pursued his musical career after work, performing in New York nightclubs such as J.P.’s, Trax and Reno Sweeny. He took a break from corporate life after being discovered at Reno’s by Charles Koppelman, president of The Entertainment Company, who signed McCormick to a songwriting contract. McCormick collaborated with Paul Anka on “Brought Up in New York” from Anka’s Listen To Your Heart album on the RCA Records label. Other artists’ recordings of McCormick songs include Dusty Springfield, “Get Yourself To Love”, Gladys Knight and Brazil’s Roberto Carlos.

== Awards and achievements ==
McCormick garnered numerous business and humanitarian awards. In 2014, he was awarded the Ellis Island Medal of Honor by the National Ethnic Coalition of Organizations. In 2002, he was presented with the Cancer Research and Treatment Fund Humanitarian Award. He was named to Crain’s NY Tech 100 in 2001. In 1998, he was honored by the Child Care Action Campaign while Lifetime received the 1998 Caring Corporation Award that same year. In 1997, the National Women's Political Caucus awarded McCormick the Good Guy Award, and he received the New York Women's Agenda Honorable MEN-tion Award, as well as in conjunction with Lifetime, he received the Corporate Leadership Award from the National Breast Cancer Coalition. Also in 1997, the Fight Against Breast Cancer campaign which McCormick established at Lifetime garnered a CableAce Award (the cable industry’s highest honor), along with five other Ace Awards for programming. Girls Inc. recognized him in 1996 and he received the president’s award from the Cable Television Public Affairs Association (CTPAA) in 1995.
