= David A. Hirsch =

- Born: David Allan Hirsch; October 26, 1960 (age 66); Chicago, Illinois, U.S.
- Education: University of Illinois Urbana-Champaign Northwestern University
- Spouse: Margaret M. Hirsch (m. 1983)
- Children: 5 (2 sons and 3 daughters)

David A. Hirsch (born October 26, 1960) is an American businessman, fatherhood activist, philanthropist, endurance cyclist, and author. In 1997, Hirsch founded the Illinois Fatherhood Initiative, a non-profit fatherhood Advocacy group. In 2015 he founded the 21st Century Dads Foundation which include programs like the Special Fathers Network, a mentoring program for more than 900 fathers raising children with special needs. He is the author of Dads Raising Children with Special Needs & Disabilities: A Guide for 21st Century Dads as well as 21st Century Dads: A Father’s Journey To Break The Cycle Of Father Absence and the host the Special Fathers Network Dad to Dad Podcast with over 425 episodes including guests: Joe Mantegna, Dick Hoyt, John Crowley (biotech executive), Major General IDF (ret.) Doron Almog, Warren S. Rustand, Azim Khamisa, Jim Stovall, Bill Strickland, Kalman Samuels, Bonner Paddock, Dr. Temple Grandin, Tom Dreesen, Jesse White, Frank McKinney, and Major General USAF (ret) John L. Borling, Matt Might, Rob Floyd, and John O’Leary.

== Biography ==
=== Education ===
Hirsch grew up in Morton Grove, Illinois and attended Niles West High School and graduated from Barrington High School. He attended the University of Illinois at Urbana-Champaign earning a Bachelor of Science degree in Accounting. As an undergraduate, Hirsch was president of the local Theta Xi chapter and a member of the Grand Lodge. Upon graduation he continued with the fraternity as alumni treasurer and the fraternity’s first National Service Project Chairman. He also received the Theta Xi National Fraternity Man of Distinction Award.

Hirsch received his Certified Public Accountant (CPA) designation in 1982, and later attended the Kellogg Graduate School of Management at Northwestern University and earned a Masters of Business Administration in marketing. He is also a graduate of the IMCA Chartered Private Wealth Management Program at the University of Chicago and the Certified Investment Management Analyst Program at University of Pennsylvania’s Wharton School of Business.

== Career ==
In 1982 Hirsch began his professional career as a CPA, auditor and then tax accountant with PricewaterhouseCoopers in Chicago. He later worked for Smith-Barney (1985-2007) and Credit Suisse (2008-2015), before joining UBS Financial Services in 2016.

== Awards and recognitions ==
- National Ethnic Coalition Organization (NECO), Ellis Island Medal of Honor, 2012
- Theta Xi National Fraternity, Man of Distinction Award, 2009
- Illinois Fatherhood Initiative, Honorary Father Of The Year, 2007
- Illinois CPA Society, Distinguished Service Award, 2005
- U.S. Department of Education, John Stanford Education Heroes Award, 2000
- Registered Representative Magazine, Outstanding Broker, 1995
- Crain’s Chicago Business, 40 Under 40, 1994

== Publications ==
- Dads Raising Children with Special Needs & Disabilities: A Guide for 21st Century Dads. Transformation Media Books (2026), ISBN 978-1-956897-79-1
- 21st Century Dads: A Fathers Journey To Break The Cycle Of Father Absence. Saint Louis: Transformation Media Books (2016), ISBN 978-1-941799-35-2 (with John St Augustine)
- A Case For Collapsing Private Foundations, Investments & Wealth Monitor, January/February 2012
