= IQAN =

Electronic control systems trademark

IQAN is a trademark for electronic control systems for mobile machinery, owned by Parker Hannifin corporation.

== History ==
The CAN bus based system IQAN was developed by a small Swedish company around 1990-95. First version was introduced on the market 1995. Shortly after, around 1995 the Swedish company VOAC Hydraulics Co. bought this company and in February 1996 VOAC Hydraulics was acquired by Parker Hannifin. The IQAN-system was integrated into Parkers product range of system components for mobile machinery. The system has been further developed within the Parker organization.

IQAN 4.0 was released approximately 2015

IQAN 5.0 was released approximately 2017

IQAN 6.0 was released October 7th, 2019

IQAN 7.0 was released October 8th, 2023

== Current ==
With the release of the new XC I/O modules, users now have more I/O options. The development system IQANdesign is now at version 7.02. An active user forum is present at https://forum.iqan.se/

== Sources ==
- VOAC history. VOAC Co., no longer existing company, is an acronym för Volvo-Atlas Copco as well as a trademark, USPTO registration No. 1828046, date March 29, 1994.
