= Chris McCarthy =

Chris McCarthy may refer to:

- Chris McCarthy (racewalker), American racewalker
- Chris McCarthy (executive), American media executive
