= Lord Corporation =

US manufacturing company

LORD Corporation
- Type: Subsidiary
- Industry: Transportation: Automotive, Electric Vehicles, Rail, Truck/Bus, Agriculture and Recreational and Marine. Aerospace and Defense: Commercial and Private Aircraft, Military Aircraft, Missile Systems and Tanks and Artillery. Manufacturing: Industrial Assembly and Process Industries. Construction: Civil Engineering and Off-Highway Vehicles. Electronics: Chip Assembly and Component Assembly
- Founded: 1924; 102 years ago
- Founder: Hugh C. Lord
- Headquarters: Cary, North Carolina, United States
- Area served: LORD Corporation had employees in 26 countries and operates 19 manufacturing facilities and 10 R&D centers worldwide. Australia, Brazil, China, France, Germany, Hong Kong, India, Israel, Italy, Japan, Korea, Malaysia, Mexico, Netherlands, Poland, Singapore, Slovakia, Spain, Sweden, Switzerland, Taiwan, Thailand, Turkey, United Kingdom and United States.
- Key people: Edward L. Auslander, President, CEO and General; James F. Amos, Retired, Chairman of the LORD Corporation Board of Directors
- Products: Adhesives, Coatings, Specialty Chemicals, Electronic Materials, Vibration & Motion Control and Magneto-Rheological (MR) fluids
- Number of employees: c. 3,100
- Parent: Parker Hannifin
- Website: lord.com

LORD Corporation is a diversified technology and manufacturing company that develops adhesives, coatings, motion management devices, and sensing technologies for industries such as aerospace, automotive, oil and gas, and industrial. With world headquarters in Cary, North Carolina, LORD has approximately 3,100 employees in 26 countries and operates 19 manufacturing facilities and 10 R&D centers worldwide. As of October 30, 2019, the company has been acquired by Parker Hannifin.

== History ==
In 1919, Hugh C. Lord, a patent attorney in Erie, Pennsylvania, began exploring the potential of bonding rubber-to-metal to isolate and control shock, noise and vibration. This led to the founding of the LORD Corporation, in addition to inventions such as chemical formulations, bonding processes, elastomers, adhesives, coatings and bonded elastomer assemblies. During the 1920s, General Electric used LORD manufactured mounts for trolley cars. Lincoln and Nash Motors automobiles also began to use LORD engine mountings. LORD was trademarked, leading to the creation of the LORD Manufacturing Company. The company's instrument panel mounts were also used by airplane manufacturers in order to lengthen service life.

In the 1940s, the LORD Manufacturing Company was incorporated. The company would supply engine mounts to many aircraft manufacturers. Mountings for railroad cars and buses were manufactured and LORD produced the first ever elastomeric transmission parts and engine isolators(also known as bushings) for helicopters. Elastomeric compounds are also developed by LORD as substitutes for natural rubber for the Korean War in the 1950s. To isolate aircraft cowlings, cowl mountings and motor-nose supports were manufactured. LORD developed the outboard motor mounting for the marine industry, Chemlok adhesives, and the snubbing skirt mounting for heavy equipment installations.

Following Hugh Lord's death in 1952, his son Thomas took over the company, and continued to run it until his own death in 1989.

During the 1960s —

- LORD built a facility in Saegertown, Pennsylvania to manufacture Chemlok adhesives and Chemglaze coating.
- LORD Manufacturing Company changed to LORD Corporation, the Cambridge Springs, Pennsylvania Plant opened for production of bonded rubber assemblies, a manufacturing plant opened in Bowling Green, Kentucky and LORD Corporation Europe was established.
- LORD established LORD Industrial LTDA in Jundiaí-SP, Brazil. The company created a joint venture in Zama, Japan to manufacture Chemlok, which led to the development of LORD Far East, Inc. LORD built a new corporate headquarters in Erie, Pennsylvania.
- LORD designed and produced its first elastomeric damper. The gimbal ring mount and the elastomeric bearing for helicopters was developed.

In the 1970s —

- LORD and Bell Helicopter designed elastomeric elements for the nodal beam pylon isolation system.
- LORD established LORD Industrial LTDA in São Paulo, Brazil.
- LORD opened manufacturing plant in Bowling Green, Kentucky.
- Fusor epoxy adhesive and Versilok acrylic adhesive trademarks were adopted.
- Ultra Violet/Electronic Beam (UV/EB) cure coatings and laminating adhesive trademarks were adopted.

During the 1980s —

- LORD Mechanical Products Division acquired a machining center in Dayton, Ohio.
- Environmentally friendly aqueous adhesives were developed.
- LORD Europe began producing industrial and aerospace products.
- LORD Korea was formed to produce Chemlok.
- LORD Aerospace Products began to develop elastomeric bearings for a Navy aircraft.
- LORD de Mexico was formed.
- LORD Societe Anonyme was established in France and LORD Far East relocated to Kofu, Japan.
- LORD Euromech and LORD U.K. merged to become LORD Corporation Europe in the 1990s.
- Liofol Company, a venture between LORD and Henkel Germany was formed.
- Shanghai LORD first marketed and produced Chemlok.
- Rheonetic trademark for magneto-rheological devices was adopted.
- LORD moved headquarters to Cary, North Carolina.
- LORD purchased Burke Palmason Chemical Company, Mavidon Corporation and Castall, Inc.
- Motion Master, LORD trademark for magneto-rheological seat damping systems was adopted.

In 2000, LORD Mechanical Shanghai was constructed. LORD Materials Division introduced a steer-by-wire solution for forklift trucks. BalaDyne Corporation was acquired and Active Balancing solutions for airplane propellers/rotating machinery was added to the product offering. Metal Gomma S.p.A. of Monzambano, Italy was purchased, which completed 100 percent ownership by LORD. Adoption of Rheonetic MR Fluids expanded into auto primary suspension systems. Company was realigned to combine Mechanical, Chemical and Material Product Divisions. The company announced a new distribution partnership with Tubelite Company Incorporated, headquartered in Apopka, Florida. The first MetalJacket corrosion control coating line was established. The company was globally unified under a single brand entity. LORD acquired Henkel's rubber-to-substrate bonding and rubber coating business assets. LORD teamed up with Biedermann Motech, a German manufacturer of spinal implants and prosthetic components, to produce a prosthetic device.

On April 29, 2019 it was announced that LORD Corporation would be acquired by Parker Hannifin for $3.675 billion. The sale was approved by the boards of each respective company and closed on October 30, 2019. More than $1 billion in proceeds from the sale were distributed to four foundations created by Thomas Lord, to benefit the Massachusetts Institute of Technology, the University of Southern California, Duke University, and the Cleveland Clinic, respectively. Each organization expects to receive approximately $260 million in unrestricted funding from the sale.

== Products ==
The product line today includes: Adhesives Coatings, Specialty Chemicals, Electronic Materials, Vibration & Motion Control, Magneto-Rheological (MR) fluids.

== Technologies ==
- Active Vibration Control (AVC) Systems: LORD AVC systems are used to minimize vibration and reduce weight in helicopters.
- Automotive Aftermarket Adhesives: LORD Fusor Automotive Aftermarket Adhesives are used to return vehicles to pre-accident condition. These adhesives are formulated to repair all types of automotive substrates. The LORD Fusor line includes adhesives for bonding, metals and plastics, seam sealers and acoustical foams.
- Balancing Systems: LORD balancing systems are designed to correct unbalance in rotating machinery while they are operating. LORD balancers monitor rotating imbalance and provide real-time corrections, diagnostic data and can operate during start-up and shut-down cycles.
- Corrosion Control Coatings: LORD Corporation's MetalJacket coating protects substrates against corrosion and improves bonding properties.
- Elastomer Bonding: LORD has a line of elastomer bonding formulations that can accommodate commercially available elastomers, diverse metals and rigid plastic substrates.
- Electronic Materials: LORD provides potting, coating and encapsulant solutions for electronic circuit assembly, as well as hybrid/component thick film materials, semiconductor packaging and thermal management materials.
- Fluid Vibration Isolation & Damping: Fluid systems can be used to isolate vibration at a particular frequency or improve damping at a particular frequency
- High Performance/Heat Reflective Coatings (HPC/HRC): LORD HPC/HRC provide high adhesion to underlying substrates and high mechanical properties (600% elongation). They allow the bulk of a part to be made with one material while a thin coating of high-performance/heat-reflective elastomer is added to the outside.
- Industrial Metal Bonding Adhesives: LORD adhesives can replace welds, rivets, screws, tape and other traditional fastening methods.
- MR Solutions: Magneto-rheological (MR) fluids reversibly and instantaneously change from a free-flowing liquid to a semi-solid with controllable yield strength when exposed to a magnetic field. LORD MR technology can be found in primary suspensions for automotive customers and is now being introduced for military applications.
