= Patrick S. Parker =

American businessman

Patrick Streeter Parker
- Born: October 16, 1929; Cleveland, Ohio, US
- Died: July 6, 2005 (aged 75); Cleveland Heights, Ohio, US
- Education: Williams College, Harvard Business School
- Occupation: Businessman
- Known for: Leader of Parker Hannifin Corporation
- Spouse: Madeleine H. Parker (nee Hornickel)
- Children: 6
- Parent(s): Arthur L. Parker and Helen Parker

Patrick "Pat" Streeter Parker (October 16, 1929 – July 6, 2005) was an American businessman who was chief executive officer of Parker Hannifin Corporation his family business from 1971 to 1983, a member of the board of directors from 1960 to 1999, and chairman from 1977 to 1999.

== Early life and education ==
Born in Cleveland, Parker was the son of Arthur L. and Helen Parker. Arthur L. Parker founded the Parker Pneumatic Truck Brake company in 1918, which later evolved into the Parker Appliance Company.

Parker attended University School and later went to Williams College where he received his B.A. degree. He later received his M.B.A. degree from the Harvard Business School.

=== United States Navy ===
Pat served in the U.S. Navy as a supply officer during the Korean War. His Officer Candidate School was at the U.S. Naval College in Newport, Rhode Island. Pat did a tour of duty on the USS Forrestal (CVA-59). In 1957, Pat completed his military duty and moved to California for a position with Parker Aircraft Co.

== Business career ==
At a company history presentation given in 1995 at the Euclid Avenue headquarters in Cleveland, Pat Parker said his father "dropped dead of a heart attack" in 1945 and left the entire business in the hands of his mother. "Many friends of the family advised her to sell but mom kept the business and later hired managers" to run it. Parker Appliance acquired the Hannifin Corporation in the late 1950s and for reasons of brand recognition renamed the business the Parker Hannifin Corporation. Throughout the period between World War II and his death, Pat Parker helped to build and expand Parker Hannifin to offer a wide array of hydraulic, pneumatic and electromechanical products, which gave Parker the position as a global leader in engineering. Now an $12.54 billion enterprise, the firm had annual sales of $197 million.

Most of Pat Parker's working career was with the company, starting from when he was a little boy. In 1960, Parker joined the board of directors of Parker Hannifin. He was president from 1968 and Chief Executive Officer from 1971 through 1983. He was named chairman in 1977, a position he retired from in 1999. He had previously retired as an employee in 1994.

He died from cancer at the age of 75 in July 2005.

== Honors and awards ==
He received many honors which include the International Executive of the Year, Certificate of Distinction for Executive Management, and he was inducted into the Hall of Fame for "Inside Business Magazine" in 2004.
