= Jacob Eapen =

American pediatrician

- Born: Thiruvananthapuram, Kerala, India
- Education: Trivandrum Medical College (MBBS); University of California, Berkeley (MPH)
- Occupation: Pediatrician
- Known for: President, Washington Township Health Care District Board of Directors
- Awards: Ellis Island Medal of Honor (2007)

Jacob Eapen is an American pediatrician based in Fremont, California. He has served as an elected member of the board of directors of the Washington Township Health Care District, which operates Washington Hospital in Fremont, since 2005, and was serving as board president in 2024. In 2007 he received the Ellis Island Medal of Honor, presented annually by the National Ethnic Coalition of Organizations.

== Early life and education ==
Eapen was born in Trivandrum (Thiruvananthapuram), in the Indian state of Kerala. He studied medicine at Trivandrum Medical College and completed postgraduate training in pediatrics at Christian Medical College, Ludhiana. He later earned a master's degree in public health from the University of California, Berkeley, in 1984, and spent five years working as a physician and teacher in Sub-Saharan Africa.

Hs African posts included work as a consultant pediatrician at the Aga Khan Hospital, Dar es Salaam in Tanzania and subsequently in Nigeria, and he later undertook a residency at Stanford University.

== Career ==
In 1990, the UNHCR appointed Eapen as a health adviser in the Philippines, where he was responsible for health services for roughly 40,000 Indochinese refugees at the Philippine Refugee Processing Center in Bataan. By 2007, he was practicing as a pediatrician in Newark, California, with Alameda County Health Services. He has previously served as a board member of the Association of California Healthcare Districts, as medical director of a local health care clinic, as Alameda County's public health commissioner, and as an adviser to Alameda County's Every Child Counts Commission. As of 2019, he was serving as a medical director of Alameda Health System, a position from which he had retired by 2025.

Eapen has served as an elected member of the Washington Township Health Care District board of directors, which governs Washington Hospital in Fremont, since at least 2007, and continued to serve on the board as of 2024–2025, including as board president in 2024 and as treasurer in other years.

In 2007, Eapen received the Ellis Island Medal of Honor. He was one of six Indian-American recipients that year, among 100 medal recipients overall. Rep. Fortney Pete Stark also acknowledged the award in the Congressional Record.
