= Wilson Ko =

American cardiothoracic surgeon

Wilson Ko, M.D. was an American cardiothoracic (heart and lung) surgeon practicing in New York City who was an Ellis Island Medal of Honor recipient in 2008. He has served as professor of surgery at the New York Medical College, State University of New York, Cornell University Medical College, and as the chief cardiothoracic surgeon at Saint Vincent Hospital-Manhattan, State University of New York Downstate Medical Center in Brooklyn, and New York Hospital Queens. His community services include serving as the president of Chinese American Medical Society, the president of China AIDS Fund (6), vice-chairman of the National Council of Asian Pacific Islander Physicians (7), board director in American Cancer Society-East Asian Unit, Chinese American Cardiovascular Association (8), and Chinatown Partnership Local Development Corporation (9). He was featured as one of the eight most influential Chinese Americans in the ViViD magazine (10) in 2011.

== Early life ==
Dr. Wilson Ko immigrated to San Francisco, California with his family at the age of 12, and was naturalized as a U.S. citizen at the age of 18. He was selected to San Francisco’s premiere public college preparatory Lowell High School, where he graduated in the top 1% of his class with Scroll Honorary distinction and achieved the highest scores for the advanced placement examinations in biology, chemistry, physics, and calculus. He attended University of California at Berkeley and graduated with distinct honor in biochemistry. This was followed by a medical degree from Chicago Medical School, where he graduated as valedictorian.

== Education ==
Ko underwent one of the most competitive postgraduate training in general surgery for five years under G. Tom Shires, M.D. in the prestigious New York Hospital—Cornell University Medical. During this training, he spent an additional two and a half years of cardiothoracic surgery research under Karl Krieger, M.D. During this time, he published 32 peer-reviewed scientific papers. He was then selected in an equally competitive and highly sought-after cardiothoracic surgery training program for the next two years also at New York Hospital—Cornell University Medical Center under the direction of O. Wayne Isom, M.D. Immediately after his surgical training, he was recruited to the Cornell faculty in the department of cardiothoracic surgery. In the ensuing 11 years, he was promoted from assistant to associate professor. He was a founder of a new Cornell satellite heart surgery program at New York Hospital of Queens, where he served as the director from 1999 to 2006. During his 20-year tenure at Cornell, he published over 45 peer-reviewed scientific papers, presented findings in numerous local, national, and international medical conferences, served as a frequent lecturer and visiting professor in addition to have developed a large clinical practice that is one of the busiest (400 to 625 major cases per year) in the New York metropolitan area.

In 2006, Ko was recruited to be the professor and chief of cardiothoracic surgery at the State University of New York—Downstate University Medical Center in Brooklyn, where he formed and presided a new multidisciplinary team with aims for a center of excellence. During this three-year tenure, he recruited a new team including two cardiothoracic surgeons, chief intensivist, chief physician assistant, chief perfusionist, nurse practitioners, data manager, researcher, and office staff; this team remains intact today. In this challenging institution, Dr. Ko revitalized clinical services, added new surgical programs, improved the training program of fellows, general surgery residents and medical students, and initiated research projects including one that was awarded NIH funding. In his departure, he was given the University President’s Best Teacher Award by the graduating class of over 1,000 residents, fellows, and students in 2009.

In 2009, Ko was recruited to form the new Department of Cardiothoracic Surgery and became its chairman at the St. Vincent Hospital Manhattan, a major teaching affiliate of New York Medical College where he is appointed Professor of Surgery The goal was to build a world-class cardiovascular center with the latest techniques and technology to serve the residents in the five boroughs of New York City. The new department was formed with 3 cardiac surgeons and 2 thoracic surgeons with case volume more than doubling over the first six months. Unfortunately, the hospital went into bankruptcy and closed in April 2010 due to a disastrous financial situation. Currently, he serves as attending cardiothoracic surgeon and the co-director of Asian Cardiac Center at Beth Israel Medical Center.

Ko had been a visiting professor in the First Municipal Hospital of Guangzhou (Canton, China) for three consecutive years, where he gave lectures and performed surgeries to demonstrate the modern American techniques in heart surgery. Subsequently, he had received surgeons from that hospital for advance training at New York Hospital of Queens. In August 2009, initial discussion has begun to consider a teaching interchange between St. Vincent Hospital Manhattan and First Affiliated Hospital of Guangzhou Medical College in China to form the first Minimally Invasive Cardiac Surgery Program in the city of Guangzhou serving 12 million residents.

He was active in serving the Chinese American Community in New York in multiple fronts. He served on the board of directors for eight years, and then acted as the treasurer, vice-president, and the president of the Chinese American Medical Society with over 1200 physician members. Through this New York based society, he has contributed to many community services such as health education seminars, regular health related articles in Chinese newspaper, and radio programs, press releases regarding urgent health issues. The society initiated “healthy heart” food education program for local restaurants, annual free flu vaccination, and financially supported many community based research programs related to hepatitis, metabolic syndrome, osteoporosis, HIV and others. He presided over ten scholarships and research grants for Chinese American medical students annually. He currently serves on the board of directors for the American Cancer Society—East Asian Unit based in Flushing, Queens Borough of New York City. The Unit serves as a community resource for education, healthcare referral, counseling, and cancer support groups. He led the Downstate Chinese American medical students to have the first free flu vaccine program in Brooklyn Chinatown in 2007 and now is an annual event.

He was the president of the China AIDS Fund, which had three successful fund raising galas in New York. The net proceeds of more than a quarter of a million dollars has funded local HIV related programs and more importantly has funded educational and support programs in China for orphans, pregnant women and alike. Since 2009, the fund built two Children Centers with libraries, computer facilities with full-time staff in administering various activities in Henan, China serving 400 HIV affected children (mostly orphans) in the neighboring villages.

He was a member and Fellow of the American College of Surgeons, Society of Thoracic Surgeons, American College of Cardiology, American Heart Association, American Medical Association, and the American College of Chest Physicians.

== Awards and achievements ==
For his academic and clinical achievements, he was consistently listed in the Castle Connolly Guide to New York Metro Area Top Doctors, and New York Magazine Best Doctors list. For his dedication to community and charitable work, he was awarded the prestigious Ellis Island Medal of Honor in 2008. In 2011, he was named among the "Top Eight Most Influential Chinese Americans" in the VIVD Magazine.

Dr. Ko passed away some time in 2014-2015 from lung cancer. The 2015 China AIDS Fund Gala published a tribute to Dr. Ko. http://www.chinaaidsfund.org/wp-content/uploads/2015/11/2015-Gala-Journal-Final-V09-low-res.pdf
