= S. K. Gupta =

Indian-American business executive

Sudhir k (better known as S. K. Gupta) is an Indian-American business executive.

== Education ==
In 1972 Gupta graduated from the DMET, Kolkata in India, now known as the Indian Maritime University. In 1981 he then graduated with a BSE degree in naval architecture and marine engineering from the University of Michigan. After this he graduated from an MBA at Seattle University.

== Career ==
=== Business career ===
Out of the University of Michigan Gupta started working for Designers and Planners Inc, before moving to Lockheed Martin in January 1982. He became manager of technical programs at Lockheed Shipbuilding Company by 1986. He has held technical and management assignments in engineering, business operations, business development, operations and program management on commercial, military and classified programs, including as the test director of the stealth ship Sea Shadow from 1988 to 1995. Prior to coming to the US, he served as chief engineer on merchant ships. Sudhir K. Gupta was the Vice President of Operations for Lockheed Martin Space Systems Company (SSC) from 2001 until 2011.

Gupta has been a member of the Board of Directors of Sandia National Laboratories. He was also on the Board of Directors for Lean Advancement Initiative consortium and a member of the Industry Advisory Board of Tauber Institute for Global Operations, University of Michigan, he also served Lockheed Martin’s Co-University Executive for University of Michigan. Gupta serves on the Senior Advisory Board of LMC Properties, Inc and was member of San Jose Museum of Arts’ Board of Trustees as well as a member of the Board of Directors of LEAP (Leadership Education for Asian Pacifics).

=== Public life ===
Gupta has previously served as a Bay Area Council Executive Committee member, and hosted both Executive Committee and Board of Directors meetings. On January 31, 2011, a member's resolution forwarded by California Assemblymen Bob Wieckowski and Paul Fong of the California State Assembly was passed on the Assembly floor upon the occasion of Gupta's retirement from the Lockheed Martin Space Systems Company. In it, they stated that Gupta had been a Bay Area Council Executive Committee member, on the board for the US Department of Energy's Sandia National Laboratories, and on the board of the San Jose Museum of Art.

Gupta was the Managing Director and Co-Founder of Ascend Pinnacle, the Asian American Corporate Directors Network, retiring in 2018 with over 200 experienced board directors as members. He served on the Board of Directors of APIA Scholars from 2014 to 2020.

== Recognition ==
In 1984 Gupta received the Lockheed Corporation’s Robert E. Gross Award as Engineer/Scientist of the Year for his stability studies on LSD-41 class ships. In February 2004, Gupta was honored by the Chinese Institute of Engineers USA, and received the Asian American Engineer of the Year Award. In 2010, he received the Ellis Island Medal of Honor. He is also the recipient of a Popular Mechanics design and engineering award and the Department of Defense Single Process Initiative Award.
