= WhoSay =

American social media platform

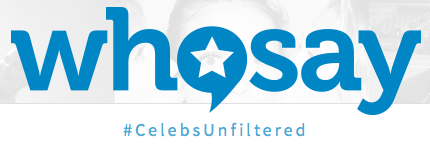
- Website type: Social networking service
- Founded: March 2010; 16 years ago
- Headquarters: New York City, New York, United States; Silicon Beach, Los Angeles, California, United States; London, England
- Area served: United States
- Owner: Paramount Skydance Corporation
- Key people: Steve Ellis (CEO); Rob Gregory (CRO)
- Industry: Internet
- Employees: 18
- Website: www.whosay.com
- Current status: Absorbed into Paramount Advertising

WhoSay was an American social media service and branding platform for celebrities and their fans. Founded in Los Angeles in 2010, with financing by Creative Artists Agency (CAA), Amazon.com and other investors, it is notable for allowing its users to retain ownership rights over the content that they post to their accounts, through copyright branding, and for enabling users to post content to other social media sites like Twitter, Facebook, Instagram and Tumblr simultaneously. WhoSay describes itself as a "social celebrity magazine" whose editorial team keeps its users informed about the latest celebrity and entertainment news.

Clients such as Dylan McDermott and Chris Rock lauded the service for its ability to add content to multiple social network sites easily. Rock in particular has commented on its ease of use for those who are not part of a tech-savvy demographic, commenting, "It's perfect for someone that's not 25."

WhoSay's competitors included theAudience, which is operated by the William Morris Endeavor.

== History ==
WhoSay was founded in March 2010, by Steve Ellis and the Los Angeles-based talent agency Creative Artists Agency (CAA). It was financed through investments Amazon.com (who along with CAA, holds a minority stake in the company), Comcast, Greylock Partners, and High Peak Ventures. The company's main headquarters are in The New York Times Building in Manhattan, with additional headquarters in CAA's office building in the Silicon Beach area of Los Angeles, and in London. The company was founded to protect celebrities' intellectual property and enable the celebrities themselves to profit themselves from their own content through copyright branding. Its chief executive is co-founder Steve Ellis, who, after leaving Getty Images, was contacted by CAA, who were looking to resolve the issue of celebrities losing the rights to their own photos and videos when uploading them to social network sites. Ellis explained WhoSay's mission thus: "We work with people who are constantly being utilized by third parties for the wrong reasons. [The company was formed] to give celebrities and other influential people a set of tools to allow them to manage and control their presence in the digital world." In this way, WhoSay is likened by Ellis to "a People magazine by the people themselves who are in it."

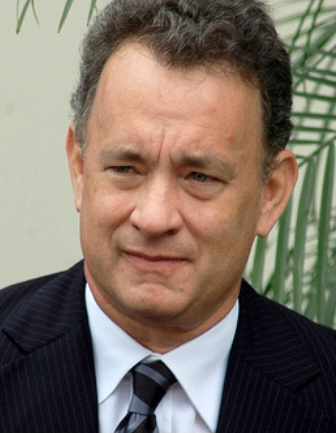
WhoSay's growth was slow until actor Tom Hanks joined it three months after its launch.

The company started slowly, until CAA client Tom Hanks signed onto WhoSay three months after the service's launch. The company continued to maintain a low profile for the first three years of operation, during which it accumulated a client list of 1,500 actors, musicians and artists. Clients are accepted by the service on an invitation-only basis, although they are not restricted to Creative Artists clients. Among them are Kelly Clarkson, Julia Louis-Dreyfus, Paula Patton, Kevin Spacey, Jim Carrey, John Cusack, Bill Maher, Johnny Knoxville, Chelsea Handler, Eva Longoria, Spike Lee, Enrique Iglesias and Katie Couric. Clients are not charged for the service, and are given a share of any revenue that is generated by advertisements. They are also given the ability share in the database of e-mail addresses that come with registration, in order to communicate directly with fans. Actor Dylan McDermott was introduced to WhoSay by his agent, as a way of easily posting content to Facebook, Twitter, Tumblr and even China's Tencent social network with relative ease. McDermott comments, "When you put something out there, you can hit everything at one time. It makes it easy for me." Comedian Chris Rock has commented that WhoSay is ideal for people like him have developed difficulty in keeping track of different websites as they get older, saying, "It's perfect for someone that's not 25."

In September 2013 WhoSay introduced a mobile application for consumers. By October 2013, the company's website attracted 12 million monthly visitors.

In July 2014 Rob Gregory left his role as president of Newsweek's The Daily Beast to become WhoSay's chief revenue officer. Among his responsibilities are developing ways to monetize WhoSay's web and mobile products, such as premium advertising strategies and brand partnerships.

WhoSay does not allow consumers to create accounts, nor does it include search features, making it difficult to access a celebrity's account unless a user is directed there from one of their other social pages. According to Ellis, consumers have enough social media choices, saying, "Frankly they don't really need the services that we provide, and there are a lot of very specific features built into our service that really only benefit someone who is of a high profile."

By February 2015, WhoSay had amassed 4.8 million unique users, and expanded its accounts to companies that employ celebrities for branded content. Such companies include Lexus, which partnered with the company to promote a campaign in which actress Rosario Dawson, during the lead up to the 87th Academy Awards, released five short videos on her social media accounts. The videos feature her driving through Los Angeles in preparation for the grand opening of her pop-up store, which sells Studio One Eighty Nine, a clothing line tied to her foundation promoting African culture and content. That April, WhoSay partnered with Chevrolet's #BestDayEver social media campaign for April Fool's Day, enlisting Olivia Wilde, Norman Reedus, Alec Baldwin, Ian Somerhalder, and Nikki Reed to surprise students in four U.S. classrooms as their substitute teachers. For example, Baldwin, dressed as Abraham Lincoln, surprised students in an Occidental College class on U.S. Culture and Society. Other companies that WhoSay has partnered with include KFC, JCPenney, Dunkin' Donuts and Crest.

In January 2018, the website was acquired by Viacom (now Paramount Global).
