= Steven Mandis =

American investment banker

Steven George Mandis
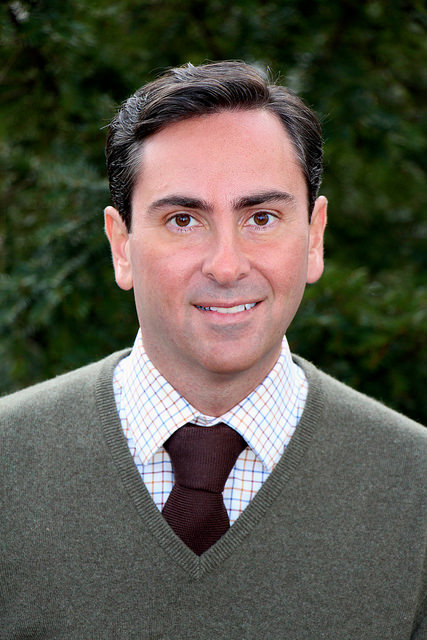
- Born: 1970 (age 55–56); Chicago, Illinois
- Education: University of Chicago; Columbia University
- Occupations: Investor and business executive
- Notable work: What Happened to Goldman Sachs; The Real Madrid Way; What Happened to Serie A
- Awards: Ellis Island Medal of Honor

Steven George Mandis (born in 1970) is an American investor and the founder of Kalamata Capital. He is an adjunct associate professor in finance and economics at Columbia University Business School. Previously, he worked at Goldman Sachs and Citigroup and as a senior advisor to McKinsey. He is the author of three books: What Happened to Goldman Sachs: An Insider's Story of Organizational Drift and its Unintended Consequences, The Real Madrid Way: How Values Created the Most Successful Sports Team on the Planet, and What Happened to Serie A: The Rise, Fall and Signs of Revival.

== Early life and education ==
Mandis was born in Chicago, Illinois as one of three children to his parents, Greek emigres George and Theoni. He spent his childhood in Chicago and Grand Rapids, Michigan where he attended Forest Hills Central High School. In 1992 he received an A.B. from the University of Chicago. After a 16-year career on Wall Street he enrolled at Columbia University, where he received an M.A. in Museum Anthropology in 2010, and an MPhil in Sociology in 2013, and a Ph.D. in Sociology.

== Business career ==
Mandis began his career at Goldman Sachs in 1992 as a mergers-and-acquisitions banker. He later joined the proprietary trading department, where he helped build the Special Situations Proprietary Trading Group (SSG) and worked under Henry Paulson.

In 2004 Mandis left Goldman to join Halcyon Structured Asset Management, an alternative asset management company. He remained at Halcyon until 2008, and later worked as a senior advisor to McKinsey & Company. He then worked as an executive at Citigroup in various roles including chief of staff to its president.

In 2013 Mandis founded Kalamata Capital, a small business finance company that he funded with his own money, naming it after the area of Greece his parents are from.

Since leaving Wall Street in 2012, Mandis has taught at Columbia Business School as an adjunct professor.

== Books ==
In 2013 Mandis's book What Happened to Goldman Sachs: An Insider’s Story of Organizational Drift and its Unintended Consequences was published by Harvard Business Press, based upon his PhD dissertation at Columbia. It won the 2014 Gold Axiom Business Book Award for Corporate History.

In 2016 Mandis's book The Real Madrid Way: How Values Created the Most Successful Sports Team on the Planet was published by BenBella Books. The book was the subject of a documentary by BBC Radio World Service, and won the 2017 International Book Award for Sports.

In 2018 Mandis's book What Happened to Serie A: The Rise, Fall and Signs of Revival, a history of the Serie A Italian professional football league, was published by Arena Sport.

== Personal life ==
Mandis lives in New York City. He was awarded an Ellis Island Medal of Honor in 2012.
