= Gwendolyn Calvert Baker =

American educator and activist (1931–2019)

- Born: Gwendolyn Calvert; December 31, 1931; Ann Arbor, Michigan
- Died: March 7, 2019 (aged 87); Sarasota, Florida
- Education: University of Michigan
- Known for: Educator, activist, and nonprofit executive

Gwendolyn Calvert Baker (December 31, 1931 – March 7, 2019) was an educator, activist, and nonprofit executive. Positions included being the National Executive Director of the YWCA, a member of the New York School Board, and president and CEO of UNICEF.

== Early life and education ==
Gwendolyn Calvert was born December 31, 1931, in Ann Arbor, Michigan, to Burgess Edward Calvert and Viola Lee Calvert. She was the oldest of five children. Burgess Calvert was an automobile assembly-line worker who created a successful trash-carting business.

Baker graduated from Ann Arbor High School and enrolled at the University of Michigan. She left during her freshman year after marrying and becoming pregnant.

Baker re-enrolled at the University of Michigan to become a teacher. She earned a bachelor of arts degree in elementary education in 1964. She began her teaching career at Wines Elementary, and taught for five years. She then earned her master's degree in educational administration in 1968 and her doctorate in curriculum and instruction in 1972. Her dissertation was on the effects of training in multi-ethnic education.

== Career in education ==
Baker joined the faculty at the University of Michigan in 1969. She helped develop one of the first multicultural education programs in the United States. In 1976, Baker became the director of Affirmative Action Programs.

Baker took leave from the University of Michigan in 1978 and moved to Washington, D.C. where she served as chief of the Minorities and Women 's Program with the National Institute of Education of the United States Department of Education under the Carter Administration.

In 1981, Baker moved to New York City to join the Bank Street College of Education as the vice president and dean of the Graduate and Children's Programs Division. That year, she co-founded the New York Alliance of Black School Educators.

== Career in nonprofits ==
In 1984, Baker became the National Executive Director of the YWCA. The organization had low membership and staff morale, so she worked to streamline the staff's work. Baker computerized operations, commissioned a study on how to save money, and focused marketing efforts on the YWCA's role as an advocate for women and people of color. Baker launched "Project Redesign" to restructure the organization and cut expenses by 45 percent in her first year while increasing programs.

In 1986, David Dinkins appointed Baker to the New York School Board. In 1990, she convinced the board to adopt its first affirmative action plan. Baker also became the first African American to serve as president in 1990. However, her authority was challenged by anonymous sources in the New York Times which accused her of being "indecisive, unable to mold an effective majority of the Board of Education, and autocratic." Tensions became more public when four members voted to re-hire the counsel that Baker had fired. Baker was also still working full-time at the YWCA, which required her to split her time among the organizations. After only a year in the position, she resigned "For the sake of unity of the Board and the education of our (already) short-changed children."

In 1993, Baker became president and CEO of the U.S. Committee for UNICEF with the goal of focusing UNICEF's work on education. She was the first African American and second woman in the position. Baker introduced UNICEF Month, expanding the"Trick-o-Treat for UNICEF" campaign to the full month of October. Under her leadership, UNICEF partnered with The Atlanta Committee for the Olympic Games, helping children in fourteen war-torn countries on the occasion of the Centennial Olympic Games in Atlanta. She retired in 1996.

In 1995, Baker was elected to join the U.S. Olympic Committee, which she served on until 2000. In her retirement, she also served on the boards of the Howard Gilman Foundation, and the American Educational Research Association (AERA).

Baker founded and became president of Calvert Baker & Associates, an educational consulting firm specializing in global education.

Baker also served on the boards of the United Nations Development Corporation, the New York Women's Forum, Inc., the Overseas Development Council, the International Development Conference, Recruiting New Teachers, and the Greater New York Savings Bank.

== Personal life ==
Baker married her high school sweetheart James Grady Baker in 1950. She and Baker had three children together and divorced in 1978.

Baker was a member of the Ann Arbor chapter of Alpha Kappa Alpha and founder of the Ann Arbor chapter of The Links.

Baker died on March 7, 2019 in Sarasota, Florida.

== Select publications ==
- Baker, Gwendolyn Calvert (1982), Planning and Organizing for Multicultural Instruction (1st ed.)
- Baker, Gwendolyn Calvert (1983), Planning and Organizing for Multicultural Instruction (2nd ed.), Addison Wesley Publishing Company
- Baker, Gwendolyn Calvert (1994), Planning and Organizing for Multicultural Instruction (Revised ed.), Addison Wesley Publishing Company
- Baker, Gwendolyn Calvert (Fall 1994), "Teaching Children to Respect Diversity.", Childhood Education, vol. 71, no. 1, pp. 33–35
- Baker, Gwendolyn Calvert (November 2014), Hot Fudge Sundae in a White Paper Cup: A Spirited Black Woman in a White World, University of Michigan Press, doi:10.3998/mpub.6974801, ISBN 978-0-472-07237-8

== Awards ==
- 1985: Willystine Goodsell Award, American Educational Research Association and Women's Education
- 1985: Old Masters Award, Purdue University
- 1986: Dollars and Sense Award
- 1987: Distinguished alumna, University of Michigan Education Alumni Society
- 1989: Strength of the City Award, New York Women's Forum, Inc.,
- 1990: Honorary degree, Medgar Evers College
- 1990: Honorary degree, King's College (Pennsylvania)
- 1991: First Tribute to Excellence in Education Award
- 1992: New York Alliance of Black School Educators created a college scholarship named after Baker.
- 1993: 10 most admired women managers in America, Working Woman
- 1994: Honorary degree, Fairleigh Dickinson University
- 1994: Featured on Alpha Kappa Alpha's Trailblazers' Poster in honor of Black History and Women's History months
- 1994: Spirit of the City Award-Global leadership for the 21st century, Cathedral of St. John the Divine
- 1995: Ellis Island Medal of Honor
- 1995: Honorary degree, Chicago State University
- 1997: Honorary law degree, University of Michigan
- 2014: Gwendolyn Calvert Baker Collegiate Professorship of American Culture and Screen Arts established at the University of Michigan
- Leadership in Action Award, Women's Action Alliance
