= Mehra Golshan =

American breast cancer surgeon

- Education: Case Western Reserve University School of Medicine (MD) MIT Sloan School of Management (MBA)
- Occupations: Cancer surgeon, academic, researcher
- Known for: Research in breast cancer treatment (reducing repeat surgeries)
- Awards: Ellis Island Medal of Honor (2025)

Mehra Golshan is an American cancer surgeon, academic, and medical researcher in breast cancer treatment. He was born in New Rochelle, New York, and is married to Dr. Parisa Lofti at Yale School of Medicine and has two sons. He currently serves as the Deputy Chief Medical Officer for Surgical Services at Smilow Cancer Hospital and Yale Cancer Center. Dr. Golshan is also the Executive Vice Chair of Operations in the Department of Surgery and a Professor of Surgical Oncology at the Yale School of Medicine. He was awarded the Ellis Island Medal of Honor from the Ellis Island Honors Society on May 10, 2025 for his contributions to oncology research, medicine, and patient care.

== Education ==
Dr. Golshan completed his medical degree at Case Western Reserve University School of Medicine. He completed a fellowship in breast surgical oncology at Northwestern Memorial Hospital and later earned an MBA from the Massachusetts Institute of Technology (MIT) Sloan School of Management.

== Career ==
Before joining Yale, Dr. Golshan held leadership roles at Brigham and Women's Hospital and Dana-Farber Cancer Institute. He was the inaugural holder of the Dr. Abdul Mohsen and Sultana Al-Tuwaijri Distinguished Chair in Surgical Oncology. In addition, he directed the Breast Surgical Oncology Fellowship—a joint program between Dana-Farber, Brigham and Women's Hospital, and Massachusetts General Hospital—and served on the faculty at Harvard Medical School as an Associate Professor of Surgery.

=== Academic and Professional Leadership ===
Dr. Golshan has mentored over 100 breast surgical fellows and international surgeons. At the Yale School of Medicine, he served as interim Vice Chair of Education in the Department of Surgery and he currently serves as the Deputy Chief Medical Officer for Surgical Services in the Yale Department of Surgery.

He is involved in several professional organizations, including serving as a Board Member of the National Accreditation Program for Breast Centers (NAPBC), Chair of the NAPBC Education Committee, Chair of the American College of Surgeons Committee on Interprofessional Education and Practice, and Commissioner for the Commission on Accreditation of Allied Health Education Programs. He is also a member on the MIT Sloan Alumni Board.

Dr. Golshan was also recently inducted into the American Surgical Association. Membership in the American Surgical Association (ASA) is selective, recognizing surgeons with national leadership roles in major surgical organizations and contributions to the field. Candidates are nominated and evaluated by an advisory membership committee.

In 2026, the Lindner Family made a $1.1 million gift to the Yale School of Medicine Department of Surgery and its Divisions of Surgical Oncology and Plastic and Reconstructive Surgery in recognition of the care provided by Dr. Mehra Golshan and Dr. Siba Haykal; the gift supports breast cancer clinical care, reconstruction, research, and education.

== Research ==
Dr. Golshan has authored more than 150 peer-reviewed publications and has served as principal investigator for a number of clinical trials, including early-phase and Phase III studies. His research focuses on reducing the need for additional surgical procedures in breast cancer treatment and has received support from the National Institutes of Health and the Breast Cancer Research Foundation.

He has investigated the use of intraoperative imaging and molecular tools, including magnetic resonance imaging (MRI) and mass spectrometry, to improve surgical accuracy and outcome.

Dr. Golshan has been featured on ABC News, CNN, and The New York Times on topics ranging from prophylactic mastectomies to breast screening guidelines. He has also written articles for Time on early breast cancer treatment.

== Awards ==
- Ellis Island Medal of Honor (2025)
