= Ellis Island Medal of Honor =

- Awarded for: Individuals who have made it their mission to share with those less fortunate, their wealth of knowledge, indomitable courage, boundless compassion, unique talents and selfless generosity. They do so while acknowledging their debt to their ethnic heritage as they uphold the ideals and spirit of America.
- Location: Ellis Island
- Country: United States
- Presented by: Ellis Island Honors Society (EIHS)
- First award: 1986
- Website: www.eihonors.org
- Ribbon of the medal

The Ellis Island Medal of Honor is an American award founded by the Ellis Island Honors Society (EIHS) (formerly known as the National Ethnic Coalition of Organizations (NECO)), which is presented annually to American citizens, both native-born and naturalized.

The Medal recognizes — in the organization's words —

individuals who have made it their mission to share with those less fortunate, their wealth of knowledge, indomitable courage, boundless compassion, unique talents and selfless generosity. They do so while acknowledging their debt to their ethnic heritage as they uphold the ideals and spirit of America.

Past medalists include U.S. presidents, world leaders, Nobel Prize winners, and other leaders of industry, education, the arts, sports and government, along with everyday Americans.

== Process ==
EIHS was founded in 1984, and the medals were established in 1986. A ceremony is held each May on Ellis Island. All branches of the United States Armed Forces traditionally participate. Both the United States House of Representatives and United States Senate have officially recognized the Ellis Island Medals of Honor, and each year's recipients are read into the Congressional Record. The Ellis Island's Great Hall where immigrants were once processed hosts the gala dinner and ceremony. Approximately 100 medalists are honored each year.

== Notable medalists ==
Notable medalists include:

- Spencer Abraham
- Gary Ackerman
- Shohreh Aghdashloo
- Danny Aiello
- Roger Ailes
- Muhammad Ali
- Madeleine Albright
- Shamsi Ali
- Michael W. Allen
- Goli Ameri
- Cyrus Amir-Mokri
- Ernie Anastos
- Abbas Ardehali
- Christopher Atamian
- Gjorgjija Atanasoski
- Igor Babailov
- Gwendolyn Calvert Baker
- Maria Bartiromo
- Ajaypal Singh Banga
- Yogi Berra
- David Hryck
- Nicolas Berggruen
- Brian Boitano
- Michael Bolton
- Matthew Bogdanos
- Victor Borge
- Ernest Borgnine
- Peter Boyer
- William Bratton
- Ian Bremmer
- Anita Bryant
- Dan Burton
- George H. W. Bush
- John J. Cali
- Keith Carradine
- Jimmy Carter
- Salvatore Cassano
- Bernadette Castro
- Sam Chang
- Elaine Chao
- Dominic Chianese
- Randolph Chitwood
- Sanjiv Chopra
- Mary Higgins Clark
- Bill Clinton
- Hillary Clinton
- Jerry Colangelo
- Claudette Colbert
- Natalie Cole
- Rita Cosby
- Brad Corbett
- Reza Dana
- Bruce DeMars
- Vince DeMentri
- Robert M. Devlin
- Wendy Diamond
- Joe DiMaggio
- Phil Donahue
- Kirk Douglas
- Michael Douglas
- Tom Dreesen
- Olympia Dukakis
- Tan Dun
- Victor Dzau
- Jacob Eapen
- Michael Eisner
- Alex Esclamado
- Emilio Estefan Jr.
- Gloria Estefan
- Omid Cameron Farokhzad
- Jamie Farr
- Mia Farrow
- Michael C. Finnegan
- Siegfried Fischbacher
- Michael Flatley
- Renée Fleming
- Gerald Ford
- Louis Freeh
- Joshua S. Friedman
- Valentín Fuster
- Paul G. Gaffney II
- Bill Gallo
- Henry Louis Gates Jr.
- Bob Gaudio
- Hossein Gharib
- Kathie Lee Gifford
- Ruth Bader Ginsburg
- Rudy Giuliani
- Salvatore Giunta
- Richard Greco Jr.
- Vartan Gregorian
- Peter Gruss
- Sudhir K. Gupta
- Alex Haley
- Adil Haider
- George Hamilton
- Helen Hayes
- David A. Hirsch
- Yumi Hogan
- Evander Holyfield
- Bob Hope
- Roy Horn
- Lee Iacocca
- Mike Ilitch
- Roy Innis
- Daniel Inouye
- Rahul M. Jindal
- Quincy Jones
- Yue-Sai Kan
- Casey Kasem
- Declan Kelly
- Anthony Kennedy
- Olga Kern
- Jeong H. Kim
- Coretta Scott King
- Henry Kissinger
- Gerda Weissmann Klein
- Wilson Ko
- Padma Lakshmi
- Ralph J. Lamberti
- Stewart F. Lane
- Tommy Lasorda
- Denis Leary
- Jerry Lewis
- Kenneth R. Leibler
- Robert Loggia
- Dave Longaberger
- Susan Lucci
- Howard Lutnick
- Oren Lyons
- Nigel Lythgoe
- Steven Mandis
- Salvatore R. Martoche
- Jamie Masada
- John McCain
- Linda McCartney
- Douglas Walter McCormick
- Bonnie McElveen-Hunter
- John McEnroe
- Gail J. McGovern
- Jim McGreevey
- John Mica
- Alan B. Miller
- Arturo Di Modica
- Hamid Moghadam
- Rita Moreno
- Angelo Mozilo
- John F. Mulholland Jr.
- Souhel Najjar
- Jacques Nasser
- Robert J. Natter
- Alex Navab
- Younes Nazarian
- Wayne Newton
- Richard Nixon
- Ronald Noble
- Michael Novak
- Denis O'Brien
- Sandra Day O'Connor
- John O'Hurley
- James P. O'Neill
- Raymond T. Odierno
- Kenneth Offit
- Edward James Olmos
- Jacqueline Kennedy Onassis
- Tony Orlando
- Mehmet Oz
- Fatih Ozmen
- Farah Pahlavi
- Arnold Palmer
- Lou Papan
- Rosa Parks
- Gregory Peck
- Carl Peterson
- Vanda Pignato
- Al Primo
- James Henry Quello
- Naeem Rahim
- Charles Rangel
- Sally Jessy Raphael
- Rachael Ray
- Ronald Reagan
- L. Rafael Reif
- Janet Reno
- William Rehnquist
- Mary Lou Retton
- Chita Rivera
- Mariano Rivera
- Doris Roberts
- Ahmadreza Rofougaran
- Ginni Rometty
- Ed Royce
- David Rubenstein
- Howard Safir
- Henry Samueli
- Harut Sassounian
- Telly Savalas
- Diane Sawyer
- Adam Schiff
- Eric Schmidt
- Martin Scorsese
- Rosanna Scotto
- Liev Schreiber
- Tamer Seckin
- Jane Seymour
- Brooke Shields
- Don Shula
- William E. Simon
- Paul Simon
- Frank Sinatra
- Fauja Singh
- Gary Sinise
- Paul Sorvino
- Alex Spanos
- Robert F. Spetzler
- George Steinbrenner
- Jerry Stiller
- Bert Sugar
- Elie Tahari
- Will Tanous
- Glover Teixeira
- Marlo Thomas
- Joe Torre
- Arthur Tracy
- Donald Trump
- George Uribe
- Dennis Vacco
- Frankie Valli
- Dick Vermeil
- Meredith Vieira
- Bobby Vinton
- Mike Wallace
- Eli Wallach
- Barbara Walters
- Dionne Warwick
- Donald E. Washkewicz
- Ruth Westheimer
- Elie Wiesel
- Andy Williams
- Siggi Wilzig
- Aldona Wos
- Chien-Shiung Wu
- Malala Yousafzai
- Tim Zagat
- Louis Zamperini
- Philip Zepter
- Mehra Golshan
