= Alex Esclamado =

Filipino-born American journalist

Alex Esclamado (April 2, 1929 – November 11, 2012) was a Filipino-born American newspaper publisher, lawyer, and journalist. In 1961, Esclamado founded the Philippine News out of his home in the Sunset District neighborhood of San Francisco, California. Esclamado became a vocal opponent of former Philippines President Ferdinand Marcos after his government declared martial law in 1972. Esclamado's decision to reject a $12 million bribe offered in exchange for the cessation of articles critical of Marcos resulted in the Philippine News losing the majority of its Philippines-based advertisers, a consequence that nearly resulted in bankruptcy for Esclamado.

== Awards and recognition ==
In October 1986, Esclamado was recognized as the only Filipino-American recipient of the congressionally sponsored Ellis Island Medal of Honor award.

On May 9, 1989, President Cory Aquino conferred the Philippine Legion of Honor on Esclamado.

== Later life and death ==
Esclamado returned to the Philippines in August 2011. On November 4, 2012, he died in his home town of Padre Burgos, Southern Leyte, from pneumonia, after a 10-year battle with Parkinson's disease. He was 83. He was survived by his wife, Lourdes, 7 children, 14 grandchildren, and 10 great-grandchildren. On May 13, 2026, Esclamado's wife, Lourdes, passed away at the age of 95.

== Legacy ==
The National Federation of Filipino American Associations (NaFFAA) and GMA Network continue to acknowledge and give tribute to Esclamado's works and contributions to the Filipino-American community by giving the Alex Esclamado Memorial Award for Community Service to deserving Filipino people. The winners for the awards are screened by the Council for Filipino American Organizations of Central Florida, the West Bay Pilipino Multi-Service, Inc., Philippine American Chamber of Commerce of Texas, and the Pilipino American Unity for Progress, Inc.
