= Donald E. Washkewicz =

Donald Washkewicz
- Education: Cleveland State; Case Western Reserve University
- Occupation: Former CEO of Parker Hannifin
- Employer: Parker Hannifin (1972–2016)

Donald E. Washkewicz is the former chief executive officer (CEO) of the Parker Hannifin Corporation located in Cleveland, Ohio. He was CEO from July 2001 to January 2015 and president from February 2000 to January 2015. He retired as chairman of Parker Hannifin in 2016.

== Career ==
Washkewicz joined Parker in 1972 as an engineer at the Hose Products Division, was manager of Research and Development and was named general manager of the Parflex Division in 1982. led two of the company's operating groups, as vice president of the Fluid Connectors Group and, later as president of the Hydraulics Group.

Forbes listed Washkewicz in 2012 as number 91 in a list of America's highest-paid CEOs in recognition of the $16.23 million he was compensated that year.

== Education and affiliations ==
Mr. Washkewicz has a bachelor's degree in mechanical engineering from Cleveland State University and a master's degree in Business Administration from Case Western Reserve University. He received an honorary doctorate degree for engineering from Cleveland State University in May 2004. Washkewicz is a licensed Professional Engineer in the state of Ohio and a member of the National Society of Professional Engineers.

Washkewicz was on the boards of Greater Cleveland Partnership and MAPI. He was on the NFPA (National Fluid Power Association) Education Committee. He was also a member of NAM.

== Honors ==
Washkewicz received the Distinguished Alumnus Award from the Weatherhead School of Management, Case Western Reserve University in 2002, and the 2002 George B. Davis Distinguished Alumnus Award from Cleveland State University and Fenn College of Engineering. He received the Ellis Island Medal of Honor in 2003 and the Sacred Fire of Liberty Award in September 2014.
