= Arthur L. Parker =

American businessman and inventor

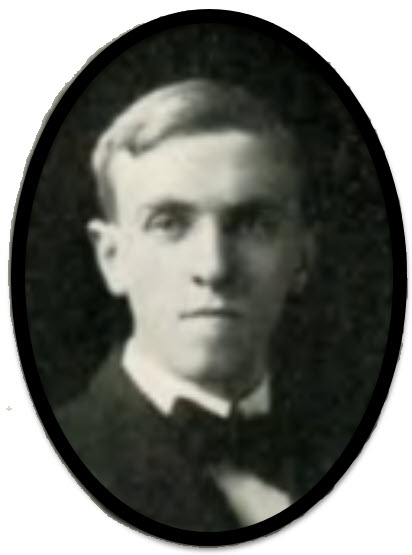
- Art Parker in his 1907 senior photo from Case Western Reserve University
- Born: Arthur LaRue Parker; November 16, 1885; Cleveland, Ohio, U.S.
- Died: January 1, 1945 (aged 59); Cleveland, Ohio, U.S.
- Resting place: Lake View Cemetery, Cleveland, Ohio, U.S. 41.5125°N 81.5868°W
- Education: Case School of Applied Science
- Known for: Founder of Parker Appliance Company (Parker Hannifin Corporation)
- Spouse: Helen Fitzgerald Parker
- Children: 4, including Patrick S. Parker

Arthur LaRue Parker (November 16, 1885 – January 1, 1945) was an American businessman and inventor, known for founding Parker Hannifin Corporation (then known as Parker Appliance Company).

== Early life and education ==
Parker was born and raised in Cleveland, Ohio and graduated from Case School of Applied Science in 1907, present day Case Western Reserve University, with a degree in electrical engineering. As both a student and alumnus, Art strongly supported the Case's athletic programs, being a season ticket holder for both football and baseball and a member of the Case Athletic Association for many years.

== Career ==
In 1908, Parker filed his first patent, a mechanism that regulated the speed of a generator to create a constant output of electricity. Throughout his entire career, he filed 160 additional patents. The primary patent giving Parker his entrepreneurial beginnings was filed in 1914 for his pneumatic braking system.

=== Founding of a company ===
On March 13, 1917, Parker Appliance Company was founded, referencing the office address of 1115 Schofield Bldg of the Schofield Building in Downtown Cleveland. His first production facility was located at 2420 Superior Viaduct in the Ohio City neighborhood of Cleveland.

=== World War I ===
Art served in the United States Army, and arrived on the Western Front in France in July of 1918. During the Meuse–Argonne offensive, Art supported as a Transportation Officer, where his supply truck became a makeshift ambulance helping transport wounded American and French soldiers.

=== Growth of a company ===
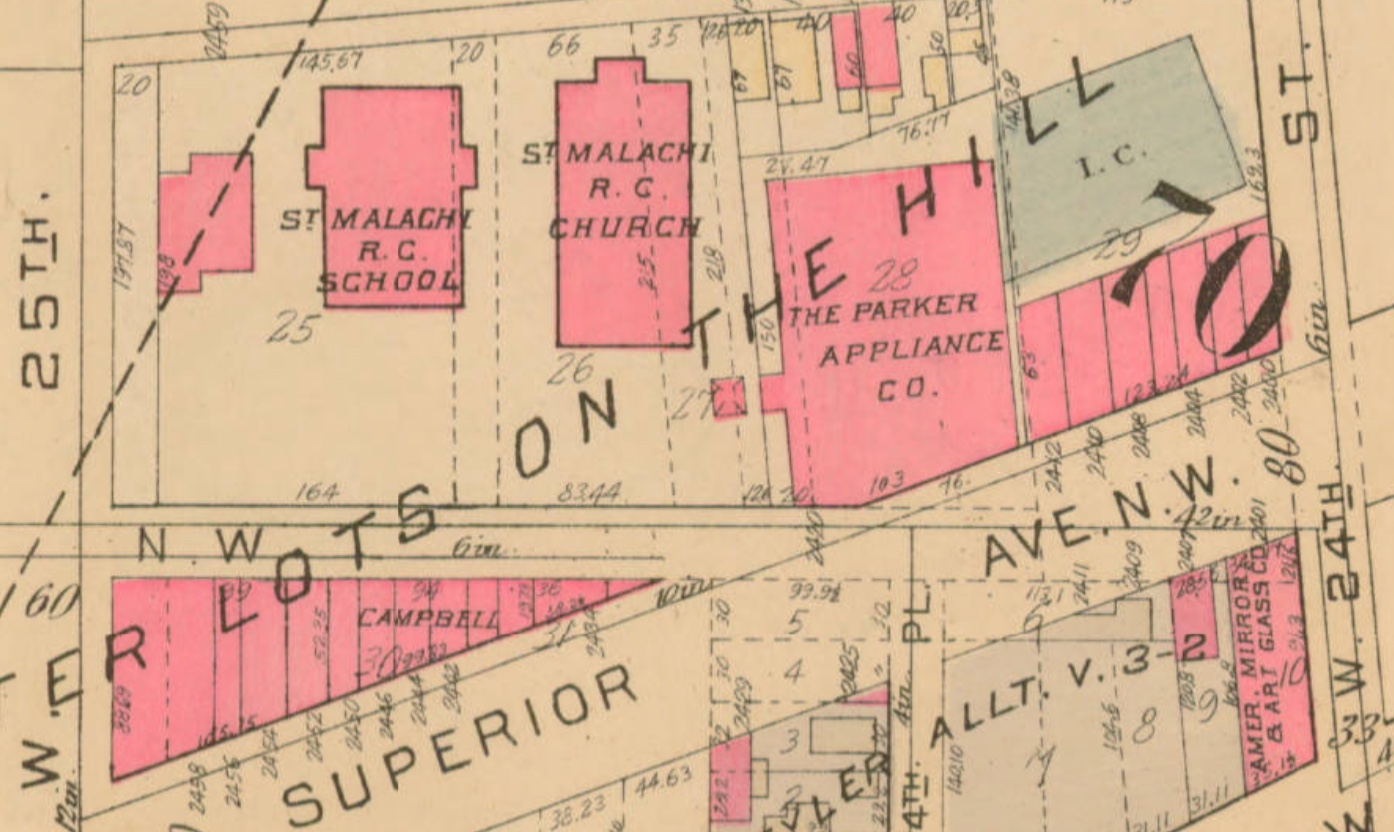
Art Parker's first production facility was located in Cleveland's Ohio City neighborhood along the Superior Viaduct.

Early struggles caused him to have to stop and start the business. In 1924 the business was closed and reopened at the address of 10320 Berea Rd in Cleveland. In 1927, having invented and patented a tubing fitting that would not leak under high pressure, Parker convinced young aviator Charles Lindbergh, who was preparing to attempt a non-stop New York-to-Paris flight, to use Parker products in the fuel system of his plane, the Spirit of St. Louis. Lindbergh's successful flight resulted in a major boost in Parker's business fortunes.

In 1935, Parker relocated the company into the much larger building at 17325 Euclid Ave in Cleveland. By then, Parker's products had gained widespread acceptance in aircraft, marine and industrial applications and the future of his business was assured.

== Death ==
Parker died of a heart attack on January 1, 1945, and was interred at Lake View Cemetery in Cleveland.

== Legacy ==
After Parker's death, his widow, Helen Parker, put all of her $1 million life insurance policy payment back into the company, saving it from insolvency, to continue Art's life work to what would become the Fortune 500 company Parker Hannifin Corporation.
