= George Uribe =

George Uribe (born November 20, 1968) is a veteran television producer and founder and CEO of GuestBooker.com.

Uribe has served as a Booker for Fox News Channel, Producer for MSNBC and Editorial Producer for CNN. He was awarded a certificate of appreciation from the National Academy of Television Arts and Sciences for his coverage of September 11, 2001 while at Fox News Channel. He was awarded the NBC Universal Ovation Award for Breaking News Coverage in June 2004. He has served as a Judge for the New York Emmys and The New York Festivals.

Uribe and Shawn Sachs are co-founders of Newsmakers, a regular social of Journalists, Bookers, Producers and Public Relations Professionals in New York City. Uribe also founded the Music City Media Mixer, a monthly luncheon for publishing and music industry professionals, in Nashville.

Uribe received a B.A. from North Carolina State University in Raleigh, North Carolina and an M.A. from The George Washington University in Washington, DC. He is a graduate of the Non-Commissioned Officers Academy at Fort Jackson, South Carolina. Uribe served as a spokesperson for the United States Army Reserve 77th Regional Readiness Command from 2001-2006.

In 2015, he was named an Ellis Island Medal of Honor winner. Also in 2015, the Tennessee House of Representatives passed HR 119, a resolution to honor and commend George Uribe for his contributions in media and philanthropy.
