= Paramount Global =

American multinational mass media and entertainment conglomerate (2019–2025)

- Corporate logo used from 2022 to 2025 (Note: This logo was also used by Paramount Skydance from 2025 to 2026 with the byline 'A Skydance Corporation'.)

- Paramount's headquarters at One Astor Plaza in Midtown Manhattan, New York City
- Trade name: Paramount
- Formerly: ViacomCBS Inc. (2019–2022)
- Type: Public
- Traded as: Nasdaq: VIACA (Class A; 2019–2022); Nasdaq: VIAC (Class B; 2019–2022); Nasdaq: PARAA (Class A; 2022–2025); Nasdaq: PARA (Class B; 2022–2025); S&P 500 component; Russell 1000 Index component
- ISIN: US92556H2067
- Industry: Media; Entertainment
- Predecessors: CBS Corporation; Viacom
- Founded: December 4, 2019; 6 years ago
- Defunct: August 7, 2025; 15 months ago
- Fate: Merged with Skydance Media to form Paramount Skydance
- Successor: Skydance
- Headquarters: One Astor Plaza, New York City, U.S.
- Area served: Worldwide
- Key people: Shari Redstone (chairwoman); Chris McCarthy (co-CEO); Brian Robbins (co-CEO); George Cheeks (co-CEO)
- Products: Films; music; television programs; web portals
- Services: Licensing; broadcasting; streaming; television
- Revenue: ▼US$29.2 billion (2024)
- Operating income: ▼ −US$5.3 billion (2024)
- Net income: ▼ −US$6.2 billion (2024)
- Total assets: ▼US$46.2 billion (2024)
- Total equity: ▼US$16.8 billion (2024)
- Owner: National Amusements (9.7% equity, 79.9% voting power)
- Number of employees: 18,600 (2024)
- Divisions: Filmed Entertainment; Direct-to-Consumer; TV Media
- Subsidiaries: List of assets owned by Paramount Global
- Website: paramount.com

Paramount Global, traded and commonly known as Paramount, was an American multinational mass media and entertainment conglomerate controlled by National Amusements and headquartered at One Astor Plaza in Times Square, Midtown Manhattan. It was formed on December 4, 2019, as ViacomCBS, through the merger of the second incarnations of Viacom and CBS Corporation, which were split from the original Viacom in 2005. On February 16, 2022, ViacomCBS was renamed to Paramount.

Paramount's main properties included the namesake Paramount Pictures Corporation, the CBS Entertainment Group (consisting of the CBS television network and television stations as well as The CW and other CBS-branded assets), the BET Media Group (which oversees BET and its sister channels), Paramount Media Networks (consisting of locally-based cable television networks including MTV, Nickelodeon, Comedy Central, CMT, Paramount Network and Showtime) and Paramount Streaming (including Paramount+ and Pluto TV). It also had an international division that manages international versions of its cable networks, as well as region-specific assets including Argentina's Telefe, Chile's Chilevisión, the United Kingdom's 5 and Australia's Network 10. From 2011 to 2023, the division also owned a 30% stake in Rainbow S.p.A. of Italy. It also operated over 170 networks and reaches approximately 700 million subscribers in 180 countries.

On July 2, 2024, Skydance Media announced a three-way merger between it, Paramount, and National Amusements, to form Paramount Skydance. On July 24, the Federal Communications Commission approved the merger, which was closed on August 7.

== Background ==
Paramount Pictures, CBS, and Viacom each had a history of being associated with one another through a series of various corporate mergers and splits. Paramount Pictures was founded in 1912 as the Famous Players Film Company. CBS was founded in 1927, which Paramount Pictures held a 49% ownership stake in from 1929 to 1932. In 1952, CBS formed CBS Television Film Sales, a division which handled syndication rights for CBS's library of network-owned television series. This division was renamed CBS Films in 1958, again renamed CBS Enterprises in January 1968, and finally renamed Viacom (an acronym of Video and Audio Communications) in 1970. In 1971, this syndication division was spun off amid new Federal Communications Commission (FCC) rules forbidding television networks from owning syndication companies (these rules were eventually abolished completely in 1993). In 1986, Viacom purchased MTV Networks and Showtime/The Movie Channel Inc. from Warner Communications and American Express. In 1987, Viacom was acquired by theater operator company National Amusements.

=== Paramount Communications (1989–1994) and Viacom Inc. and CBS Corporation (1994–2005) ===
Meanwhile, Paramount Pictures was acquired by Gulf and Western Industries in 1966, which then re-branded itself as Paramount Communications in 1989. Viacom then purchased Paramount Communications in 1994. In 1999, Viacom made its biggest acquisition to date by announcing plans to merge with its former parent CBS Corporation (the renamed Westinghouse Electric Corporation, which had merged with CBS in 1995). The merger was completed in 2000, resulting in CBS reuniting with its former syndication division.

=== Viacom Inc. and CBS Corporation (2005–2019) ===
On December 31, 2005, Viacom was split into two companies: the second incarnation of CBS Corporation, the former's corporate successor, and the second incarnation of Viacom, which was formed as a spin-off.

== History ==
=== Formation ===
On September 29, 2016, National Amusements wrote to its in-control subsidiaries, Viacom and CBS Corporation, encouraging a merger. On December 12, the deal was called off.

On January 12, 2018, CNBC reported that Viacom had re-entered talks to merge back into CBS Corporation, after the merger of AT&T and Time Warner and Disney's then-proposed acquisition of most of 21st Century Fox's assets were announced. Viacom and CBS Corporation also faced heavy competition from companies such as Netflix and Amazon. Shortly afterward, it was reported that the combined company could be a suitor for acquiring the media company Lionsgate (now Starz Entertainment). Viacom and Lionsgate were both interested in acquiring The Weinstein Company (TWC). Following the Weinstein effect, Viacom was listed as one of 22 potential buyers that were interested in acquiring TWC. They lost the bid, and on March 1, 2018, it was announced that Maria Contreras-Sweet would acquire all of TWC's assets for $500 million. Lantern Capital would later acquire the studio.

On March 30, 2018, CBS Corporation made an all-stock offer slightly below Viacom's market value, insisting that its existing leadership, including long-time chairman and CEO Les Moonves, oversee the re-combined company. Viacom rejected the offer as too low, requesting a $2.8 billion increase and that Bob Bakish be maintained as president and COO under Moonves. These conflicts had resulted from Shari Redstone seeking more control over CBS Corporation and its leadership.

Eventually, on May 14, 2018, CBS Corporation sued its and Viacom's parent company National Amusements and accused Redstone of abusing her voting power in the company and forcing a merger that was not supported by it or Viacom. CBS Corporation also accused Redstone of discouraging Verizon Communications from acquiring it, which could have been beneficial to its shareholders.

On May 23, 2018, Les Moonves explained that he considered the Viacom channels to be an "albatross," and while he favored more content for CBS All Access (now Paramount+), he believed that there were better deals for CBS Corporation than the Viacom deal, such as Metro-Goldwyn-Mayer (MGM), Lionsgate, or Sony Pictures. Moonves also considered Bakish a threat because he did not want an ally of Shari Redstone as a board member of the combined company.

On September 9, 2018, Les Moonves exited CBS Corporation following multiple accusations of sexual assault. National Amusements agreed to not propose a CBS Corporation-Viacom merger for at least two years after the date of the settlement.

On May 30, 2019, CNBC reported that CBS Corporation and Viacom would explore merger discussions in mid-June 2019. CBS Corporation's board of directors was revamped with people who were open to merging; the re-merger was made possible with the resignation of Moonves, who had opposed all merger attempts. The talks had started following rumors of CBS Corporation acquiring Starz from Lionsgate. Reports said that CBS Corporation and Viacom reportedly set August 8 as an informal deadline for reaching an agreement to recombine the two media companies. CBS Corporation announced its plans to acquire Viacom as part of the re-merger deal for up to $15.4 billion.

On August 2, 2019, it was reported that CBS Corporation and Viacom agreed to merge back into one entity, with both companies agreeing on the management team for the merger. Bob Bakish would serve as CEO of the combined company with the president and acting CEO of CBS Corporation, Joseph Ianniello, overseeing CBS Corporation-branded assets. On August 7, 2019, CBS and Viacom separately reported their quarterly earnings as the talks about the re-merger continued.

=== Initial operations ===
ViacomCBS' logo used from 2019 to 2022; the logo's colors were initially inverted from 2019 to 2020

On August 13, 2019, CBS and Viacom officially announced their merger; the combined company was to be named ViacomCBS, with Shari Redstone serving as chair. Upon the merger agreement, Viacom and CBS jointly announced that the transaction was expected to close by the end of 2019, pending regulatory and shareholder approvals; the merger was completed on December 4, 2019.

On October 28, 2019, the merger was approved by National Amusements, which then announced the deal would close in early December; the recombined company trades its shares on Nasdaq under the symbols "VIAC" and "VIACA" after CBS Corporation delisted its shares on the New York Stock Exchange (NYSE).

On November 25, 2019, Viacom and CBS announced the merger would close on December 4 and begin trading on NASDAQ on the next day. On December 4, 2019, Bakish confirmed that the ViacomCBS merger had closed.

On December 10, 2019, days after the merger, Bakish announced that ViacomCBS would look to divest Black Rock, the building that held CBS's headquarters since 1964. He stated, "Black Rock is not an asset we need to own and we believe that money would be put to better use elsewhere." On December 20, 2019, ViacomCBS agreed to acquire a 49% minority stake in the film studio Miramax from beIN Media Group for $379 million. As part of the purchase, Paramount Pictures reached a long-term deal for exclusive distribution rights to its library, and first-look agreements to co-develop new film and television projects based on Miramax-owned properties.

On March 2, 2020, executive vice president Dana McClintock announced that he would depart the company after 27 years in CBS Communications. On March 4, the company announced plans to potentially sell its Simon & Schuster publishing unit, with Bakish arguing that it lacked a "significant connection for our broader business".

On June 19, 2020, Jaime Ondarza, formerly the senior vice president of Turner Broadcasting South Europe and Africa, became the new head of ViacomCBS Networks International for France, Spain, Portugal, Italy, the Middle East, Greece, and Turkey. On August 4, 2020, ViacomCBS announced that the company's connected video advertising platform, EyeQ, is set to launch in fall 2020.

On September 14, 2020, ViacomCBS announced an agreement to sell the CBSi-owned CNET Media Group to Red Ventures for $500 million. The deal included the eponymous CNET tech site, as well as ZDNet, GameSpot, the TV Guide digital assets, Metacritic, and Chowhound. The deal closed on October 30, 2020.

On November 17, 2020, various news outlets reported that companies such as Vivendi, Bertelsmann's Penguin Random House and News Corp's HarperCollins had considered acquiring Simon & Schuster for as much as $1.7 billion. ViacomCBS had expected the bids to be placed before November 26. On November 25, 2020, Penguin Random House agreed to purchase Simon & Schuster for $2.175 billion; however, the deal was blocked two years later by U.S. federal judge Florence Y. Pan. On August 16, 2021, ViacomCBS announced that it had agreed to sell the CBS Building to the real estate investment and management firm Harbor Group International for $760 million, leasing the space back under a short-term lease. On September 28, 2021, ViacomCBS announced that it had agreed to partner with software and data firm VideoAmp. On October 28, 2021, ViacomCBS announced that it had agreed to acquire a majority stake in the Spanish-language content producer TeleColombia & Estudios TeleMexico. On November 30, 2021, ViacomCBS announced that it had agreed to sell the CBS Studio Center to Hackman Capital Partners and Square Mile Capital Management for $1.85 billion.

On January 5, 2022, The Wall Street Journal reported that ViacomCBS and WarnerMedia (whose then-owner AT&T was selling it to Discovery to form Warner Bros. Discovery) were exploring a possible sale of either a majority stake or all of The CW, and that Nexstar Media Group was considered a leading bidder. Reports indicated that ViacomCBS and WarnerMedia could include a contractual commitment that would require any new owner to buy new programming from those companies, allowing them to reap some continual revenue through the network. Then-network president/CEO Mark Pedowitz confirmed talks of a potential sale in a memo to CW staffers, but added that "It's too early to speculate what might happen."

=== Rebranding to Paramount ===
On February 15, 2022, during a presentation to investors, ViacomCBS announced that it would change its name to Paramount Global beginning the following day; in a memo to staff announcing the change, it was stated that the rebranding was intended to leverage the "iconic global name", and would "reflect who we are, what we aspire to be, and all that we stand for". The company primarily does business as simply "Paramount". Following the rename, Paramount Pictures' website URL changed from paramount.com to paramountpictures.com, while Paramount took the paramount.com URL.

Nexstar announced on August 15 that it would acquire a 75% majority share in The CW; the remaining 25% would be shared equally by Paramount and Warner Bros. Discovery. As the deal did not require any regulatory approvals (unlike the "Big Four" networks, which includes CBS, The CW had previously never owned or controlled its own stations outside of its network service for smaller markets), Nexstar immediately took operational control of the network on the same day. The deal was closed on October 3, with CEO Mark Pedowitz stepping down and Dennis Miller taking Pedowitz's role as president of The CW. Paramount's CBS News and Stations unit announced on May 5, 2023, that its eight CW stations would become independent on September 1, per the Nexstar buyout deal. On August 7, Paramount announced that it had agreed to sell Simon & Schuster to private equity firm KKR for $1.6 billion in cash. The sale was completed on October 30.

=== Merger with Skydance Media ===
On December 20, 2023, it was reported by Axios and The New York Times that David Zaslav, CEO of Warner Bros. Discovery, had met with Bob Bakish and had discussed a possible merger. Spokespeople for the two companies stated that the talks were preliminary and may not result in a deal, while Fox Business reported via internal sources that Zaslav was "not in deal mode".

On January 10, 2024, National Amusements was reported to be considering a deal or merger regarding Paramount Global, with Skydance Media considering an all-cash bid of $2.5 billion for the earlier company. During this time, Paramount announced it would be laying off 800 employees. On February 27, 2024, CNBC reported that Warner Bros. Discovery halted the merger talks with Paramount.

On April 2, 2024, Paramount and National Amusements approached Skydance for an exclusive acquisition window agreement. Shari Redstone and David Ellison sought a three-way transaction between the companies. On April 18, it was reported that Sony Pictures was interested in acquiring Paramount Global through a joint buyout with Apollo.

On April 29, 2024, Bob Bakish stepped down from his role as president and CEO. He was replaced by an office of the CEO, led by Brian Robbins, George Cheeks and Chris McCarthy. The Los Angeles Times characterized this as an ouster by Redstone due to Bakish's reported opposition of the Skydance deal. McCarthy was legally designated the company's "interim principal executive officer" in order to comply with SEC regulations stipulating that one person must conduct "the normal course of business".

On May 2, Sony and Apollo submitted a non-binding offer to Paramount for a $26 billion all-cash offer, with terms unclear at that point. Skydance's exclusive negotiation window ended on May 3, 2024 and was not renewed, although the company was still interested in buying Paramount. The following day, Paramount's board members met, considering a "go-shop" approach for other such offers; it was ultimately decided that they would begin negotiations regarding Sony and Apollo's offer while still holding non-exclusive talks with Skydance. That same day, Berkshire Hathaway's Warren Buffett stated in an annual meeting that he had sold all of his shares in Paramount at a substantial loss. By May 17, Sony and Apollo signed non-disclosure agreements allowing them to investigate Paramount's private financial information, further progressing their bid. However, at that time, the companies were reportedly backing away from their all-cash offer and were re-thinking their approach to a deal for the company's assets.

In late May, Skydance would revise its offer to acquire National Amusements, paying $2.25 billion and stipulating that Paramount's shareholders would receive $4.5 billion in cash, with the company taking $1.5 billion in debt reduction funds, which The Wall Street Journal reported an independent committee representing Paramount had ultimately recommended. By June 3, Paramount and Skydance had agreed to terms of a merger. A final deal was expected to be announced in the coming days. However, at that point, Redstone's National Amusements had not formally approved the deal. Redstone was reportedly displeased with the revised terms, as she would now received less money for her shares and Skydance wanted Redstone to assume legal liabilities in the case of shareholders lawsuits unhappy with the deal. She considered a sale of her company to another bidder, with such names as writer and producer Steven Paul, businessman Edgar Bronfman Jr., Bain Capital, Patrón Tequila founder John Paul DeJoria and businessman Barry Diller in the running. On June 11, National Amusements announced it had failed to reach an agreement with Skydance to acquire Paramount.

By July 2, 2024, Skydance renegotiated the deal and reached a preliminary agreement to acquire National Amusements and merge with Paramount. The deal was referred by National Amusements to Paramount's special committee. Also, Paramount reportedly entered talks for a sale of the BET Media Group to buyers led by BET CEO Scott Mills for $1.6–$1.7 billion.

On July 7, 2024, Paramount's board approved the deal to merge with Skydance. Under the final deal, which has an enterprise value of $28 billion, Ellison would be appointed as chairman and CEO of what is currently being called "New Paramount" and former NBCUniversal CEO Jeff Shell would become company president. Before finalization, Paramount Global would retain a 45-day window to shop for matching or superior offers from other bidders. Redstone will receive $2.4 billion for her share in National Amusements. If Paramount were to find a better offer, Skydance would be entitled to a $400 million breakup fee payout from the company. Skydance's executive team supported the potential sale of several Paramount assets which were deemed "not strategic" to its plans, including BET and others.

In August 2024, Paramount announced it would lay off 15% of its U.S. workforce, amounting to about 2,000 employees. The cuts came as a result of a $6 billion write-down on its cable television networks. This included the shutdown of Paramount Television Studios. The following month, Paramount sold Vidcon to UK firm Informa.

In November 2024, it was reported that Shari Redstone would leave Paramount Global after the company completed its planned merger with Skydance Media. As previously announced, the merged entity will see David Ellison, founder of Skydance Media, assume the roles of chairman and CEO, while Jeff Shell, former CEO of NBCUniversal, will become president. In December 2024, before merger, Paramount consolidated its television and streaming units into one.

In July 2025, the company agreed to pay a $16 million payment to settle a lawsuit filed by President Donald Trump alleging deceptive editing of its October 2024 60 Minutes interview with his Democratic rival, Kamala Harris.

A few weeks later, on July 15, the Late Show host, Stephen Colbert, called the $16 million payment "a big fat bribe" to Trump. Three days later, Paramount announced the cancellation of The Late Show with Stephen Colbert, although later reporting indicated that Colbert's talent manager had been informed of the cancellation on June 27. The Writers Guild of America East and West has called for NY attorney general Letitia James to look into wrongdoing at Paramount as a result, specifically investigating whether "The Late Show’s cancelation is a bribe, sacrificing free speech to curry favor with the Trump Administration as the company looks for merger approval".

On July 24, the FCC approved the merger. The deal was officially closed on August 7.

== Company units ==
Paramount Global comprised seven major units split into three business segments:

- Filmed Entertainment consisted of the company's film studios as well as the Nickelodeon-branded television and film studios.
  - Paramount Motion Picture Group consists of Paramount Pictures Corporation, the company's namesake division which focuses on theatrical film production and distribution, including film releases under the Paramount Animation and Paramount Players labels in addition to the flagship Paramount Pictures label. Other assets owned by Paramount include Republic Pictures and a 49% stake in Miramax. The company also consists of Paramount Studio Group (physical studio and post-production), production facilities and lot, and archives for restoration/preservation for Paramount Home Entertainment and Music.
  - Nickelodeon Studios consisted of Nickelodeon's live-action television content production unit as well as Nickelodeon Movies. The unit is also responsible for Nickelodeon Animation Studio (including Avatar Studios) and AwesomenessTV.
- Direct-to-Consumer focuses on the global over-the-top streaming services that encompasses Paramount+, Pluto TV, SkyShowtime (50% with Comcast through Sky Group), CBS News 24/7, CBS Sports HQ and BET+.
- TV Media consisted of the company's linear television networks as well as television content production, outside of Nickelodeon.
  - CBS Entertainment Group consists of CBS-branded assets including the CBS television network, CBS News and Stations, CBS Sports, CBS Studios, CBS Media Ventures and Big Ticket Television. It also has a 12.5% ownership stake in The CW Television Network. In addition, the group consists of the BET Media Group, which contains BET, BET Her and other BET-branded cable television channels.
  - Paramount Global Content Distribution encompasses as the global international distribution arm that handles global distribution and licensing of productions produced by Paramount's television production companies for international networks and streaming services worldwide.
  - Paramount Media Networks encompasses the pay television channels owned by Paramount in the United States such as MTV, Nickelodeon (including Nick Jr.), Paramount+ with Showtime, Comedy Central, TV Land, Paramount Network, Logo, CMT, Pop TV, Smithsonian Channel, The Movie Channel, Flix and VH1, as well as controlling its production facilities for the aforementioned channels, including Nickelodeon Animation Studio and Showtime/MTV Entertainment Studios.
  - Paramount International Networks encompasses international versions of its television channels split into three regional hubs: United Kingdom and Australia, Europe, Middle East, Africa and Asia (EMEAA), and the Americas, as well as region-specific networks (such as 5 (formerly Channel 5) in the United Kingdom, Network 10 in Australia, Telefe in Argentina and Chilevisión in Chile. The division owned a 30% stake in the Rainbow S.p.A. studio in Italy from 2011 to 2023 and 50% of Viacom18 from 2007 to 2024. It also co-owns all CBS-branded channels across Europe with AMC Networks International.
  - Paramount Digital Studios consists of digital online and video internet properties.
- Paramount Experiences focuses on the retailing and licensing of merchandising for Paramount-owned brands. It consists of Paramount Consumer Products and also consists some theme parks.

== Leadership ==
Board of Directors

- Shari Redstone (Non-Executive Chair)
- Mary M. Boies
- Barbara M. Byrne
- Linda M. Griego
- Hon. Roanne Sragow Licht
- Charles E. Ryan
- Susan Schuman

Executives

Office of the CEO

- George Cheeks, President and CEO, CBS and Chief Content Officer, News and Sports, Paramount+
- Chris McCarthy, President and CEO, Showtime/MTV Entertainment Studios and Paramount Media Networks
- Brian Robbins, President and CEO, Paramount Pictures and Nickelodeon; and Chief Content Officer, Movies & Kids & Family, Paramount+
