= Thomas E. Dooley =

American executive

Thomas E. Dooley was the interim president and CEO of Viacom from August until November 15, 2016. He was named COO in May 2010. He had previously held the position of senior executive vice president, chief financial officer and chief administrative officer.

Dooley received a Bachelor of Science degree from St. John's University in New York City in 1978 and a Master of Business Administration from the New York University Stern School of Business in 1984.

Dooley joined Viacom Inc., a predecessor of the current Viacom, in 1980. He held various divisional and corporate positions, including senior vice president, corporate development; president, interactive television; and vice president, finance, and treasurer, as well as deputy chairman. He was also a member of Viacom's executive committee, holding the title of executive vice president, finance, corporate development and communications. He also served as a member of the former Viacom Inc. board from 1996 to 2000.

As a condition of the $36 billion sale of CBS to Viacom in 1999, CBS chairman Mel Karmazin forced Dooley out, insisting that both Dooley and Viacom deputy chairman Philippe Dauman leave the company. Dooley was paid $29 million to buy out his contract and received a $5 million transaction bonus.

Dooley was co-chairman and chief executive officer of DND Capital Partners, a private equity firm specializing in media and telecommunications investments, from May 2000 until September 2006. He returned to Viacom in 2006, serving on Viacom's board of directors at the start of that year.

His responsibilities as include management of all of Viacom's financial functions, including mergers and acquisitions and investor relations. He also supervises the company's corporate operations, including legal, corporate communications, human resources, real estate and information technology.

He is a trustee of the North Shore-LIJ Health System.
