= Podcast Movement =

Annual conference

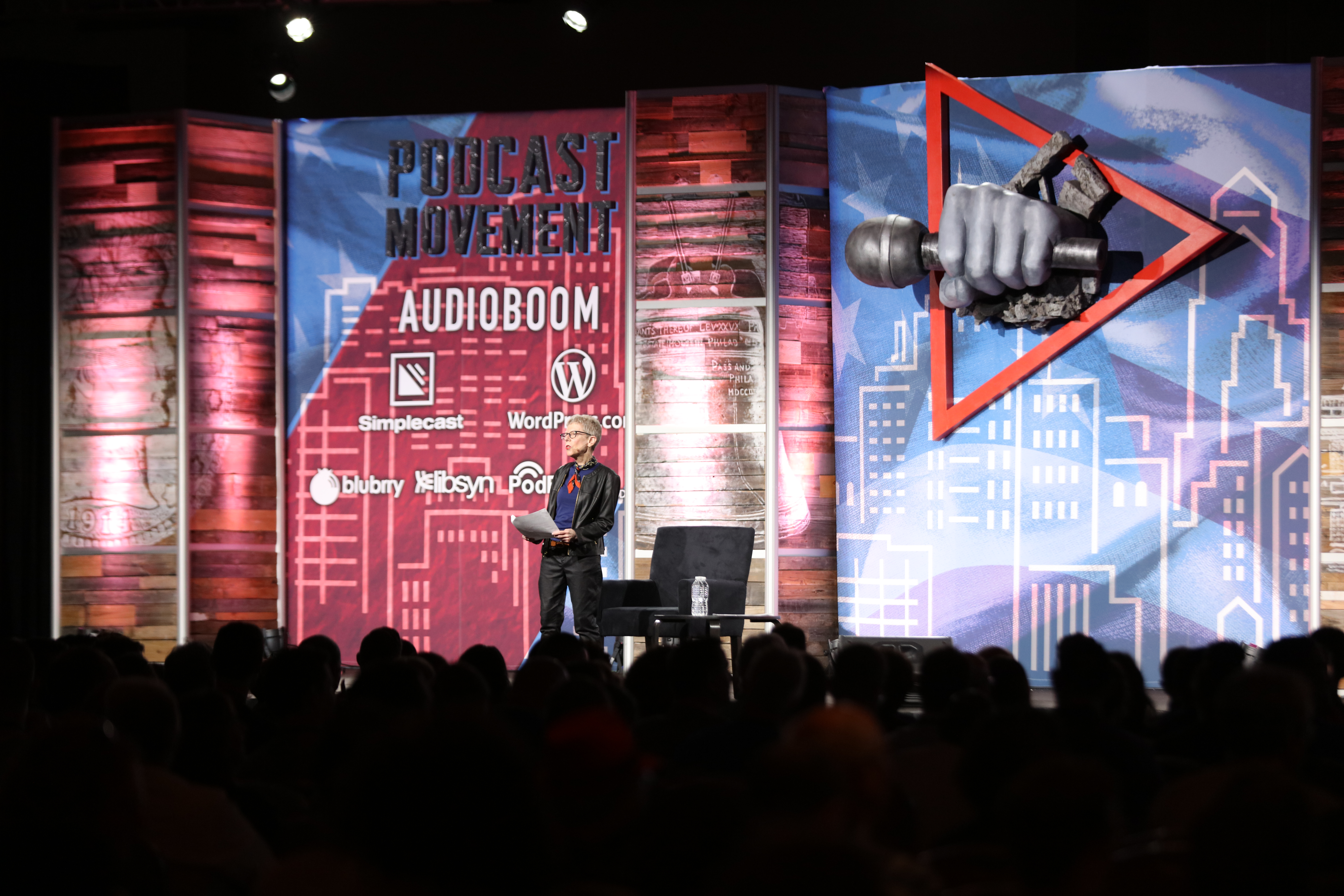
- Status: Active
- Country: United States
- Years active: 2014 – present
- Founders: Dan Franks, Jared Easley, Gary Leland and Mitch Todd
- Website: podcastmovement.com

Podcast Movement (PM) is an annual conference for the podcast industry. It is one of the largest gatherings of participants in podcasting, with over 3,000 attendees in 2019. Described as "for podcasters, by podcasters", it focuses on collaboration and networking among attendees, in addition to education and encouragement.

The 2017 conference was split into different tracks covering different aspects of podcasting such as Creation, Technical, Industry, Monetization, Marketing, Society, Culture & Advocacy, Audio Drama, and Broadcasters Meets Podcasters. Featured speakers have included Sarah Koenig, Aisha Tyler, Kevin Smith, Pat Flynn, Guy Raz, Dan Carlin, Terry Gross, Alex Blumberg, Roman Mars, Marc Maron, Glynn Washington, Mark Cuban and Aaron Mahnke. Exhibitors include software & service providers, gear and equipment manufacturers. Attendees are made up of amateur and professional podcasters, as well as media professionals working for radio broadcasters, podcast networks, technology companies and advertisers.

== History ==
The first conference in 2014 was funded via a Kickstarter campaign. In 2019, the organizers announced an additional annual event called 'Podcast Movement Evolutions,' the first of which took place in Los Angeles in February 2020.

Year	Location
2014	Dallas, Texas
2015	Omni Downtown in Fort Worth, Texas
2016	Chicago, Illinois
2017	Anaheim, California
2018	Philadelphia, Pennsylvania
2019	Orlando, Florida
2020	Los Angeles, California (Evolutions)
2020	PM Virtual (No in-person event because of Covid)
2021	Nashville, Tennessee (Podcast Movement 2021)
2022 (March)	Los Angeles, California (Evolutions)
2022 (August)	Dallas, Texas (Podcast Movement 2022)
2023 (March)	Las Vegas, Nevada (Evolutions)
2023 (August)	Denver, Colorado (Podcast Movement 2023)
2024 (March)	Los Angeles, California (Evolutions)
2024 (August)	Washington, D.C. (Podcast Movement 2024)

== Controversy ==
On August 25, 2022, the official Twitter account of Podcast Movement apologized for hosting the Daily Wire, a conservative podcasting website co-owned by Ben Shapiro. The organization alleged at least one attendee "felt pain" by Shapiro's presence. On September 8 of the same year, they apologized to Mr. Shapiro via Twitter for their previous reaction toward him and his company.
