= Viacom (2005–2019) =

American mass media company

Viacom Inc.

- Headquarters at One Astor Plaza in New York City
- Type: Public
- Traded as: NYSE: VIA (2005–2011); NYSE: VIA.B (2005–2011); Nasdaq: VIA (Class A) (2011–2019); Nasdaq: VIAB (Class B) (2011–2019); S&P 100 component (until 2019); S&P 500 component (until 2019); Nasdaq-100 component (2011–2019)
- Industry: Mass media Entertainment
- Predecessor: Viacom (original incarnation)
- Founded: December 31, 2005; 20 years ago
- Founder: Sumner Redstone
- Defunct: December 4, 2019; 6 years ago
- Fate: Merged with the second incarnation of CBS Corporation to form ViacomCBS
- Successor: Paramount Global
- Headquarters: One Astor Plaza, New York City, U.S.
- Area served: Worldwide
- Key people: Sumner Redstone; (chairman emeritus); Thomas J. May; (chairman); Bob Bakish; (president and CEO)
- Products: Cable television; publishing; motion pictures; games; podcasts; web portals
- Revenue: ▼US$12.838 billion (2019)
- Operating income: ▼US$2.462 billion (2019)
- Net income: ▼US$1.522 billion (2019)
- Total assets: ▼US$23.671 billion (2019)
- Total equity: ▲US$8.520 billion (2019)
- Owner: National Amusements (80% voting power)
- Number of employees: 11,200 (2017)
- Divisions: Filmed Entertainment; Cable Networks
- Subsidiaries: Viacom Media Networks; Viacom International Media Networks; Viacom18 (49%); Rainbow S.p.A. (30%); Bellator MMA; WhoSay; VidCon; AwesomenessTV; Paramount Pictures; Pluto TV; Paws, Inc.
- Website: www.viacom.com (archived on December 3, 2019)

The second incarnation of Viacom Inc. (/ˈvaɪəkɒm/ VY-ə-kom or /ˈviːəkɒm/ Vie-ah-kom; a portmanteau of Video & Audio Communications) was an American multinational mass media and entertainment conglomerate with interests primarily in film and television. It was split from the original Viacom on December 31, 2005, alongside the second incarnation of CBS Corporation. The controlling shareholder of both companies was National Amusements, a theater company headed by businessman Sumner Redstone. The split was structured so that the original Viacom changed its name to CBS Corporation and spun out its cable and film interests as a new Viacom.

The second Viacom operated Viacom Media Networks, through which it controlled approximately 170 networks and reached approximately 700 million subscribers in approximately 160 countries. Viacom's studio assets included Paramount Pictures, MTV Films, and Nickelodeon Animation Studio, as well as a 30% ownership stake in the Rainbow S.p.A. animation studio. CBS Corporation retained the over-the-air broadcasting, television production, pay television subscription service, and publishing assets, which were previously owned by the first Viacom. The second Viacom was the world's ninth-largest media company in terms of revenue and headquartered at One Astor Plaza in Midtown Manhattan, New York City.

Viacom announced its second merger with CBS Corporation on August 13, 2019. The merger was completed on December 4, resulting in the creation of ViacomCBS (later Paramount Global which would later merge with National Amusements and Skydance Media to form Paramount Skydance Corporation).

== History ==
=== Early years ===
Final old separate Viacom logo, used from 1990 to 2005

In March 2005, the first Viacom announced plans of exploring the option of splitting the company into two publicly traded companies because of a stagnating stock price and the rivalry between Les Moonves and Tom Freston, longtime heads of CBS and MTV Networks, respectively. Also, the company was facing issues after MTV was banned from producing any more Super Bowl halftime shows after the Super Bowl Halftime Show controversy in 2004.

After the departure of Mel Karmazin in 2004, Sumner Redstone, who was chairman and chief executive officer, decided to split the offices of president and chief operating officer between Moonves and Freston. Redstone was set to retire in the near future, and a split was seen as a creative solution to the matter of replacing him. It was also intended to provide alternative investments that would be more appealing to investors: one a high cash flow, lower growth company that could afford to pay a substantial dividend and the other a growing company that would have greater investment opportunities and therefore would not be expected to pay a dividend.

The second Viacom was created by Redstone and headed by Freston. It consisted of BET Networks, MTV Networks, and Paramount Pictures. It started trading on January 3, 2006.

=== 2000s ===
In June 2005, Viacom announced its purchase of Neopets, a virtual pet website, along with GameTrailers, GoCityKids, and iFilm. That December, Viacom announced it would acquire DreamWorks Pictures. All indications were that the whole of DreamWorks—both live-comedy film and television studios, albeit not the DreamWorks archive (which was sold to a group led by George Soros in March 2006) nor the animated unit (which was not part of the deal, which would later go on be acquired by Comcast subsidiary NBCUniversal in 2016)—would remain owned by Viacom, even though CBS Corporation acquired Paramount's television studio.

On February 1, 2006, Viacom completed the acquisition of DreamWorks. On April 24, Viacom obtained Xfire. In August, Viacom announced that it had acquired Atom Entertainment for $200 million. In September, Viacom acquired game developer Harmonix for $175 million.

In February 2007, Viacom ordered leaked copyrighted video clips be taken off the video-sharing service YouTube for copyright reasons. On February 21, Viacom publicly announced they would be offering free online access to their material through Silicon Valley's distributor Joost.

On May 21, 2007, Viacom entered into a 50–50 joint venture with Indian media company Network 18 to form Viacom 18 which would house Viacom's existing channels in India: MTV, VH1 and Nickelodeon as well as Network 18's Bollywood movie business. All future Viacom content for India and new ventures such as a Hindi entertainment channel and a Hindi movie channel would be housed in this joint venture.

On December 19, 2007, Viacom signed a five-year, $500 million contract with Microsoft that included content sharing and advertisement. The deal allowed Microsoft to license many shows from Viacom owned cable television and film studios for use on Xbox Live and MSN. The deal also made Viacom a preferred publisher partner for casual game development and distribution through MSN and Windows. On the advertisement side of the deal, Microsoft's Atlas ad-serving division became the exclusive provider of previously unsold advertising inventory on Viacom owned websites. Also, Microsoft purchased a large amount of advertising on Viacom owned broadcasts and online networks. Finally, Microsoft would also collaborate on promotions and sponsorships for MTV and BET award shows, two Viacom-owned cable networks.

On December 4, 2008, Viacom announced layoffs of 850 personnel, or 7% of their workforce. At the end of the year, Time Warner Cable (along with partner Bright House Networks) and Viacom's MTV Networks could not come to terms for the renewal of any Viacom channel beyond the end of year. Time Warner Cable's operations include New York City and Los Angeles, with Bright House including the Tampa Bay and Orlando markets, both top-20 markets. This blackout was narrowly avoided when a zero-hour deal was reached shortly after midnight on January 1, 2009.

On December 7, 2009, Viacom sold its stake in MTV Brasil to Grupo Abril along with rights to the brand. Details on the deal were not disclosed.

=== 2010s ===
In February 2011, Hulu and Viacom announced the return of The Daily Show with Jon Stewart and The Colbert Report to Hulu, along with shows from the Viacom library. Nickelodeon's shows are not part of this deal. Also that month, Viacom became a co-owner of Rainbow S.p.A., an Italian television studio best known for the Winx Club franchise. Since the purchase, Viacom's Nickelodeon networks have broadcast Rainbow's shows worldwide. Nickelodeon's American studios have also collaborated with Rainbow on multiple productions, including Winx Club and Club 57.

Later, in October 2011, Viacom purchased a majority stake in Bellator Fighting Championships. Spike started to air Bellator in 2013, after the rights to the Ultimate Fighting Championship (UFC) library ended in 2012.

On December 1, 2011, the company stopped trading on the New York Stock Exchange (NYSE) and began listing its securities on Nasdaq instead. The stock ticker symbols are the same as that used while the company was on the NYSE.

On July 10, 2012, during contract negotiations over raising carrier rates the U.S. satellite television provider, DirecTV's executives approached Viacom with a new proposal and a request to continue broadcasting 17 of Viacom's television networks (including Nickelodeon, MTV, Logo, and Comedy Central) during talks, but received no response and thus Viacom ceased transmission to DirecTV's 20 million subscribers. On July 11, in a counter response to DirecTV advising its subscribers to view original programming from the affected networks online, Viacom scaled back access to recent episodes of Viacom-owned program content available to the websites of its networks. Viacom described this as a "temporary slimdown" until a new carriage deal with DirecTV was reached. Viacom and DirecTV reached an agreement on July 20 to return the interrupted programming. In 2012 CEO Phillip Dauman began to report Viacom's intentions to bundle past programming and make it available on-demand via services like Hulu.

On January 22, 2014, Viacom established a marketing division, Viacom Velocity.

On April 1, 2014, Cable One removed 15 channels owned by Viacom (MTV, VH1, Nickelodeon, and TV Land) off after the two companies failed to reach an agreement. Channels were replaced with other networks, including BBC America, Sprout, Sundance TV, IFC, Investigation Discovery, TV One, CMP/TV, National Geographic Channel, and TheBlaze. The change has been deemed permanent.

On May 1, 2014, Viacom announced it had agreed to take over the British broadcaster Channel 5 from Northern & Shell, the media group owned by the British newspaper publisher Richard Desmond. Viacom becomes the first American media company to take over a British broadcaster with a public service remit. The purchase of Channel 5 closed on September 10, 2014.

On October 1, 2014, Suddenlink Communications, removed channels owned by Viacom off after the two companies failed to reach an agreement. Channels were replaced with other networks including Sprout, FXX, Pivot, Uplifting Entertainment, Investigation Discovery, Oprah Winfrey Network, Women's Entertainment, and TheBlaze.

On August 20, 2016, a settlement between Sumner and Shari Redstone and Philippe Dauman was reached that would have him resign as chief executive officer and be replaced with Thomas E. Dooley as interim CEO. Dauman would continue as chairman until September 13. On May 25, 2017, Viacom channels returned to Suddenlink after nearly 3 years of absence.

In November 2016, Viacom bought Argentine television network Telefe. In December 2016, the Viacom board appointed Bob Bakish as acting CEO. His appointment as president and CEO was made permanent on December 12, 2016. In February 2017, Bakish launched a strategic plan to prioritize Paramount Pictures, BET, Comedy Central, Nickelodeon, Nick Jr. and MTV as Viacom's six "flagship" brands, with Spike being relaunched as Paramount Network in support of this goal. Bakish stated that brands such as CMT, Logo, TV Land, and VH1 would "remain important parts of our network portfolio", and noted that Viacom did not plan to close its smaller channels since they were "very inexpensive" to run.

In November 2017, Viacom announced the opening of a new digital content division named Viacom Digital Studios. The company has hired former AwesomenessTV chief business officer Kelly Day to lead the studio. Day began her duties on November 20. In February 2018, Viacom announced their plans to acquire the internet video conference VidCon in an effort to reach out to youth audiences (in a similar way to Viacom's Nickelodeon and MTV channels).

In the same month, Viacom announced that they would launch an official Viacom streaming service in fall 2018, in another effort by Bakish to revitalize the company. This streaming service would support ads (similar to Hulu) and was expected to include television series from Viacom Media Networks that have not been available on other services, such as Hulu or Amazon Prime Video. Bakish stated that the streaming service would be a "complement" to OTT MVPDs, rather than a replacement.

In April 2018, Viacom hosted its first presentation at the annual Digital Content NewFronts, where they announced new original content for sites such as Facebook, Twitter, and Snapchat. They also announced the expansion of VidCon to London in 2019 at the same conference.

On July 25, 2018, Viacom announced that it was in talks to acquire AwesomenessTV for a fraction of the company's $650 million valuation in 2016. Two days later on July 27, Viacom officially acquired the company for $25 million. Jordan Levin left his position as CEO of AwesomenessTV following the acquisition. In January 2019, Viacom acquired the free ad–supported streaming television (FAST) service Pluto TV for $340 million.

==== Re-merger deal with CBS ====
On September 29, 2016, National Amusements sent a letter to Viacom and CBS Corporation, encouraging the two companies to merge back into one company. On December 12, the deal was called off.

On January 12, 2018, CNBC reported that Viacom had re-entered talks to merge back into CBS Corporation after the AT&T-Time Warner merger was planned, as well as Disney's proposed acquisition of most 21st Century Fox assets and heavy competition from companies such as Netflix and Amazon. Shortly afterward, it was reported that the combined company could be a suitor for acquiring the film studio Lionsgate. Viacom and Lionsgate were both interested in acquiring The Weinstein Company (TWC) in the wake of sexual abuse allegations against Harvey Weinstein. Viacom was listed as one of 22 potential buyers that were interested in acquiring TWC. They lost the bid, and on March 1, 2018, it was announced that Maria Contreras-Sweet would acquire all of TWC's assets for $500 million.

On March 30, 2018, CBS made an all-stock offer slightly below Viacom's market value and insisted that its existing leadership, including long-time chairman and CEO Les Moonves, oversee the re-combined company. Viacom rejected the offer as being too low, requesting an increase of $2.8 billion, and requesting that Bob Bakish be maintained as president and COO under Moonves. It was reported that these conflicts had resulted from Shari Redstone seeking more control over CBS and its leadership.

Eventually, on May 14, 2018, CBS Corporation sued Viacom's parent company National Amusements and accused Redstone of abusing her voting power in the company and forcing a merger that was not supported by CBS or Viacom. CBS also accused Redstone of discouraging Verizon Communications from acquiring it, which could have been beneficial to its shareholders.

On May 23, 2018, Les Moonves explained that he considered the Viacom channels to be an "albatross," and while he favored more content for CBS All Access (now Paramount+), he believed that there were better deals for CBS than the Viacom deal, such as Metro-Goldwyn-Mayer (MGM), Lionsgate or Sony Pictures. Moonves also considered Bakish a threat because he did not want an ally of Redstone as a board member of the combined company.

On September 9, 2018, Moonves left CBS after being accused by twelve women of sexual assault. National Amusements agreed to not propose a CBS-Viacom merger for at least two years after the date of the settlement.

On May 30, 2019, CNBC reported that CBS and Viacom would explore merger discussions in mid-June 2019. CBS's board of directors was revamped with people who were open to a merger. The re-merger was made possible with the resignation of Moonves (who opposed all attempts for a Viacom merger). The talks had started following rumors of CBS acquiring Starz from Lionsgate. Reports say that CBS and Viacom reportedly set August 8 as an informal deadline for reaching an agreement to recombine the two media companies. CBS announced to acquire Viacom as part of the re-merger deal for up to $15.4 billion.

On August 2, 2019, it was reported that CBS and Viacom agreed to merge back into one entity. Both companies came to an agreement on the management team for its merger with Bakish as CEO of the combined company and president and acting CEO of CBS, as Joseph Ianniello oversees the CBS-branded assets. However, on August 7, 2019, both CBS and Viacom delayed their merger announcement as the two companies reported the quarterly earnings, though the talks about the re-merger continued.

On August 13, 2019, CBS and Viacom officially announced their merger; CBS would purchase Viacom and change its name to ViacomCBS (later renamed Paramount Global before merging with Skydance Media and National Amusements to form Paramount Skydance Corporation) Bakish would become president and CEO of ViacomCBS with Ianniello as chairman and CEO of CBS, where he would oversee the CBS-branded assets. Shari Redstone would also be chairwoman of the new company. On October 29, 2019, National Amusements approved the re-merger deal and expected to close the deal in early December with the recombined company trading its shares on Nasdaq under the symbols "VIAC" and "VIACA". On December 4, the deal was completed.

== Copyright complaints against YouTube ==
In February 2007, Viacom sent upwards of 100,000 Digital Millennium Copyright Act takedown notices to the video-sharing site YouTube. Of the 100,000 notices, approximately 60–70 non-infringing videos were removed under the auspices of copyright infringement.

On March 13, 2007, Viacom filed a US$1 billion legal claim (Viacom International Inc. v. YouTube, Inc.) against Google and YouTube alleging massive copyright infringement, alleging that users frequently uploaded copyrighted material to YouTube—enough to cause a hit in revenue for Viacom and a gain in advertisement revenue for YouTube. The complaint contended that almost 160,000 unauthorized clips of Viacom's programming were made available on YouTube and that these clips had collectively been viewed more than 1.5 billion times.

In July 2008, the case generated controversy when District Judge Louis Stanton ruled that YouTube was required to hand over data detailing the viewing habits of every user who had ever watched videos on the site. Judge Stanton rejected Viacom's request for YouTube to hand over the source code of its search engine system, saying that the code was a trade secret. Google and Viacom later agreed to allow Google to anonymize all the data before handing it over to Viacom.

On June 23, 2010, Judge Stanton ruled in Google's favor in a motion for summary judgment, holding that Google was protected by provisions of the Digital Millennium Copyright Act, notwithstanding evidence of intentional copyright infringement. Viacom announced its intention to appeal the ruling.

On April 5, 2012, the ruling was overturned by the United States Court of Appeals for the Second Circuit. Writing for a two-judge panel (because Judge Roger Miner had died while the trial was pending) of the Second Circuit, Judge José A. Cabranes concluded that "a reasonable jury could find that YouTube had actual knowledge or awareness of specific infringing activity on its website". Eric Goldman, a professor at the Santa Clara University School of Law, expressed concern that the ruling would negatively affect startups, by making them "more hair-trigger on taking down news or content, for fear that failure to do so will be held against them by content providers".

On April 18, 2013, Judge Stanton issued another order granting summary judgment in favor of YouTube. An appeal was begun, but the week before the parties were to appear in the 2nd U.S. Circuit Court of Appeals, a settlement was announced, and it was reported that no money changed hands. Viacom and its alternative name B_Viacom have since taken to removing videos or blocked countries themselves.

== Corporate governance ==
The previous board of directors of Viacom were George S. Abrams, David Andelman, Joseph Califano, Jr., William Cohen, Philippe Dauman, Alan C. Greenberg, Charles Phillips, Shari Redstone, Sumner Redstone (deceased), Frederic Salerno, William Schwartz, and Robert D. Walter.

Following the Viacom/CBS split, the Viacom board consisted of George S. Abrams, Philippe Dauman, Thomas E. Dooley, Ellen V. Futter, Robert Kraft, Alan Greenberg, Charles Phillips, Sumner Redstone (chairman), Shari Redstone (non-executive vice-chair), Frederic Salerno, and William Schwartz. As of 2010, the Board consisted of George Abrams, Philippe Dauman, Thomas E. Dooley, Alan Greenberg, Robert Kraft, Blythe McGarvie, Bob Bakish, Charles Phillips, Shari E. Redstone, Sumner Redstone, Frederic Salerno, and William Schwartz.

== See also ==
- List of conglomerates
- Paramount Communications
