= Chris McCarthy (executive) =

American entrepreneur and media executive

- Born: 1975 (age 50–51); Pennsylvania
- Education: Drexel University (BS); University of Pennsylvania (MBA)
- Occupation: Media executive
- Employer: Paramount Global
- Title: Interim principal executive officer, Office of the CEO, Paramount Global; President and CEO, Showtime & MTV Entertainment Studios

Chris McCarthy is an American media executive who served as the co-interim principal executive officer of Paramount Global.

He was one of three executives leading the office of the chief executive officer for the company and the president and chief executive officer of Showtime Networks and MTV Entertainment Studios, where he oversees multiple brands, including MTV, Showtime, Comedy Central, and the Paramount Network.

== Early life and education ==
McCarthy grew up in Levittown, Pennsylvania. His parents both worked two jobs, his father at a chemical plant and as a janitor, his mother at a steel mill and a mall. McCarthy began working at Chick-fil-A in his teens, becoming manager at 16. Seeking to leave Levittown, he enrolled at Drexel University and received a bachelor of science degree in engineering and commerce from in 1998, then a master of business administration degree from Wharton Business School at the University of Pennsylvania in 2003.

== Career ==
McCarthy worked for McNeil Consumer Healthcare and chemical company Ciba-Geigy in production and marketing after graduation. A gay man, he developed a strong interest in reality television while in college, and noted to The Hollywood Reporter that The Real World showed him what life could be like if he were open about his sexuality. He met with Jeff Probst and together pitched two shows to VH1 and CMT. The latter, Gone Country, ran for four seasons. McCarthy started working for Viacom in 2004. His first position with the company was as a freelancer marketing MTVU-branded credit cards to college students, eventually becoming the marketing head for MTVU. He was promoted to general manager of the MTV2 network in 2010 and Logo in 2014. Under McCarthy's leadership, MTV2 rose in popularity with the 12 to 24-year-old male demographic, from 21st to 5th, while Logo's viewer base grew for 10 consecutive quarters.

McCarthy was named general manager of VH1 in 2015 and president of MTV, VH1 and Logo in 2016. He has been credited with increasing ratings at each network by making rapid changes, a process he described as being akin to "driving while changing the wheels." McCarthy became president of CMT in 2018 and launched several initiatives to make the network's programming more inclusive.

Following the Viacom and CBS merger in 2019 and several internal reorganizations, McCarthy was named president of MTV Entertainment Group, where his purview expanded to include Paramount Network, Comedy Central, TV Land, Smithsonian Channel and Pop TV. In 2021, he was named chief executive officer of the MTV Entertainment Group and added oversight of global properties to his responsibilities. McCarthy renegotiated a contract with Dave Chappelle after Chappelle asked for Chappelle's Show to be removed from streaming platforms, as his previous contract did not provide additional compensation for the show being placed on those platforms. Chappelle thanked McCarthy for renegotiating the contract and returning the license to the show to him.

As head of the group, McCarthy has expanded several franchises, including making a deal with South Park creators Trey Parker and Matt Stone to create new seasons of the show and movies based on the show for Paramount+, reaching two agreements with Yellowstone co-creator Taylor Sheridan to develop the Yellowstone franchise, including 1883 and Mayor of Kingstown, and greenlighting Acapulco Shore and The Challenge: War of the Worlds to expand the Jersey Shore and The Challenge franchises. He has been credited with "revitalizing" MTV by rebooting Jersey Shore and creating Floribama Shore, as well as greenlighting a number of shows, including a reboots of Beavis and Butt-head and spinoff of Daria that was not released to the public after completion. McCarthy has also been credited with lengthening The Daily Show and bringing John Mulaney & the Sack Lunch Bunch to Comedy Central, although the latter did not materialize. McCarthy began overseeing Showtime Networks in January 2023 and merged Showtime's streaming service with Paramount+ and the organization with MTV Entertainment Studios. In April 2024, McCarthy, with Brian Robbins and George Cheeks, became one of three executives leading the Office of the CEO for Paramount Global. For regulatory purposes regarding the practices of the SEC, McCarthy was named as the "interim principal executive officer" of the company.

McCarthy served on the board of the Peabody organization. McCarthy received Emmy Awards at the 42nd and 44th Daytime Creative Arts Emmy Awards for Laverne Cox Presents: The T Word and Out of Iraq, respectively.

In 2024, McCarthy was ranked Number 3 on Fortune's 2024 LGBTQ+ Leaders list.

== Social impact ==
McCarthy has emphasized diversity, equity, inclusion, and social justice causes during his leadership, including creating the first-ever gender-neutral acting award for the MTV Movie & TV Awards and renaming the MTV Video Music Awards statuette the "Moon Person" to be more inclusive. In 2021, MTV hosted its European Music Awards in Hungary, honoring LGBTQ+ activists at the ceremony to counter anti-LGBTQ+ laws passed earlier that year.

McCarthy has also pushed to address how mental health is portrayed on the brands he oversees. He brought together a team of media industry and mental health professionals to write a guide on creating responsible mental health representations in 2021. McCarthy also organized internal workshops within Paramount Global on mental health representations and panels with other industry members to discuss mental health portrayals as part of the Better Together Storytelling Summit.

McCarthy and chief creative officer Nina L. Diaz have pushed for increased diversity and inclusivity among their content producers, starting a $250 million initiative to hire more diverse creators for the networks' shows and launching the First-Time Directors Program to produce more movies from BIPOC and women filmmakers.
