= Cabletelevision Advertising Bureau =

US cable TV network organization

The CableTelevision Advertising Bureau (CAB) is an organization of national and local ad-supported cable TV networks in the United States.
