= History of VH1 =

Historical timeline

VH1's current logo since 2016 with the wordmark been introduced in 2013.

VH1 is an American basic cable television channel owned by the MTV Entertainment Group sub-division of Paramount Media Networks division of Paramount Skydance. Launched on January 1, 1985, VH1 (which was an acronym for Video Hits One) originally focused on music and, later, pop culture-related programming aimed at older audiences than its sibling channel MTV. The network currently targets African-American audiences with original reality television programming, and unscripted comedies.

== Early history (1985–1994) ==
=== Format and VJs (1985–89) ===
The first VH1 logo used from 1985 to 1987 in the USA; between 1995 and 2002 in Germany and 1994–1999 in the UK and Ireland. Designed by LPG/Pon, Dale Pon and George Lois.

The second VH1 logo used from 1987 to 1994. Designed by Scott Miller. During the Christmas season the "V" would be flipped upside down to resemble a Christmas tree. This was a rare logo. Also, it is an alternate logo.

VH1, an acronym for Video Hits One, launched on January 1, 1985, over the channel space of Turner's Cable Music Channel. The channel originally focused on music and programming aimed at older audiences than its sibling channel at the time, MTV.

When the channel was first announced in 1984, it was originally named MTV 2 (unrelated to the actual MTV2 that was later launched in 1996), before settling on the present name VH1 (stands for Video Hits One).

VH1's aim was to focus on the lighter, softer side of popular music, including American and foreign musicians such as Olivia Newton-John, Kenny Rogers, Carly Simon, Tina Turner, Elton John, Billy Joel, Eric Clapton, Sting, Donna Summer, Rod Stewart, Kenny G, Michael Bolton, Anita Baker, Chicago, and Fleetwood Mac, in hopes of appealing to people aged 18 to 35, and possibly older. Also frequently featured in the network's early years were "videos" for Motown and other '60s oldies consisting of newsreel and concert footage. It was introduced on January 1, 1985, with the video performance of "The Star-Spangled Banner" by Marvin Gaye, who died a year before the network launched (the national anthem was also played at the launch of Cable Music Channel) It was programmed to fit many of the radio formats popular with adults at the time including soft rock, smooth jazz, oldies, and adult contemporary.

From the start, Video Hits One was branded as an urban version of its sister/parent channel. It played more jazz and R&B artists than MTV and had a higher rotation of urban-contemporary performers. Its early on-camera personalities were New York radio veterans Don Imus (then of WNBC), Frankie Crocker (then program director and DJ for WBLS), Scott Shannon (of WHTZ), Jon Bauman ("Bowzer" from Sha Na Na), and Rita Coolidge.

Later VJs included Bobby Rivers, who joined in 1987, Tim Byrd of WPIX-FM (the current day FM rebroadcast of WFAN), a station whose eclectic ballad-and-R&B oriented format mirrored that of VH-1, Roger Rose - Actor and comedian (Ski Patrol), and Alison Steele ("The Nightbird" of WNEW-FM). Rosie O'Donnell later joined the outlet's VJ lineup. O'Donnell would also host a comedy show featuring several comedians each episode. In November 1990, JAM Creative Productions in Dallas, which had made jingles for radio stations around the world, produced a set of customized jingles for the network, with performers in the videos lip-syncing to them.

The format left room for occasional ad-libs by the VJ, a godsend for emcees such as Imus and O'Donnell.

Typical of VH1's very early programming was New Visions, a series which featured videos and in-studio performances by smooth jazz and classical and new-age bands and performers, including Spyro Gyra, Andy Narell, Mark Isham, Philip Glass, and Yanni. At first many different musicians guest-hosted the program, but eventually musician/songwriter Ben Sidran became the permanent host.

New Age music videos continued to play on the channel into the 1990s. They would be seen on the Sunday morning two-hour music video block titled Sunday Brunch.

On August 27, 1985, parent company Warner Communications sold 31% of VH1 and its siblings (MTV and Nickelodeon; which were already divested by Warner into MTV Networks) to Viacom. Viacom would eventually buy the remaining 69% of MTV Networks from Warner for $326 million on May 20, 1986.

=== Early programming (1989–1994) ===
Once VH1 established itself a few years later, they catered to Top 40, adult contemporary, classic rock, and 1980s mainstream pop. For a time, even country music videos aired in a one-hour block during the afternoons. They started out using MTV's famous Kabel-based credits for their music video credit tags. It was later replaced in 1991 by a larger, vertically oriented font, with the year the video was made added to the lower column that identified the label on which the album was released. In 1993, the name of the videos' director was included at the bottom of the credits.

During this time, they also had some non-music programming, such as a comedy hour hosted by Rosie O'Donnell with various amateur and veteran comedians, called Stand Up Spotlight, an in-depth look at current movies called Flix, and reports on good civilians and volunteers in the community, called Good News People.

Every week, the Top 21 Video Countdown usually had a different guest host. Occasionally, they had themed countdowns as well, such as Elvira hosting creepy videos for Halloween in 1991.

Long blocks of music videos by a particular artist or band, theme, or years were also very popular in this era. One popular weekend program was called Video Rewind, in which blocks of 1980s videos from one particular year would play for an hour. There was also a short-lived hour-long program called By Request in which viewers could call a 1–900 hotline number to request their videos.

Another program was "History of Music Videos A to Z", which would include mini-marathons of videos mostly centered around artists based on a given alphabetical letter. During Independence Day weekends all the way to 1998, a large percentage of their library of music videos would be shown. A weeknight 11 p.m. hour-long broadcast of Madonna videos, titled The Madonna Show, aired around that era. The videos were aired without introduction by a VJ and the program was soon shortened to thirty minutes, and then scrapped altogether.

Also in 1991, a popular morning program was introduced called Hits News & Weather that ran from 7 am to 9 am ET. (It later expanded to 10 am ET.) It was composed of music videos both past and present along with a 90-second update of the day's news & weather provided by All News Channel. The updates were typically shown twice an hour during the program. A box displaying the minutes past the hour was shown below the logo during the period. It was discontinued a week before the channel was re-branded in the Fall of 1994. During the week prior, classic music videos from forgotten artists/bands aired, titled Whatever Happened To...?

The channel's playlist was gradually expanding, and, by 1994, included contemporary musicians such as Ace of Base, Melissa Etheridge, Sheryl Crow, Lisa Loeb, Amy Grant, Seal, and other slightly heavier, or more alternative rock-influenced music than what it had originally played, although favorites such as Whitney Houston, Mariah Carey, Rod Stewart, Cher, Elton John, Madonna, Phil Collins, Janet Jackson, and Céline Dion still continued to receive heavy play for several more years as well. VH1 to One was a program in the Video Hits One era that was very similar to Behind The Music. It profiled artists such as Phil Collins, Michael Bolton, and Paul McCartney, plus other various artists of interest at the time that were playing the network's chosen style of music at the time and their music careers. It was one of the programs that would continue into the incoming Music First era.

=== VH1 Corvette Give-away Sweepstakes ===
In order to reach a wider and younger audience, VH1 announced in late 1989 that in 1990 they would be holding a contest where the grand prize was a collection of 36 Chevrolet Corvettes, one for every model year from its introduction year of 1953, to the then current model year of 1989 (there is no model for 1983), all going to a single grand winner. All cars were to be certified as roadworthy and in "good" to "excellent" condition. The collection at the time had an estimated worth of over US$1 million. Contestants entered by calling a 1-900 number and registering, at $2 per call. VH1 received over 4 million call-in entries. The winner was a man from Long Island, New York, who immediately sold the entire collection to artist Peter Max for $500,000. Max intended to use the cars for an art project, but it never got started and the entire collection was left in an underground parking lot in New York City for over 20 years, and deteriorated into poor condition.

== VH1: Music First (1994–2003) ==
The third VH1 logo used from 1994 to 2003. The circle ring surrounding the logo was added in 1998. It was used on VH1 Classic UK from 2004 to 2010, VH1 Classic US from 2000 to 2007, and VH1 Classic Europe from 2004 to 2020.

On October 17, 1994, VH1 re-branded itself as VH1: Music First, following a slight ratings decline in the early 1990s. By 1996, VH1 was heading down the same path as its sister channel, MTV, choosing to focus more on music-related shows rather than just music videos. Additionally, the network began to expand its playlist of music videos to include more rock music. Old episodes of American Bandstand could regularly be seen on the channel. By that time, the channel's ratings were beginning to fall.

=== Video Countdown ===
As part of VH-1's re-branding as "VH1: Music First" in 1994, the channel launched a new series, the VH1 Top 10 Countdown, replacing the old Top 21 Countdown, that counted down the top 10 music videos played on VH1 each week. A combination of record sales, radio airplay, video spins, message board posts, and conventional mail would decide the order of the countdown. A rotating cast of VJs picked up hosting duties for the show over the years. The series expanded from 10 to 20 music videos, becoming the VH1 Top 20 Video Countdown, in 2001. In early 2015, the show was renamed The 20 and discontinued later that year.

=== Pop-Up Video ===
In Fall 1996, VH1 premiered Pop-Up Video, in which music videos were accompanied by "pop-ups" (also known as "bubbles" or "info nuggets")—small enclosed areas of the screen containing facts about the band artists, and videos such as career highlights, discography, biographical details, quotes, and anecdotes. For a time, this was VH1's highest rated show.

=== VH1 Storytellers ===
In February 1996, VH1 again hit it big with the premiere of the first of the network's flagship shows, VH1 Storytellers. The show began with a broadcast of Ray Davies, during his "Storyteller" tour, and took its name from this first show. In each hour-long episode, artists appear in front of a (mostly small and intimate) live audience, interspersing musical performances with anecdotes related to the songs' meaning, the songwriting process, audience reaction, etc. Along with Davies, the series has featured a widely diverse list of artists, including Culture Club, Stone Temple Pilots, Willie Nelson, Johnny Cash, Kanye West, Tom Waits, and Def Leppard. Meat Loaf enjoyed the show's format so much that he bought the stage decorations from VH-1 and went on to do a "Storytellers" tour in 1998/1999.

=== Behind the Music ===
VH1 scored another hit in August 1997 with the debut of Behind the Music. The hour-long show features interviews and biographies of some of popular music's biggest stars qualified to be profiled on the series. The premiere episode featured Milli Vanilli. Episodes have ranged from Aaliyah to Stryper to Keith Moon, as well as others such as, Meat Loaf, Tori Amos, MC Hammer, Cher, Oasis, Steppenwolf, Fleetwood Mac, TLC, "Weird Al" Yankovic, Megadeth, Britney Spears, Selena, Petra, Pantera, and Eminem, with more episodes being produced periodically. By late 1996, the show began to run out of artists to profile, leading to the short-lived BTM2 program, half-hour looks into bands and artists whose popularity was rising, but not yet at its peak.

=== Legends ===
Shortly after, VH1 created a companion series, Legends (originally sponsored by AT&T), profiling artists who have made a more significant contribution to music history to qualify as "Legends" (that is, those artists who have gone beyond the category of Behind the Music biographies). The artists profiled have included Aerosmith; the Bee Gees; David Bowie; Johnny Cash; Eric Clapton; The Clash; George Clinton; Sam Cooke; Crosby, Stills, Nash & Young; The Doors; John Fogerty; Aretha Franklin; Marvin Gaye; The Grateful Dead; Guns N' Roses; Jimi Hendrix; Michael Jackson; Eminem; Elton John; Janis Joplin; B.B. King; Led Zeppelin; John Lennon; Curtis Mayfield; Nirvana; Pink Floyd; The Pretenders; Red Hot Chili Peppers; Queen; Bruce Springsteen; Tina Turner; U2; Stevie Ray Vaughan; The Who, and Neil Young.

=== Save The Music Foundation ===
Founded in 1997 (until 2017) by John Sykes as VH1 Save The Music and funded by the first Divas concerts, the Save The Music Foundation became a standalone 501(c)(3) nonprofit in 2008. The mission of the organization is to help students, schools, and communities reach their full potential through the power of making music. Save The Music partners with school districts and raises funds to restore music programs in public schools. Since inception, STM has donated over $60 million worth of new musical instruments, equipment, and technology to 2,201 schools in 277 school districts around the country, reaching hundreds of thousands of students.

=== VH1 Divas ===
In 1998 (until 2016), VH1 debuted the first annual VH1 Divas concert and featured the "divas" Aretha Franklin, Mariah Carey, Shania Twain, Gloria Estefan, and Celine Dion, and the "special guest" Carole King. The second installment of these "diva" shows was produced in 1999 featuring Whitney Houston, Tina Turner, Cher, LeAnn Rimes, Mary J. Blige, Billy Joel, Chaka Khan, Brandy, and special "divo" Elton John. It became a huge success and was featured in the following years starring Diana Ross, Donna Summer, Destiny's Child, Kelly Clarkson, Jordin Sparks, Miley Cyrus, Jennifer Hudson, Shakira, Deborah Harry, Anastacia, Dixie Chicks, Gladys Knight, Patti LaBelle, and Jessica Simpson. Also in 1999, Donna Summer who was asked to do the "diva" concert, was given her own concert special by VH1 "Donna Summer Live and More: Encore". Some female artists such as Whitney Houston, Mariah Carey, Aretha Franklin, Mary J. Blige, Celine Dion, Cher, Chaka Khan, and Billy Joel were featured in two or more VH1 divas concerts, with Cyndi Lauper appearing the most times, having been featured in four concerts. In 2000, Diana Ross, who has been asked several times to appear on previous editions, appeared in her own edition of the special, "VH1 Divas 2000: A Tribute To Diana Ross".

=== Movies That Rock ===
In 1999, VH1 aired its first original movie, a biopic on Sweetwater. Their third original movie (which aired in 2000), Two of Us, focused on a fictional meeting between John Lennon and Paul McCartney. Over the next three years, they made over a dozen movies, including bio-pics on Jim Morrison and The Doors, Ricky Nelson, MC Hammer, The Monkees, Meat Loaf, and Def Leppard.

VH1 continues to air "Movies That Rock" on a regular basis, expanding to include movies not produced by VH1. The subject matter remains mostly focused on music and musicians.

=== Diversification ===
In the late 1990s, VH1's music choices became more diversified and teen-oriented. The network would update its 1994 "Big 1" logo during this period. Various late-night rock shows have been shown on VH1, featuring alternative rock and metal videos from the 1980s and 1990s. VH1 eventually warmed up to harder rock acts such as the Red Hot Chili Peppers, the Foo Fighters, the Stone Temple Pilots, and Metallica. Their new videos began being added into VH1's playlist right away.

Three spinoff channels, VH1 Soul (now rebranded as BET Soul), VH1 Smooth (later to be known as VH1 Classic and MTV Classic) & VH1 Country (later to be known as CMT Pure Country and CMT Music), launched on August 1, 1998.

Around late 2002, VH1 began to play mainstream rap musicians. The latest videos by Eminem, Nelly, Jay-Z, Snoop Dogg, Busta Rhymes, Missy Elliott, and Eve began to be shown in VH1's rotation and even started to cut up on VH1's top 20 countdown. VH1 also plays music from Latin artists such as Ricky Martin, Marc Anthony, Enrique Iglesias, Thalía, and Shakira.

=== Other past trends ===
rockDocs was the title under which VH1 aired various music documentaries, both those produced by VH1 and those produced by third parties. Such documentary series produced by VH1 include "And Ya' Don't Stop", a five-part series on the history of hip-hop and rap, a four-part series on the history of heavy metal, Heavy: The Story of Metal, and The Drug Years, which tells the story of different drug cultures that changed America. Films produced by other studios have also been aired as rockDocs, including Woodstock, Madonna: Truth or Dare, Tupac: Resurrection, Metal: A Headbanger's Journey, Awesome; I Fuckin' Shot That!, a documentary on the Beastie Boys, and most recently Last Days of Left Eye which documented the last month of Lisa Lopes's life from the band TLC, and N.W.A.: The World's Most Dangerous Group, featuring the narration of comedian Chris Rock, which chronicled the rise and fall of N.W.A.

VH1 endured criticism for Music Behind Bars, which mainly focuses on musicians in custody. Critics have claimed prisoners, mainly those convicted of murder, should not be entitled to any exposure, especially nationally.

The channel aired Where Are They Now? from 1999 to 2002. It featured former celebrities and their current professional and personal status. Each episode was dedicated to a specific genre, ranging from past child stars to Aaron Spelling's notable productions, to controversial news figures.

VH1 also aired a series of promos in 2003, featuring animated kittens from the online animation website Rathergood, lip-synching popular songs such as "I Love Rock n' Roll" written & performed by Alan Merrill of the Arrows since 1975 (US cover hit by Joan Jett in 1982), Culture Club's "Karma Chameleon" and Guns N' Roses' "Welcome to the Jungle". These spots were done by London-based animator Joel Veitch.

== Box logo era (2003–2013) ==
The fourth VH1 logo used from 2003 to 2013. VH1 Classic used the wordmark until 2016. VH1 international channels also used the logo, with the Indian version of VH1 still using the logo until it was shut down.

In August 2003, the network changed its focus again, dropping "Music First" from its name, and introducing a box logo. Having saturated its Behind The Music series (and spinoff BTM2, a 30-minute version that told the stories of current chart-toppers), gotten past the point of showing music videos on a regular basis, the network began to target the pop culture nostalgia market. Following the controversy over the murder-suicide of a contestant from Megan Wants a Millionaire, the channel toned down its reality programming. On July 1, 2007, VH1 and MHD simulcast the entire Concert for Diana live from London, England, on the birthday of Princess Diana, Princess of Wales.

VH1 would continue to air its music video blocks despite its decreasing reliance on such programming. Their main program block was seen from 3 a.m. to 11 a.m. ET. The overnight block was called Insomniac Music Theater which started in the music first era in 1999 and continued on, later renamed Nocturnal State in August 2005. At the beginning of October 2008, Nocturnal State was cut down to one hour, and Fresh: New Music was supplanted by additional hours of Jump Start. In 2010, VH1 retired Nocturnal State. Music Videos continued to be branded under Jump Start until January 5, 2013.

=== I Love… series (2002–2014) ===
In 2002, VH1 broadcast a ten-part series entitled I Love the '80s. The series was adapted from a BBC series, first broadcast in 2000, in which current entertainers and pop-culture figures offered their take on the trends, events, and personalities of another decade. The success of VH1's I Love the '80s, coupled with the growing nostalgia for ever-more-recent times, led the network to create an array of similarly themed programs. These ranged from 2003's I Love the '70s, to further variants like I Love the '80s Strikes Back, I Love the '90s, and I Love the '90s: Part Deux. More recently, VH1 premiered I Love the '80s 3-D and I Love the '70s: Volume 2. So eager was the network to capitalize on the trend while it was hot, that it devoted a series to the 2000s, despite the fact that the decade had not yet ended (I Love the New Millennium, broadcast in 2008, covered only the years 2000–2007). This was thought to be the final installment of the series until 2014, when I Love the 2000s continued the format.

The concept was broadened to include non-decade based installments, I Love the Holidays and I Love Toys. The format of these shows has also been reused for the weekly program Best Week Ever, the miniseries Black to the Future, which focuses on African-American pop culture, and the miniseries The Great Debate, which debates about pop culture.

=== The Greatest series ===
VH1 also produces its The Greatest series in which a similar format is used to countdown lists like "100 Greatest Artists of Rock and Roll", "The 50 Sexiest Video Moments", "100 Greatest Songs of Rock 'N' Roll", "100 Greatest Songs from the Past 25 Years", "100 Greatest One-hit Wonders", "100 Greatest Kid Stars", and "100 Greatest Teen Stars". In 2001, Mark McGrath hosted VH1's miniseries "100 Most Shocking Moments in Rock 'N' Roll", which compiled a list of the moments in music history that changed its course and shook its foundations. In late December 2009, an updated series titled "100 Most Shocking Music Moments" aired on VH1. In 2008 and early 2009, the channel premiered the "100 Greatest Hip-Hop Songs", "100 Greatest Hard Rock Songs", "100 Greatest Songs of the 90s", and "100 Greatest Songs of the 80s".

=== 40 Most Awesomely Bad ===
In 2004, VH1 began this mini-series category with "50 Most Awesomely Bad Songs...Ever", counting down the songs that were deemed horrible. Additional series in this group include "40 Most Awesomely Bad Dirrty Songs...Ever", "40 Most Awesomely Bad Break-up Songs...Ever", "40 Most Awesomely Bad #1 Songs...Ever", "40 Most Awesomely Bad Metal Songs...Ever", and "40 Most Awesomely Bad Love Songs".

=== Celebreality ===
In January 2005 VH1 launched its Celebreality programming block of reality shows featuring celebrities, anchored by The Surreal Life, which mimics MTV's The Real World, instead placing celebrities from the past into a living environment. The word "celebreality" is blend of the words "celebrity" and "reality" and is generally used to describe reality TV shows in which celebrities participate as subjects. The term appears to have been coined by Michael Gross, writing for The Toronto Star on May 12, 1991. In his article, entitled "Celebrity's New Face," Mr. Gross used a hyphenated form of the word ("celeb-reality") to describe the tendency of certain contemporary celebrities to downplay the traditional trappings of Hollywood glamour. "You could see the new celeb-reality on display at this year's Oscars," wrote Gross. "It is Kathy Bates and Whoopi Goldberg, not Kim Basinger and Michelle Pfeiffer. It is Jeremy Irons in black tie and the sneakers he says keep his feet on the ground. It is Kevin Costner, fighting small, important battles, winning big, but reacting with modesty and going off to party privately. The new celebrities are human first, famous second."

The next known citation of the word is by Joyce Millman, writing for The New York Times on January 5, 2003. In an article entitled, "Celebreality: The 'Stars' Are Elbowing Their Way In," Ms. Millman wrote: "Celebreality, the junk genre du jour, turns the notion of reality TV upside down. Instead of real people acting like celebrities on shows like "Survivor", "Big Brother" and "The Bachelor", celebreality gives us celebrities acting like real people on shows like "The Osbournes", "The Anna Nicole Show" and "Celebrity Boot Camp." I'm using the term "celebrity" loosely here—we're not talking about Russell Crowe, Julia Roberts and Dame Judi Dench eating bugs and scrubbing latrines. No, the celebrities of celebreality are a motlier crew, like, well, Mötley Crüe's Vince Neil, the former rap superstar M. C. Hammer and the wee ex-Michael Jackson ornament Emmanuel ("Webster") Lewis. Those three will be setting up housekeeping together on Thursday in "The Surreal Life" on WB, a celebreality spin on MTV's "Real World." Not to be outdone, ABC sends a Baldwin brother (Stephen), a supermodel (Frederique) and a former "L.A. Law" star (Corbin Bernsen) to Hawaii for "Celebrity Mole Hawaii", beginning Wednesday."

The VH1 Celebreality block has also aired shows such as:

- 2003: Surviving Nugent sent eight individuals to Ted Nugent's house to compete in various games and activities. One of the contestants was future reality show star Tila Tequila.
- 2005–2007: Hogan Knows Best is Hulk Hogan's reality show.
- 2005–2010: Celebrity Fit Club is a show where celebrities get in shape.
- 2005: Strange Love is a spin-off of The Surreal Life, following the relationship between Brigitte Nielsen and Flavor Flav.
- 2005–2008: My Fair Brady is another spin-off from The Surreal Life, which follows the relationship of Christopher Knight, who played Peter Brady on The Brady Bunch, and Adrianne Curry, who won the first season of America's Next Top Model.
- 2005–2006: Breaking Bonaduce covers the therapy and life of Danny Bonaduce.
- 2006–2007: Celebrity Paranormal Project features celebrities placed in haunted locations to explore and perform tasks.
- 2006–2008: Flavor of Love is a spin-off of Strange Love, where Flavor Flav tries to find love.
- 2007–2009: I Love New York, New York Goes to Hollywood, and New York Goes to Work feature Tiffany "New York" Pollard, from Flavor of Love.
- 2007: Flavor of Love Girls: Charm School is a spin-off of Flavor of Love
- 2007–2009: Rock of Love features Bret Michaels searching for love.
- 2007: Ego Trip's The (White) Rapper Show is a reality contest hosted by MC Serch.
- 2007–2008: The Salt-N-Pepa Show is a reality series following the 1990s rap duo Salt-N-Pepa.
- 2008–2009: Rock of Love: Charm School is a spin-off of Rock of Love with Bret Michaels
- 2008–2010: I Love Money is a spin-off of Flavor of Love, I Love New York, Real Chance of Love, and Rock of Love with Bret Michaels. There were four seasons of this show made altogether (seasons 1, 2, 3* and 4). The third season was cancelled due to contestant Ryan Jenkin's involvement in the murder of Jasmine Fiore, which took place in August 2009.
- 2008: ¡Viva Hollywood! featured Hispanic actors competing for a chance to star in a telenovela, hosted by Carlos Ponce and María Conchita Alonso.
- 2008: Ego Trip's Miss Rap Supreme is another reality contest hosted by MC Serch.
- 2008–2009: Real Chance of Love is a spin-off of I Love New York and I Love Money.
- 2008–2012: Celebrity Rehab with Dr. Drew, which chronicled a group of celebrities as they're treated for alcohol and drug addiction by Dr. Drew Pinsky and his staff at the Pasadena Recovery Center in Pasadena, California.
- 2008: Glam God with Vivica A. Fox is a reality show with red carpet diva Vivica A. Fox.
- 2008: The Cho Show is a reality sitcom following the antics of comedian Margaret Cho.
- 2009: Daisy of Love features Daisy de la Hoya, the runner-up of Rock of Love 2, in her own dating show spin-off.
- 2009: My Antonio is a reality series based on Antonio Sabato Jr.'s search for love.
- 2009: Charm School with Ricki Lake is a spin-off of Rock of Love Bus with Bret Michaels and Real Chance of Love.
- 2009: Megan Wants a Millionaire features Megan Hauserman from Rock of Love 2, I Love Money, and Rock of Love: Charm School in her own reality dating spin-off. The program was canceled in mid-August 2009, a third of the way through its run, due to show contestant Ryan Jenkins's involvement in the murder of Jasmine Fiore.
- 2010: Frank the Entertainer in a Basement Affair features Frank Maresca, a contestant from I Love New York 2, I Love Money, and I Love Money 2, in his own dating show spin-off.
- 2010: The Price of Beauty is a reality/documentary show featuring singer Jessica Simpson traveling the world.

=== Hip-Hop and Rock Honors ===
Since 2004, VH1 has showed their appreciation for hip-hop and rock music by honoring pioneers and movements. Hip-hop musicians honored include Eazy-E, LL Cool J, The Notorious B.I.G., 2Pac, and Public Enemy. All of the shows have been taped in the Hammerstein Ballroom in New York City. On May 25, 2006, Queen, Judas Priest, Def Leppard, and Kiss were the inaugural inductees into the VH1 Rock Honors in Las Vegas. The ceremony aired on VH1 six days later. In 2007, ZZ Top, Heart, Genesis, and Ozzy Osbourne were inducted into the VH1 Rock Honors. 2008's only Rock Honors inductees were The Who.

=== For What It's Worth ===
For What It's Worth premiered on February 21, 2013, and only lasted the length of one season. The show featured hosts Gary Dell'Abate and Jon Hein appraising music and pop-culture memorabilia. The first episode featured musician Jack White at Third Man Records in Nashville, Tennessee, discussing a format of vinyl record he invented called the "Triple Decker Record". The show also chose Gary Sohmers, an appraiser from PBS's Antiques Roadshow, to be an expert appraiser on all six episodes.

=== Breakfast television ===
Starting in 2011, VH1 has broadcast Big Morning Buzz Live, a daily morning news and pop culture talk show hosted by Carrie Keagan, Jason Dundas and VH1 music expert Jim Shearer and, later, Nick Lachey. The show features entertainment news, celebrity interviews and musical performances. On June 3, 2013, VH1 premiered The Gossip Table, another live daily entertainment news program featuring five entertainment columnists presenting entertainment news and gossip. Both shows have since been cancelled.

=== VH1 Best Cruise Ever ===
From April 28 to May 2, 2011, from Tampa to Cozumel music fans could experience non-stop music performances from headliners Train, Lifehouse, Colbie Caillat, and The Script. Other bands include Alpha Rev, Civil Twilight, Mat Kearney, One eskimO, SafetySuit, Thriving Ivory, Trailer Park Ninjas, and Ryan Star. The cruise is on the Carnival Cruise Line ship Carnival Inspiration.

== "Plus" logo era (2013–2022) ==
VH1 logo used from 2013 until 2016, font still used in the updated 2016 version of the logo.

On January 5, 2013, VH1 introduced a new logo that closely resembles their first. The logo has a "plus" sign in it, representing VH1's focus on music-related shows and events and pop culture-based reality programming. The network's main video block was VH1 + Music, seen weekday mornings between 6 a.m. and 11 a.m. The new Nocturnal State block aired Mondays through Sundays between 3 a.m. and 6 a.m.

Since 2014, VH1 programming was noted to be shifting towards shows focused around African-American personalities, similar to BET and its sister networks (eight years until its acquisition). On December 28, 2015, oversight of spin-off music video channel VH1 Soul was moved to BET Networks, with the channel rebranding as BET Soul.

In the first quarter of 2016, VH1 announced its highest ratings in six years and it was then the fastest-growing subscription channel in that same period. Thanks to the success of shows like Love & Hip Hop, Stevie J & Joseline Go Hollywood, K. Michelle: My Life, and Mob Wives, the channel has moved ahead as a Top Five network for adults. Conversely, VH1 + Music was discontinued (like weekend's Top 20 Countdown) and replaced by reruns of 1990s–2000s sitcoms shared with Paramount's other networks. Since then, the channel only carries music videos in continuity between shows. During the same year, VH1 would also revive the former CW reality competition series America's Next Top Model.

VH1 has seen further shifts to its programming as part of its parent company's 2017 restructuring plan. Beginning with its ninth season, Logo TV original series RuPaul's Drag Race was moved to VH1. In 2019, as part of an expansion of MTV's Wild 'n Out, new episodes premiered on VH1 from July 7, 2019, to September 15, 2019.

== Shift to BET (2022–present) ==
On November 9, 2022, it was announced that oversight of VH1 would move to the BET Media Group under Scott Mills. The move reunited the network with BET Soul (rebranded recently seven years ago), while also splitting them from MTV and its siblings (including the formerly-named VH1 Classic and VH1 Country). On December 12, 2022, it was announced that future Drag Race seasons would move to MTV, though the Celebrity edition would remain on VH1.

In April 2023, it was announced that Love & Hip Hop: Atlanta would move to MTV for its eleventh season; which premiered on June 13, 2023.
