= Soccer on CBS Sports =

American live sports program

- Genre: Soccer telecasts
- Theme music composer: Helmut Vonlichten
- Opening theme: TNF 32 (CBS Thursday Night Football Theme) by VonLichten
- Country of origin: United States
- Original language: English

Production
- Camera setup: Multi-camera
- Running time: 3+ hours (or until game ends)
- Production company: CBS Sports

Original release
- Network: CBS, CBS Sports Network, CBS All Access/Paramount+ and CBS Sports Golazo Network

Soccer on CBS Sports is a number of television programs that have aired soccer matches in the United States on CBS, CBS Sports Network, Paramount+ (formerly CBS All Access) and CBS Sports Golazo Network. These matches are from International, European, and American competitions.

== Current programming ==
=== UEFA club competitions ===
In November 2019, CBS acquired rights to UEFA club competitions, including the UEFA Champions League, Europa League, and UEFA Super Cup for three seasons beginning in the 2021–22 season, replacing Turner Sports. The package would center around the CBS All Access (now Paramount+) subscription service, which carries all matches live, with selected matches to be carried by the main CBS network. CBS Sports Network largely carries The Golazo Show on matchdays, a "whiparound" show that airs goals and important moments from all matches in a broadcast window. Its name is a reference to "CBS Sports Golazo", the branding used by the network on social media to promote their men's soccer programming. CBS's studio coverage for the Champions League is produced from IMG's studio in Stockley Park, London in association with network-owned Channel 5.

During the suspension of the 2019–20 season due to the COVID-19 pandemic in Europe, Turner Sports dropped out of its contract with UEFA. CBS would pick up the remainder of the contract and begin its coverage early, beginning from the remaining round of 16 matches in August 2020. On August 19, 2022, UEFA extended the deal with CBS until 2030.

=== National Women's Soccer League ===
On March 11, 2020, the NWSL announced that it has entered into a three-year media agreement with CBS Sports and the video game-oriented streaming service Twitch. For the 2020 NWSL season, CBS Sports will broadcast 87 matches (including the playoffs) split between CBS, CBS Sports Network, and CBS All Access in Canada and the United States, with the exact distribution among the channels subject to change, while Twitch will stream an additional 24 matches for free. Twitch will also become the NWSL's international media rights holder and stream all matches outside Canada and the United States for free.

On November 9, 2023, the NWSL announced a new multi-year deal with CBS Sports. On CBS and streaming on Paramount+, CBS Sports will air at least 10 regular season matches, one quarterfinal, one semifinal, and the championship. Eight matches will air exclusively on CBS Sports Network.

=== CONCACAF ===
Paramount+ will offer more than 200 matches from the CONCACAF region, airing English-language rights of Nations League Finals in June 2021 including United States matches, and CONCACAF Men's and Women's World Cup qualifiers, except U.S. and Mexico home matches.

=== Brasileirāo and Argentine Primera División ===
CBS will stream more than 360 matches a year from Brazil's top-tier Campeonato Brasileiro Série A and more than 300 matches a year from Argentina's Primera División Argentina in English-language on Paramount+.

=== AFC ===
CBS reached an agreement with Asian Football Confederation to acquire the exclusive U.S. rights for several competitions, including Men's World Cup qualifying, Men's Champions League, Men's Asian Cup, Women's Club Championship and Women's Asian Cup (which is also becoming their Women's World Cup qualification). These coverage are expected to begin in the fall of 2021 on Paramount+.

=== Serie A ===
CBS acquired rights of Serie A, replacing ESPN, for three seasons beginning in 2021-22 until 2023–24. More than 400 club matches will be on Paramount+, featuring 380 Serie A matches, 25 Coppa Italia matches—including selected knockout rounds, and the Supercoppa Italiana match each year. Select matches will airing on other CBS Sports platforms, including CBS Sports Network. For the first two weeks, CBS' studio coverage will be based from CBS Sports HQ studio in Stamford, Conn. Additional coverage details will be announced in later date with full studio coverage from CBS Broadcast Center in New York City beginning on Sunday, Sept. 12.

=== Scottish Professional Football League ===
CBS replaced ESPN as the U.S. rights holder of the Scottish Premiership after reaching a multi-year deal beginning from 2021–22 until 2024-25 season. The majority of the matches, including the Scottish Championship and the Scottish League Cup, will air on Paramount+ with select matches, including Old Firm derby are shown on CBS Sports Network.

=== FA Women's Super League ===
CBS was awarded a multi-year contract to broadcast the FA Women's Super League beginning in 2022–23 seasons. A total of 57 matches are scheduled to be aired selectively on the CBS Sports Network and the majority can be accessed via Paramount+.

=== English Football League ===
CBS Sports holds the rights to the English Football League, including 135 Championship matches, 38 League One matches, 38 League Two matches, 30 Carabao Cup matches and 3 Bristol Street Motors Trophy matches per season, through the 2027–28 season.

=== Other rights ===
CBS Sports also holds the rights to some Liga MX teams (via TelevisaUnivision), Major Arena Soccer League, the CONCACAF W Champions Cup, the USL Championship, and USL League 1.

== On-air personalities ==
=== Play-by-play ===
- UEFA club competitions
  - UEFA Champions League and the UEFA Super Cup – Clive Tyldesley (lead), Andres Cordero, Chris Wyttingham, Pien Meulensteen
  - UEFA Europa League and UEFA Conference League – Andres Cordero, Chris Wittyngham
  - UEFA world feed (Gravity Media): Peter Drury (lead), Martin Tyler (UEFA Champions League only), Guy Mowbray, Dan Mason, Jonathan Pearce, Simon Brotherton, Sam Matterface, Kevin Keatings, Jim Proudfoot, Sam Wilson, Mark Scott
- Serie A – Andrés Cordero, Chris Wittyngham, Eric Krakauer
- CONCACAF – Andrés Cordero, Adrian Garcia Marquez, Lisa Byington
- National Women's Soccer League – Kate Scott, Jacqui Oatley, Jenn Hildreth, JP Dellacamera, Mike Watts, Aly Trost, Josh Eastern, Matt Pedersen, Maura Sheridan, Lisa Carlin, Joe Malfa, Chris Wittyngham, Eric Krakauer, Andres Cordero, Jessica Charman, Michael Wottreng

=== Color commentators ===
- UEFA club competitions
  - UEFA Champions League and the UEFA Super Cup – Robert Green (lead), Ray Hudson, Jim Beglin, Matteo Bonetti, Mike Grella, Karen Carney
  - UEFA Europa League and UEFA Europa Conference League – Matteo Bonetti
  - UEFA world feed (Gravity Media) (Note: UEFA Champions League only): Don Goodman (lead), Alan Smith, Andy Townsend, Leon Osman, Matt Holland, Clive Allen, Efan Ekoku, Stewart Robson, Sue Smith, Laura Bassett
- Serie A – Matteo Bonetti, Mike Grella, Ray Hudson
- CONCACAF – Maurice Edu, Marcelo Balboa, Aly Wagner, Janelly Farías
- National Women's Soccer League – Lori Lindsey, Aly Wagner, Heather O'Reilly, Anna Witte, Jill Loyden, Jordan Angeli, Lianne Sanderson, Tony Meola, Gary Bailey, Saskia Webber, Kacey White, Renee Washington, Freya Coombe, Merritt Mathias, Kyndra de St. Aubin

=== Reporters ===
- UEFA Champions League – Guillem Balagué, Jules Breach, Nico Cantor
- Serie A – Ana Quiles, Marco Messina
- CONCACAF – Nico Cantor, Jenny Chiu
- National Women's Soccer League – Marisa Pilla, Lisa Carlin

=== Studio hosts ===
- UEFA club competitions – Kate Scott, Jules Breach
  - Golazo Show – Nico Cantor, Manish Bhasin, Ayo Akinwolere, Pien Meulensteen
- Serie A – Poppy Miller
- CONCACAF – Kate Scott, Poppy Miller
- CBS Sports HQ – Poppy Miller

=== Studio analysts ===
- UEFA club competitions
  - UEFA Champions League and the UEFA Super Cup – Thierry Henry, Jamie Carragher, Micah Richards, Alessandro Del Piero, Peter Schmeichel, Alex Scott, Freddie Ljungberg
  - UEFA Europa and the Europa Conference Leagues – Lianne Sanderson, Jermaine Jones, Maurice Edu, Julien Laurens
- Serie A – Matteo Bonetti, Marco Messina, Fabrizio Romano, Giuseppe Rossi, Mike Grella, Charlie Davies, Antonio Cincotta, Christine Cupo, Aaron West
- CONCACAF – Clint Dempsey, Oguchi Onyewu, Charlie Davies, Briana Scurry, Kaylyn Kyle, Jenny Ruiz-Williams, Janelly Farías
- CBS Sports HQ – Ian Joy, Luis García, Jimmy Conrad, Heath Pearce, Thomas Rongen, Nigel Reo-Coker, Fabrizio Romano, James Benge, Jonathan Johnson
- Rules analyst – Christina Unkel

== Former programming ==
=== North American Soccer League ===
In 1967, two professional soccer leagues started in the United States: the FIFA-sanctioned United Soccer Association, which consisted of entire European and South American teams brought to the U.S. and given local names, and the unsanctioned National Professional Soccer League. The National Professional Soccer League had a national television contract in the U.S. with the CBS television network (which signed a two-year contract to broadcast a game every Sunday afternoon live and in color). The NPSL kicked off on Sunday, April 16 with a full slate of five matches. However, the ratings for matches were unacceptable even by weekend daytime standards and the arrangement was terminated. Bill MacPhail, head of CBS Sports, attributed NASL's lack of TV appeal to empty stadiums with few fans, and to undistinguished foreign players who were unfamiliar to American soccer fans.

The leagues merged in 1968 to form the North American Soccer League (NASL). It has been suggested that the timing of the merge was related to the huge amount of attention given throughout the English-speaking world to the victory by England in the 1966 FIFA World Cup and the resulting documentary film, Goal. While the USSF and FIFA refused to recognize the NPSL, the television contract with CBS guaranteed some element of financial stability.

In 1974, although the Los Angeles Aztecs had a league-best record and points total, and rightly should have hosted the championship final, CBS intervened and strongly influenced the NASL's decision to play the match in Miami. CBS was under contract to air the game live and was unwilling to black-out the large Southern California viewing audience. At the time it was the standard in many U.S.-based sports for the host market not to broadcast games locally unless they were sold out. At the time, the Los Angeles Memorial Coliseum had a capacity of 94,500 and, even in a best-case scenario, an Aztecs sell-out was unlikely. Moreover, in an effort by CBS to capture more viewers during the peak East Coast time slot, a Los Angeles-hosted game would have begun at 12:30 (PDT) local time. The league recognized that both these factors would be detrimental to ticket sales and agreed to move the game to the Miami Orange Bowl with a 3:30 (EDT) local start. CBS had also stepped in the previous week and forced the Toros to play their semifinal match at the much-smaller Tamiami Stadium in Tamiami Park. This was done so that if Miami did win, CBS's production crews would have a full week for set-up in the Orange Bowl stadium.

=== 1974 FIFA World Cup ===
By 1970, the NASL was struggling, and had lost its TV contract with CBS. As a result, they didn't provide any network TV coverage of the 1970 World Cup.

1974's coverage contained week-old filmed highlights on CBS Sports Spectacular. For the Final, CBS used BBC's feed with announcer David Coleman.

=== Major Indoor Soccer League ===
The MISL made inroads on national television in 1982–83. While the spring would see the end of the league's two-year deal with the USA Network, CBS would broadcast a playoff game live from Cleveland on May 7 that drew an estimated four million viewers. One game during the 1983–84 season was televised on CBS (Game 3 of the championship series on June 2) as well.

1984–85 would be the final year the MISL would have games aired on network television, CBS broadcast Game 4 of the championship series live on May 25. CBS used Gary Bender and Kyle Rote Jr. on commentary.

=== NCAA Men's Soccer Championship ===
By 1990, CBS would televise the final of the NCAA Division I Men's Soccer Tournament between UCLA Bruins and Rutgers Scarlet Knights. Mike Joy and Seamus Malin provided commentary, with Jim Gray serving as the sideline reporter.

== CBS Sports Golazo Network ==
CBS Sports Golazo Network
- Country: United States
- Broadcast area: United States
- Network: CBS Sports

Programming
- Language: English
- Picture format: 720p (HD VBR)

Ownership
- Owner: Skydance Corporation
- Parent: CBS Sports
- Sister channels: List: Nickelodeon; Nick Jr. Channel; Nicktoons; TeenNick; NickMusic; CBS; CBS Sports Network; CBS Sports HQ; CBS News 24/7; MTV; MTV2; MTV Tres; MTV Live; MTV Classic; BET; BET Gospel; BET Her; BET Hip-Hop; BET Jams; BET Soul; VH1; Comedy Central; TV Land; Logo; CMT; CMT Music; Pop TV; Showtime; The Movie Channel; Flix; Paramount Network; Smithsonian Channel

History
- Launched: April 11, 2023

Links
- Webcast: www.cbssports.com/watch/cbs-sports-golazo-network

The CBS Sports Golazo Network is a streaming video sports channel operated by the CBS Sports divisions of Skydance Corporation focused on soccer. The channel is available on the CBS Sports app, Pluto TV and Paramount+ along with Amazon's Freevee and Roku's Roku Channel. Featured programming includes three live studio shows, Morning Footy talk show on weekdays usually at 8AM ET, Box 2 Box news show on weekdays usually at 1PM ET, and the comprehensive highlights show Scoreline daily usually at 5pm ET with updated highlights (from MLS, NWSL, USL, CONCACAF and CONMEBOL competitions) throughout the evening as needed. CBS Sports Golazo Network also offers second-screen "tactical cam" or "isolation cam" (on a star player) coverage of major matches airing on CBS and select live matches from UEFA club competitions, Serie A, NWSL, USL, EFL, SPFL and the Argentine Primera División, alongside indoor formats such as MASL and Baller League USA.

=== On-air talent ===
==== Presenters ====
- Susannah Fuller
- Poppy Miller
- Aly Trost Martin
- Jenny Chiu
- Jimmy Conrad
- Lisa Carlin
- Claudia Pagán
- Hannah Cash
- Michelle Gingras
- Chris Wittyngham
- Nate Bukaty
- Callum Williams
- Adrian Garcia Marquez
- Julie Stewart-Binks
- Semra Hunter
- Sam Quek
- Charlie Webster
- Adam Hunt
- Adriana Monsalve

==== Analysts and contributors ====
- Nico Cantor
- Alexis Guerreros
- Charlie Davies
- Michael Lahoud
- Aaron West
- Ian Joy
- Tony Meola
- Brian McBride
- Nigel Reo-Coker
- Mike Grella
- Marco Messina
- Matteo Bonetti
- Sandra Herrera
- Darian Jenkins
- Midge Purce
- Kelley O'Hara
- Jessica McDonald
- Lianne Sanderson
- Christine Cupo
- Felipe Cárdenas
- Luis "Lucho" Garcia
- James Benge
- Francesco Porzio
- Mbizo Mzamane
- Guillem Balagué
- Anita Nneka Jones
- Geoff Shreeves
