= Skydance Global Cable Media =

American mass media division

- Formerly: Warner Cable Communications (1977–1979); Warner-Amex Satellite Entertainment (1979–1984); MTV Networks (1984–2011); Viacom Media Networks (2011–2019); ViacomCBS Domestic Media Networks (2019–2022); Paramount Media Networks (2022–2026)
- Type: Division
- Industry: Entertainment; Cable television; Satellite television
- Predecessor: Warner Bros. Discovery Global Linear Networks
- Founded: December 1, 1977; 48 years ago
- Founder: Robert Pittman
- Headquarters: 1515 Broadway, New York
- Key people: George Cheeks (Co-Chair and Chief Content Officer, Skydance TV); Channing Dungey (Chair, Skydance Global Cable Media and President, Warner Bros. Television Group)
- Brands: BET; BET Gospel; BET Her; BET Jams; BET Soul; Discovery Channel; TLC; Animal Planet; HGTV; Discovery Family; TBS; TruTV; Cartoon Network; Adult Swim; Boomerang; CMT; CMT Music; Comedy Central; Flix; Logo TV; MTV; MTV2; MTV Classic; MTV Live; MTV Tres; MTVU; Nick at Nite; Investigation Discovery; Science Channel; Nick Jr. Channel; Nickelodeon; Nicktoons; Paramount Network; Pop; Smithsonian Channel; TeenNick; The Movie Channel; TV Land; VH1
- Parent: Skydance TV
- Divisions: MTV Entertainment Group; The Cartoon Network, Inc.; BET Media Group; Nickelodeon Group; Skydance Television Animation

The logo for Warner-Amex Satellite Entertainment

The original prototype logo for MTV Networks

The final logo for MTV Networks

The logo for Viacom Media Networks

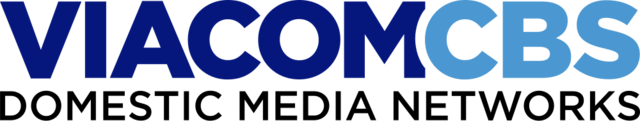
The first logo for ViacomCBS Domestic Media Networks

The second logo for ViacomCBS Domestic Media Networks

The logo for Paramount Media Networks

Skydance Global Cable Media is a division of Skydance TV, itself a division of Skydance that oversees the operations of its global cable television channels and brands. The division was originally founded as MTV Networks in 1984, named after MTV. It would then be known as Viacom Media Networks until 2019; ViacomCBS Domestic Media Networks until 2022; and Paramount Media Networks until 2026.

It is headed by Channing Dungey, and operates the cable networks of the former Warner Bros. Discovery (WBD) and those of Skydance prior to its acquisition of WBD. Its various networks include MTV, Discovery Channel, TLC, HGTV, Nickelodeon, TBS, TNT and Cartoon Network.

== History ==
=== Pre-launch: Warner Communications joint venture (1977–1984) ===
Warner Cable Communications was founded on December 1, 1977, by Warner Cable, itself a division of Warner Communications, predecessor to Warner Bros. Discovery (which was at the time WarnerMedia, and Discovery, Inc.), to launch QUBE, an interactive cable television system that mainly served in the Midwest state. Seeing the potential in the creation of new cable networks, Warner Cable divested QUBE's biggest brands: Star Channel (film), Pinwheel (youths) and Sight on Sound (music), into nationwide outlets. Star Channel began by satellite in January 1979 and was renamed as The Movie Channel by the end of the year. The original channel "C-3", by then known as Pinwheel, became Nickelodeon in April 1979. As a result of these actions, Warner Cable Communications would then be rebranded as Warner-Amex Satellite Entertainment, becoming a joint venture between Warner Cable and American Express.

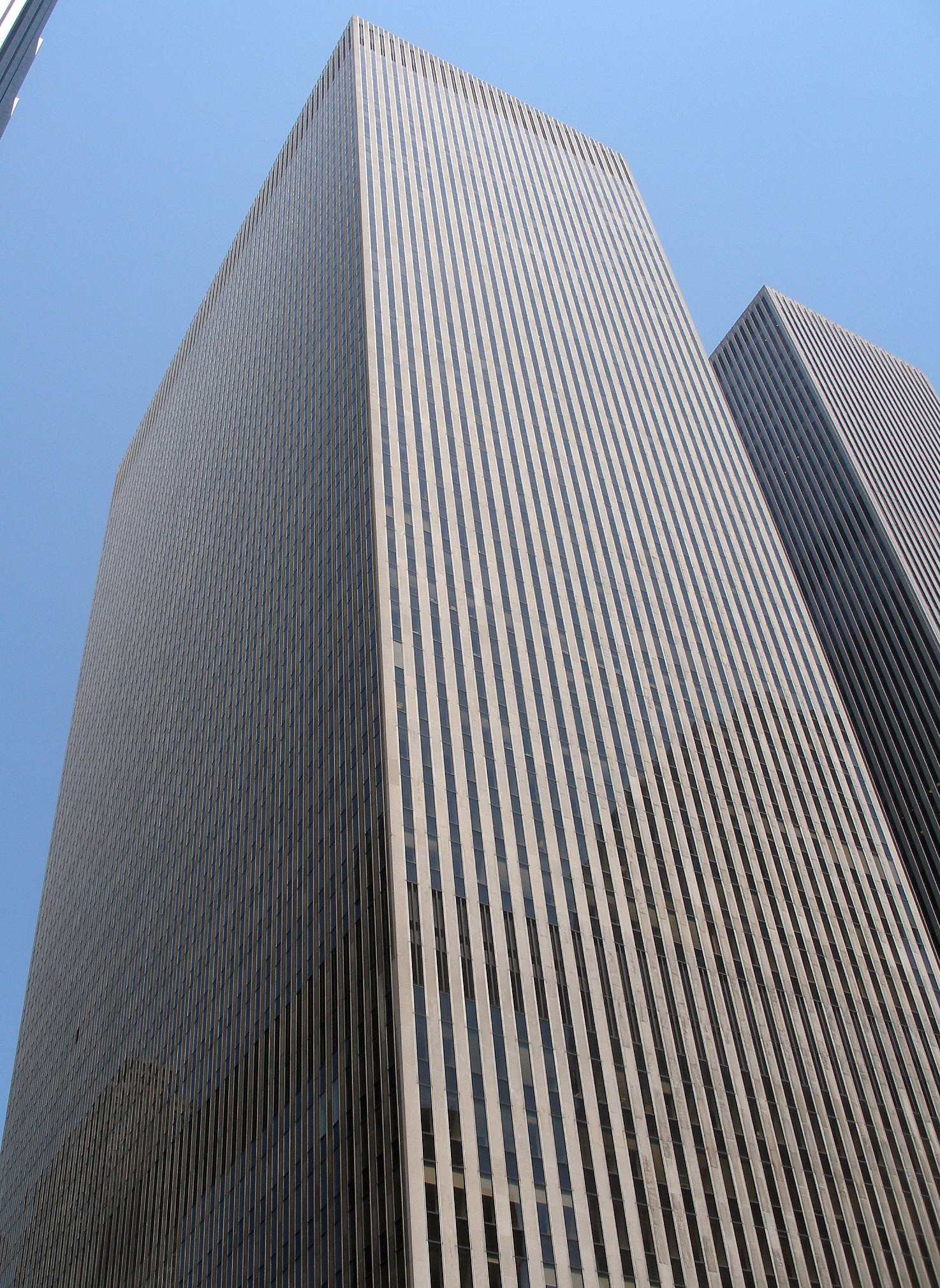
1211 Avenue of the Americas, headquarters of the company in early 1980s

In 1980, Warner-Amex formed a joint venture with the now-defunct Cablevision's Rainbow Media (now as AMC Networks) division to launch Bravo, a cable network dedicated to arts and films, on December 1, 1980. Because of the full control of the channel, however, was sold to Rainbow Media in 1984; NBC would acquire Bravo in 2003, and the channel is now currently owned by Comcast's NBCUniversal.

On August 1, 1981, all-video channel MTV first introduced. In 1983, concerned by the strategic and financial failure of its pay-TV venture The Movie Channel (began to reap the benefits when Time Inc. was having with HBO and Cinemax), WASEC established a joint venture with Viacom, merging TMC with their premium movie network Showtime to form Showtime/The Movie Channel, Inc.; WASEC, however, had no operational involvement in the joint venture.

=== Launch as MTV Networks, Viacom gets full ownership (1984–2011) ===
On June 25, 1984, Warner Communications made the decision to divest its assets to Warner-Amex Cable Entertainment and rebrand it as MTV Networks. A year later, Warner would acquire the 50% stake from American Express.

On August 27, 1985, Warner sold 31% of MTV Networks to Viacom, with Warner also selling 19% of its Showtime/The Movie Channel, Inc. joint to Viacom as well.

In November 1985, Viacom announced that it had plans to buy the remaining 69% of MTV Networks from Warner for $326 million, and the acquisition was completed on May 20, 1986.

In 1988, the company partnered with fellow Viacom division Viacom Enterprises to handle advertising sales of Superboy, a syndicated television series. The division was later evolved into One World Entertainment in the early 1990s, who partnered to launch a VH1-syndicated series. In 2003, MTV Networks assumed full ownership of Comedy Central from AOL Time Warner.

On December 31, 2005, the remnants of MTV Networks and Showtime Networks were separated following Viacom's split into two entities: CBS Corporation, which retained CBS, UPN, Simon & Schuster and Showtime Networks (Showtime, The Movie Channel, and Flix), and a spun-off company under the Viacom name, which took ownership of Paramount Pictures, BET Networks and MTV Networks (Comedy Central, MTV, Nickelodeon, and VH1).

=== Expansion (2011–2019) ===
MTV Networks was renamed Viacom Media Networks in 2011. In Fall 2012, media analysts began to report that ratings among some of Viacom's leading brands in the U.S. were experiencing declines in viewership. MTV, Comedy Central and Nickelodeon were of most concern to investors as the three account for roughly 50% of Viacom's operating profit, estimated David Bank of RBC Capital Markets.

In 2017, Viacom announced a five-point restructuring plan, in which the company would pour most of its resources behind six "flagship brands". These were MTV, Comedy Central, Nickelodeon, Nick Jr. Channel, BET, and film studio Paramount Pictures. In February 2017, cable channels CMT and TV Land were moved from the Kids and Family Group to the Global Entertainment Group under Kevin Kay, joining up with Spike TV. During the same month, it was announced that Spike would be relaunched as Paramount Network in 2018, aligning with the namesake film studio and being positioned as Viacom's main general entertainment outlet. BET Networks launched BET+ in September 2017.

In October 2018, Kevin Kay was announced to be leaving his position as head of the Entertainment Group. CMT was transferred from the Entertainment Group to the Music Group under president Chris McCarthy, with his exit. Executive Kent Alterman would take charge of Paramount Network and TV Land to go with his current leadership of Comedy Central and Bellator MMA.

In 2019, after acquiring the free streaming service Pluto TV, Viacom would launch several channels on the service branded after its Media Networks and company–owned IP.

=== Reintroduction and re-merger with CBS (2019–2024) ===
In August 2019, Viacom announced that it would merge with CBS Corporation, reuniting the two entities under the ViacomCBS name. The merger closed on December 4, 2019. Announced on November 11, 2019, as part of the re–merger, the Media Networks division was renamed ViacomCBS Domestic Media Networks, and re-organized.

MTV, VH1, CMT and Logo were re-organized into the "Entertainment & Youth Group", with the addition of Comedy Central, Paramount Network, Smithsonian Channel, and TV Land. BET Networks was merged with Showtime Networks under CEO David Nevins, who also temporarily gained oversight of Pop TV (formerly co-owned with Lionsgate); Pop TV was transferred to the Entertainment & Youth Group on January 15, 2020.

On February 16, 2022, ViacomCBS was renamed as Paramount Global, and ViacomCBS Domestic Media Networks was renamed Paramount Media Networks. In 2022, MTV Entertainment Group partnered with Second Chance Studios to help formerly incarcerated individuals launch media careers. On November 9, 2022, it was announced that oversight of VH1 would move to the BET Media Group under Scott Mills.

On May 9, 2023, Paramount restructured its U.S. domestic network business. Near the end of 2023, Paramount announced that the mobile apps for Nickelodeon, Nick Jr., MTV, Comedy Central, Paramount Network, and Showtime would cease operations at on January 31, 2024. The reason was to encourage users to sign up for Paramount+. The Nickelodeon Group shut down Noggin on July 2 of that same year for the same reason.

=== Paramount/Skydance merger; acquisition of Warner Bros. Discovery (2024–present) ===
On April 29, 2024, President and CEO Bob Bakish was replaced by Brian Robbins, George Cheeks, and Chris McCarthy. This action was the result of Bakish's reported opposition of the Skydance deal. McCarthy was legally designated the company's "interim principal executive officer" in order to comply with SEC regulations stipulating that one person must conduct "the normal course of business".

By July 2, 2024, Skydance renegotiated the deal and reached a preliminary agreement to acquire National Amusements and merge with Paramount. The deal was referred by National Amusements to Paramount's special committee. Also, Paramount reportedly entered talks for a sale of the BET Media Group to buyers led by BET CEO Scott Mills for $1.6-$1.7 billion. Paramount Global and Skydance Media officially merged on August 7, 2025, forming Paramount Skydance. Six days later, it was confirmed that BET Media Group was no longer up for sale and it was transferred from CBS Entertainment Group back to Paramount Media Networks.

On February 27, 2026, Paramount Skydance officially reached the historic deal agreement to acquire Warner Bros. Discovery (successor of Warner Communications), that would result in MTV, Nickelodeon, The Movie Channel, and VH1 being brought back under the same umbrella as Warner Bros. Entertainment for the first time in 40 years since the Warner-Amex Cable days. The deal was officially closed on October 6, 2026, and Paramount Skydance changed its legal name to Skydance.

On February 28, 2026, Netflix received a $2.8 billion breakup fee from Paramount Skydance after it withdrew its bid to acquire parts of Warner Bros. Discovery, paving the way for Paramount's takeover of the entire WBD's assets.

On November 17, 2026, Skydance restructured Paramount Media Networks and folded Warner Bros. Discovery Global Linear Networks into it, being renamed Skydance Global Cable Media. Channing Dungey divided the company's cable networks into unscripted lifestyle, broad-based entertainment, talent/music/live, and comedy/animation, alongside introducing a new division called Skydance Television Animation, which would include Skydance's animated television assets.

== Channels list ==
=== Current channels ===
Category	Name	Launch
CBS Entertainment Group
Flagship Networks Group	CBS	July 1, 1941
Flagship Networks Group	CBS Sports	April 11, 1955
Flagship Networks Group	CBS Sports Network	June 1, 2002
Flagship Networks Group	CBS Sports HQ	February 26, 2018
Flagship Networks Group	Start TV	September 3, 2018
Flagship Networks Group	Dabl	September 9, 2019
Showtime Networks
Premium Networks Group	Showtime	July 1, 1976
Premium Networks Group	Showtime 2	October 1, 1991
Premium Networks Group	Showtime Showcase	1996
Premium Networks Group	SHO×BET	September 1999
Premium Networks Group	Showtime Extreme	March 10, 1998
Premium Networks Group	Showtime Family Zone	March 2001
Premium Networks Group	Showtime Next	March 2001
Premium Networks Group	Showtime Women	March 2001
Premium Networks Group	The Movie Channel	April 1, 1973
Premium Networks Group	The Movie Channel Xtra	October 1, 1997
Premium Networks Group	Flix	August 1, 1992
BET Media Group
Black Entertainment Television, LLC	BET	July 1, 1983
Black Entertainment Television, LLC	BET Her	January 15, 1996
Black Entertainment Television, LLC	BET Gospel	July 1, 2002
Black Entertainment Television, LLC	BET Hip-Hop	July 2, 2002
Black Entertainment Television, LLC	BET Jams	May 1, 2002
Black Entertainment Television, LLC	BET Soul	August 1, 1998
Black Entertainment Television, LLC	VH1	January 1, 1985
MTV Entertainment Group
MTV Branded Television	MTV	August 1, 1981
MTV Branded Television	MTV2	August 1, 1996
MTV Branded Television	MTV Classic	August 1, 1998
MTV Branded Television	MTV Tres	August 1, 1998
MTV Branded Television	MTVU	January 20, 2004
MTV Branded Television	MTV Live	January 16, 2006
General Entertainment Content	CMT	March 5, 1983
General Entertainment Content	CMT Music	August 1, 1998
General Entertainment Content	Logo TV	June 30, 2005
General Entertainment Content	Paramount Network	March 7, 1983
General Entertainment Content	Pop TV	1981
General Entertainment Content	Smithsonian Channel	September 26, 2007
General Entertainment Content	TV Land	April 29, 1996
Comedy and Animation Group
Nickelodeon Group	Nickelodeon	April 1, 1979
Nickelodeon Group	Nick at Nite	July 1, 1985
Nickelodeon Group	Nick Jr.	January 4, 1988
Nickelodeon Group	Nick Jr. Channel	September 28, 2009
Nickelodeon Group	TeenNick	September 28, 2009
Nickelodeon Group	NickMusic	May 1, 2002
Nickelodeon Group	Nicktoons	May 1, 2002
The Cartoon Network, Inc.	Cartoon Network	October 1, 1992
The Cartoon Network, Inc.	Toonami	March 17, 1997
The Cartoon Network, Inc.	Boomerang	April 1, 2000
The Cartoon Network, Inc.	Adult Swim	September 2, 2001
Comedy Partners	Comedy Central	April 1, 1991
Turner Media networks
Turner cable networks	TBS	December 17, 1976
Turner cable networks	TNT	October 3, 1988
Turner cable networks	TNT Sports	April 6, 1973
Turner cable networks	TruTV	December 14, 1990
Turner cable networks	CNN	June 1, 1980
Turner cable networks	TLC	October 1980
Turner cable networks	HGTV	December 30, 1994

=== Skydance Television Animation ===
- Nickelodeon Animation Studios
  - Avatar Studios
  - Nickelodeon Digital
- CBS Eye Animation Productions
  - Late Night Cartoons, Inc.
- Warner Bros. Animation
  - Cartoon Network Studios
  - Hanna-Barbera Studios Europe
- Williams Street
- South Park Digital Studios (joint venture with Trey Parker & Matt Stone's Park County)

=== Former channels ===
- Bravo; sold to Rainbow Media in 1984.
- Nick GAS (1999–2007/09 on Dish because of problematic unknown factors)
- VH1 Uno (2000–08); became MTVU, focusing on music videos aimed at college-aged students.
- Noggin (1999–2009); rebranded as Nick Jr. Channel in 2009. Later relaunched as the Noggin App in 2015.
- TEENick (Nickelodeon block, 2001–09) and The N (Noggin block, 2002–07/09 on Dish); merged to form 24/7 TeenNick.
- Showtime Beyond (1999–2020), became SHO×BET in 2020.
- MTVX; became MTV Jams in 2002, focusing on hip-hop music, and rebranded as BET Jams in October 2015.
- VH1 MegaHits; now as Logo TV, but aimed at LGBTQ+ audiences.
- AwesomenessTV; folded into Paramount Television Studios

== Units ==
=== MTV Entertainment Group ===
MTV Entertainment Group
- Type: Division
- Headquarters: Los Angeles, California, U.S.
- Key people: Laurel Weir (president and CEO)
- Brands: MTV; CMT; Comedy Central; Logo TV; Paramount Network; Pop; Smithsonian Channel; TV Land
- Parent: Skydance Global Cable Media
- Divisions: MTV Branded Television; General Entertainment Content
- Website: mtv.com

MTV Entertainment Group serves as the holdings company for Paramount's mature-oriented, general entertainment brands; such as its namesake flagship MTV, Comedy Central, and Paramount Network. It operates two divisions: MTV Branded Television (MTV-related channels) & General Entertainment Content (non-MTV-related channels).

==== MTV Branded Television ====
- MTV
  - MTV2
  - MTV Classic
  - MTV Tres
  - MTVU
  - MTV Live

==== General Entertainment Content ====
- CMT
  - CMT Canada (10% with Corus Entertainment)
  - CMT Music
- Logo TV
- Paramount Network
- Pop
- TV Land
- Smithsonian Channel
  - Canada (6.67% minority stake; joint venture with Blue Ant Media)

=== Showtime Networks ===
Showtime Networks oversees the company's premium networks, which include its flagship service, The Movie Channel, and Flix.

- Showtime
  - Showtime 2
  - Showtime Showcase
  - SHO×BET
  - Showtime Extreme
  - Showtime Family Zone
  - Showtime Next
  - Showtime Women
- The Movie Channel
  - The Movie Channel Xtra
- Flix

=== Nickelodeon Group ===
The Nickelodeon Group (also known as "Nickelodeon Networks Inc."; and as its family distribution name "Paramount Kids and Family Group") is an American entertainment company that oversees Paramount's entertainment assets targeting at youth and family audiences, including its namesake cable network and Nickelodeon Animation Studio.

- Nickelodeon
  - Nick at Nite
  - Nick Jr.
- Nick Jr. Channel
- Nicktoons
- TeenNick
- NickMusic

=== The Cartoon Network, Inc. ===
The Cartoon Network, Inc. operates Cartoon Network, its programming blocks Adult Swim and Toonami in addition to Boomerang.

- Cartoon Network
- Adult Swim
  - Toonami
- Boomerang

=== BET Media Group ===
BET Media Group owns networks aimed at African Americans, including BET and their related sister channels.

- BET
  - BET Her
  - BET Hip-Hop
  - BET Gospel
  - BET Jams
  - BET Soul
- VH1

=== Skydance Television Animation ===
Skydance Television Animation is a consolidated television animation division formed by Skydance following its acquisition of Warner Bros. Discovery.

- Nickelodeon Animation Studios
  - Avatar Studios
  - Nickelodeon Digital
- CBS Eye Animation Productions
  - Late Night Cartoons, Inc.
- Warner Bros. Animation
  - Cartoon Network Studios
  - Hanna-Barbera Studios Europe
- Williams Street
- South Park Digital Studios (joint venture with Trey Parker & Matt Stone's Park County)

== Former assets ==
The company has owned many other internet properties including virtual pets website Neopets; Flash game websites AddictingGames.com and Shockwave.com; online content production company Atom Entertainment; along with RateMyProfessors.com, GameTrailers, and iFilm, all of which have been shut down or sold off during 2000s and 2010s.

During the first quarter of 2008, iFilm was merged into Spike with its website re–branded and re–purposed as Spike.com.

In 2014, Viacom purchased a stake in multi-channel network Defy Media, while offloading GameTrailers, Addicting Games, and Shockwave to Defy.

=== Harmonix and gaming ===
In 2006, Viacom acquired Harmonix, a video game studio oriented towards music video games and the original developer of the Guitar Hero franchise, for $175 million. The two subsequently collaborated on the creation of Rock Band. That year, Viacom also acquired the gaming–oriented communications platform Xfire.

In 2010, Harmonix was divested to an investment firm to become an independent studio, and Xfire was sold.

In 2011, Viacom established a short–lived, in–house development studio known as 345 Games, which was dedicated primarily to developing games based on Comedy Central, MTV and Spike properties.

== Viacom International ==
Viacom International Inc. was established in 1971, just a year after Viacom spun out from the CBS TV network and became Viacom's parent company. The company is responsible for copyrights and trademarks associated with Paramount Media Networks and Paramount International Networks as well as most programming principally produced by Paramount Television Studios and Paramount Television International Studios. The division also licenses the product rights for their various properties and the dissemination of visual and textual television programs on a subscription/fee basis. The company jointly owns Comedy Partners with Viacom Hearty Ha! Ha! LLC, who owned the Ha! network as well as a stake in Comedy Central prior to HBO's departure.

Viacom International also served as the licensee name and division for its group of television stations for FCC purposes before the 1995 Westinghouse/CBS merger. Former Viacom station WVIT in New Britain, Connecticut (serving Hartford and New Haven), which it owned from 1978 until 1997, took its call letters from the initials of Viacom International, and retains them to the present day under NBC ownership.

In 2006, Viacom International was renamed to CBS Operations, Inc. by CBS Corporation, and its copyrights related to Viacom's cable networks were transferred to a subsidiary of the new Viacom also named Viacom International Inc. The new subsidiary remains active as copyright holder of some Paramount TV assets as they existed pre-Skydance merger under the Paramount Skydance with the exception of pre-developed Skydance Television projects (those under Skydance Television credit continued under Skydance Productions, LLC whereas the ones that continued in 2026 and beyond were transferred to Paramount Television Studios, a division of Paramount Pictures Corporation) alongwith all non-Paramount Media Networks projects before the 2023 restructure of TV production operations on the Paramount side (with Showtime re-joining Viacom cable networks as they existed before pre-2019 restructure of corporate parents of each) and continued exception of Comedy Central and CBS Studios in-house projects. Viacom International, Inc. folded into Viacom Media Networks in 2019. ViacomCBS International Inc. was used as an alternate trade name for the company during the 2020–21 television season, when the company was under ViacomCBS.
