= CBS Sports HQ =

American streaming sports news channel

- Country: United States
- Broadcast area: Worldwide
- Network: CBS Sports
- Headquarters: Stamford, Connecticut, and Fort Lauderdale, Florida, United States

Programming
- Language: English
- Picture format: 720p (HD, variable due to user bandwidth)

Ownership
- Owner: Skydance Corporation
- Parent: CBS Sports
- Sister channels: List: Nickelodeon; Nick Jr. Channel; Nicktoons; TeenNick; NickMusic; CBS Sports Network; CBS Sports Golazo Network; CBS News 24/7; MTV; MTV2; MTV Tres; MTV Live; MTV Classic; BET; BET Gospel; BET Her; BET Hip-Hop; BET Jams; BET Soul; VH1; Comedy Central; TV Land; Logo; CMT; CMT Music; Pop TV; Showtime; The Movie Channel; Flix; Paramount Network; Smithsonian Channel

History
- Launched: February 26, 2018

Links
- Webcast: cbssports.com/live

Availability

Streaming media
- Service(s): Paramount+, Pluto TV, Samsung TV Plus, The Roku Channel

CBS Sports HQ is a streaming video sports channel operated the CBS Sports division of Skydance Corporation. Focused on airing sports news, highlights and scores, similar to pre-2010 ESPNews. CBS Sports HQ is co-headquartered in Stamford, Connecticut, and Fort Lauderdale, Florida. Like its sister station CBS News 24/7, it is designed primarily as a digital-oriented service and is available for free on a multitude of platforms, including smartphones, tablets, computers, Apple TV, Amazon Fire TV, and Roku. It can also be accessed through the CBS Sports app for iOS and Android, Pluto TV, Xumo and Paramount+ rather than traditional platforms such as television, broadcast or otherwise. The service is designed with younger audience in mind, allowing a viewer to get continuously updated information from the world of sports in a fast-paced format at any time of the day. It can be watched as a linear channel or as on-demand segments. The network carries eight minutes of advertising per hour and operates live, on average, 10 hours daily.

== History ==
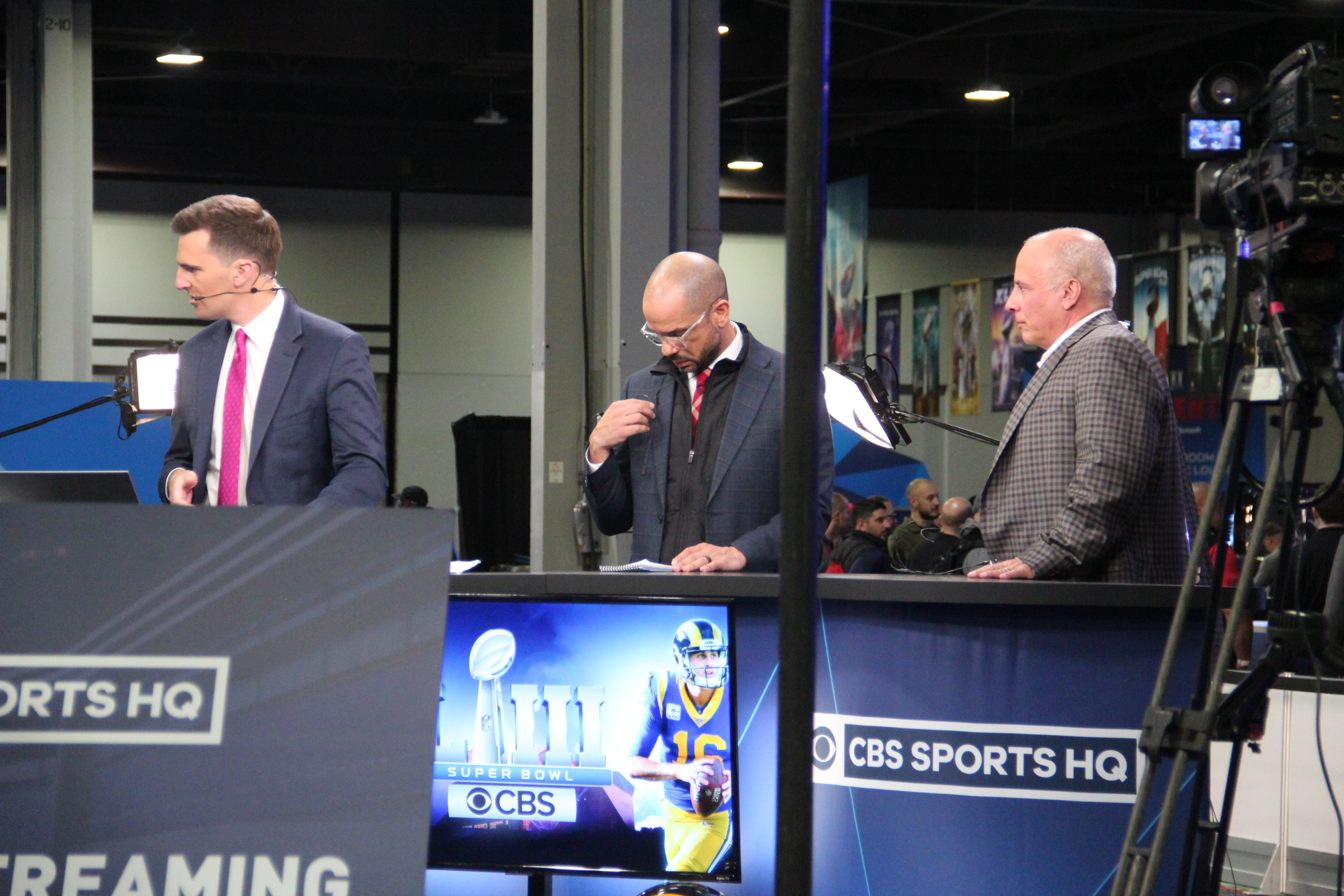
CBS Sports HQ at the Georgia World Congress Center, 2019

Planning for the service began in early 2017. It was described early on as being the "CBSN for sports". CBS Sports HQ was launched on February 26, 2018, after success with CBSN and CBS All Access. Nick Kostos previewed the launch at 5pm and then Chris Hassel and Dalen Cuff kicked the broadcast off at 7pm that night. Speaking to investors after reporting fourth-quarter earnings in 2018, CBS Corp. CEO Leslie Moonves stated the company had garnered a combined five million subscribers to its “CBS All Access” streaming service and an over-the-top version of Showtime and expected to surpass its goal of 8 million subscribers by 2020. Meanwhile, CBSN saw streams rise by 17% in 2017 compared to the year-earlier period.

In late 2018, headquarters operations and a studio dedicated fully to Sports HQ were established in Stamford, Connecticut, with "split daily operations of Sports HQ between Stamford and Fort Lauderdale".

Since January 2023, CBS Sports HQ has produced a three-hour sports information show for CBS Sports Network entitled CBS Sports HQ Spotlight. In March 2023, it announced a spin-off service, the CBS Sports Golazo Network, which will feature a focus on soccer news, highlights, and matches.

== Programming ==
CBS Sports HQ draws content from CBS Sports along with its various digital properties, such as 247Sports, SportsLine, CBS Sports Fantasy and MaxPreps to deliver live news reports, game previews, post-game analysis, highlights and in-depth statistical breakdowns to connected devices, without focusing on "loud arguments or bloated diatribes".

CBS Sports HQ used to display continuous information on an R-shaped ticker placed at the lower and right-sides of the TV screen, which isn't visible during commercial breaks. The lower third ticker contains scores, brief news alerts, the day's sports headlines and fixtures in an ESPN BottomLine-styled format. The right-side ticker predominantly features statistics, tables, and fixtures.

On November 10, 2020, the R-bar was dropped, leaving only the lower third that was "made taller by over 33,5%" in order to simplify the presentation. It displays all of its own content and those adopted from the R-bar, as well as those related directly to what's being discussed on air.

CBS Sports HQ covers an extremely wide range of sports leagues, including those that CBS doesn't have rights to broadcast. Its programming includes recurring segments such as Morning Trends (top sports stories in social media), At This Hour (five key headlines of the hour), News in 90 (four or five key stories of the day), Around Our Nation (college football games of the week previews), and HQ Refresh (top stories and scores of the day).

In contrast to CBSN, which carries some over-the-air CBS News programming on a time delay, CBS Sports HQ does not carry any longform content from CBS television or CBS Sports Network. Live sporting events are also absent from the network's programming.

== Anchors ==
- Tommy Tran - Anchor
- Chris Hassel - Anchor
- Brandon Baylor - Anchor
- Amanda Guerra - Anchor
- Hakeem Dermish - Anchor
- Joe Musso - Anchor
- Poppy Miller - Host, UEFA Champions League and UEFA Europa League
- Ian Joy - Host, UEFA Champions League and UEFA Europa League

Many of CBS Sports Digital's writers and analysts will also contribute, including; senior NFL columnist Pete Prisco; NBA Analyst Avery Johnson and college basketball columnist Gary Parrish.
