= Louis Carr (entrepreneur) =

American media executive

- Born: May 3, 1956 (age 70); Chicago, Illinois
- Occupations: President, BET Media Group
- Spouse: Diane
- Website: louiscarrfoundation.org

Louis Carr (born May 3, 1956) is an American media executive and author. He was president of BET Media Sales for twenty five years before Carr was appointed president of BET Media Group in December 2025. In November 2026, Skydance announced Carr was stepping down from his role. Carr is the founder of Waymaker Media and the Louis Carr Internship Foundation, established in 2003.

Carr cites BET co-founder Robert L. Johnson and Black Enterprise's founder Earl Graves Sr. as mentors.

== Early life and education ==
Carr was raised in Garfield Park, Illinois. His father, Lewis Carr, was a boxing trainer. Carr graduated from Lane Technical High School in 1974. Carr attended Drake University with a track scholarship, and graduated from Drake University's School of Journalism and Mass Communication in 1978.

== Career ==
Carr began his career at Ebony magazine, part of the Johnson Publishing Company. He moved onto Black Enterprise before Bob Johnson recruited him to BET in 1986.

By the mid-2000s, Carr served as the Executive Vice President EVP of BET's Broadcast Media Sales as well as President of Media Sales.

In December 2025, Louis Carr became President of BET Media Group. In November 2026, he announced that he would step down from the role by the end of the year.

=== Author ===
Carr has written two books, Dirty Little Secrets (DLS) and Little Black Book: Daily Motivations for Business and Personal Growth.

=== Foundations and initiatives ===
Carr has served on the Video Advertising Board (VAB), the USA Track and Field Foundation, Drake University, Cedar Fair, and the American Advertising Federation.

In 2017, Carr launched the1st Annual Dirty Little Secrets: Men Only Edition Conference, with a focus on empowering Black men. He rebranded it to The Blueprint Men's Summit in 2019, and then again to Waymaker Men's Summit.

=== Recognition ===
Carr has been listed on NAMIC's Most Influential African Americans in the Cable Industry. Carr was named the 2026 Ray Harris Lifetime Achievement Honoree of the Living Legends Foundation.

In 2023, Carr was recipient of the Silver Medal the Chicago Advertising Federation. That same year, Carr was Inducted to The 72nd Class of the Advertising Hall of Fame.

== Personal ==
Carr lives in Chicago with his wife, Diane.
