= Jenny Chiu =

American soccer player and reporter (born 1995)

Personal information
- Full name: Jenny Ana Chiu Amparán
- Date of birth: September 25, 1995 (age 31)
- Place of birth: El Paso, Texas, U.S.
- Height: 5 ft 5 in (1.65 m)
- Positions: Forward; midfielder

College career
Years	Team	Apps	(Gls)
2013–2016	North Carolina	15	(0)

International career
2012	Mexico U-17	5	(0)
2014	Mexico U-20	0	(0)

Jenny Ana Chiu Amparán (born September 25, 1995) is an American sports reporter and former soccer player. She has worked for CBS Sports since 2020. Born in the United States, she played internationally for the Mexico national under-17 team. She played college soccer for the North Carolina Tar Heels.

== Early life and playing career ==
Chiu was born in El Paso, Texas, to Lorena and C.Y. Chiu. She is of Mexican and Chinese descent. She has two brothers, one of whom, Andy, played college soccer for Akron.

After she showed promise in soccer at age eight, Chiu's father hired Salvador Mercado and Guillermo McFarlane to be her private coaches. She played on boys' teams and attracted national attention from scouts by age twelve. She was called up to train with the youth national teams of Mexico and the United States. She played one season of high school soccer as a sophomore at Franklin High School in El Paso. In April 2011, the website TopDrawerSoccer.com named her the top player from Texas. She verbally committed to the University of North Carolina at Chapel Hill in July 2011.

During her sophomore year in high school, pain emerged in a spot on Chiu's lower back which was diagnosed as the result of bulging spinal disks partly due to overuse while playing on poor fields. Despite the pain, she played for the Mexico under-17 team at the 2012 CONCACAF Women's U-17 Championship and captained the team at the 2012 FIFA U-17 Women's World Cup, where she played in two games. Back in El Paso, the pain worsened to the point that she sat out her senior high school and club season. She graduated from the School for Educational Enrichment in El Paso in 2013.

Chiu played in only 15 games for 164 minutes during her four years at North Carolina. She redshirted her first year and played in only six games the next two seasons. In the summer of 2014, she was called up to the Mexico under-20 team at the 2014 FIFA U-20 Women's World Cup. In a study abroad program before her last year of college, she covered soccer and badminton at the 2016 Summer Olympics in an internship with the Olympic News Service. She played in nine games as a redshirt junior, ending her college career in the semifinals of the 2016 NCAA Championship. She graduated from the UNC Hussman School of Journalism and Media in 2017.

== Journalism career ==
While playing professional soccer in Australia, Chiu got her start in professional broadcasting with Fox Sports. She then became a social media intern for the Portland Timbers of Major League Soccer (MLS) and conducted player interviews and produced content for a vlog. She joined the broadcast team of MLS's Orlando City SC in 2018, and she won a Suncoast Emmy Award for producing a short video about Orlando's 2020 preseason.

CBS Sports hired Chiu in September 2020 to be an on-field reporter for the UEFA Champions League. She began reporting for Morning Footy and appearing on Attacking Third for the CBS Sports Golazo Network in 2023.
