= BET Media Group =

Parent company of the BET cable television channel

Black Entertainment Television LLC
- Trade name: BET Media Group
- Formerly: BET Holdings Inc. (1983–2001); BET Networks (2001–2022)
- Type: Subsidiary
- Traded as: NYSE: BET (1991–2001)
- Industry: Entertainment
- Founded: 1983; 43 years ago
- Founder: Robert L. Johnson
- Headquarters: Washington, D.C., U.S.
- Key people: Louis Carr
- Products: Pay television, television production
- Brands: BET; BET Her; BET Gospel; BET Jams; BET Soul; VH1
- Number of employees: 11,949
- Parent: Skydance Global Cable Media
- Website: www.paramount.com/about/brands/bet

Black Entertainment Television LLC, doing business as the BET Media Group (formerly BET Networks) is an American television company owned by the Skydance Global Cable Media division of Skydance TV, itself a division of Skydance, following its acquisition by Viacom, one of Skydance's predecessors in 2001. Founded by Robert L. Johnson in 1983, the company owns networks and channels aimed at African Americans, including its flagship channel.

As of December 2025, Louis Carr has led the BET Media Group as its President.

== History ==
=== Background ===
In 1980, Robert L. Johnson, who left his position as a cable lobbyist; established his own cable network called Black Entertainment Television. It was originally a programming block on the original Madison Square Garden Sports Network (now USA Network), until it became a separate channel in 1983.

In 1991, the network became the first black–controlled TV company to be listed on the New York Stock Exchange.

Starting in the late 1990s, the network expanded with the launch of digital cable networks: BET on Jazz (later known as BET Jazz, BET J, Centric, and BET Her), created originally to showcase jazz music–related programming, especially that of black jazz musicians; in 1998, it entered into a joint venture with Starz (then–owned by John Malone's Liberty Media) to launch a multiplex service of the premium channel featuring African American–oriented movies called BET Movies: Starz! 3 (later renamed Black Starz after BET dropped out of the venture following its purchase by Viacom, then–owner of Starz rival Showtime, and now known as Starz InBlack).

=== 2000s & 2010s ===
Logo from 2005 to 2021.

In 2000, Viacom announced plans to purchase BET Holdings Inc. for more than $2.3 billion. The deal closed in 2001, with BET Holdings' networks becoming part of MTV Networks; but was eventually placed under BET Networks.

In 2005, Robert Johnson retired as CEO, and was replaced with Debra L. Lee. Around the same time, Viacom was looking into splitting into two entities following multiple issues surrounding the company. On December 31, 2005, a new incarnation of Viacom was created as the new parent of MTV Networks, BET Networks, Paramount Pictures, and Famous Music (later sold to Sony Music in 2007). The "new" Viacom would be spun-off from what became CBS Corporation, the legal successor to the original Viacom; which would retain CBS, Paramount Television, UPN, CBS Radio, and Paramount Parks (later sold to Cedar Fair in 2007).

By 2007, BET had launched two more music–oriented networks, BET Hip Hop and BET Gospel. The flagship network would also launch new original programming by this time, including reality shows Baldwin Hills and Hell Date, competition show Sunday Best, and town hall–style discussion show Hip Hop vs. America. BET's president of entertainment Reginald Hudlin resigned from the network on September 11, 2008. He was then replaced by Stephen Hill, who is also executive vice president of music programming and talent. BET announced in March 2010 that Ed Gordon would return to the network to host "a variety of news programs and specials".

In 2015, oversight of VH1 Soul & MTV Jams was moved to BET Networks, with both networks relaunched under the BET brand.

In March 2017, president of programming Stephen Hill and executive vice president of original programming Zola Mashariki both stepped down. Connie Orlando, senior vice president of Specials, Music Programming, and News, was named the interim president of programming.

In July 2017, Viacom signed new film and television development deals with Tyler Perry following the expiration of his existing pact with Discovery, Inc. in 2019. As part of this deal, Perry would produce The Oval and Sistas for BET and co–own the network's newly launched streaming service, BET+.

=== Skydance-Paramount merger and abandoned sale ===
After Viacom re-merged with CBS to form what is now Paramount Global, BET was transferred from the Paramount Media Networks division to CBS Entertainment Group under the oversight of the latter's president, George Cheeks. By then, the subsidiary overseeing BET-branded assets became known as the BET Media Group. On November 9, 2022, it was announced that oversight of VH1 would move to BET under Scott Mills. The move reunited the network with the formally-named VH1 Soul, while also splitting it from MTV and its other formerly-branded sibling channels (VH1 Classic and VH1 Country).

In March 2023, it was reported that Paramount Global was exploring the sale of a majority stake in BET Media in order to provide additional funding to its flagship streaming service Paramount+. Shaquille O'Neal, Tyler Perry, as well as Sean "Puffy" Combs (who founded Revolt TV) and Byron Allen (who owns Allen Media Group; including TheGrio, This TV, and The Weather Channel), were identified as potential suitors. Paramount Global initially dropped its plans to sell BET Media in August 2023, before renewing interest in December of that year.

Since April 2, 2024, Paramount and its parent company, National Amusements, were in discussions with Skydance Media for a three-way merger between the entities. By July 2, 2024, Skydance reached a preliminary agreement to acquire National Amusements and merge with Paramount. Meanwhile, Paramount reportedly entered talks for a sale of BET Media to buyers led by CEO Scott Mills for $1.6-$1.7 billion. On July 7, 2024, Paramount's board approved the deal to merge with Skydance. Skydance's executive team also supported the potential sale of several Paramount assets which were deemed "not strategic" to their plans, including BET Media.

On August 13, 2025, it was confirmed that BET Media Group is no longer up for sale.

=== BET under Paramount Skydance ===
Louis Carr became President of BET Media Group in the wake of the merger, with former BMG President Scott Mills leaving in December of 2025. In March of 2026, Paramount Skydance announced it would be migrating BET+ assets to Paramount Plus, effectively shutting down the BET+ streaming service in June of the same year.

== Assets and other ventures ==
=== Television ===
Year in parentheses denotes when channel was created.

- BET (1980)
  - BET Her (1996) (Note: Channel was originally known as BET on Jazz, BET Jazz, BET J, & Centric.)
  - BET Gospel (2002)
  - BET Hip-Hop (2002)
  - BET Jams (2002) (Note: Channel originally had the MTV branding, and was part of the Viacom Media Networks group (now known as Paramount Media Networks).) - formerly MTV Jams
  - BET Soul (1998) - formerly VH1 Soul
- BET+ (2017) (Note: Folded into Paramount+ in 2026.) - operated by Tyler Perry Studios
- VH1 (1985) (Note: Channel originally owned by Warner-Amex Satellite Entertainment; a division of Warner Communications, and the original owner of then-sister channel MTV. It was spun-off into MTV Networks (now known as Paramount Media Networks) on June 25, 1984, and eventually acquired by the original incarnation of Viacom between 1985 & 1986. In the years' following the spinning-off, and eventual reunion, of assets between 2005 and 2019 that lead to the formation of the present-day Paramount Global, oversight of the channel would be moved to BET three years later.)

=== BET Films ===
==== Released films ====
Title	Release date	Co-production	Distributor	Notes
Nobody's Fool	November 2, 2018	Paramount Players; Tyler Perry Studios	Paramount Pictures	First film from Paramount Players
What Men Want	February 8, 2019	Paramount Players; Will Packer Productions	Paramount Pictures	
Body Cam	May 19, 2020	Paramount Players; Ace Entertainment	Paramount Pictures	
Karen	September 3, 2021	Flixville USA	Quiver Distribution	
King of the South	TBA	Lionsgate Films; Genius Minds Pictures	Genius Minds Pictures	

=== BET Digital ===
In 2006, BET Interactive, LLC became a subsidiary of BET Networks. Former and defunct digital assets include BET on Blast and BET Mobile.

=== Former ===
==== BET Walk of Fame Awards ====
The BET Walk of Fame Awards were established in 1995 by BET. In 2004, proceeds were shared between United Negro College Fund (UNCF) and the BET Foundation, which executes the Healthy BET obesity awareness campaign and other pro-social causes like the annual charitable black-tie BET Walk of Fame ceremony.

==== BET Home Entertainment ====
BET's programming is distributed on DVD and through video-on-demand services under the name BET Home Entertainment. In 2007, a distribution deal was arranged with Paramount Home Entertainment, a sister company of BET since 2001.
