= The Salt-N-Pepa Show =

American reality television show

- Title card
- Starring: Sandra Denton; Cheryl James
- Country of origin: United States
- Original language: English
- No. of seasons: 2
- No. of episodes: 14

Production
- Executive producers: Banks Tarver; Ken Druckerman; Michael Hirschorn; Shelly Tatro; Danielle Gelfand
- Production companies: Left/Right Productions; VH1

Original release
- Network: VH1
- Release: October 14, 2007 – March 24, 2008

The Salt-N-Pepa Show, which premiered on October 14, 2007, on VH1, is a reality show documenting the events from the life of Salt-n-Pepa, several years after their breakup.

== Episodes ==
=== Series overview ===
| Season | Episodes | Originally released | |
| Season | Episodes | First released | Last released |
|---|---|---|---|
| 1 | 7 | October 14, 2007 | December 3, 2007 |
| 2 | 7 | February 11, 2008 | March 24, 2008 |

=== Season 1 (2007) ===
Two themes emerged from the first episode: Pepa's lingering bitterness from how Salt abruptly departed the group years ago, which Salt attempted to soothe with an apology; and a cultural conflict between the ladies, as Salt's strong Christian commitment leads her to renounce the duo's raunchy lyrics and dance moves from their former performing days, whereas Pepa wants to continue performing, like the "old" days. The remainder of the episodes show the duo as they explore the idea of reuniting.

| No. overall | No. in season | Title | Original release date |
|---|---|---|---|
| 1 | 1 | "Pushin' It" | October 14, 2007 |
Salt and Pepa agree to meet to talk about possibly performing songs at Shaquille O'Neal's birthday party. Salt reluctantly agrees to consider reuniting. Salt objects to performing lyrics and dances that compromises her beliefs. The duo perform at Salt's church. Salt apologizes to Pepa for her abrupt departure from the group.
| 2 | 2 | "Whatta Manhunt" | October 21, 2007 |
Salt and a matchmaker attempt to find Pepa the perfect man. Pepa also finds her own date, who turns out to have many shortcomings. After an unsuccessful search, Salt tries to match Pepa with Mark, a youth pastor at her church.
| 3 | 3 | "Houseguests From Hell" | October 28, 2007 |
While Pepa's apartment is being renovated, she stays at Salt's house. Pepa arrives with many pieces of luggage and spends the night partying – and loudly – with Salt's husband. She also crashes Salt's prayer meeting. Mayhem ensues.
| 4 | 4 | "Spinderella, Cut It Up One Time" | November 5, 2007 |
Salt and Pepa reunite with their DJ, "Spinderella" (Deidra "DeeDee" Roper). The three of them get ready to appear on the Tyra Banks Show. Beforehand, Spin' vents some frustrations to Salt and Pepa, feeling that they treated her more like a hired gun than as a full-fledged co-member of the group. Salt and Pepa don't appear to deny the claim, but they respond that by bringing Spin' along to publicity events and the like, they felt they were helping her develop in her career.
| 5 | 5 | "Pep's In Charge" | November 12, 2007 |
Salt and Pepa produce a Public Service Announcement (PSA) for Lifebeat, a music industry group that works on AIDS prevention. The Lifebeat representative asks the ladies if they would do a brief performance at a gathering to celebrate the release of the PSA. Salt is reluctant to do so because of her time commitments, but when Pepa insists that she can take care of all the preparations, Salt then agrees to perform. Pepa's choices are too sexually oriented for Salt. The act is toned down for the Lifebeat performance.
| 6 | 6 | "Jena 6" | November 26, 2007 |
The ladies travel to Louisiana for the Jena Six protests. On the tour bus, the ladies educate their children about the meaning behind the march.
| 7 | 7 | "Hair It Is" | December 3, 2007 |
The ladies consider endorsing hair weave products.

=== Season 2 (2008) ===
| No. overall | No. in season | Title | Original release date |
|---|---|---|---|
| 8 | 1 | "Let's Get This Party Started" | February 11, 2008 |
Salt invites Pepa to help her plan a "boys" party for her 16-year-old daughter. They disagree on everything: guest count, theme, content, and so on, to the point where Pepa finds herself disliking the shopping trip. When Pepa sneaks behind Salt's back for a makeover, Salt is none too pleased. The party, with only a few dozen guests, turns out to be a hit.
| 9 | 2 | "Three's a Crowd" | February 18, 2008 |
Spinderella invites Salt and Pepa to join her at a DJ gig in Atlantic City, but is shocked and hurt when the first ladies of Hip Hop say they have other plans. Salt and Pep reluctantly give in and hit the road to Atlantic City. What is supposed to be a bonding weekend for all three girls quickly becomes a game of odd man out. The ladies realize that a duo works, but three's a crowd!
| 10 | 3 | "The Retreat" | February 25, 2008 |
Salt and Pepa need to work on their relationship and communication skills, so they seek the help of professional life coach, Iyanla Vanzant. The ladies struggle with their past relationship problems as Iyanla tests their alliances, trust, and love for each other. The camp they went to was Pocono Plateau in Cresco, Pa.
| 11 | 4 | "Write and Wrong" | March 3, 2008 |
Salt and Pepa visit the college they first met in and answer some questions from students. They also decide to write and record a new song.
| 12 | 5 | "Weight a Minute" | March 10, 2008 |
Salt and Pepa enroll in weight-loss boot camp to prepare for New York's fashion week. Then when Pepa decides to quit to get liposuction, Salt tries to talk her out of it.
| 13 | 6 | "Boys on the Slopes" | March 17, 2008 |
Salt and Pepa try to come up with ideas, while writing a new song.
| 14 | 7 | "The (Not So) Big Easy" | March 24, 2008 |
Pepa tricks Salt into going to New Orleans, by saying they'll help with the rebuilding effort, when Pepa really wants to go to Mardi Gras.
