= MTV Live (TV channel) =

American television channel

- Country: United States
- Broadcast area: Nationwide
- Headquarters: New York City, New York

Programming
- Language: English
- Picture format: 1080i HDTV

Ownership
- Owner: MTV Entertainment Group (Skydance Corporation)
- Sister channels: MTV; MTV2; MTV Classic; MTVU; Tr3s; VH1; CMT; CMT Music; Logo TV; Nickelodeon; Paramount Network

History
- Launched: January 16, 2006; 20 years ago
- Former names: Music: High Definition (2006–2008); Palladia (2008–2016)

Availability

Streaming media
- Affiliated Streaming Service: Paramount+
- Philo: Internet Protocol television

MTV Live (formerly Music: High Definition and Palladia) is an American pay television channel owned by the MTV Entertainment Group division of Skydance Corporation. Broadcasting exclusively in 1080i high definition and 5.1 surround sound, the channel broadcasts music videos and music-related programming from Paramount-owned channels MTV, MTV Classic, VH1 and CMT, along with other concert and live music programming from outside producers.

== History ==
In December 2005, director and producer F. Stone Roberts, editor and post supervisor Agent Ogden, cinematographer Colin Oberschmidt, production assistant Sonia Taylor and VJ George Oliphant began filming content in Vail, Colorado to launch the channel. The team produced live concerts and a one-hour weekly music show, called Uncompressed, from a lookalike ski lodge built inside the Eagle's Nest at the top of Vail Mountain. The channel's original executive producer was Morgan Hertzan, who had worked with MTVU. Olympic bump skier George Oliphant and pro football player Jeremy Bloom were VJs during the original run in Vail. Original concerts produced at Vail Resorts included James Blunt, Jamie Cullum, Yellowcard, Train, P.O.D, Hoobastank, Goo Goo Dolls, Gary Allan, The Fray, Death Cab For Cutie, and Mat Kearney.

The channel officially launched on January 16, 2006, as Music: High Definition (MHD). At its launch, the channel had limited distribution with Verizon FiOS being the only provider to carry MHD. Two months later, Cox Communications reached an agreement to carry the channel, which was subsequently added to Cox systems in New Orleans, Tulsa, Oklahoma City, and Phoenix. Around the same time, Comcast started carrying the channel on its systems in Boston and Atlanta.

Logo as Palladia (2008–2016)

Charter Communications began carrying the channel on its St. Louis system on July 18, 2006, adding the channel to its systems in the northern Midwest in early November of that year. Time Warner Cable began carrying the channel in some regions in late December 2006. In 2007, Service Electric Cable Television began to carry the channel on its systems in northeastern and central Pennsylvania. On October 4, 2007, DirecTV began carrying the network nationwide. The channel was rebranded as Palladia on September 1, 2008. Initially, Mitsubishi Electric Digital Televisions was the exclusive sponsor.

In January 2016, Viacom Media Networks announced that Palladia would be renamed to MTV Live on February 1, 2016, making it one of several VMN all-music channels rebrands in 2016 (including NickMusic and MTV Classic). No other changes were made except for the addition of "best of" episodes of the PBS/KLRU music series Austin City Limits. Despite the rebranding, the network had no change in focus towards any reality programming (to which MTV and VH1 had shifted) and continued to focus on music programming. MTV Live and MTVU have since been used for video premieres and spotlight of new videos.

== Programming ==
Specials formerly broadcast on MTV Live included the HD simulcasts of the MTV Europe Music Awards, MTV Video Music Awards, CMT Music Awards and VH1 Hip Hop Honors. As carriage of the MTV, CMT and VH1 HD simulcast networks expanded, these programs became exclusive to their parent channel's HD broadcast streams.

The majority of the network's content consists of music video programming, which airs in the overnight, early morning, and daytime hours each day. Additionally, MTV Live airs a music video block on weeknights from 6 p.m. to 8 p.m. ET. On May 11, 2019, MTV Live expanded music video programming across each whole weekend.

In addition to the programs listed below, MTV Live frequently broadcasts concert footage and music documentaries.

=== List of programs broadcast by MTV Live ===
==== Current programming ====
- Epic.Awesome.Videos (Music video programming)
- Metal Thrashing Madness (Music video programming)
- MTV Unplugged
- MTV World Stage (MTV Europe)
- Push Showcase (October 31, 2017 – present)
- Rock Icons
- The Ride (MTV Europe)
- VH1 Storytellers (VH1)

==== Former programming ====
- Best of Austin City Limits (PBS/KLRU)
- Classic Albums
- CMT Crossroads (CMT)
- Front and Center
- Life & Rhymes (BET Jams)
- Live from Daryl's House (September 6, 2012 – June 23, 2016)
- Later... with Jools Holland
- Live from the Artists Den
- MTV Jams (Hip hop and urban contemporary music video block)
- MTV Live Setlist (October 21, 2016 – June 17, 2017)
- nugs.net Live Stash (October 2, 2016 – November 20, 2016)
- Soulstage (BET Soul)
- Soundstage (PBS)
- That Metal Show (originally a VH1 Classic program, reruns of the show aired on the network)
- The Live Room
- TRL (May 21, 2018 – 2019)
- TRL Recap (October 31, 2017 – March 23, 2018)
