= BET Soul =

American pay television network

- Country: United States
- Broadcast area: Nationwide
- Headquarters: New York City, New York

Programming
- Language: English
- Picture format: 480i (SDTV)

Ownership
- Owner: Skydance Corporation
- Parent: BET Media Group (CBS Entertainment Group)
- Sister channels: List: Nickelodeon; Nick; Nick Jr. Channel; Nicktoons; TeenNick; NickMusic; CBS; CBS Sports Network; CBS Sports HQ; CBS Sports Golazo Network; MTV; MTV2; MTV Hits; MTV Tres; MTV Live; MTV Classic; MTV Jams; BET; BET Gospel; BET Her; BET Hip-Hop; BET Jams; VH1; VH1 Classic; VH1 Soul; Comedy Central; TV Land; Logo; CMT; CMT Music; Pop TV; Showtime; The Movie Channel; Flix; Paramount Network; Smithsonian Channel

History
- Launched: August 1, 1998; 28 years ago
- Replaced by: VH1 Soul
- Former names: VH1 Soul (1998-2015)

Links
- Website: BET Soul

Availability

Streaming media
- Service(s): FuboTV

BET Soul (formerly VH1 Soul) is an American pay television network that first launched on August 1, 1998, and is currently owned by Skydance Corporation's BET Media Group. The channel showcases Caribbean, African, R&B, funk, soul, neo soul, hip hop, jazz and Motown music in various decades from the 1970s to the 2020s.

Soul was originally a commercial-free service, along with sister channel VH1 Smooth, and part of the "MTV Digital Suite" of digital cable channels (which was sold only to cable providers to give them an advantage over satellite services). The first video shown on the channel was "Boogie Wonderland" by Earth, Wind & Fire.

VH1 Soul logo from 2006-2015

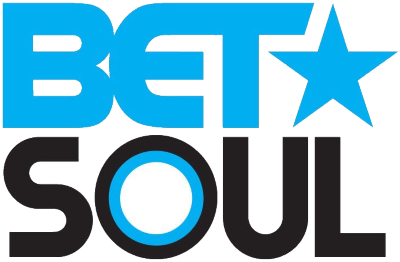
BET Soul logo from 2015-2021

On December 28, 2015 (after MTV Jams' rebrand as BET Jams), VH1 Soul transferred to BET Networks and subsequently rebranded as BET Soul, becoming a sister channel to BET (the network itself removed music videos after the end of 106 & Park the prior year). The move was part of a series of programming and management shifts within then-parent company Viacom. In 2019, the legacy assets of Viacom and CBS Corporation reunited in a merger between the two companies that formed ViacomCBS (later rebranded as Paramount Global, and now Paramount Skydance Corporation, following the acquisition of Paramount by Skydance Media).

On November 9, 2022, oversight of VH1 would transfer to BET Media Group. The move reunited two networks, while also splitting them from MTV and its other formerly-branded sibling channels (VH1 Classic and VH1 Country).
