= BET =

American basic cable channel owned by Paramount

Black Entertainment Television
- Logo since June 27, 2021
- Country: United States
- Broadcast area: United States
- Headquarters: New York City

Programming
- Picture format: 1080i HDTV (downscaled to letterboxed 480i for the SDTV feed)

Ownership
- Owner: Skydance Global Cable Media (Skydance Corporation)
- Parent: BET Media Group
- Sister channels: List: Nickelodeon; CBS; CBS Sports Network; CBS Sports HQ; CBS Sports Golazo Network; MTV; BET Her; VH1; Comedy Central; TV Land; CMT; Pop TV; Showtime; The Movie Channel; Flix; Paramount Network; Smithsonian Channel

History
- Launched: January 25, 1980; 46 years ago (USA Network timeshare); September 1982; 44 years ago (channel)
- Founder: Robert L. Johnson; Sheila Johnson
- Replaced by: Paramount+ (Canadian feed)

Links
- Website: www.bet.com

Availability

Streaming media
- Affiliated streaming service(s): Paramount+
- Service(s): Hulu + Live TV, FuboTV, Philo, Sling TV, YouTube TV

Black Entertainment Television (BET) is an American basic cable network targeting Black American audiences. It is the flagship channel of the BET Media Group, a subsidiary of Skydance Global Cable Media, itself a division of Skydance. Launched as a USA Network programming block on January 25, 1980, BET evolved into a full-fledged cable channel in September 1982.

As of November 2023, BET is available to approximately 67,000,000 pay-TV households in the United States, down from its 2011 peak of 92,000,000 households.

== History ==
=== Early years ===
After stepping down as a lobbyist for the cable industry, Freeport, Illinois native Robert L. Johnson decided to launch his own cable television network. Johnson acquired a loan for $15,000 (equivalent to $55,648 in 2023) and a $500,000 (equivalent to $1,854,921 in 2023) investment from media executive John Malone to start the network. The network, which was named Black Entertainment Television (BET), launched on January 25, 1980. Cheryl D. Miller designed the logo that would represent the network, which featured a star to symbolize "Black Star Power".

Originally broadcasting for two hours a week as a block of programming on the Madison Square Garden Sports Network (which would change their name to USA Network three months after BET launched), the network's lineup was composed of music videos (currently never aired on the main network due to the end of 106 & Park on December 19, 2014) and reruns of popular black sitcoms (such as The Jamie Foxx Show, House of Payne, and others).

=== Becoming a full-time channel ===
In September 1982, BET became a full-fledged entity, independent of any other channel or programming block, though continuing to share channel space with other cable networks on local cable systems due to lack of channel room for their 24-hour schedule until the time of digital cable allowed for larger channel capacity. In some markets, the network would not arrive at all until as late as the early 2010s and Viacom considered it compulsory in retransmission consent negotiations to carry the BET-branded networks with Viacom Media Networks, due to some providers claiming that there was an overall lack of demand for the channel, or excused their lack of interest in BET due to a rumored low to non-existent Black American population within their service area.

BET launched a news program, BET News, in 1986, with Paul Berry as its first anchor. Berry was also a local anchor at WJLA-TV in Washington, DC at that time. Ed Gordon became anchor in 1988. Gordon later hosted other programs and specials on BET, such as For Black Men Only: The Aftermath, related to the 1992 Los Angeles riots, and a recurring interview show, Conversations with Ed Gordon. In 1996, the talk show BET Tonight began with Tavis Smiley as host; in 2001, Ed Gordon replaced Smiley as host of the program.

In 1991, the network became the first black-controlled television company to be listed on the New York Stock Exchange. Starting the late 1990s, the network expanded with the launch of digital cable networks: what is now the general interest channel BET Her was originally launched as "BET on Jazz" (later known as "BET Jazz", "BET J", and "Centric"), created initially to showcase jazz music-related programming, especially that of Black American jazz musicians. In 1997, BET entered into a joint venture with Starz (then-owned by John Malone's Liberty Media, but later acquired by Lionsgate [now Starz Ent] years later) to launch a multiplex service of the premium channel featuring Black American-oriented films called "BET Movies: Starz! 3" (later renamed "Black Starz" after BET dropped out of the venture following its purchase by Viacom, then-owner of Starz rival Showtime, and now known as "Starz InBlack").

=== Sale to Viacom/Paramount ===
The network's logo from 2005 to 2021; shown here is the 2010 revision. Earlier on, the star was outlined.

In 2000, media conglomerate Viacom (later to become part of Paramount Skydance) purchased BET for $2.3 billion. In 2005, Johnson retired from the network, turning over his titles of president and chief executive officer to former BET vice president Debra L. Lee.

In Summer 2002, the network had launched two more music-oriented networks: BET Hip-Hop and BET Gospel. BET also launched a series of original programming by this time, including reality shows Baldwin Hills and Hell Date, singing competition show Sunday Best, and town hall-style discussion show Hip Hop vs. America. BET's president of entertainment Reginald Hudlin resigned from the network on September 11, 2008. He was then replaced by Stephen Hill, who is also executive vice president of music programming and talent. BET announced in March 2010 that Ed Gordon would return to the network to host "a variety of news programs and specials".

On September 25, 2012, BET mailed promotional packages for the upcoming series Don't Sleep, hosted by T. J. Holmes, to several CBS-owned radio stations in Los Angeles. The packages contained beeping alarm clocks which were mistaken for explosive devices, leading to the suspension of local broadcasting and the evacuation of their 27-story office along with surrounding buildings on Wilshire Boulevard.

In March 2017, president of programming Stephen Hill and executive vice president of original programming Zola Mashariki both stepped down. Connie Orlando, senior vice president of Specials, Music Programming, and News was named the interim president of programming.

In July 2017, Viacom signed new film and television development deals with Academy Award winner Tyler Perry following the expiration of his existing pact with Discovery Inc. in 2019. As part of this deal, Perry would produce The Oval and Sistas for BET and co-own the network's newly launched streaming service, BET+. In September 2026, BET removed all articles from its website.

== Criticism ==
A wide range of people have protested elements of BET's programming and actions, including Public Enemy rapper Chuck D, journalist George Curry, writer Keith Boykin, comic book creator Christopher Priest, filmmaker Spike Lee, Syracuse University professor of finance Dr. Boyce Watkins, former NFL player Burgess Owens, and cartoonist Aaron McGruder (who, in addition to numerous critical references throughout his animated series The Boondocks, made two particular episodes, "The Hunger Strike" and "The Uncle Ruckus Reality Show", criticizing the channel). As a result, BET heavily censors suggestive content from the videos that it airs, often with entire verses and scenes removed from certain hip-hop videos.

Many scholars within the Black American community maintain that BET perpetuates and justifies racism by affecting the stereotypes held about Black Americans, and also by affecting the psyche of its young viewers through its bombardment of negative images of Black Americans.

Following the death of civil rights leader Coretta Scott King in 2006, BET aired its regularly scheduled music video programming, rather than covering King's funeral live, as was done by TV One and now-defunct Black Family Channel, and by cable news channels such as CNN, Fox News Channel, and MSNBC. The network's website streamed the funeral live, while it periodically broadcast taped, 60-second reports from the funeral by senior news correspondent Andre Showell. Michael Lewellen, BET's senior vice president for corporate communications, defended the decision: "We weighed a number of different options. In the end, we chose to offer a different kind of experience for BET viewers." Lewellen also stated that BET received around "two dozen" phone calls and "a handful" of emails criticizing BET for not showing the King funeral live. On the evening of the funeral, February 7, 2006, BET broadcast the tribute special Coretta Scott King: Married to the Mission, and repeated it the following Sunday, February 12. Showell hosted the program featuring highlights of the funeral, Coretta Scott King: Celebrating Her Spirit, that broadcast that same day. In its 2007 convention, the National Association of Black Journalists gave BET its "Thumbs Down Award" for not broadcasting King's funeral live.

The New York Times reported that the Reverend Delman L. Coates and his organization Enough is Enough led protests every weekend outside the residences of BET executives against what they claim are negative stereotypes of black people perpetuated by BET music videos. Enough is Enough backed an April 2008 report titled The Rap on Rap by the Parents Television Council that criticized BET's rap programming, suggesting that the gratuitous erotic, violent and profane content was targeting children and teenagers.

In a 2010 interview, BET co-founder Sheila Johnson stated that she herself is "ashamed" of what the network has become. "I don't watch it. I suggest to my kids that they don't watch it," she said. "When we started BET, it was going to be the Ebony magazine on television. We had public affairs programming. We had news... I had a show called Teen Summit, we had a large variety of programming, but the problem is that then the video revolution started up... And then something started happening, and I didn't like it at all. And I remember during those days we would sit up and watch these videos and decide which ones were going on and which ones were not. We got a lot of backlash from recording artists...and we had to start showing them. I didn't like the way women were being portrayed in these videos."

== Sister networks ==
=== Spin-off channels ===
BET has launched several spin-off cable networks over the years, including BET Her (formerly known as "BET on Jazz", then "BET J" and later "Centric"), BET Hip-Hop, and BET Gospel. Over time, spin-offs from sibling channels would be realigned under the BET branding; such as BET Jams (formerly known as "MTV Jams"), BET Soul (formerly known as "VH1 Soul"), SHO×BET (back then, it aired all of sci-fi films, but formerly known as "Showtime Beyond"), a premium Showtime multiplex network, and VH1 (an older-skewing spin-off of MTV that drifted into reality shows and, later, Black American-centric programming).

In May 2019, a BET-branded channel was launched on Pluto TV (which was acquired by its parent company two months earlier). In June 2019, the launch of BET+ was announced, a premium streaming service targeting Black Americans. The service launched in the United States in Autumn 2019 with First Wives Club (which was originally planned to launch on Paramount Network before being shifted to BET) announced as one of the service's original series.

==== BET Gospel ====
BET Gospel
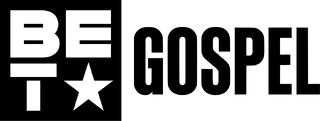

History
- Launched: July 1, 2002; 24 years ago

BET Gospel is a television network in the United States that launched on July 1, 2002. The network provides gospel and religious-related programming, and much of its time is paid for by religious organizations to carry their programming and services.

===== Current programming =====
- Lifted (2016–present) (music videos)
- Being (2016–present)
- Bobby Jones Gospel (2002–present)
- Lift Every Voice (2002–present)
- Celebration of Gospel
- It's a Mann's World (2016–present)
- Let the Church Say Amen (2016–present)
- The Sheards (2016–present)
- T.D. Jakes Presents: Mind, Body, & Soul (2016–present)
- Sunday Best (2016–present)

==== BET Hip-Hop ====
BET Hip-Hop

History
- Launched: July 1, 2002; 24 years ago

BET Hip-Hop is a music video network which is exclusive to digital cable systems. It formerly aired some of BET's original programming such as Rap City, ComicView and the network's video countdown programs. After the 2015 relaunch of the former MTV Jams as BET Jams (which has much wider distribution), the channel's programming was shifted to an automated playlist made up of BET's library of older hip-hop videos. As part of Viacom's 2017 restructuring plan, the network was speculated to slowly wind down operations over time.

==== BET Jams ====
BET Jams
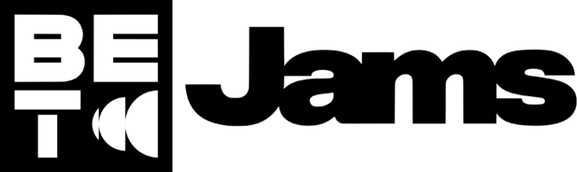
- Broadcast area: United States and Latin America

Programming
- Picture format: 480i SDTV

History
- Launched: May 1, 2002; 24 years ago
- Replaced by: MTV Jams
- Former names: MTV Jams (2002–2015)

BET Jams is an American pay-TV network airing hip-hop and urban contemporary music videos on a thrice-daily automated wheel schedule of eight hours outside of temporary "roadblock" closures during Paramount's awards events, with all of its programming currently denoted in hour blocks as BET Jams – Music Videos within electronic program guide listings.

The channel launched on May 1, 2002, as MTV Jams, and carried that name until October 5, 2015, and was placed under BET's purview as MTV drifted away from music programming. The network space itself launched on August 1, 1998, as MTVX, carrying modern rock videos, and was re-focused around hip-hop music on that date, to some controversy from MTVX's former viewers.

=== International networks ===
==== BET International ====
BET UK first transmitted on Videotron (now known as Virgin Media) and several other subscription providers from 1993 until 1996.

In May 2007 by Ofcom, BET International Inc. was given a license to rebroadcast in the United Kingdom. BET International is the first international version of the channel and is available in the EMEA region through satellite providers. BET launched on February 27, 2008, on Sky channel 191 and began to be carried by Freesat channel 140 on August 8, 2008. BET+1 is also available on Sky channel 198 and Freesat channel 141, and is free-to-air. BET International shows with a mix of content from the main BET channel and locally produced shows. An exclusive, but temporary, HD version of the channel was made to show the 2009 BET Awards on Freesat EPG 142.

BET is additionally an associate member of the Caribbean Cable Cooperative.

BET launched an app called BET Play allowing international access to BET content in over 100 countries in June 2016.

The channel was shut down on April 8, 2021, with its content moved to My5 and Pluto TV.

The channel was also shut down on January 1, 2026, in South Africa, Sub-Saharan Africa and MENA following its restructuring policy by Paramount Skydance due to low ratings.

==== Canada ====
BET became available through most Canadian pay-TV providers on October 17, 1997, though with select programming substituted and blacked out due to domestic broadcast groups owning the rights the shows being broadcast and carrying them on another of their networks.

In 2022, Paramount started to phase out BET in Canada due to expiring rights, a number of major providers began dropping the channel, beginning with Rogers Communications on April 1, 2022, followed by Hay Communications on September 30, 2022, and Shaw Cable and Shaw Direct on August 31, 2023. The Canadian feed was discontinued on all other providers nationwide on January 1, 2025.

==== France ====
Introduced on November 17, 2015. BET France launched across a linear television channel alongside non-linear services including Bouygues Telecom, Canalsat, Numericable/SFR, and Free.

== See also ==
- Scott Mills
- BET Hip Hop Awards
- List of programs broadcast by BET
- New Urban Entertainment
- Rip the Runway
