= Scott Mills (businessman) =

American business executive

- Born: 1969 (age 56–57)
- Occupation: Business executive
- Title: Chief Executive Officer, BET
- Website: Official website

Scott M. Mills (born c. May 12, 1968) is an American business executive. He was chief executive officer of the BET Media Group for 23 years.

== Early life ==
Mills was born around 1969. His mother was a businesswoman and his father was a physician from Long Island, New York. When he was ten years old, Mills realized he wanted to be a businessman. He was inspired by John H. Johnson, whomst he calls a hero.

Mills got his early education at the Waldorf School of Garden City, New York. He attended the Wharton School, where he earned a degree in economics.

== Career ==
After graduating college, Mills worked as deputy treasurer for the City of Philadelphia. He eventually became an investment banker. During that time, he got to know Robert L. Johnson, the founder of Black Entertainment Television (BET). Eventually, Johnson hired Mills to work at BET. He credited Johnson with teaching him how to operate a business, calling his time with Johnson the "Bob Johnson School of Entrepreneurship".

Mills has a 20 year history of working at Viacom. He was executive vice president and chief administrative officer at Viacom for five years. Prior to that, he was chief operating officer at BET. During his earlier tenure with BET, he launched BET's mobile and digital operations, and relaunched the Centric Pay TV network as BET Her. Mills became president of BET in December 2017, replacing Debra L. Lee. In November 2021, Mills was named chief executive officer of BET. He announced he was leaving in December 2025.

== Personal life ==
Mills was married to Iva Mills. They have two children.
