= BET Her =

American pay television channel

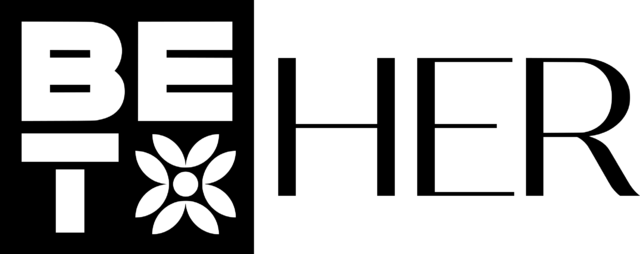
- Country: United States

Programming
- Language: English
- Picture format: 1080i HDTV (downscaled to letterboxed 480i for the SDTV feed)

Ownership
- Owner: Skydance Corporation
- Parent: BET Media Group (CBS Entertainment Group)
- Sister channels: BET; BET Gospel; BET Hip-Hop; BET Jams; BET Soul; SHO×BET

History
- Launched: January 15, 1996; 30 years ago
- Former names: BET on Jazz (1996–2002); BET Jazz (2002–2006); BET J (2006–2009); Centric (2009–2017)

Links
- Website: www.bet.com/bet-her.html

Availability

Streaming media
- Service(s): FuboTV, Hulu + Live TV, Philo, YouTube TV

BET Her is an American basic cable television network currently owned by the BET Media Group subsidiary of Skydance Corporation's CBS Entertainment Group.

The channel originally launched in 1996 as BET on Jazz, a spin-off from BET with a focus on jazz music programming targeting African Americans. By 2006, the network's name was shortened to BET J and was carrying a broader array of music-based, demographic-centric general-interest programming. In 2009, the network relaunched as Centric, with a focus on lifestyle and music programming targeting an upscale audience. Centric would be re-positioned as a general entertainment brand targeting women by 2014, and in 2017, the network would be relaunched under its current name.

As of November 2023, BET Her is available to approximately 33,000,000 pay television households in the United States; down from its 2017 peak of 51,000,000 households.

== History ==
=== Music and general entertainment formats ===
Logo used from 2017 to 2021.

The channel launched on January 15, 1996, as BET on Jazz, as a spin-off channel to BET. It would later be rebranded as BET Jazz in 2002; and BET J, on March 1, 2006. One of the earliest hosts was Angela Stribling, who hosted Jazz Central.

As BET J, the channel's focus shifted from pure jazz programming into general interest offerings. While jazz music still remained the stated primary focus, programming expanded to include a block of Caribbean-oriented programs as well as some R&B, neo soul, reggaetón and alternative hip hop. To a lesser extent, BET J also focused on go-go, electronica and alternative rock. Programs introduced during this era included My Two Cents with Keith Boykin, Bryonn Bain, Crystal McCarey Anthony and Staceyann Chin, The Best Shorts hosted by Abiola Abrams, Living the Life of Marley about Ky-Mani Marley, My Model is Better Than Your Model with Eva Pigford and The Turn On hosted by Charlotte Burley.

On April 24, 2009, network officials announced it would rebrand BET J as Centric, a new general entertainment network with lifestyle and music programming targeting "upscale" African-American adults. The new channel was considered to be a competitor to TV One (owned by rival broadcaster Urban One). Centric's initial lineup primarily featured programming sourced from other BET's corporate siblings, and others that had been previously announced for BET J. The network planned to launch more original programs in 2010, such as the reality series Keeping Up With The Joneses and Model City. The channel also picked up reruns of the music series Soul Train, and revived the Soul Train Music Awards. Centric launched on September 28, 2009; its launch day primetime programming featured a tribute to Michael Jackson.

=== Shift to Woman-centric programming ===
At its 2014 upfronts, BET's parent company (then known as Viacom) announced that it would re-position Centric as a network targeting African-American women. Included in the repositioning was a development deal with Queen Latifah's Flavor Unit Entertainment (which saw a fourth season renewal for its comedy-drama Single Ladies, moving from VH1).

On September 25, 2017, Centric rebranded as BET Her, as part of an ongoing restructuring of Viacom's networks around its flagship brands.

== Programming ==
The channel has produced and aired a limited amount of original programming over the years (including BET Her Presents: The Couch, and the fourth season of VH1's Single Ladies as Centric). Currently, BET Her's main programming consists of reruns and simulcasts of BET programming, along with a morning block of music videos, acquired and syndicated programs, and film telecasts.

=== List of programs broadcast by BET Her ===
As of July 2023.

==== Current ====
- Family Matters
- The Sisaundra Show
- Point Of View
- Hit the Floor
- Let's Make a Deal
- Tyler Perry's Assisted Living
- Tyler Perry's House of Payne
- Tyler Perry's Meet the Browns

===== Music Video Blocks =====
- BET Her Playlist
- Lifted
- Morning Glow
- Reminisce
- Strictly R&B

===== BET Series & Specials =====
- BET Awards Nomination Special
- BET Awards
- BET Hip Hop Awards
- Black Girls Rock!
- Soul Train Music Awards
- The Couch
- The Waiting Room

==== Former ====
- 227
- A Different World
- A Sunday of Worship with Regina & Daniel
- According to Alex
- According to Him + Her
- All Rise
- Almost Married
- Amateur Millionaires Club
- Amen
- American Gangster
- Apollo Live
- Are We There Yet?
- Arise 360
- The A-Team
- Backstage Confidential
- Baldwin Hills
- Beauty and the Baller
- Being
- Being Mary Jane
- The Bernie Mac Show
- BETX Turn Up Party Repeat (2015) (BET Experience highlights special)
- BET J Virtual Awards (2008)
- BET After Dark
- The BET Honors
- BET Start
- BET Start Weekends
- Bob Hearts Abishola
- The Book of Negroes
- The Brian McKnight Show
- Brothers
- Brothers to Brutha
- Centric's 20 to 1 Countdown
- Centric Celebrates Selma (2015) (special)
- Centric Comedy All-Stars (2013)
- Centric Gospel
- Centric Hits (2009)
- Centric Live
- ComicView
- Community Impact Awards (2015)
- The Cosby Show
- Criminals at Work
- CSI: NY
- Culture List
- Daddy's Girls
- Eddie Griffin: Going for Broke
- Eve
- Everybody Hates Chris
- Fame
- Family Feud
- Fantasia for Real
- The First Family
- Flick Centric
- Frankie & Neffe
- From the Bottom Up
- The Fresh Prince of Bel-Air
- The Game
- Get Christie Love!
- Girlfriends
- Got 2B Real: The Diva Variety Show
- Half & Half
- Harlem Heights
- Hell Date
- Homicide: Life on the Street
- The Hot 10 Countdown
- I Want to Work for Diddy
- In Living Color
- In the House
- Instant Mom
- It's a Mann's World
- The Jamie Foxx Show
- Judge Karen
- K. Michelle: My Life
- Keith Sweat's Platinum House
- Keeping Up with the Joneses
- Keyshia Cole: All In
- Keyshia Cole: The Way It Is
- La La's Full Court Life
- Leading Women/Men
- Lens on Talent
- Let's Stay Together
- Let's Talk About Pep
- Luther
- Lyric Cafe
- Making the Band
- Malcolm & Eddie
- Master of the Mix
- McDonald's 365 Black Awards
- Miami Vice
- Model City
- Moesha
- The Montel Williams Show
- Morning Cup (2014)
- Mr. Box Office
- My Current Situation
- My Wife and Kids
- The Nat King Cole Show
- The Neighborhood
- New York Undercover
- Noah's Arc
- The Parkers
- Pitch
- Played by Fame
- The Players' Awards
- The Proud Family
- Queen Boss
- The Queen Latifah Show
- The Real (moved to Bounce TV after being cancelled from BET after three seasons) (day-after repeats)
- Real Husbands of Hollywood
- Reed Between the Lines
- Retro Centric (2009)
- Run's House
- RuPaul's Drag Race
- Rising Icons
- The Salt-N-Pepa Show
- Scandal
- Second Generation Wayans
- Single Ladies
- Sister, Sister
- Smart Guy
- Soul Food
- The Soul Man
- Soul Sessions
- VH1 Soul Stage
- Soul Train
- Soul Train Awards Nomination Special
- 1998 Soul Train Christmas Starfest
- Splash
- The Steve Harvey Project
- The Steve Harvey Show
- Sunday Best
- T.I. & Tiny: The Family Hustle
- Tiny and Shekinah's Weave Trip
- The T.O. Show
- UNCF An Evening of Stars
- The Unit
- Urban Livin'
- Videology
- Video Soul
- Video Vibrations
- The Wayans Bros.
- We Are the Joneses
- The Wendy Williams Show
- Welcome to Dreamland
- What Chilli Wants

== See also ==
- Aspire TV – an American digital cable and satellite channel owned by businessman and former basketball player Magic Johnson.
- BET – The flagship American basic cable and satellite channel of the BET Media Group, currently owned by Paramount Global, which launched in 1980 as the first television network devoted to programming targeting African-Americans.
- Bounce TV – an American digital multicast network owned by E. W. Scripps Company.
- TV One – an American digital cable and satellite channel owned by Urban One
  - Cleo TV – a sister network targeting African-American women
