= VH1 =

American cable television network

- Logo used since 2016 (wordmark in use since 2013)
- Country: United States
- Broadcast area: Nationwide
- Headquarters: New York City

Programming
- Language: English
- Picture format: 1080i HDTV (downscaled to letterboxed 480i for the SDTV feed)

Ownership
- Owner: Skydance Global Cable Media (Skydance)
- Parent: BET Media Group
- Sister channels: list of assets owned by Skydance

History
- Launched: January 1, 1985; 41 years ago
- Replaced: Cable Music Channel
- Former names: VH-1/VH-1: Video Hits One (1985–1994); VH1: Music First (1994–2003)

Links
- Website: www.vh1.com

Availability

Streaming media
- Service(s): DirecTV Stream, FuboTV, Hulu, Philo, Sling TV, YouTube TV
- Affiliated streaming service: Paramount+

VH1 (originally an initialism for Video Hits One) is an American basic cable television network launched on January 1, 1985. It is currently owned by Skydance's BET Media Group, and based in New York City. The network was originally owned by Warner-Amex Satellite Entertainment, a division of Warner Communications (currently WBD), and the original owner of sister channel MTV at the time. It was launched in the channel space of Turner Broadcasting System's short-lived Cable Music Channel.

VH1 was originally conceived to build upon the success of MTV by playing music videos targeting a slightly older demographic focusing on the lighter, softer side of popular music. Like MTV, VH1 ultimately drifted away from music and into reality television programming, albeit with a focus on music personalities, celebrities, and shows targeting African-American audiences. VH1 is best known for franchises such as Behind the Music, the I Love... series, the Celebreality block, Love & Hip Hop, and Basketball Wives.

VH1's visual identity has also undergone several changes over the years, including multiple revisions of its logo and on-air branding. These updates reflected broader shifts in the network's programming strategy and target audience, as VH1 transitioned from a music video–oriented channel to a general entertainment network.

As of December 2023, VH1 is available in approximately 67,481,000 American households, down from 90.2 million in January 2016.

== History ==
VH1, an acronym for Video Hits One, launched on January 1, 1985, over the channel space of Turner's Cable Music Channel. The channel originally focused on music and programming aimed at older audiences than its sibling channel at the time, MTV.

On August 27, 1985, parent company Warner Communications (currently WBD) sold 31% of VH1 and its siblings (MTV and Nickelodeon, which were already divested by Warner into MTV Networks) to Viacom. Viacom would eventually buy the remaining 69% of MTV Networks from Warner for $326 million on May 20, 1986. By 1989, VH1's music programming would cater to Top 40, adult contemporary, classic rock, and 1980s mainstream pop. During the 1990s, VH1 would gain popularity for original music-related programs such as Pop-Up Video, VH1 Video Timeline and Behind the Music.

In the 2000s, VH1 would begin to scale down its music offerings, while shifting its focus to pop culture and nostalgia-based programming; including reality television shows focused on celebrities, and various documentaries and panel shows. Headlining this programming shift would be VH1's Celebreality block, featuring The Surreal Life & its franchise of various spin-offs. One spin-off, Flavor of Love, proved to be a ratings success, and is cited by observers as the beginning of the network's programming leaning towards shows about African-American personalities (such as the Basketball Wives and Black Ink Crew franchises), similar to BET and its sister networks. In 2011, VH1 introduced the first installment of the Love & Hip Hop franchise, which would go on to become the network's longest-running program.

On November 9, 2022, it was announced that oversight of VH1 would move to the BET Media Group under Scott Mills.

== Programming ==
Original programming currently seen on VH1 includes the Love & Hip Hop and the Basketball Wives franchises. Other notable shows and franchises that have aired on the network include Black Ink Crew, The Impact: New York (a spinoff of BET+'s The Impact: Atlanta), RuPaul's Drag Race (which was moved over from Logo, and aired on VH1 from 2017–2022), reruns and new episodes of Nick Cannon Presents: Wild 'N Out (which originated on MTV), and Martha & Snoop's Potluck Dinner Party.

Since the 2010s, and prior to its move to BET, VH1's programming had shifted towards Black-focused personalities and programming, and before urban music was completely de-emphasized from its brand, hip-hop and adult R&B.

== Sister and international networks ==
=== VH1 HD ===
VH1 HD (launched in 2005) is a 1080i high-definition feed, with all major providers carrying the network; as of 2016, this feed was downgraded at providers' headends to provide the network's standard definition channel on their systems.

=== Sister channels in the United States ===
VH1 initially launched four spinoff digital networks as part of The MTV Suite, with another being launched at a later date. By August 2016, these channels spin-offs had either been realigned under the MTV, BET, or CMT branding or were shuttered altogether.

- VH1 Classic: Music videos primarily from the 1960s to the 1990s-decade, concert footage, vintage films, and original programming focused on adult hits, classic hits and classic rock music. Rebranded as MTV Classic on August 1, 2016, in honor of MTV's 35th anniversary, but all of the rebrand's music videos now being switched to the 1980s to the early/mid-2010s.
- VH1 Country: Continuous country music videos. Rebranded as CMT Pure Country (now CMT Music) under CMT on Memorial Day 2006.
- VH1 MegaHits: A channel which played mostly top 40 adult contemporary videos from throughout VH1's history, from the 1980s to the early 2000s. Due to low viewership, the network was discontinued. The satellite space was utilized by MTV Networks to launch LGBTQ-aimed Logo in 2005.
- VH1 Soul: Classic and neo-soul music videos from the past and present, along world music videos by Caribbean and African artists. Rebranded as BET Soul under BET on December 28, 2015, but first being BET Jams in October.
- VH1 Uno: A Spanish-language channel which mostly composed of music videos of Latin pop, rock, and traditional ballads, tropical, salsa and merengue music. Discontinued February 2, 2008, by MTV Networks to expand normal distribution of MTVU beyond college campuses.

=== Internet ===
VH1's website launched in the mid-1990s. In 2003, MTV Networks established VSPOT, a broadband video channel that followed the model of MTV Overdrive, containing the shows aired by VH1 and music videos. Like Overdrive, it was coolly received due to a heavy reliance on broadband and advanced web technologies. VH1 returned to a traditional-style website in late 2007.

=== Defunct international networks ===
As of 2025, Paramount Skydance is not broadcasting any international versions of VH1 due to shutdown:

- VH1 Adria: By the end of September 2012, Serbia, Slovenia, Bosnia and Herzegovina, Northern Macedonia, Bulgaria, Montenegro and Croatia got their regional version of VH1 called VH1 Adria. However, due to financial issues, the channel closed in January 2015 and was replaced by the feed of VH1 Europe.
- VH1 Australia: Since March (April for Optus customers) 2004, VH1 has been available in Australia on Foxtel, Optus Television and Austar. It is also available on SelecTV's pay-TV platform. On May 1, 2010, VH1 Australia was rebranded as MTV Classic.
- VH1 Brasil: The Portuguese-language version of VH1 was launched in Brazil on May 1, 2004. However, VH1 Soul had been available to digital cable subscribers since 2004. In 2007 VH1 Soul stopped being available in Brazil. In 2009 the version HD of VH1 was launched. It closed down on November 14, 2014.
- VH1 MegaHits Brazil: Replaced the Brazilian version of MTV Hits. The channel plays 24-hour charted hits non-stop. Closed down on July 31, 2020.
- VH1 Christmas: A special channel that played Christmas music videos. VH1 Christmas aired on MTV Rocks in the UK and Ireland during the holiday period annually.
- VH1 Denmark: The Danish version of VH1 was launched in Denmark on March 15, 2008. Today the programming still consist of music videos unlike its American counterpart. This was the only international VH1 under Paramount's responsibility, since the Italian version closed in January 2024 until 1 April 2024 and it has been replaced by NickMusic.
- VH1 Europe: The Pan-European VH1 channel has broadcast in the European continent as well as Africa and the Middle East. The channel also airs in Russia and many countries of Latin America, albeit only in Russia it has the "16+" icon on the bottom-right, due to Russia's broadcasting laws. VH1 Europe was replaced with MTV 00s on August 2, 2021.
- VH1 Export: VH1 Export is the technical name used for the version of VH1 European available in the Middle East, Africa, and the Levant territories broadcasting via satellite, exclusively from the OSN pay-TV network. In Africa (on DStv), the channel is exactly the same as VH1 European, but with different adverts. Also VH1 Export has ceased existing on August 2, 2021, and has been replaced by MTV 00s.
- VH-1 Germany: In 1995 to 2001, a German-language version of VH-1 was broadcast, featuring more adult music than MTV, and using the original 1985 to 1987 American logo. It proved unsuccessful and eventually had to make way for a non-stop music channel aimed at teenagers called MTV2 Pop.
- VH1 India: In December 2004, MTV India and Zee-Turner teamed up to bring VH1 to India (later owned by Viacom18). It was the only version of VH1 that used 2003 branding until its shutdown in March 2025. It also aired MTV international shows due to MTV India only airing Indian originals.
- VH1 Indonesia: In Indonesia, VH1 programming were aired on MTV Indonesia at 4 until 8 pm, and on local terrestrial channels such as JakTV, Jakarta, STV Bandung, TV Borobudur, Semarang, TATV, Solo, Batam TV, Batam, and Makassar TV, Makassar and also a full link channel seen on satellite PALAPA C2.
- VH1 Italy: Launched in July 2016, which replaced MTV Music on DTT, which sold the main MTV station to Sky Italia on August 1, 2015. The channel ceased its broadcast on January 7, 2024.
- VH1 Latin America: On April 1, 2004, VH1 Latin America joined MTV and Nickelodeon Latin America targeting audiences 25–49 years old. Until then, the VH1 main channel available for Latin America was the original American version. The Spanish-language channel is tailored for the market and feature a mix of music and entertainment with local and international-recording artists, as well as original programming. VH1 Latin America closed down on October 7, 2020, being replaced by its European counterpart.
- VH1 Pakistan: It was launched in 2008 by Viacom as a joint venture with ARY Digital Network. However, in 2009, the channel was closed due to low ratings and repeated shows.
- VH1 Polska: Launched (or rather renamed) on December 1, 2005. The channel was aimed at people in Poland over 25. The channel was formerly known as "MTV Classic" and (especially in its last months) was the same as present VH1, airing the same programs for the same target group. VH1 Polska closed down in March 2020 being replaced by VH1 Europe.
- VH1 Russia: VH1 Russia launched on December 2, 2005. It ceased broadcasting on July 1, 2010, and was replaced by the European VH1 feed.
- VH1 UK: VH1 UK targeted 25–44 years old and had much of the same content as the main American channel. From 2008 until the last few years of its existence, the channel played music videos, mostly prominently countdowns and artist playlists. However, it shifted its focus to reality and travel shows, ending up with repeats of Are You the One? and Channel 5 's Cruising with Jane McDonald, when it closed down on January 7, 2020. In addition to VH1, there were two sister stations in the UK: VH1 Classic (now MTV Classic) and VH2 (now closed).

In Canada, CHUM Limited launched MuchMoreMusic, a sister channel to MuchMusic (which was considered to be MTV's Canadian counterpart), in 1998. The channel would air the majority of VH1's music and reality programming until 2013.

== See also ==
- History of VH1
- Cable Music Channel
- List of programs broadcast by VH1
- MTV
  - MTV Classic
- Night Tracks
- The Tube Music Network
- Roger Rose
- Video Hits (Australian TV series)
