= MTV Classic (United States) =

American pay television music channel

- Country: United States
- Network: VH1 (1998–2016); MTV (2016–present)
- Headquarters: New York City, New York, United States

Programming
- Language: English
- Picture format: 480i (SDTV)

Ownership
- Owner: Skydance
- Parent: MTV Entertainment Group
- Sister channels: List: MTV; MTV2; MTV Tres; MTV Live; MTVU

History
- Launched: August 1, 1998; 28 years ago
- Former names: VH1 Smooth (1998–1999); VH1 Classic Rock (1999–2000); VH1 Classic (2000–2016)

Links
- Website: www.mtv.com/classic

Availability

Streaming media
- Service(s): DirecTV Stream, FuboTV, Hulu + Live TV, Philo, YouTube TV

MTV Classic (formerly VH1 Smooth, VH1 Classic Rock, and VH1 Classic) is an American pay television network owned by Skydance Global Cable Media (part of Skydance). It was originally launched in 1998 as "VH1 Smooth", an adult contemporary and smooth jazz channel. It was relaunched as "VH1 Classic Rock" in 1999 (later renamed "VH1 Classic" in 2000), with an emphasis on classic rock. On August 1, 2016, in honor of MTV's 35th anniversary, the channel was rebranded as "MTV Classic". The channel currently exclusively airs music videos from all genres from the late 1970s to the early/mid-2010s.

As of December 2019, MTV Classic is available to approximately 39,000,000 pay-TV households in the United States.

== History ==
=== 1998–1999: VH1 Smooth ===
VH1 Smooth launched on August 1, 1998, as a part of MTV's digital cable package, it was initially set to launch a day (in July) earlier, but was delayed. The channel focused on smooth jazz, new age, and adult contemporary music. The first music video to air on the channel was a sax cover of "Makin' Whoopee" by Branford Marsalis.

=== 1999–2016: VH1 Classic ===
VH1 Classic logo (2007–2016)

The channel relaunched on August 1, 1999, as VH1 Classic Rock, which primarily featured a mainstream rock/adult hits-formatted mix of music videos and concert footage from the 1960s to the 1980s, though it originally included a wider range of diverse genres and time periods. The channel was renamed to VH1 Classic in 2000.

The network only played music videos upon launch, but would expand to a varied lineup of music-themed programs. This included themed music video compilation blocks (with categories such as heavy metal music, or popular music of the 1980s), full-length concerts, music documentaries such as the Classic Albums and Behind the Music series, music-oriented films (such as Prince's Purple Rain and The Blues Brothers), and an original talk show, That Metal Show. It also rebroadcast programs first aired on the main VH1, including Pop-Up Video and I Love the '80s.

From January 28 to February 15, 2015, VH1 Classic aired a 19-day marathon of NBC's Saturday Night Live in promotion for the Saturday Night Live 40th Anniversary Special. As a result, the network broke a previous record for the longest continuous marathon in television history set by FXX's twelve-day marathon of the long-running animated The Simpsons.

=== 2016–present: MTV Classic ===
In July 2016, Viacom announced that the network would rebrand as MTV Classic on August 1, 2016 (the 35th anniversary of MTV's launch). The channel's programming would continue to focus on older music videos (with several blocks: Classic Videos (variety), House Of Pop, Rock Block, Total Request Playlist (named after MTV's countdown show), I Want My 80's, 90's Nation, Yo! Hip Hop Mix (focused on rap acts), and a few others), and programming (including films (such as Spice World and others) and notable episodes of MTV Unplugged and Storytellers), but shifted more towards from the 1980s, 1990s and 2000s. The rebranded network's schedule also included repeats of older MTV original series such as the Beavis and Butt-Head 2011 reboot, the original Clone High and Laguna Beach: The Real Orange County. The network was relaunched at 6:00 a.m. ET with a rebroadcast of MTV's first hour on the air, which was also simulcast on MTV and online via Facebook live streaming, titled as "MTV Hour One" (the network, as VH1 Classic, had previously aired it to honor the network's 30th anniversary in 2011). Several VH1 Classic programs were remained in the schedule, albeit in late night hours.

From December 28–30, 2016 (before New Year's Eve), MTV Classic aired a three-day, 24-hour block "Decade-a-thons" composing of music videos from the 1980s to the 2000s. Afterwards, it unveiled an automated all-music video schedule with all film repeats alongside older MTV and VH1 Classic series removed. Since then, the only alteration from the automation has been "roadblock" simulcasts of the MTV Video Music Awards and now-dormant MTV Movie & TV Awards to avoid competition from other Viacom (now Paramount Skydance) networks, as well as occasional marathons of older MTV shows to promote new series or season launches (such as with The Hills to promote The Hills: New Beginnings).

By the end of 2016, the network was one of the least-watched, English-language channels on most American pay-TV providers, averaging only 30–35,000 viewers on an average night in primetime (a decline of nearly a third from the recently-low numbers that it (as VH1 Classic) had in 2015), which was likely a factor in the network quickly discarding their new format after five months. In late May 2017, its numbers had declined even further to an average of 14,000 viewers per night, behind Esquire Network and beIN Sports, which at that time of the year was in its non-prime sports season. The channel's low numbers worsened by the end of July 2017, as that month's ratings showed it averaging 7,000 viewers per night, behind only the beIN networks. If not for the addition of the seven Entertainment Studios Networks to Nielsen monitoring at the end of the year 2017, along with a decline in beIN Sports' ratings, it would have been the lowest-rated, English-language network in 2017, with a 14,000 viewers per night average. Since then, it has frequently remained the fourth-to-last ranked network, behind beIN Sports and ESN's Comedy.TV and its five-network cumulative "ESN Lifestyles" entry for the remainder of its networks.

Occasionally, the channel interrupts regular music video programming to air specific music videos in tribute to recently deceased musicians such as Ozzy Osbourne. Following Tony Bennett's death on July 21, 2023, MTV Classic exclusively aired Bennett's music videos and live performances for the subsequent weekend, regardless of whatever block was scheduled. Some musicians or performers, such as Steve Harwell of the rock band Smash Mouth, had their music videos broadcast periodically throughout the day of their death, blended into regular programming.
