= The Amazing World of Gumball season 2 =

The Amazing World of Gumball
- Season 2
- Cover art for digital download of the second half
- Showrunner: Ben Bocquelet
- No. of episodes: 40

Release
- Original network: Cartoon Network
- Original release: August 7, 2012 – December 3, 2013

Season chronology
- ← Previous; Season 1 Next → Season 3

The second season of the British-American animated television series The Amazing World of Gumball, created by Ben Bocquelet, originally aired on Cartoon Network in the United States, and was produced by Cartoon Network Development Studio Europe. The season debuted on August 7, 2012, and ended on December 3, 2013. This season consists of 40 episodes. The season focuses on the adventures of Gumball Watterson, a blue 12-year-old cat, along with his adopted brother, Darwin, a goldfish. Together, they cause mischief among their family, as well as with the wide array of students at Elmore Junior High.

== Development ==
=== Plot ===
The season focuses on the misadventures of Gumball Watterson, a blue 12-year-old cat, along with his adopted brother, Darwin, a goldfish. Together, they cause mischief among their family, as well as with the wide array of students at Elmore Junior High, where they attend middle school. In a behind-the-scenes video documenting the production of this season, creator Ben Bocquelet expanded on the development of some of the characters, and how they are based on interactions from his childhood.

=== Production ===
The second season began filming on February 7, 2012, and ended filming on June 4, 2013. Before the series premiered on Cartoon Network, a second season was announced in March 2011, consisting of 40 11-minute episodes. Production for the season started in June of the same year. Executive producer and vice president of Cartoon Network Development Studio Europe, Daniel Lennard stated his enthusiasm in the series as "one of the most exciting animation shows to launch in recent years. Commissioning a second series before the first show has aired shows our absolute commitment and belief in the series and we're hoping audiences the world over will embrace this show as much as we have."

Each episode is again directed by Mic Graves, who reprised as a series director. The season also produced the show's first major seasonal special, "Christmas", which premiered in December 2012. An episode entitled "The Rex", that was going to reveal Mr. Rex's (Tina Rex's father) full appearance, was written for this season but never produced for fiscal reasons. The episode's script was later (apparently) rewritten for the show's fourth season's episode "The Routine", although some fans recommended Bocquelet make the episode as part of the next season.

The season marks a visual change from the prior season; Bocquelet states that he and his production staff had to adapt the art style from the first season in order for more complex animations to work within the 2D and 3D environments. In a subsequent interview with World Screen, he retrospectively described the workflow of the season which proved just as difficult as the first for him and his team; he jokingly stated that he and his staff "went into the second series thinking that we were seasoned animation warriors. The second series proved to be quite hard."

== Reception and release ==
=== Ratings ===
The season premiered with the episode "The Remote". The episode was watched by 1.805 million viewers, marking a decrease from the first-season premiere, which had been viewed by 2.120 million viewers for its premiere. The episode with the highest reported viewers for the season was the medial episode, "The Virus", which was watched by 2.570 million viewers. This season had an average of 1.712 million viewers per episode in the United States, a decrease from the previous season which had an average of 1.998 million viewers. The first episode was broadcast on a Tuesday at 8:30 PM. Episodes 2-19 were broadcast Tuesdays at 7:00 PM. Episodes 20-30 were broadcast Wednesdays at 7:30 PM. Episodes 31-40 were broadcast Tuesdays at 7:30 PM.

=== Reviews and accolades ===
Ken Tucker of Entertainment Weekly gave the season premiere "The Remote" a favorable review. In his article, he praised the visuals, namely "the sophisticated composition of the characters and the show's mastery of pop fun [appealing] to older viewers as well [as young viewers]."

== Episodes ==
No. overall	No. in season	Title	Written by	Storyboarded by	Original release date	Prod. code	US viewers (millions)	Streaming no.
37	1	"The Remote"	Ben Bocquelet, Jon Foster, James Lamont, and Mic Graves	Aurelie Charbonnier	August 7, 2012	GB202	1.81	202B
The Wattersons want to watch their shows, only to discover that they all come on at the same time and the family fights for the remote.
38	2	"The Colossus"	Ben Bocquelet, Jon Foster, James Lamont, and Mic Graves	Chuck Klein	August 14, 2012	GB208	1.59	201B
Gumball and Darwin help Hector be more interesting after he rejects their friend request on Elmore Plus and learning about his mother's parenting, only to learn that the latter is to keep Hector the way he is for the good of society.
39	3	"The Knights"	Ben Bocquelet, Jon Foster, James Lamont, and Mic Graves	Aurelie Charbonnier	August 21, 2012	GB201	N/A	201A
Gumball is banned from seeing Penny after her father thinks the entire Watterson family is dysfunctional when passing by, and Tobias swoops in to try to be Penny's love as well. Song: I Wanna Study with Your Daughter
40	4	"The Fridge"	Ben Bocquelet, Jon Foster, James Lamont, and Mic Graves	Sebastian Hary	September 4, 2012	GB203	2.00	202A
Nicole begins recording the other family members' success on a chart hanging on the fridge, and when she finds out Gumball has not achieved anything, she begins pushing him into being a success.
41	5	"The Flower"	Ben Bocquelet, Jon Foster, James Lamont, and Mic Graves	William Laborie and Chuck Klein	September 11, 2012	GB207	1.99	203A
Gumball is overcome with jealousy when he believes Leslie is dating Penny, and his jealousy turns into a demonic entity.
42	6	"The Banana"	Ben Bocquelet, Jon Foster, and James Lamont	Adrian Maganza	September 11, 2012	GB209	1.99	203B
Darwin lends his pen to Banana Joe, but when it comes back chewed, Gumball's thoughts turn to revenge.
43	7	"The Phone"	Ben Bocquelet, Chris Garbutt, and Mic Graves	Sebastian Hary	September 18, 2012	GB204	1.83	204A
When Gumball buys his first cellphone, he gets mad about not getting any calls and gives it to Darwin, who foolishly gives out his number to their intense classmate Ocho. When Darwin gets addicted to the phone, Gumball takes the phone and accidentally sends an insulting message to Ocho, getting the three into a fight.
44	8	"The Job"	Ben Bocquelet, Jon Foster, James Lamont, and Mic Graves	Ben Marsaud	September 18, 2012	GB206	1.83	204B
Richard gets a job as a pizza delivery man, which worries Nicole when, at the same time, strange things begin to occur around the neighborhood. When it becomes apparent that Richard has disrupted the balance of the universe by getting a job, his family desperately tries to get him fired before Richard destroys the universe. Songs: Pizza Rap, Pizza Pizza Pizza
45	9	"Halloween"	Ben Bocquelet, Jon Foster, and James Lamont	Aurelie Charbonnier, William Laborie, and Sebastian Hary (uncredited)	October 23, 2012	GB205	1.71	205A
Carrie takes Gumball, Darwin, and Anais to a real haunted house party on Halloween.
46	10	"The Treasure"	Ben Bocquelet, Jon Foster, James Lamont, and Mic Graves	Ben Marsaud	October 30, 2012	GB211	1.95	205B
Gumball, Darwin, and Anais try to solve an adventurous mystery of why their family cannot afford anything besides cheap knockoffs and non-descript groceries.
47	11	"The Apology"	Ben Bocquelet, Jon Foster, and James Lamont	Adrian Maganza	November 6, 2012	GB215	2.12	206B
Gumball and Darwin are owed apologies by Miss Simian after they are falsely accused of insulting her, but she stubbornly refuses to give them and goes to great lengths to prove that they are bad kids. When that does not work, she tries to frame them instead, which gets her in deep trouble with Principal Brown. Song: We're Rich
48	12	"The Words"	Ben Bocquelet, Jon Foster, and James Lamont	Ben Marsaud	November 13, 2012	GB214	1.83	206A
Darwin is too polite to speak his mind, so Gumball teaches him to be more direct, but this backfires when Darwin starts insulting everyone in the school. Songs: What He Thinks About Us!, No More Mr. Nice Guy!
49	13	"The Skull"	Ben Bocquelet, Jon Foster, James Lamont, and Mic Graves	Akis Dimitrakopoulos	November 20, 2012	GB212	1.86	207A
Clayton accidentally causes destruction in the men's locker room with Gumball and Darwin and lies about what happened to cover up for their deed. However, Gumball and Darwin soon begin to feel his influence—and incur the wrath of an Elmore student who got expelled. NOTE: Most international versions of this episode (including versions shown in the United States) cut an entire sequence showing Gumball, Darwin, and Clayton using electroshock collars to curb their lying.
50	14	"The Bet"	Ben Bocquelet, Jon Foster, and James Lamont	Adrian Maganza	November 27, 2012	GB220	1.62	208B
When Bobert becomes Gumball's servant for a day, Gumball uses the fact that robots obey every single command to his advantage.
51	15	"Christmas"	Ben Bocquelet, Jon Foster, and James Lamont	Chuck Klein and William Laborie	December 4, 2012	GB217	1.70	207B
A homeless man, believed to be Santa Claus, gets accidentally run over by the Wattersons during a visit to Elmore, so it is up to them to save Christmas. Songs: It's Christmas Eve, Christmas is Cancelled NOTE: This episode premiered a day before in the UK.
52	16	"The Watch"	Ben Bocquelet, Jon Foster, and James Lamont	Jean Texier	January 22, 2013	GB219	1.75	208A
Gumball and Darwin are forced to retrieve an old family watch from an elderly neighbor, Marvin Finkleheimer.
53	17	"The Bumpkin"	Ben Bocquelet, Jon Brittain, Jon Foster, James Lamont, and Mic Graves	Akis Dimitrakopoulos	January 29, 2013	GB222	1.84	209A
Envious of his rustic lifestyle, Gumball invites Idaho over to teach the Wattersons how to live outside. Song: Aberdeen
54	18	"The Flakers"	Ben Bocquelet, Jon Foster, and James Lamont	Ben Marsaud	February 5, 2013	GB218	1.65	209B
After bailing on him while getting chased by Tina, Gumball and Darwin have a falling-out and the only way they can make up is with the help of Anais—while all of them have to look after the house and an anesthetic-addled Richard while Nicole is at work.
55	19	"The Authority"	Ben Bocquelet, Jon Brittain, Jon Foster, James Lamont, and Mic Graves	Ben Marsaud	February 12, 2013	GB223	1.78	210A
Richard is put in the hospital after trying to fix the satellite television in the house, so Granny Jojo moves in and safeguards the entire house, causing Gumball, Darwin, and Anais to become fat and unintelligent like Richard.
56	20	"The Virus"	Ben Bocquelet, Jon Foster, and James Lamont	Akis Dimitrakopoulos	June 5, 2013	GB216	2.57	210B
An evil virus seeks vengeance on Gumball, Darwin and Teri after they wipe out his army of bacteria.
57	21	"The Pony"	Ben Bocquelet, Jon Brittain, Mic Graves, Jon Foster, and James Lamont	Ben Marsaud	June 12, 2013	GB225	1.95	211A
Gumball and Darwin rent a film to watch with Anais, but they keep running into distractions on their way home. Song: Don't Know Me
58	22	"The Hero"	Ben Bocquelet, Jon Foster, James Lamont, and Mic Graves	Jean Texier	June 19, 2013	GB210	1.37	213A
Richard becomes saddened when he hears his sons at school thinking of him as a laughing stock, and when Nicole punishes Gumball and Darwin by forbidding them to have anything (including food) until they apologize to Richard for their actions, the boys decide to stage a dangerous rescue in order to make a hero out of Richard. Song: My Little Ones
59	23	"The Dream"	Ben Bocquelet, Jon Brittain, Tom Crowley, Jon Foster, James Lamont, and Tobi Wilson	Adrian Maganza	June 26, 2013	GB226	1.59	212A
Gumball holds a grudge against Darwin after seeing him kiss Penny in a dream.
60	24	"The Sidekick"	Ben Bocquelet, Jon Brittain, Tom Crowley, Jon Foster, James Lamont, and Tobi Wilson	Adrian Maganza	July 3, 2013	GB229	1.76	212B
Gumball and Darwin's attempts to get a game back from Tobias are hampered when Darwin begins to feel like a mere sidekick to Gumball and decides to be the leader by abducting Tobias' mother.
61	25	"The Photo"	Ben Bocquelet, Jon Brittain, Tom Crowley, Jon Foster, James Lamont, and Tobi Wilson	Jean Texier	July 17, 2013	GB228	1.20	213B
Gumball's school photos all look bad, so Alan tries to teach him how to look better.
62	26	"The Tag"	Ben Bocquelet, Jon Brittain, Tom Crowley, Jon Foster, James Lamont, and Tobi Wilson	Akis Dimitrakopoulos	July 24, 2013	GB230	1.42	214A
Richard and Mr. Robinson are both put under house arrest after fighting over a trash can and after trying to continue the fight through Gumball and Darwin, the duo take it upon themselves to end the feud. Song: Baby
63	27	"The Storm"	Ben Bocquelet, Jon Brittain, Jon Foster, and James Lamont	Ben Marsaud	July 31, 2013	GB221	1.57	211B
A plot to improve Alan and Carmen's relationship backfires, and Gumball has to reunite them. NOTE: In the original version, Gumball's line before he accidentally kisses Carmen is "Gumball Watterson may be a lot of things, but he is not a cheap, corruptible bimbo!" Most versions, particularly the version shown on Cartoon Network's American channel, replaces "bimbo" with "coward".
64	28	"The Lesson"	Ben Bocquelet, Jon Brittain, Tom Crowley, Jon Foster, James Lamont, and Tobi Wilson	Akis Dimitrakopoulos	August 7, 2013	GB227	1.42	214B
Gumball and Darwin resort to cheating on their math test after procrastinating on studying for it the day before and end up receiving a detention similar to a maximum security prison over spring break from Principal Brown and meet their school's worst students. Song: The Baddest Kid In Prison
65	29	"The Game"	Ben Bocquelet, Jon Brittain, Tom Crowley, Jon Foster, James Lamont, and Tobi Wilson	Ben Marsaud	August 21, 2013	GB231	1.57	215B
In a parody of Jumanji and Zathura, the Wattersons must survive a gaming session of Gumball and Darwin's old board game, Dodj or Daar, to the end.
66	30	"The Limit"	Ben Bocquelet, Jon Foster, Chris Garbutt, and James Lamont	Sebastian Hary, William Laborie, and Adrian Maganza	August 28, 2013	GB213	1.41	215A
Nicole gets upset with the family at the supermarket when they attempt to get candy, sending them to the car as punishment each time they try to rebel. Their refusal to give up pushes her too far and makes her lose her sanity. Song: Who's Gettin' Candy?
67	31	"The Voice"	Ben Bocquelet, Jon Brittain, Tom Crowley, Jon Foster, James Lamont, and Tobi Wilson	Adrian Maganza	September 10, 2013	GB224	1.96	216B
After mocking everyone on social media, Gumball and Darwin receive a threatening e-mail from somebody anonymous. The pair set out to apologize to everyone at school to avoid the consequences.
68	32	"The Promise"	Ben Bocquelet, Jon Brittain, Tom Crowley, Jon Foster, James Lamont, and Tobi Wilson	Adrian Maganza	September 17, 2013	GB232	1.46	216A
Darwin wants to delay a promise to play video games with Gumball in order to ease tensions with Banana Joe, but Gumball wants his own promise fulfilled so much that he keeps Darwin trapped against his own will.
69	33	"The Castle"	Ben Bocquelet, Jon Brittain, Tom Crowley, Jon Foster, James Lamont, and Tobi Wilson	Jean Texier	October 1, 2013	GB235	1.65	217B
Richard takes charge of the house in Nicole's absence, but his lack of rules soon attracts uninvited guests. Song: Lunch Song
70	34	"The Boombox"	Ben Bocquelet, Jon Brittain, Tom Crowley, Jon Foster, James Lamont, and Tobi Wilson	Jean Texier	October 8, 2013	GB234	1.46	217A
Gumball and Darwin try to help Juke speak properly, but they get too caught up in arguing over how Juke should be treated. Song: Little Squirrel
71	35	"The Tape"	Ben Bocquelet, Jon Foster, and James Lamont	Akis Dimitrakopoulos	October 15, 2013	GB238	1.44	218A
Gumball and Darwin film a series of skits with their video camera, but it fails. Songs: Baby Anais, The Anahilator
72	36	"The Sweaters"	Ben Bocquelet, Jon Foster, and James Lamont	Adrian Maganza	November 5, 2013	GB237	1.58	218B
To their uninterest, Gumball and Darwin's reputations are challenged by two human students named Carlton and Troy from a neighboring high school, after a new girl named Sarah urges Gumball and Darwin to defend their honor. Song: The Power to Fight
73	37	"The Internet"	Yann Benedi, Ben Bocquelet, Guillaume Cassuto, and Antoine Perez	Chuck Klein	November 12, 2013	GB239	1.50	219A
Gumball accidentally uploads a video of himself to Elmore Stream which goes viral and must personally confront the Internet to take it down. Song: Internet Song
74	38	"The Plan"	Ben Bocquelet, Jon Foster, James Lamont, and Tobi Wilson	Charles Schneck	November 19, 2013	GB240	1.53	219B
Thinking that their mother is being courted by a man named "Daniel Lennard", the Watterson siblings come up with a plan to save her, but end up wasting their time trying to devise it.
75	39	"The World"	Ben Bocquelet, Jon Brittain, Tom Crowley, Jon Foster, James Lamont, and Tobi Wilson	Chuck Klein	November 26, 2013	GB236	1.88	220A
The lives of the "inanimate" objects of Elmore are shown in a series of short skits. Song: The Amazing World of Elmore
76	40	"The Finale"	Ben Bocquelet, Jon Brittain, Tom Crowley, Jon Foster, James Lamont, and Tobi Wilson	Akis Dimitrakopoulos	December 3, 2013	GB233	1.63	220B
In this send-up of family sitcom clip show episodes and series finales, the Wattersons are targeted by everyone in town for their past actions.

== DVD releases ==
Volume 4 (Season 2 Volume 1)
Set details	Special features	
12 episodes (Episodes: "The Remote" – "The Words"); 1-disc DVD set; 1.78:1 aspect ratio; Languages: English (Dolby Stereo); Subtitles: English SDH	None	
DVD release dates
Region 1	Region 2	Region 4
November 4, 2013	N/A	N/A
