= List of The Adventures of Paddington episodes =

The Adventures of Paddington (French: Les aventures de Paddington) is an animated television series developed for television by Jon Foster and James Lamont. The series is co-produced by StudioCanal and Heyday Films, with the participation of Nickelodeon, M6 and Piwi+. The animation for the series is produced by Blue Zoo and Superprod Animation. The series is based on the Paddington Bear franchise. The series airs on Nickelodeon internationally, except in France where the series airs on Gulli and later on M6 and Piwi+.

== Series overview ==
Season	Segments	Episodes	Originally released	
Season	Segments	Episodes	First released	Last released
1	53	41	December 20, 2019	December 18, 2020
2	53	50	February 19, 2021	October 1, 2022
3	48	34	April 3, 2023	February 21, 2025

== Episodes ==
=== Season 1 (2019–20) ===
No. overall	No. in season	Title	Written by	Original release date	Prod. code	U.S. viewers (millions)
1	1	"Paddington Finds a Pigeon"	Jon Foster & James Lamont	December 20, 2019	101	
1	1	"Paddington and the Chores List"	Jon Foster & James Lamont	December 20, 2019	101	
2	2	"Paddington Finds a Hobby"	Jon Foster & James Lamont	January 20, 2020	106	0.87
2	2	"Paddington and the Stamp"	Jon Foster & James Lamont	January 20, 2020	106	0.87
3	3	"Paddington and the Magic Trick"	Jon Foster & James Lamont	January 21, 2020	103	
3	3	"Paddington and Poor Mr. Curry"	Jon Foster & James Lamont	January 21, 2020	103	
4	4	"Paddington Makes Pancakes"	Jon Foster & James Lamont	January 22, 2020	102A	0.45
5	5	"Paddington Plays Football"	Jon Foster & James Lamont	January 23, 2020	102B	0.46
6	6	"Paddington and the Treehouse"	Jon Foster & James Lamont	January 27, 2020	104A	0.41
7	7	"Paddington and the Monster Hunt"	Toby Davies	January 28, 2020	104B	0.52
8	8	"Paddington and the Painting"	Jon Foster & James Lamont	January 29, 2020	105A	0.48
9	9	"Paddington Finds Buried Treasure"	Jon Foster & James Lamont	January 30, 2020	105B	0.38
10	10	"Paddington and the Wardrobe"	Paul Doolan	February 24, 2020	107A	0.46
10	10	"Paddington Learns the Violin"	Jon Foster & James Lamont	February 24, 2020	108B	0.46
11	11	"Paddington Helps With Homework"	Jon Foster & James Lamont	February 25, 2020	107B	0.43
12	12	"Paddington Makes a Scrapbook"	Jon Foster & James Lamont	February 26, 2020	109A	0.35
13	13	"Paddington Digs a Tunnel to Peru"	Jon Foster & James Lamont	February 27, 2020	109B	0.53
14	14	"Paddington Plans a Party"	Jon Foster & James Lamont	March 16, 2020	108A	0.60
15	15	"Paddington and the Meteor Shower"	Toby Davies	March 18, 2020	110A	0.63
16	16	"Paddington and the Talent Show"	Jon Foster & James Lamont	March 19, 2020	110B	0.48
17	17	"Paddington Meets Lucky"	Jon Foster & James Lamont	March 27, 2020	113	0.72
17	17	"Paddington and the Love Day Cards"	Hannah George	March 27, 2020	113	0.72
18	18	"Paddington and the Lost Gerbil"	Paul Doolan	May 15, 2020	111	0.35
18	18	"Paddington Earns a Ranger Badge"	Adam Redfern	May 15, 2020	111	105.0
19	19	"Paddington Flies a Kite"	Madeleine Lambur	June 26, 2020	112	
19	19	"Paddington the Detective"	Jen Upton	June 26, 2020	112	
20	20	"Paddington and the Finger Trap"	Jon Foster & James Lamont	July 3, 2020	114	271.0
20	20	"Paddington Rides a Scooter"	Davey Moore	July 3, 2020	114	331.0
21	21	"Paddington's First Chinese New Year"	Mark Huckerby & Nick Ostler	July 10, 2020	115	0.26
21	21	"Paddington and the Missing Tickets"	Holly Lamont	July 10, 2020	115	0.26
22	22	"Paddington and the Summer Games"	Adam Redfern	July 17, 2020	116	0.29
22	22	"Paddington Goes Camping"	Jon Foster & James Lamont	July 17, 2020	116	0.29
23	23	"Paddington and the Bone"	Jon Foster & James Lamont	July 24, 2020	118	129.0
23	23	"Paddington Joins a Band"	Jon Foster & James Lamont	July 24, 2020	118	146.0
24	24	"Paddington and the Fundraising Day"	Paul Doolan	July 31, 2020	117	202.0
24	24	"Paddington's Alien Adventure"	Toby Davies	July 31, 2020	117	168.0
25	25	"Paddington and the Fire Engine"	Jon Foster & James Lamont	August 7, 2020	121A	114.0
26	26	"Paddington Joins a Club"	Hannah George	August 14, 2020	121B	0.40
27	27	"Paddington Builds a Scarecrow"	Paul Doolan	August 21, 2020	122A	0.30
28	28	"Paddington Plays Hide and Seek"	Madeleine Lambur	August 28, 2020	122B	0.23
29	29	"Paddington and the House Guest"	Holly Lamont	September 4, 2020	123A	0.24
30	30	"Paddington and the Banana"	Jon Foster & James Lamont	September 11, 2020	123B	N/A
31	31	"Paddington Chooses a Best Friend"	Jon Foster & James Lamont	September 18, 2020	124A	0.33
32	32	"Paddington and the Lamppost"	Paul Doolan	September 25, 2020	124B	0.35
33	33	"Paddington and Halloween"	Toby Davies	October 2, 2020	120A	0.22
34	34	"Paddington Has an Autumn Wish"	Holly Lamont	October 9, 2020	120B	0.31
35	35	"Paddington Runs the Café"	Toby Davies	October 16, 2020	126A	0.27
36	36	"Paddington Makes a Film"	Holly Lamont	October 23, 2020	126B	0.33
37	37	"Paddington's First Snow"	Toby Davies	October 30, 2020	125A	0.27
38	38	"Paddington and the Metal Detector"	Paul Doolan	November 6, 2020	125B	123.0
39	39	"Paddington and the Lost Letter"	Jon Foster, James Lamont & Adam Redfern	November 27, 2020	127	0.19
40	40	"Paddington Meets a Police Officer"	Hannah George	December 11, 2020	119A	0.38
41	41	"Paddington and the Balloons"	Jon Foster & James Lamont	December 18, 2020	119B	

=== Season 2 (2021–22) ===
No. overall	No. in season	Title	Written by	Original release date	Prod. code	U.S. viewers (millions)
42	1	"Paddington's Plant Problem"	Holly Lamont	February 19, 2021	201	0.21
42	1	"Paddington the Artist"	Jon Foster & James Lamont	February 19, 2021	201	0.21
43	2	"Paddington's Squirrel Surprise"	Jon Foster & James Lamont	February 26, 2021	202A	N/A
44	3	"Paddington Becomes a Secret Agent"	Toby Davies	March 5, 2021	202B	0.32
45	4	"Paddington Clowns Around"	Paul Doolan	March 12, 2021	203A	N/A
46	5	"Paddington and the Bad Swap"	Jon Foster & James Lamont	March 19, 2021	203B	0.31
47	6	"Paddington Celebrates Mrs. Bird's Day"	Hannah George	March 26, 2021	204A	0.31
48	7	"Paddington the Table Tennis Champ"	Jon Foster & James Lamont	April 2, 2021	204B	0.29
49	8	"Paddington Gets Fit"	Jon Foster & James Lamont	May 21, 2021	205A	0.20
50	9	"Paddington's Rockingchair Repair"	Paul Doolan	May 28, 2021	205B	0.28
51	10	"Paddington and the Big Decision"	Jon Foster & James Lamont	June 4, 2021	207A	0.28
52	11	"Paddington's Beach Stowaway"	Jon Foster & James Lamont	June 11, 2021	207B	0.27
53	12	"Paddington and the Caterpillar"	Jon Foster & James Lamont	June 18, 2021	208A	0.20
54	13	"Paddington Plays the Floor is Lava"	Toby Davies	June 25, 2021	208B	0.20
55	14	"Paddington and the Vegetable Thief"	Hannah George	July 2, 2021	206A	0.23
56	15	"Paddington Takes to the Ice"	Holly Lamont	July 9, 2021	206B	0.30
57	16	"Paddington's Space Adventure"	Toby Davies	August 13, 2021	209A	0.33
58	17	"Paddington's Blackberry Treasure"	Jason Hazeley	August 20, 2021	209B	0.28
59	18	"Paddington Opens the City Farm"	Jon Foster & James Lamont	August 27, 2021	210A	0.17
60	19	"Paddington the Upcycler"	Holly Lamont	September 3, 2021	210B	0.28
61	20	"Paddington's Lucky Day"	Holly Lamont	September 10, 2021	211A	0.36
62	21	"Paddington the Pizza Chef"	Jon Foster & James Lamont	September 17, 2021	211B	0.27
63	22	"Paddington and the Tooth Fairy"	Emma Kennedy	September 24, 2021	212A	0.15
64	23	"Paddington Goes to Work"	Paul Doolan	October 1, 2021	212B	0.22
65	24	"Paddington's New Neighbours"	Jon Foster & James Lamont	October 8, 2021	213A	0.26
66	25	"Paddington Makes the News"	Jon Foster & James Lamont	October 15, 2021	213B	0.14
67	26	"Paddington Shares a Good Deed"	Toby Davies	October 22, 2021	214A	0.20
68	27	"Paddington Goes Green"	Abigail Burdess	October 29, 2021	214B	0.16
69	28	"Paddington Saves the Bees"	Holly Lamont	November 5, 2021	215A	0.10
70	29	"Paddington and the Heatwave"	Jon Foster & James Lamont	November 12, 2021	215B	0.19
71	30	"Paddington Visits the Doctor"	Jon Foster & James Lamont	November 19, 2021	216A	0.23
72	31	"Paddington and the Sleep Over"	Jon Foster & James Lamont	November 26, 2021	216B	0.19
73	32	"Paddington Gets Locked Out on Christmas Day"	Holly Lamont	December 3, 2021	221	0.16
73	32	"Paddington Feels the Music"	Jon Foster & James Lamont	December 3, 2021	221	0.16
74	33	"Paddington and the Egg Hunt"	Hannah George	December 10, 2021	218A	0.17
75	34	"Paddington Sells Bessie"	Paul Doolan	December 17, 2021	218B	0.21
76	35	"Paddington's Nature Club"	Holly Lamont	December 24, 2021	219A	0.14
77	36	"Paddington's Not Himself"	Jon Foster & James Lamont	December 31, 2021	219B	0.10
78	37	"Paddington's Treasure Hunt"	Adam Redfern	January 7, 2022	220A	0.16
79	38	"Paddington's Taste of Italy"	Jo Clegg & Toby Davies	January 14, 2022	220B	0.17
80	39	"Paddington's Radio Show"	Jon Foster & James Lamont	January 25, 2022	222A	0.18
81	40	"Paddington's Butler"	Toby Davies	February 1, 2022	222B	0.16
82	41	"Paddington Becomes a Talent Show Judge"	Jon Foster & James Lamont	February 8, 2022	223A	0.23
83	42	"Paddington Keeps Up with The Kamalis"	Paul Doolan	February 15, 2022	223B	0.24
84	43	"Paddington's Pet Hotel"	Hannah George	February 22, 2022	224A	0.25
85	44	"Paddington Plays Golf"	Jon Foster & James Lamont	March 1, 2022	224B	0.21
86	45	"Paddington Loves Windsor Gardens"	Toby Davies	March 8, 2022	226A	0.21
87	46	"Paddington Helps a Hedgehog"	Jon Foster & James Lamont	March 15, 2022	226B	0.17
88	47	"Paddington's Birthday Treat"	Jon Foster & James Lamont	March 22, 2022	227	0.29
89	48	"Paddington and the Hatching Surprise"	Jon Foster & James Lamont	March 29, 2022	217A	0.21
90	49	"Paddington the Best Bear"	Paul Doolan	April 5, 2022	217B	0.21
91	50	"Paddington and the Halloween Mystery"	Jon Foster & James Lamont	October 1, 2022	225	0.19
91	50	"Paddington's Campfire Stories"	Jon Foster & James Lamont	October 1, 2022	225	0.19

=== Season 3 (2023–25) ===
No. overall	No. in season	Title	Written by	Original release date	Prod. code	U.S. viewers (millions)
92	1	"Paddington's Goo Monster"	Holly Lamont	April 3, 2023	301A	N/A
93	2	"Paddington's Apple Pip Adventure"	Jon Foster & James Lamont	April 4, 2023	301B	0.17
94	3	"Paddington and the Lake Monster"	Holly Lamont	April 5, 2023	302A	0.11
95	4	"Paddington's Space Radio"	Racha Sobratee	April 6, 2023	302B	0.18
96	5	"Paddington and the Three Musketeers"	Michelle Membu-Philip	April 10, 2023	303A	0.09
97	6	"Paddington and the Dinosaur Hunt"	Jon Foster & James Lamont	April 11, 2023	303B	0.14
98	7	"Paddington's Journey Into a Black Hole"	Hannah George	April 12, 2023	304A	0.24
99	8	"Paddington's Rainbow Race!"	Zahara Andrews	April 13, 2023	304B	0.17
100	9	"Paddington Meets Paddingtron"	Paul Doolan	April 17, 2023	305A	N/A
101	10	"Paddington's First Diwali"	Joe Sellman-Leava	April 18, 2023	305B	0.16
102	11	"Paddington and the Solar Eclipse"	Toby Davies	April 19, 2023	306A	0.12
103	12	"Paddington and the Mysterious Inventor"	Adam Redfern	April 20, 2023	306B	0.12
104	13	"Paddington's Summer Holiday Begins"	Toby Davies	August 7, 2023	307A	N/A
105	14	"Paddington's Lifeguard Training"	Jon Foster & James Lamont	August 8, 2023	307B	N/A
106	15	"Paddington's Mysterious Cave Discovery"	Jon Foster & James Lamont	August 9, 2023	308A	N/A
107	16	"Paddington and the Fossil Hunt"	Holly Lamont	August 10, 2023	308B	0.10
108	17	"Paddington vs the Seagulls"	Paul Doolan	August 14, 2023	309A	0.17
109	18	"Paddington and the Lighthouse"	Jon Foster & James Lamont	August 15, 2023	309B	0.10
110	19	"Paddington's Pirate Treasure Hunt"	Jon Foster & James Lamont	August 16, 2023	310A	0.19
111	20	"Paddington's Sandcastle Showstopper"	Jon Foster & James Lamont	August 17, 2023	310B	0.09
112	21	"Paddington's Puffling Rescue"	Holly Lamont	August 20, 2023	311	N/A
112	21	"Paddington Goes Under the Sea"	Hannah George	August 20, 2023	311	N/A
113	22	"Paddington's Beach Clean Up"	Michelle Membu-Philip	August 20, 2023	312	N/A
113	22	"Paddington's Holiday Farewell"	Holly Lamont	August 20, 2023	312	N/A
114	23	"Paddington and the Cursed Halloween Show"	Holly Lamont	October 30, 2023	319	N/A
114	23	"Paddington Saves the Mooncake Festival"	Holly Lamont	October 30, 2023	319	N/A
115	24	"Paddington's Special Visitor"	Jon Foster & James Lamont	December 8, 2023	322	N/A
115	24	"Paddington Celebrates Hanukkah"	Eleanor Burke	December 8, 2023	322	N/A
116	25	"Paddington's Hero Squad"	Holly Lamont	February 10, 2025	313	N/A
116	25	"Paddington's Knightly Quest"	Paul Doolan	February 10, 2025	313	N/A
117	26	"Paddington the Rare Bear and Mr. Brilliant"	Joe Sellman-Leva	February 11, 2025	314	N/A
117	26	"Paddington and the Accidental Hero"	Holly Lamont	February 11, 2025	314	N/A
118	27	"Paddington's Race Against the Storm"	Jon Foster & James Lamont	February 12, 2025	315	N/A
118	27	"Paddington's Super Snail"	Toby Davies	February 12, 2025	315	N/A
119	28	"Paddington and Padding-tron's Heroic Day"	Hannah George	February 13, 2025	316	N/A
119	28	"Paddington's Heroic Non-Stop Adventure"	Toby Davies	February 13, 2025	316	N/A
120	29	"Paddington and the Unlikely Hero"	Jon Foster & James Lamont	February 14, 2025	317	N/A
120	29	"Paddington Needs a Hero"	Holly Lamont	February 14, 2025	317	N/A
121	30	"Paddington's Favourite Hero"	Zahara Andrews	February 17, 2025	318	N/A
121	30	"Paddington and the Skateboarder"	Jon Foster & James Lamont	February 17, 2025	318	N/A
122	31	"Paddington's Birthday Gift Hunt"	Jon Foster & James Lamont	February 18, 2025	320	N/A
122	31	"Paddington's Burn's Night Haggis Hunt"	Jon Foster & James Lamont	February 18, 2025	320	N/A
123	32	"Paddington's Earth Day Mission"	Racha Sobratee	February 19, 2025	321	N/A
123	32	"Paddington Special Spring Harvest Celebration"	Joe Sellman-Leava	February 19, 2025	321	N/A
124	33	"Paddington's Adventure Club Cracks The Case!"	Paul Doolan	February 20, 2025	323	N/A
124	33	"Paddington and Aunt Lucy's Special Recipe"	Toby Davies	February 20, 2025	323	N/A
125	34	"Paddington's Football Dilemma"	Jon Foster & James Lamont	February 21, 2025	324	N/A
125	34	"Paddington Has to Say Goodbye"	Zahara Andrews	February 21, 2025	324	N/A
