= The Amazing World of Gumball season 1 =

The Amazing World of Gumball
- Season 1
- Cover art for The Party, the most recent home video release containing episodes of the first season
- Showrunner: Ben Bocquelet
- No. of episodes: 36

Release
- Original network: Cartoon Network
- Original release: May 3, 2011 – March 13, 2012

Season chronology
- Next → Season 2

The first season of the British-American animated comedy children's television series The Amazing World of Gumball originally aired from May 3, 2011, to March 13, 2012, on Cartoon Network, and was produced by Cartoon Network Development Studio Europe, in association with Boulder Media and Dandelion Studios. Consisting of 36 episodes, the season premiered with the episode "The DVD" and concluded with the episode "The Fight". The season premiere was watched by 2.120 million viewers in the United States.

== Development ==
=== Plot ===
The season focuses on the misadventures of Gumball Watterson, a blue 12-year-old cat, along with his adopted brother, Darwin, a 10-year-old goldfish. Together, they cause mischief among their family, as well as with the wide array of students at Elmore Junior High, where they attend middle school. In a behind-the-scenes video documenting the production of the second season, creator Ben Bocquelet expanded on the development of some of the characters, and how they are based on interactions from his childhood.

=== Production ===
The first season began filming on November 2, 2010, and ended filming on September 13, 2011. The first season premiered in the US on May 3, 2011, with the episode "The DVD" and ended March 12, 2012, with the episode "The Fight" almost a year later. The world premiere of the show was on May 11, 2011, on Cartoon Network UK with the episode "The Mystery".

Every episode in the first season was directed by Mic Graves, having been hired by Ben Bocquelet to direct the series. Two episodes, entitled "The Mom" and "The Pizza", were written for this season, but never produced. However, the concept of the former was reused in the show's third season's episode "The Mothers"; and the concept of the latter was reused in the show's second season's episode "The Job" but then, it became an episode of the show's third season with the same name "The Pizza". Two more episodes were never produced like the aforementioned, but their plots and titles are still unknown.

== Reception ==
=== Ratings ===
The season premiere "The DVD" was watched by 2.120 million viewers in the United States, and received a 0.4 rating in the 18–49 demographic Nielsen household rating. Nielsen ratings are audience measurement systems that determine the audience size and composition of television programming in the United States, which means that the episode was seen by 0.8 percent of all 18- to 49-year-olds at the time of the broadcast. This season had an average of 2.00 million viewers per episode in the United States. "The DVD", the first episode of the season, was broadcast on a Tuesday night at 8:30 pm. All episodes of the season from "The Responsible" to "The Club" were broadcast on Monday nights at 7:30 pm. All remaining episodes of the season, starting with "The Wand", were broadcast on Tuesday nights at 7:30 pm.

=== Critical reception ===
The A.V. Club's Noel Murray graded the DVD release of the series' first 12 episodes a B+, writing that "what sets [The Amazing World of Gumball] apart from the many other super-silly, semi-anarchic cartoons on cable these days is that it features such a well-developed world, where even with the eclectic character designs, there are recognizable traits and tendencies." "Z." of GeekDad gave the first volume DVD a positive review; he praised the season for having "genuine heart even as the plots themselves transition from well-worn TV tropes to all out madness." He panned the lack of extra features on the disc, but said "[the disc] at least gives viewers the opportunity to experience the show's delightful theme song, ... often truncated during television broadcasts".

Tyler Foster of DVD Talk gave the first season a lukewarm review. In reviewing the first DVD volume, he praised the "knockout" visuals but felt the animation was "relatively simple, even when it's going exaggerated for a gag." He was weary of the morals presented in the premiere, and found the comedy throughout the volume "anemic". He criticized the lack of extra features on the disk, saying the single character gallery "was so anemic I can't even give it half a star." DVD Verdict reviewer Paul Pritchard gave the first volume 88 out of 100. He praised the season for its visuals, which he felt complemented the series' "anarchic nature". He stated that while the moral lessons aimed toward family audiences, he stated that, "in something of a twist, such lessons are completely lost on Gumball and his pals—something I personally took great delight in." However, he wrote that the lack of a selection extras was "pretty poor." Mac McEntire of the same website also applauded the season's visuals but stated "laughs are hit or miss", and that the randomness of the humor was "its biggest detriment"; he gave the second volume 75 out of 100. Nancy Basile of About.com favored "The Ghost" out of the third DVD volume; she praised the series as a "smart, fast-paced, hilarious cartoon."

== Episodes ==
These episodes are listed in their original broadcast order with their streaming episode numbers mentioned. Notably, the complete series DVD release lists "The End/The DVD" to be the first episode, even though the streaming release lists it as the finale to the season.

No. overall	No. in season	Title	Written by	Storyboarded by	Original release date	Prod. code	US viewers (millions)	Streaming no.
1	1	"The DVD"	Ben Bocquelet, Jon Foster, and James Lamont	Ben Marsaud	May 3, 2011	GB120	2.12	118B
After they accidentally destroy a rental DVD that was overdue for return, Gumball and Darwin try a series of schemes to pay off the $25 replacement fee before Nicole finds out. However, their plan fails to dodge Nicole's parental powers as she discovers the fee and chases them down.
2	2	"The Responsible"	Ben Bocquelet, Andrew Brenner, Jon Foster, Mic Graves, and James Lamont	Celine Gobinet	May 9, 2011	GB111	1.39	103A
Gumball and Darwin attempt to show their responsibility by babysitting Anais while their parents are at a school meeting. Their attempts to be responsible prove too restricting for the more intellectual Anais, and she soon rebels against her brothers and destroys the house.
3	3	"The Third"	Ben Bocquelet, Jon Foster, James Lamont, and Sam Ward	George Gendi	May 16, 2011	GB109	1.96	101A
Gumball and Darwin grow bored of one another and seek out a third friend to make their lives more exciting. They find a new buddy in their classmate Tobias, but Gumball soon becomes jealous when Darwin starts spending more time with him.
4	4	"The Debt"	Ben Bocquelet, Jon Foster and James Lamont	George Gendi, Dave Smith, Philip Warner, and Chuck Klein	May 16, 2011	GB110	1.96	101B
Believing that his life has been saved by Mr. Robinson, Gumball vows to repay his debt by saving Mr. Robinson's life. His acts either annoy or injure Robinson, and as he goes on to perform, Anais and Darwin plan to fake an assassination attempt to lift Gumball's spirits. Song: I Want to Be Free
5	5	"The End"	Ben Bocquelet, Jon Foster and James Lamont	Ben Marsaud	May 23, 2011	GB135	1.89	118A
Gumball and Darwin think that the world will end in 24 hours at the beginning of an impending solar eclipse. The misunderstanding escalates, and the boys discover that their perceptions were wrong as the eclipse passes and nothing happens.
6	6	"The Dress"	Ben Bocquelet, Mic Graves, and David Cadji-Newby	Chris Garbutt	May 23, 2011	GB112	1.89	103B
When his clothes are accidentally shrunk in the washing machine by Richard, Gumball is forced to crossdress by wearing Nicole's wedding dress to school. Soon, everyone at his school thinks that Gumball in the dress is a beautiful girl. Though Gumball revels in his newfound popularity, he is disgusted after learning that Darwin has developed a crush on his feminine persona. Gumball sets up a fake going-away party to let Darwin down easy; it works, but Gumball ends up embarrassed after his classmates see him naked. Song: Fine Lady
7	7	"The Quest"	Ben Bocquelet, Jon Foster and James Lamont	Aurelie Charbonnier and Chuck Klein	May 30, 2011	GB118	1.90	114A
Gumball and Darwin help Anais get her beloved Daisy the Donkey doll back after it is lost on the way to school and gets taken by Tina Rex. The three sneak into her junkyard home and reclaim the doll, but they accidentally awaken Tina, resulting in a chase; after Tina expresses her fear of the dark, Anais allows Tina to keep the doll out of compassion.
8	8	"The Spoon"	Ben Bocquelet, Jon Foster, James Lamont, and Mic Graves	Ben Marsaud	May 30, 2011	GB106	1.90	114B
While buying a last-minute birthday gift for their mom, Gumball and Darwin become unwitting accomplices in a stick-up at a gas station. After Nicole, Richard and Anais are taken hostage, the boys discover the truth and prevent the thief from taking the money.
9	9	"The Pressure"	Ben Bocquelet, Jon Foster, James Lamont, and Sam Ward	Aurelie Charbonnier	June 6, 2011	GB115	2.18	102A
When Masami claims that Darwin is her boyfriend, Gumball vows to help his friend before he gets kissed by her but is constantly distracted by his crush Penny. At a treehouse the girls hang out in, Darwin (unwillingly) and Gumball (just to be near Penny) are dragged along, but Tobias and Banana Joe cut down the treehouse, and the boys' attempt to kiss their respective girls ends in them unknowingly kissing each other.
10	10	"The Painting"	Ben Bocquelet, Jon Foster, James Lamont, and Mic Graves	Ben Marsaud	June 13, 2011	GB107	1.96	102B
Nigel Brown assumes that Anais finds her family dysfunctional after seeing a picture drawn by her, so he begins to meddle in their family life; he forces Nicole to relax, Richard to get a job, and enrolls Gumball and Darwin in a behavioral program. Although the results end up much worse, Anais manages to get everyone to listen to her and explain the painting's true meaning.
11	11	"The Laziest"	Ben Bocquelet, Jon Foster, James Lamont, and Mic Graves	George Gendi, Ben Marsaud, and Amandine Pécharman	June 20, 2011	GB121	N/A	104A
Gumball and Darwin challenge Richard to a laziness competition, with the loser having to do the winner's chores. However, they soon struggle and decide to call a time-out and find someone to help them; they discover that Larry Needlemeyer, a store cashier, was once lazy, but left it all behind after getting his life together. The boys insistently ask him to help them in their lazy-off, causing Larry to lose his job, car and girlfriend. Their plan fails when Larry refuses to show up, and decide to continue themselves; as Richard hears Nicole arriving home, he forfeits to bait them into being forced to do chores. Songs: Sugar Rush Song, Please Do It Larry!, We Won!
12	12	"The Ghost"	Ben Bocquelet, Jon Foster, James Lamont, and Mic Graves	George Gendi and Phillip Warner	June 27, 2011	GB108	N/A	104B
Gumball's classmate Carrie, a ghost, is unhappy over her inability to eat. Darwin unsupportively offers she possess Gumball's body, and after doing so, she sends him on a voracious junk-food spree; as her possessions and wild food runs continue, Gumball must learn to say "No" to drive her off.
13	13	"The Mystery"	Ben Bocquelet, Jon Foster, James Lamont, and Mic Graves	George Gendi and Phillip Warner	July 11, 2011	GB113	2.53	105A
When the class finds a disfigured Principal Brown in Gumball's school locker, the entire class blames him; Gumball decides to find clues as to who truly did it, discovering that Miss Simian (as well as some random occurrences from Penny, Rocky and Darwin) had caused the incident.
14	14	"The Prank"	Ben Bocquelet, Jon Foster, and James Lamont	George Gendi	July 18, 2011	GB123	1.91	105B
Gumball, Darwin and Richard start a prank war, but the boys' pranks against their father hopelessly begin spiraling out of control, causing chaos in the Watterson household. Songs: I'm a Ballerina, A Music Video
15	15	"The Gi"	Ben Bocquelet, Jon Foster, and James Lamont	Rob Latimer	July 25, 2011	GB124	2.30	106A
Gumball and Darwin are ridiculed for their martial arts costumes by their schoolmates, and Nicole tries to convince them to take them off, but after witnessing Penny defend them, she realizes that everyone deserves a chance to be themselves. Songs: The Inner Warrior, No More Gi
16	16	"The Kiss"	Ben Bocquelet and Mic Graves	George Gendi, Kent Osborne, and Darren Vandenburg	August 1, 2011	GB119	2.18	106B
Gumball is accidentally kissed by his visiting Granny Jojo and, unable to forget the experience, Darwin puts him through a triathlon of traumatic moments that allow him to finally forget the kiss - only to be brutally reminded when Jojo prepares to leave.
17	17	"The Party"	Ben Bocquelet and Mic Graves	Aurelie Charbonnier and Rob Latimer	August 8, 2011	GB102	1.85	107A
Gumball and his friends are invited to a high-school party hosted by Tobias's sister Rachel, but they must find dates in order to attend; he asks Tina to the party, much to Penny's dismay, while Darwin joins him, ending up bonding with Rachel and helping clean up her house after the party.
18	18	"The Refund"	Ben Bocquelet, Jon Foster, and James Lamont	Ben Marsaud	August 15, 2011	GB126	2.10	107B
Gumball and Darwin discover their recently bought video game is defective and return to the store to get a refund; their attempts to get Larry to accept giving them the refund end in failure, and they decide to enlist their father's help, but when Richard steals from the cash register, the manager appears and attacks him. Gumball negotiates with the manager to relent, and he offers them a new console to play the game; upon setting it up, they discover it to actually be a shredder. Song: Refund the World
19	19	"The Robot"	Ben Bocquelet, Jon Foster, and James Lamont	Ben Marsaud	August 22, 2011	GB114	2.06	108A
Gumball decides to help Bobert act like a real boy. However, it soon becomes a battle for his very identity when the robot slowly begins to replace and starts plotting to take over his life.
20	20	"The Picnic"	Ben Bocquelet, James Lamont, and Mic Graves	Amandine Pécharman and Phillip Warner	August 29, 2011	GB105	1.91	108B
During a school field trip, Gumball and Darwin ignore their teacher's warning to go around a dangerous forest and, instead, traverse through it. Hopelessly lost, they must use what very little survival skills they have to escape.
21	21	"The Goons"	Ben Bocquelet, Jon Foster, James Lamont, and Mic Graves	Aurelie Charbonnier	September 5, 2011	GB127	2.72	109A
Anais tries to "dumb down" in order to have fun with her brothers and father. Gumball, feeling left out, sets up a race in order to win his father back. Song: The Dumb Song.
22	22	"The Secret"	Ben Bocquelet, Jon Foster, and James Lamont	George Gendi	September 26, 2011	GB128	2.05	109B
After being locked in the bathroom, Darwin prepares to tell Gumball a terrible secret, but they are freed by Rocky before he could explain; left annoyed at Darwin for passing off the secret, Gumball begins to pressure Darwin into telling him, but he fails. After locking them in the bathroom again, Gumball learns that the secret was about Darwin's reaction to a sandwich; after escaping through the sewers, Darwin and Anais reveal the true secret - they accidentally posted an embarrassing video of Gumball, making him an internet laughingstock.
23	23	"The Sock"	Ben Bocquelet, Jon Foster, James Lamont, and Sam Ward	Chuck Klein and Rob Latimer	October 3, 2011	GB129	2.00	110A
Mr. Small teaches Gumball and Darwin various but confusing ways of becoming more honest. Song: The Honesty Rap.
24	24	"The Genius"	Ben Bocquelet, Jon Foster, James Lamont, and Mic Graves	Jacques Gauthier and Rob Latimer	October 10, 2011	GB103	1.80	110B
With Darwin taken to an institute for geniuses, Gumball tries to become smart (with help from his brain) in order to join him. Meanwhile, Nicole and Richard cope with the possibility of never seeing Darwin again by bringing in Rocky, the school janitor, to replace him as Darwin. Song: You Gotta Think Big.
25	25	"The Poltergeist"	Ben Bocquelet, Jon Foster, James Lamont, Mic Graves, and Sam Ward	Aurelie Charbonnier, Dave Needham, and Tom Parkinson	October 17, 2011	GB132	2.11	113B
Richard believes that the house is haunted, but Gumball and Darwin discover it to actually be a depressed Mr. Robinson, who was kicked out by his wife.
26	26	"The Mustache"	Ben Bocquelet and Mic Graves	Ben Marsaud	November 21, 2011	GB130	2.08	111A
Gumball and Darwin develop a strange growth spurt and experience the highs and lows of being adults.
27	27	"The Date"	Ben Bocquelet, Jon Foster, and James Lamont	Ben Marsaud	November 28, 2011	GB117	2.20	111B
Gumball learns how to date so he can go out on a date with Penny. It later turns out, however, that he is going to a pet funeral for Penny's pet spider, Mr. Cuddles. Song: Danny Boy
28	28	"The Club"	Ben Bocquelet, Jon Foster, James Lamont, and Mic Graves	Rob Latimer and Ben Marsaud	December 5, 2011	GB122	2.18	112A
When Gumball turns down an offer to join the Rejects Club, they seek to enact revenge against him.
29	29	"The Wand"	Ben Bocquelet, Jon Foster, James Lamont, and Mic Graves	George Gendi and Phillip Warner	January 24, 2012	GB125	1.83	112B
After Richard finds a toy magic wand in his cereal box, Gumball and Darwin help him believe in magic again; however, Richard's belief in the wand sends him on a power trip, and the boys are forced to reveal the truth to their father.
30	30	"The Ape"	Ben Bocquelet, Jon Foster, James Lamont, and Mic Graves	Chuck Klein and Rob Latimer	January 31, 2012	GB131	1.79	113A
Miss Simian cozies up to Gumball and his family in order to win a Favorite Teacher award.
31	31	"The Car"	Ben Bocquelet, Jon Foster, James Lamont, and Mic Graves	Ben Marsaud	February 7, 2012	GB101	1.68	115A
Gumball and Darwin are eager enough to do numerous chores at Mr. Robinson's house, until they accidentally destroy his car.
32	32	"The Curse"	Ben Bocquelet, Jon Foster, James Lamont, and Mic Graves	Rob Latimer and George Gendi	February 14, 2012	GB116	1.91	115B
Gumball's good day turns from bad to worse throughout his school day, much to the point where he believes he is cursed. Songs: Today's Gonna Be A Wonderful Day!, When Life Hands You Lemons.
33	33	"The Microwave"	Ben Bocquelet, Jon Foster, and James Lamont	Ben Marsaud	February 21, 2012	GB133	1.85	116A
Gumball takes every gross thing he can find and creates a creature with a cannibalistic appetite, where he and Darwin are forced to stop the monster they created when it eats their family.
34	34	"The Meddler"	Ben Bocquelet, Jon Foster, and James Lamont	Ben Marsaud	February 28, 2012	GB134	1.69	116B
Seeing Gumball in need of attention, Nicole hangs out with him at school, which becomes increasingly embarrassing for her son.
35	35	"The Helmet"	Ben Bocquelet, Jon Foster, James Lamont, and Tommy Panays	Ben Marsaud	March 6, 2012	GB136	1.96	117A
The family starts to fall apart after they all think Gumball's luck-giving tinfoil helmet actually works.
36	36	"The Fight"	Ben Bocquelet, Jon Foster, James Lamont, and Mic Graves	Michael Gendi, Jacques Ganthier, and Darren Vandenburg	March 13, 2012	GB104	2.10	117B
Anais, believing Gumball is being bullied by Tina, accidentally sets up a fight with them. Gumball tries getting advice to avoid and even face Tina, but it all ends up useless as Tina appears and Gumball runs away; as Nicole tries to speak with Tina's father, Gumball and Tina find common ground and become friends.

== DVD releases ==
Volume 1: The DVD (Season 1 Volume 1)
Set details	Special features	
12 episodes (Episodes: "The DVD" • "The Third" • "The End" • "The Quest" • "The Laziest" • "The Gi" • "The Refund" • "The Picnic" • "The Mustache" • "The Wand" • "The Curse" • "The Meddler"); 1-disc DVD set; 1.78:1 aspect ratio; Languages: English (Dolby Stereo); Subtitles: English SDH	Character gallery	
DVD release dates
Region 1	Region 2	Region 4
August 28, 2012; October 7, 2014 (reissue)	N/A	October 9, 2015 (complete season) (currently unavailable)

Volume 2: The Mystery (Season 1 Volume 2)
Set details	Special features	
12 episodes (Episodes: "The Responsible" • "The Dress" • "The Spoon" • "The Pressure" • "The Mystery" • "The Sock" • "The Genius" • "The Club" • "The Ape" • "The Car" • "The Microwave" • "The Helmet"); 1-disc DVD set; 1.78:1 aspect ratio; Languages: English (Dolby Stereo); Subtitles: English SDH	Character gallery	
DVD release dates
Region 1	Region 2	Region 4
January 15, 2013	N/A	October 9, 2015 (complete season) (currently unavailable)

Volume 3: The Party (Season 1 Volume 3)
Set details	Special features	
12 episodes (Episodes: "The Debt" • "The Painting" • "The Ghost" • "The Prank" • "The Kiss" • "The Party" • "The Robot" • "The Goons" • "The Secret" • "The Poltergeist" • "The Date" • "The Fight"); 1-disc DVD set; 1.78:1 aspect ratio; Languages: English (Dolby Stereo); Subtitles: English SDH	Character gallery	
DVD release dates
Region 1	Region 2	Region 4
August 13, 2013	N/A	October 9, 2015 (complete season) (currently unavailable)
