= The Adventures of Paddington (2019 TV series) =

French-British animated television series

- Genre: Comedy; Children
- Based on: Paddington Bear by Michael Bond
- Developed by: Jon Foster; James Lamont
- Directed by: Chris Drew; Adam Shaw (season 1); Jez Hall (seasons 2–3)
- Creative director: Adam Shaw (seasons 2–3)
- Voices of: Ben Whishaw; Morwenna Banks (seasons 1–2); Teresa Gallagher (season 3); Darren Boyd; Bobby Beynon; Sabrina Newton-Fisher (season 1); Angeli Wall (seasons 2–3); Phyllis Logan
- Theme music composer: Gary Barlow
- Opening theme: "Paddington Bear"
- Ending theme: "Paddington Bear" (instrumental)
- Composer: Amine Bouhafa
- Countries of origin: France; United Kingdom
- Original language: English
- No. of seasons: 3
- No. of episodes: 117 (list of episodes)

Production
- Executive producers: David Heyman; Rosie Alison; Ron Halpern; Didier Lupfer; Jon Foster (seasons 2–3); James Lamont (seasons 2–3)
- Producers: Karen Davidsen; Simon Quinn
- Editor: Mary McKeogh
- Running time: 22 minutes
- Production companies: Heyday Films; StudioCanal; Blue Zoo Animation Studio; Superprod Studio

Original release
- Network: Gulli (France); M6 (France); Piwi+ (France); Nick Jr. (United Kingdom); Channel 5 (United Kingdom); Nickelodeon (International)
- Release: December 20, 2019 – February 21, 2025

Related
- Paddington; Paddington Bear; The Adventures of Paddington Bear

The Adventures of Paddington is an animated children's television series developed by Jon Foster and James Lamont that aired from 20 December 2019 to 21 February 2025. It was based on the Paddington Bear stories written by Michael Bond. The series was co-produced by Heyday Films and StudioCanal, with the participation of Nickelodeon, M6 and Piwi+. The animation for the series was produced by Blue-Zoo Animation Studio and Superprod Studio. The series airs on Nickelodeon internationally, except in France where the series airs on Gulli and later on M6 and Piwi+.

== Premise ==
The show centres on a younger Paddington as he writes letters to his Aunt Lucy celebrating the new things he has discovered throughout the day.

== Episodes ==
Season	Segments	Episodes	Originally released	
Season	Segments	Episodes	First released	Last released
1	53	41	December 20, 2019	December 18, 2020
2	53	50	February 19, 2021	October 1, 2022
3	48	34	April 3, 2023	February 21, 2025

== Characters ==
- Paddington Bear (voiced by Ben Whishaw, reprising his role from the films) is a young, kind, and polite Peruvian bear who moved to London after an earthquake destroyed his home and killed his uncle. He lives with the Brown family—Henry, Mary, Judy, and Jonathan—and next door to Mr. Curry. He is liked by everyone except Mr. Curry.
- Henry Brown (voiced by Darren Boyd) is the husband of Mary and the father of Judy and Jonathan.
- Mary Brown (voiced by Morwenna Banks in the first 2 seasons and Teresa Gallagher in season 3) is the wife of Henry and the mother of Judy and Jonathan.
- Mrs. Bird (voiced by Phyllis Logan) is the Browns housekeeper who lives with the family. She is very wise and looks after the house, doing all the cooking and cleaning. She also speaks with a Scottish accent.
- Jonathan Brown (voiced by Bobby Beynon) is the son of Henry and Mary and younger brother of Judy.
- Judith "Judy" Brown (voiced by Sabrina Newton-Fisher in season 1 and Angeli Wall in season 2) is the daughter of Henry and Mary and older sister of Jonathan.
- Mr. Reginald Curry (voiced by Reece Shearsmith) is the Browns grouchy next-door neighbour. Mr. Curry often seeks to get something for nothing. He frequently addresses Paddington as "Bear!".
- Mr. Samuel Gruber (voiced by David Schofield) is a benevolent shopkeeper and Paddington's best friend. He is Jewish.
- Aunt Lucy is a female bear that lives in Darkest Peru, she is Paddington's aunt and the series centers on his letters to her explaining his adventures in London. She appears in season 3 for the last few episodes. Aunt Lucy moved to the Home for Retired Bears after an earthquake destroyed their home and killed her husband.
- Ms. Pots (voiced by Liz Sutherland) is a local Windsor Gardens resident who runs the local town groups, provides music lessons, and is friends with the Brown family.
- Sofia (voiced by Monica Lopera) runs the local cafe, and is the mother of Mateo.
- Mateo (voiced by Jeremiah Waysome) is Sofia's son and friends with the Brown children.
- Toq Kamali (voiced by Divi Mittal) is the Brown's neighbour who is introduced in season 2 and is friends with the Brown children.
- Baz (voiced by Guz Khan in season 2 and Tez Ilyas in season 3) owns the local farm and is one of Paddington's friends.
- Simi (voiced by Samara Sutariya) is Baz's niece, is one of Paddington's friends and is introduced in season 2.
- Dr. Yasmine Kamali (voiced by Maya Sondhi) is Paddington's neighbour who is introduced in season 2 and is Toq's mother.

== Production ==
The Adventures of Paddington was first announced on February 14, 2019 as part of Nickelodeon's 2019 upfront under the working title Paddington, and the series' release date was later announced on 20 November 2019 with a new title, The Adventures of Paddington. Ben Whishaw reprises his role as Paddington Bear from the two Paddington films. Gary Barlow composed, wrote, and performed the theme song for the series.

On February 17, 2021, Nickelodeon announced that the second season would premiere on February 19, 2021.

In July 2021, StudioCanal announced that a third and final season was in development. On October 19, 2022, the third and final season was officially announced, and premiered on April 3, 2023. After all the season three episodes, the series was finished on February 21, 2025.

== Broadcast ==
The Adventures of Paddington premiered on Nickelodeon in the United States on 20 January 2020. A sneak-peek premiere of the first episode aired on 20 December 2019. In the United Kingdom, the series was premiered on Nick Jr. on 2 March 2020 and it first aired on Channel 5's Milkshake! block on 5 October.

== Awards ==
The series won at the 2021 Daytime Emmys for Outstanding Pre-School Children's Animated Series.
