= The Amazing World of Gumball season 5 =

The Amazing World of Gumball
- Season 5
- Cover art for digital download for the second half
- Showrunner: Ben Bocquelet
- No. of episodes: 40

Release
- Original network: Cartoon Network
- Original release: September 1, 2016 – November 10, 2017

Season chronology
- ← Previous; Season 4 Next → Season 6

The fifth season of the British-American animated television sitcom The Amazing World of Gumball, created by Ben Bocquelet, aired on Cartoon Network in the United States on September 1, 2016, and was produced by Cartoon Network Development Studio Europe. The series focuses on the misadventures of Gumball Watterson, a blue 12-year-old cat, along with his adopted brother, Darwin, a goldfish. Together, they cause mischief among their family, as well as with the wide array of students at Elmore Junior High, where they attend middle school.

== Development ==
=== Plot ===
The season focuses on the misadventures of Gumball Watterson, a blue 12-year-old cat, along with his adopted brother, Darwin, a goldfish. Together, they cause mischief among their family, as well as with the wide array of students at Elmore Junior High, where they attend middle school. In a behind-the-scenes video documenting the production of the second season, creator Ben Bocquelet expanded on the development of some of the characters, and how they are based on interactions from his childhood.

=== Production ===
On June 2, 2014, Cartoon Network announced that the series had been renewed for a fourth and fifth season. The two seasons combined were commissioned as 40 half-hour blocks, with 80 eleven minutes total. Production for the fifth season began on March 3, 2016, and concluded on May 12, 2017.

Mic Graves remained the series director, while Antoine Perez, a former assistant director, began serving as a partial director for certain episodes throughout the season.

==== Casting changes ====
The season is notable for a transition in the show's lead voice cast. In the episode "The Copycats", the characters Gumball and Darwin Watterson were officially recast due to their previous voice actors reaching puberty. Jacob Hopkins was replaced by Nicolas Cantu as Gumball, and Terrell Ransom Jr. was replaced by Donielle Hansley Jr. as Darwin. While "The Copycats" served as the narrative explanation for the change, the episode "The Ollie" had previously leaked on cable OnDemand platforms in December 2016, featuring the new cast in the end credits despite being released out of production order.

==== Viewership ====
The fifth season maintained a steady audience, averaging approximately 998,000 viewers per episode.

=== Crossovers ===
Characters from Clarence, Regular Show and Uncle Grandpa make cameo appearances in the episode, "The Boredom".

=== Miracle Star ===
Miracle Star (Chinese: 奇奇妙乐星; pinyin: Qí qímiào lè xīng; lit. 'The Weird', 'Wonderful', 'and Delightful Star') is a Chinese children's animated comedy series created by Chinese food company Sanyuan Foods to promote a brand of goat milk of the same name. The show is best known for plagiarizing The Amazing World of Gumball by imitating its scenes, character designs and animation style. Miracle Star is about an anthropomorphic goat named Miao Le Xing (referred to as Kiki) and his talking pet frog named Gua-Gua (referred to as Quack or Ribbit) who lives in an apartment with their parents.

The series aired from 2014 to 2017, with a total of 12 episodes broadcast before being cancelled due to negative reviews.

The 167th episode of The Amazing World of Gumball, "The Copycats", addresses the plagiarism.

== Episodes ==
No. overall	No. in season	Title	Directed by	Written by	Storyboarded by	Original air date	U.K. air date	Prod. code	US viewers (millions)
157	1	"The Rerun (Part 2)"	Mic Graves	Nathan Auerbach, Daniel Berg, Ben Bocquelet, Joe Parham, and Tobi Wilson	Adrian Maganza and Aurelie Charbonnier	September 5, 2016	November 5, 2016	GB501	1.19
As the episode continues when Gumball travels back to the events of the previous episode to prevent Rob from ruining his life, he finally gets revenge on Rob for framing him for the wrongdoings and causing yet another disaster at the mall, but Gumball saves Rob from the Void and reverses the events before he disappears forever.
158	2	"The Stories"	Antoine Perez	Ben Bocquelet, Andrew Jones, Ciaran Murtagh, Joe Parham, and Tobi Wilson	Aurelie Charbonnier	September 1, 2016	November 4, 2016	GB502	1.03
When everyone in school has had it with Molly's tedious stories, Gumball and Darwin have a plan to get her a new story she'll never forget.
159	3	"The Guy"	Mic Graves	Ben Bocquelet, Joe Markham, Joe Parham, John Sheerman, and Tobi Wilson	Wandrille Maunoury	September 8, 2016	November 3, 2016	GB504	1.21
Anais makes friends with an awkward kid named Josh, but Gumball and Darwin think there is something wrong with him.
160	4	"The Boredom"	Antoine Perez	Nathan Auerbach, Daniel Berg, Ben Bocquelet, Louise Coats, James Hamilton, James Huntrods, Joe Markham, Joe Parham, Jessica Ransom, and Tobi Wilson	Adrian Maganza	September 15, 2016	November 1, 2016	GB506	0.95
On a boring Saturday afternoon, Gumball and Darwin decide to find something interesting to do — only to either miss out or pass by all of the weird events happening around them.
161	5	"The Vision"	Antoine Perez	Ben Bocquelet, Joe Markham, Joe Parham, Jessica Ransom, John Sheerman, and Tobi Wilson	Wandrille Maunoury	October 6, 2016	November 5, 2016	GB511	1.09
Gumball accidentally takes Alan's gym bag and finds a flash drive containing a manifesto outlining Alan's House of Cards-esque rise to power through Elmore Junior High's student council. But when they believe that Alan is plotting to take over the world, Gumball and Darwin go to extreme measures to stop Alan before he succeeds with his "diabolical plan".
162	6	"The Choices"	Mic Graves	Nathan Auerbach, Daniel Berg, Ben Bocquelet, Jon Foster, James Lamont, Joe Parham, and Tobi Wilson	Adrian Maganza	October 13, 2016	November 7, 2016	GB503	1.15
During a disastrous dinner at home, Nicole flashes back to her childhood, where she first met Richard while trying to make it to a karate tournament, and wonders what life would be like if she never met him.
163	7	"The Code"	Mic Graves	Ben Bocquelet, Andrew Jones, Joe Markham, Ciaran Murtagh, Joe Parham, Jessica Ransom, John Sheerman, and Tobi Wilson	Cedric Guarneri	October 20, 2016	November 2, 2016	GB507	1.14
After the wifi goes down (and Richard confesses that their connection is from the Robinsons as the Wattersons' credit is so bad, they cannot afford to get the Internet for themselves), Gumball and Darwin try to live without Internet by making real-life equivalents of everything associated with the Internet (email, social media, gaming, leaving bad reviews for products and services). When that does not work, the Watterson kids decide to go into Mr. Robinson's account.
164	8	"The Test"	Antoine Perez	Nathan Auerbach, Daniel Berg, Ben Bocquelet, Joe Markham, Joe Parham, Jessica Ransom, John Sheerman, and Tobi Wilson	Aurelie Carbonnier, Oliver Hamilton, and Adrian Maganza	November 3, 2016	November 9, 2016	GB505	1.20
Gumball takes an online test and is labeled a "loser", so he decides to keep in all of his sarcastic remarks...which makes Gumball sick and turns his reality into an overly-clichéd family sitcom starring Tobias.
165	9	"The Slide"	Mic Graves	Ben Bocquelet, James Hamilton, James Huntrods, Joe Parham, and Tobi Wilson	Richard Méril	November 10, 2016	May 3, 2017	GB508	1.07
After locking eyes with the girl of his dreams at the mall, Rocky gets help from Gumball and Darwin to find her on a new dating app.
166	10	"The Loophole"	Antoine Perez	Ben Bocquelet, James Hamilton, James Huntrods, Joe Markham, Joe Parham, and Tobi Wilson	Richard Méril	November 17, 2016	February 5, 2017	GB512	1.10
Gumball and Darwin try to teach Bobert to help people, but he keeps taking things literally. When they tell him to protect life at all cost and to stop any potential dangers, he decides to eradicate all life on Earth.
167	11	"The Copycats"	Mic Graves	Ben Bocquelet, James Hamilton, James Huntrods, Joe Markham, and Tobi Wilson	Oliver Hamilton	February 6, 2017	May 9, 2017	GB517	1.01
The Wattersons square off against a Chinese family said to be knock-offs of them by challenging them to a series of bizarre and dangerous stunts.
168	12	"The Potato"	Mic Graves	Mic Graves, Andrew Jones, Joe Markham, Ciaran Murtagh, Jessica Ransom, and Tobi Wilson	Yani Ouabdesselam	February 7, 2017	May 3, 2017	GB519	0.96
Darwin quits eating potatoes after fearing he may have offended Idaho by eating them in front of him.
169	13	"The Fuss"	Antoine Perez	Ben Bocquelet, James Hamilton, James Huntrods, Joe Markham, Joe Parham, and Tobi Wilson	Oliver Hamilton	February 8, 2017	May 1, 2017	GB513	0.91
Nicole is mad at the family for forgetting her special day, and Richard sets out to get a tattoo so he does not forget.
170	14	"The Outside"	Mic Graves	Ben Bocquelet, Mic Graves, James Hamilton, James Huntrods, Joe Markham, Jessica Ransom, and Tobi Wilson	Wandrille Maunoury	February 9, 2017	May 8, 2017	GB518	1.07
When the family visits Richard's estranged dad, Frankie, who lives in a trailer in the town dump, they assume that he has done time in prison based on his extended absence from Richard's life and try to make him feel more at home by turning their home into a jailhouse. Guest star: Rich Fulcher as Frankie Watterson
171	15	"The Vase"	Mic Graves	Ben Bocquelet, Mic Graves, James Hamilton, James Huntrods, Joe Markham, Joe Parham, Jessica Ransom, and Tobi Wilson	Richard Méril	February 13, 2017	May 2, 2017	GB515	1.08
Sick of Granny Jojo's ugly gifts, Nicole encourages the kids to take matters into their own hands and unintentionally break her latest hideous vase, but it backfires when it is completely indestructible. Upon learning that Granny Jojo gave the wrong vase to her, Nicole must prevent the kids from destroying it at a junkyard.
172	16	"The Matchmaker"	Antoine Perez	Ben Bocquelet, Mic Graves, James Hamilton, Andrew Jones, Joe Markham, Ciaran Murtagh, Joe Parham, and Tobi Wilson	Oliver Hamilton	February 14, 2017	March 2, 2017	GB522	1.03
Gumball thinks Darwin is lovesick for Teri, and enlist Carrie the ghost (who has had a crush on Darwin since "The Scam") to help Darwin fall for Teri.
173	17	"The Box"	Mic Graves	Ben Bocquelet, Mic Graves, James Hamilton, Brydie Lee-Kennedy, Joe Markham, Joe Parham, and Tobi Wilson	Wandrille Maunoury	February 15, 2017	September 4, 2017	GB521	1.01
The Wattersons receive an unmarked package in the mail and drive themselves crazy figuring out what could be inside.
174	18	"The Console"	Antoine Perez	Nathan Auerbach, Daniel Berg, Ben Bocquelet, Joe Markham, Joe Parham, and Tobi Wilson	Aurelie Charbonnier and Adrian Maganza	February 16, 2017	May 5, 2017	GB510	0.97
When Gumball is given a cursed video game console, Elmore turns into a fantasy RPG video game. Gumball, Darwin, and Anais must save the town by going back to reality before it's too late.
175	19	"The Ollie"	Antoine Perez and Simon Landrein	Ben Bocquelet, James Hamilton, James Huntrods, Simon Landrein, Joe Markham, Timothy Mills, Joe Parham, and Tobi Wilson	Yani Ouabdesselam	February 20, 2017	May 11, 2017	GB516	1.30
Gumball teaches Darwin everything he knows about the world of skateboarding -- which, in this case, is a bunch of lies and exaggeration.
176	20	"The Catfish"	Antoine Perez	Ben Bocquelet, James Hamilton, James Huntrods, Joe Markham, Joe Parham, Jessica Ransom, and Tobi Wilson	Richard Méril	February 21, 2017	May 10, 2017	GB520	1.14
Gumball and Darwin realize Grandpa Louie has no friends, so they create one called Muriel (using the picture of a woman) for him, but when Granny Jojo finds out Louie has been spending time online with another "woman", Muriel not existing will not stop her from being destroyed.
177	21	"The Cycle"	Antoine Perez	Ben Bocquelet, James Hamilton, Andrew Jones, Ciaran Murtagh, Joe Parham, Jessica Ransom, and Tobi Wilson	Yani Ouabdesselam	February 22, 2017	May 11, 2017	GB523	1.14
Gumball, Darwin, and Anais help Richard get his revenge on Tobias' father, Harold, who has been bullying him since he set him up to be prom king in high school.
178	22	"The Stars"	Mic Graves	Ben Bocquelet, Mic Graves, Andrew Jones, Joe Markham, Ciaran Murtagh, Joe Parham, and Tobi Wilson	Richard Méril	February 23, 2017	September 4, 2017	GB524	0.92
When Richard gives Larry the hairdresser a bad review for saying he's bald, he gets offered a free haircut. This inspires Gumball and Darwin to go on a reviewing spree and target wherever Larry works (which is practically all over Elmore), forcing him to give them things with the threat of a bad review -- and everyone else to become paranoid of saying or doing anything in fear of getting zero stars.
179	23	"The Grades"	Antoine Perez	Ben Bocquelet, James Hamilton, Andrew Jones, Ciaran Murtagh, Joe Parham, and Tobi Wilson	Wandrille Maunoury	February 27, 2017	April 22, 2017	GB525	0.85
Miss Simian discovers a failed test from Gumball's past that brings down his grade point average and forces Gumball to go back to kindergarten. However, with Gumball demoted, Miss Simian has put herself in danger of being fired for not having enough students, so she must make Gumball pass his latest exam by any means necessary.
180	24	"The Diet"	Mic Graves	Ben Bocquelet, Mic Graves, James Hamilton, James Huntrods, Joe Markham, Joe Parham, Jessica Ransom, and Tobi Wilson	Bianca Ansems and Adrian Maganza	February 28, 2017	April 13, 2017	GB526	0.83
Gumball and Darwin help Richard lose weight, but his new, buff persona becomes a pain for everyone around him.
181	25	"The Ex"	Mic Graves	Ben Bocquelet, Mic Graves, James Hamilton, Joe Markham, Tom Neenan, Joe Parham, Jon Purkis, and Tobi Wilson	Oliver Hamilton	March 1, 2017	May 1, 2017	GB527	0.96
When Gumball learns that his nemesis, Rob (formerly known as Dr. Wrecker), has found a new nemesis, Banana Joe, Gumball must break Rob and Banana Joe's enemy-ship by making him come back to be his nemesis again, much to the frustration of Penny, who has grown sick of Gumball telling her stories about his encounters with Rob.
182	26	"The Sorcerer"	Antoine Perez	Jack Bernhardt, Ben Bocquelet, Joe Markham, Joe Parham, and Tobi Wilson	Wandrille Maunoury	March 2, 2017	May 4, 2017	GB528	1.16
Gumball refuses to accept he is the only kid at school with no special powers and convinces Mrs. Jötunheim, Hector's mom, to take him on as her apprentice -- and ends up unleashing a giant, literal Internet troll on Elmore.
183	27	"The Menu"	Mic Graves	Ben Bocquelet, James Hamilton, James Huntrods, and Tobi Wilson	Wandrille Maunoury	March 6, 2017	September 20, 2017	GB529	0.98
The prize jewel on the secret Joyful Burger menu is a mysterious burger, but to order it, a customer needs to know its name. When Larry refuses to tell the Wattersons what it is called, Richard, Gumball and Darwin go to super-sized lengths to find out.
184	28	"The Uncle"	Antoine Perez	Jack Bernhardt, Ben Bocquelet, Mic Graves, James Hamilton, James Huntrods, Joe Markham, and Tobi Wilson	Oliver Hamilton	March 7, 2017	May 10, 2017	GB531	0.80
Gumball tries to become Ocho's friend after he believes that his uncle is the same Mario from the Super Mario Bros. video game series. Song: Goodbye
185	29	"The Weirdo"	Antoine Perez	Ben Bocquelet, Mic Graves, James Hamilton, Andrew Jones, Joe Markham, Ciaran Murtagh, Joe Parham, Jessica Ransom, and Tobi Wilson	Richard Méril	March 8, 2017	May 14, 2017	GB514	0.87
Gumball and Darwin try to help Sussie be less of a weirdo after seeing her get bullied...until they learn what it is like to be her by putting on her plastic, googly eyes.. Songs: Hey There Sussie, I Am Free
186	30	"The Heist"	Mic Graves	Ben Bocquelet, Mic Graves, James Hamilton, Joe Markham, Tom Neenan, Jon Purkis, and Tobi Wilson	Richard Méril	March 9, 2017	May 26, 2017	GB532	0.97
A mishap with a motorcycle helmet leads Richard with $2 million from the Elmore Bank. With the police (incompetently) trying to find the robber, the Wattersons squabble over whether the money should be returned (and have all of them face a life sentence for accidental bank robbery) or if they should spend it (as they sorely need the money).
187	31	"The Singing"	Antoine Perez	Ben Bocquelet, Mic Graves, James Hamilton, Joe Markham, Tom Neenan, Jon Purkis, and Tobi Wilson	Bianca Ansems, Oliver Hamilton, and Adrian Maganza	September 1, 2017	April 20, 2018	GB540	0.92
The people of Elmore enjoy a day of singing, while Nicole throws out the showerhead that started the singing in the first place.
188	32	"The Best"	Antoine Perez	Ben Bocquelet, James Hamilton, James Huntrods, Joe Markham, Joe Parham, Jessica Ransom, and Tobi Wilson	Kenneth Ladekjaer	September 8, 2017	October 25, 2017	GB536	0.78
Carmen continuously annoys Gumball by criticizing his standards. After trying and failing to get back at her, he discovers her past as a troublemaking student at Franklin Jr. High and tries to upload a news clip of her arrest/expulsion onto Elmore Stream-It.
189	33	"The Worst"	Mic Graves	Ben Bocquelet, James Hamilton, Joe Markham, Tom Neenan, Jon Purkis, Jessica Ransom, and Tobi Wilson	Oliver Hamilton and Wandrille Maunoury	September 15, 2017	October 25, 2017	GB539	0.88
The Wattersons come home angry, believing they have the worst day due to age and sex discrimination, so they decide to swap sexes and age in order to find out who has it tougher: men, women, adults, or children.
190	34	"The Deal"	Mic Graves	Ben Bocquelet, Mic Graves, James Hamilton, Bec Hill, Joe Markham, Jessica Ransom, and Jonny Leigh-Wright	Chloé Nicolay	September 22, 2017	April 6, 2018	GB530	0.81
When Nicole finally gets a raise and becomes the employee of the month, Richard feels getting worst as he does not get appreciated for being a stay-at-home father. But when he shows Nicole what he does to get the kids fed, cleaned, and ready for school and Nicole calls him out for it, Richard goes on strike and the house goes to pot when the children become and turn into a trio of Gremlins-esque demons.
191	35	"The Petals"	Mic Graves	Ben Bocquelet, James Hamilton, James Huntrods, Joe Markham, Jessica Ransom, and Tobi Wilson	Kenneth Ladekjaer	September 29, 2017	October 24, 2017	GB533	0.87
When Leslie begins wilting, Gumball and Darwin do what they can to help their floral pal look beautiful – and Leslie ends up running scared when Gumball reveals a grisly solution to Leslie's wilting problem.
192	36	"The Puppets"	Mic Graves, Joseph Pelling, and Becky Sloan	Ben Bocquelet, Louise Coats, James Hamilton, Tom Neenan, Joseph Pelling, Jon Purkis, Becky Sloan, and Tobi Wilson	Adrian Maganza	October 6, 2017	April 27, 2018	GB537	0.86
While searching for old things to sell at their mother's garage sale, Darwin finds a box of puppets that Gumball wants thrown out, but Darwin, not wanting to let go of his favorite childhood toys, begins playing with them... and the duo end up in a bizarre puppet land where their childhood toys want to play with them forever.
193	37	"The Nuisance"	Mic Graves	Jack Bernhardt, Ben Bocquelet, James Hamilton, Joe Markham, Jessica Ransom, and Tobi Wilson	Chloé Nicolay	October 13, 2017	October 23, 2017	GB534	0.91
The Wattersons fear the worst when their mayor (formerly a real estate mogul) offers them the chance to be model citizens to avoid being thrown out of Elmore... and when The Wattersons turn human (with Darwin as their pet dog) and the mayor reveals that he is gentrifying the neighborhood so only rich people will live there, The Wattersons do what they can to make Elmore unattractive to potential buyers. This episode first aired in Italy on October 10, 2017.
194	38	"The Line"	Mic Graves	Mic Graves, James Hamilton, James Huntrods, Brydie Lee-Kennedy, Joe Markham, Jessica Ransom, and Tobi Wilson	Chloé Nicolay	October 20, 2017	April 13, 2018	GB538	0.88
The Wattersons and all of Elmore do whatever it takes to be the first ones at the new screening of the Star Wars-esque sci-fi space drama, Stellar Odyssey Colon: The Force Rehashed. This episode first aired in Italy on October 17, 2017.
195	39	"The List"	Antoine Perez	Ben Bocquelet, James Hamilton, Brydie Lee-Kennedy, Joe Markham, Joe Parham, Jessica Ransom, and Tobi Wilson	Richard Méril	November 3, 2017	March 30, 2018	GB535	0.99
When Gumball and Darwin discover that Nicole had to give up her life goals to be a wife and mother, the duo decide to help her out by doing her chores... and end up taking the goal list she made when she was sixteen years old. This episode first aired in Italy on October 13 and in Spain on October 26, 2017.
196	40	"The News"	Antoine Perez	Nathan Auerbach, Daniel Berg, Ben Bocquelet, Joe Parham, and Tobi Wilson	Oliver Hamilton	November 10, 2017	September 15, 2017	GB509	0.91
Join desk anchor Kip Schlezinger and his field reporter, Mike (the microphone-headed reporter first seen on "The Oracle"), as they cover all of Elmore's goings-on on the Channel 6 News, from a robbery at Joyful Burger to Daisy the Donkey's on-air meltdown during a show taping.
