= The Choices =

- The Amazing World of Gumball episode
- Episode no.: Season 5 Episode 6
- Directed by: Mic Graves
- Written by: Nathan Auerbach; Daniel Berg; Ben Bocquelet; Jon Foster; James Lamont; Joe Parham; Tobi Wilson
- Story by: Ben Bocquelet
- Production code: GB503
- Original air date: October 13, 2016

Episode chronology
| ← Previous "The Vision" | Next → "The Code" |

"The Choices" is the sixth episode of the fifth season of the British-American animated sitcom The Amazing World of Gumball. It originally aired on Cartoon Network in the United States on October 13, 2016. It was directed by Mic Graves and written by series creator Ben Bocquelet, Nathan Auerbach, Daniel Berg, Jon Foster, James Lamont, Joe Parham, and Tobi Wilson.

In the episode, Nicole reminisces about her childhood and her first meeting with Richard during a kitchen fire, leading her to contemplate how her life might have turned out through a series of alternative timelines. The episode received critical acclaim and won awards, including a British Academy Children's Award in 2017 and a British Animation Award in 2018.

== Plot ==
During a family dinner where the kitchen catches fire, Nicole struggles to maintain her composure. Before reacting, she reflects on the day she first met her husband, Richard.

Her memory shifts back to her childhood, where she faced strict expectations to succeed from her parents. When their car breaks down on the way to a karate tournament, Nicole runs to the venue. While running through a park, she imagines several alternative timelines based on different paths she could have chosen. These scenarios include achieving political power as a solitary world leader, marrying secondary characters like Banana Bob or Harold, and dying early due to the eccentricities of Mr. Small or Sal Left Thumb.

Nicole concludes that the alternative paths lead to unfulfillment. Her memory returns to the actual timeline, where she stops to assist a young Richard, who is trapped inside a log. Richard comforts her and encourages her to look past trophies and success.

A flashback montage chronicles their life together, including their teenage years, Nicole breaking ties with her parents, moving into an apartment, their wedding, and the births of Gumball, Darwin, and Anais. In the present, Nicole's anger dissipates. Satisfied with her life choices, she defuses the tension in the kitchen by initiating a food fight with her family.

== Production ==
The flashback montage detailing Nicole and Richard's relationship is set to a piano score composed by Ben Locket and utilizes a "filmstrip" visual style.

== Reception ==
"The Choices" received critical acclaim upon its initial broadcast. Cassandra Morgan of Bubbleblabber rated the episode an 8.5 out of 10, praising its visual layout and the development added to the backstories of Nicole and Richard Watterson. Morgan noted that the central flashback sequence highlighted the characters' underlying affection, providing narrative stakes that contrasted with the series' typical domestic comedy style. In a retrospective ranking for Screen Rant, Shawn S. Lealos and Izak Bulten named "The Choices" the best episode of the series, praising its heartfelt depiction of Nicole and Richard's relationship and describing it as a poignant narrative that appeals to viewers across demographics.

=== Accolades ===
At the 2017 British Academy Children's Awards (BAFTA), the writing team received a nomination, and the series won the Animation category.

At the 2018 British Animation Awards (BAAs), Teresa Gallagher won Best Voice Performance for her portrayal of Nicole Watterson in "The Choices".

| Year | Award | Category | Nominee(s) | Result |
|---|---|---|---|---|
| 2017 | British Academy Children's Awards | Animation | The Amazing World of Gumball | Won |
| 2017 | British Academy Children's Awards | Writer | Writing Team | Nominated |
| 2018 | British Animation Awards | Best Voice Performance | Teresa Gallagher (for The Choices) | Won |
