= The DVD (The Amazing World of Gumball) =

- The Amazing World of Gumball episode
- Episode no.: Season 1 Episode 1
- Directed by: Mic Graves
- Written by: Ben Bocquelet; Jon Foster; James Lamont
- Production codes: GB120; 118B
- Original air date: May 3, 2011

"The DVD" is the series premiere of the British-American animated sitcom The Amazing World of Gumball, serving as the first episode of the first season. Directed by Mic Graves and written by series creator Ben Bocquelet, Jon Foster, and James Lamont, it originally aired on Cartoon Network in the United States on May 3, 2011, as a special sneak peek prior to the series' official launch on May 9, 2011.

The episode introduces the main characters of the Watterson household and establishes the series' signature aesthetic format of combining multiple animation styles with real-world photographic backgrounds. Upon its debut, the broadcast was watched by 2.12 million viewers.

== Plot ==
Nicole Watterson instructs her son Gumball to return a rented copy of the movie Alligators on a Train to the local Laser Video rental shop to avoid a late fee. Gumball agrees, but discovers his adoptive brother Darwin using the disc to slice a pizza. Attempting to clean off the pizza grease using the rough side of a kitchen sponge, Gumball heavily scratches the disc before accidentally dropping it into the active garbage disposal unit, destroying it completely.

To avoid Nicole's wrath, Gumball and Darwin attempt several desperate schemes to raise money for a replacement copy or trick the video store clerk, Larry. They first try to hand Larry a crude cardboard cut-out disc, which he immediately rejects. They then attempt begging on the street, but a local homeless man claims their earnings and subsequently wins the lottery. Next, they apply for a cosmetic testing trial, which ends abruptly when Gumball suffers a severe allergic reaction to an automated makeup application machine.

Realizing Nicole is onto their lies, the brothers run to Laser Video and present a homemade, live-action remake of the film recorded on a low-budget video camera. Larry rejects the fake film and demands the original disc, forcing the brothers to confess just as Nicole arrives. While Nicole pays the twenty-five-dollar replacement fee, Larry reveals that their cumulative late fees total seven hundred dollars. The episode concludes with the terrified Watterson family running away in a panicked freeze-frame.

== Production ==
"The DVD" was among the earliest The Amazing World of Gumball episodes produced after Turner Broadcasting System Europe officially greenlit the series for a 36-episode first season from its European development studio in March 2010. Series creator Ben Bocquelet based the narrative premise on childhood anxieties regarding personal responsibility, honesty, and accidental property destruction. Following strong viewership for early broadcasts, Cartoon Network renewed the show for subsequent seasons.

Animation production for the episode was executed by German studio Studio Soi. As the initial premiere episode produced for broadcast, "The DVD" served as the primary testing ground for the series' composite aesthetic pipeline, layering 2D vector character designs over photographic backgrounds and 3D computer-generated props.

== Reception ==
Upon its sneak-peek broadcast in the United States on May 3, 2011, "The DVD" earned a 0.4 rating in the 18–49 demographic and was viewed by an estimated 2.12 million viewers.

Critical reception for the episode and its inclusion on home media compilations was generally positive. Reviewing the initial DVD release for The A.V. Club, Noel Murray rated the collection a "B+", highlighting "The DVD" as an effective introduction to the show's grounded community dynamic amid its eccentric visuals. Tyler Foster of DVD Talk noted that while the animation pipeline was visually impressive, the moral narrative was fairly conventional for family television.
