= The Copycats =

- The Amazing World of Gumball episode
- Episode no.: Season 5 Episode 11
- Directed by: Mic Graves
- Written by: Ben Bocquelet; Tobi Wilson; James Hamilton; James Huntrods; Joe Markham
- Story by: Ben Bocquelet
- Production code: GB517
- Original air date: February 6, 2017

Episode chronology
← Previous "The Loophole"	Next → "The Potato"

"The Copycats" is the eleventh episode of the fifth season of the British-American animated sitcom The Amazing World of Gumball. Directed by Mic Graves and written by series creator Ben Bocquelet alongside Tobi Wilson, James Hamilton, James Huntrods, and Joe Markham, the episode premiered on Cartoon Network in the United States on February 6, 2017.

In the episode, the Wattersons discover a family of knock-off counterparts—the Chi Chi family—who mimic their every move. To force the imitators to stop, the Wattersons escalate a series of increasingly dangerous stunts, eventually pushing both families to their breaking points.

== Plot ==
External videos
- "The Copycats" (Official Clip) on YouTube

While grocery shopping, Gumball and Darwin encounter Chi Chi and Ribbit, two children who mimic their every word and action. The situation escalates when the rest of the Watterson family discovers their own doppelgängers. Gumball realizes that the copycats are the stars of a Chinese animated series, The Incredible World of Chi Chi, which is profiting by imitating the Wattersons' lives.

After a confrontation results in a stalemate, the Wattersons attempt to encourage the copycats to be original through a musical number, "Copycats", but the imitators simply perform a mirrored version of the song. Anais concludes that the copycats are physically and narratively bound to follow their lead. To force them to stop, the Wattersons engage in increasingly life-threatening stunts, betting that the copycats' lack of "plot armor" will eventually catch up to them.

The conflict culminates in a high-speed truck chase toward an unfinished bridge. While the Wattersons narrowly escape the resulting explosion thanks to Anais' quick thinking, the copycats—who lack an Anais counterpart—plunge into the gorge. The following day, all traces of the Chinese series have vanished. The episode ends on a meta-note: while celebrating their uniqueness, Gumball and Darwin "glitch" and suddenly speak with new voices, a reference to the real-life transition of the show's voice actors.

== Production ==
The episode was produced as a satirical response to Miracle Star, a Chinese animated commercial series produced to promote a goat milk brand, which had drawn widespread attention and criticism from animation outlets and fans for plagiarizing character designs, animation sequences, and storylines from The Amazing World of Gumball. Rather than relying solely on cease-and-desist letters, the production team responded by dedicating an entire episode to confronting the knockoff series, explicitly incorporating the plagiarized character designs into the show's universe as the "Chi Chi" family. The Miracle Star character designs were only incorporated in storyboards until their character designs were altered to prevent a lawsuit.

"The Copycats" also marked the final performance of Jacob Hopkins and Terrell Ransom Jr. as the voice actors for Gumball and Darwin Watterson, respectively. Due to their voices maturing as they aged, the characters were recast with Nicolas Cantu and Donielle T. Hansley Jr., a transition that was directly acknowledged and integrated into the episode's closing scene.

== Reception ==
"The Copycats" received widespread praise from television critics and fans for its meta-commentary on intellectual property theft and its direct response to the Miracle Star plagiarism controversy.

Writing for Polygon, Allegra Frank called the episode a "brilliant" takedown of plagiarism, praising Cartoon Network's decision to destroy the knockoffs within the show's own narrative structure rather than settling the issue quietly behind closed doors. Reviewing the episode for Matt A La Mode, Matt Edwards commended the premise and highlighted the "Copycats" musical sequence for its mirrored animation, calling the climactic truck chase one of the darkest and most effective action sequences in the series. In a retrospective ranking for Screen Rant, Shawn S. Lealos and Izak Bulten listed "The Copycats" among the 25 best episodes of the series, praising its meta commentary on media ripoffs and how seamlessly the episode explained the real-life transition of the lead voice actors. Additionally, Screen Rant's Robert Pitman cited the show's voice-recasting episodes as a prime example of how animated series can successfully transition lead roles by leaning into self-referential humor.

At the 2018 British Animation Awards, "The Copycats" won the Children's Choice Award.
