= The Amazing World of Gumball season 3 =

The Amazing World of Gumball
- Season 3
- Cover art for digital download for the second half
- Showrunner: Ben Bocquelet
- No. of episodes: 40

Release
- Original network: Cartoon Network
- Original release: June 5, 2014 – August 6, 2015

Season chronology
- ← Previous; Season 2 Next → Season 4

The third season of the British-American animated sitcom The Amazing World of Gumball, created by Ben Bocquelet, aired on Cartoon Network in the United States and was produced by Cartoon Network Development Studio Europe. The season has 40 episodes. The series focuses on the misadventures of Gumball Watterson, a blue 12-year-old cat, along with his adopted brother, Darwin, a goldfish. Together, they cause mischief among their family, as well as with the wide array of students at Elmore Junior High, where they attend middle school.

== Development ==
=== Plot ===
As in previous seasons, the episodes follow the misadventures of Gumball Watterson, a 12-year-old blue cat, and his adoptive brother Darwin, a goldfish, as they navigate school life, family dynamics, and surreal adventures in the town of Elmore. In a behind-the-scenes video documenting the production of the second season, creator Ben Bocquelet expanded on the development of some of the characters, and how they are based on interactions from his childhood.

=== Production ===
Production for the third season ran from December 5, 2013, to February 5, 2015. In October 2012, Cartoon Network announced that The Amazing World of Gumball had been renewed for a third season consisting of 40 episodes. Once again, each episode is directed by Mic Graves. The season marks the debut of series voice actors Jacob Hopkins and Terrell Ransom, Jr., who take over the roles of Gumball and Darwin from Logan Grove and Kwesi Boakye at the end of this first episode "The Kids", which also introduced Hopkins and Ransom.

== Broadcast ==
The season premiered on Cartoon Network in the United Kingdom and Ireland in September 2014. This season had 1.937 million viewers per episode in the United States.

== Episodes ==
No. overall	No. in season	Title	Written by	Storyboarded by	Original release date	Prod. code	US viewers (millions)	Streaming no.
77	1	"The Kids"	Ben Bocquelet, Guillaume Cassuto, Mic Graves, and Tobi Wilson	Aurelie Charbonnier, Andy Kelly and Akis Dimitrakopoulos	June 5, 2014	GB301	2.39	301A
Gumball's and Darwin's voices begin going haywire, which gets them in trouble with the citizens. After learning they are hitting puberty, the two become depressed that they might be growing up, so they try to cling to their childhood as tightly as possible. Note: This is the last episode in which Logan Grove and Kwesi Boakye voice Gumball and Darwin, and at the end of this first episode Jacob Hopkins and Terrell Ransom, Jr. represent their new voices as the two main characters. Guest Animation Provided By: CRCR
78	2	"The Fan"	Ben Bocquelet, Jess Ransom, Howard Read, Paul McKenna, and Tobi Wilson	Adrian Maganza	June 5, 2014	GB303	2.39	301B
Sarah the ice cream cone becomes Gumball and Darwin's obsessive number-one fan. Note: This is the first full episode with Jacob Hopkins and Terrell Ransom, Jr. as Gumball and Darwin after they represent their new voices at the end of this first episode "The Kids", replacing Logan Grove and Kwesi Boakye due to the latters' voices changing from puberty.
79	3	"The Coach"	Tim Allsop, Ben Bocquelet, Ben Cottam, Paul McKenna, Jess Ransom, Stewart Williams, and Tobi Wilson	Adrian Maganza and Akis Dimitrakopoulos	June 12, 2014	GB306	1.68	302A
Elmore Junior High's new gym coach stands up to Jamie, who vows to get her street cred back by attacking the coach.
80	4	"The Joy"	Ben Bocquelet, Ben Cottam, Jon Foster, Mic Graves, Kieran Hodgson, Tom Meltzer, Joe Parham, Jess Ransom, and Tobi Wilson	Andy Kelly and Wandrille Maunoury	June 19, 2014	GB305	1.86	302B
After being hugged by Richard one morning, Gumball and Darwin become mindlessly happy and end up spreading a zombie-like contagious joy virus across Elmore Junior High, which Miss Simian must put an end to.
81	5	"The Puppy"	Tim Allsop, Ben Bocquelet, Guillaume Cassuto, Mic Graves, Ben Cottam, and Stewart Williams	Aurelie Charbonnier	June 26, 2014	GB304	2.15	303B
Gumball, Darwin, and Anais' long-awaited pet turns out to be an aggressive turtle that hates them.
82	6	"The Recipe"	Ben Bocquelet, Guillaume Cassuto, Mic Graves, and Tobi Wilson	Aurelie Charbonnier	July 3, 2014	GB311	2.17	303A
Gumball and Darwin discover the secret behind their classmate Anton's immortality, but things go wrong when they end up producing multiple Anton clones, even an evil burnt one.
83	7	"The Name"	Tim Allsop, Ben Bocquelet, Mic Graves, Tom Meltzer, Joe Parham, and Stewart Williams	Chuck Klein	July 10, 2014	GB307	2.32	304A
When Gumball discovers his real name is Zach, he starts developing an evil alter-ego who takes over him and his memories. Darwin and his family must save Gumball and his memory by changing it back to his legal name "Gumball" before Zach takes over completely.
84	8	"The Extras"	Ben Bocquelet, Guillaume Cassuto, and Mic Graves	Adrian Maganza and Aurelie Charbonnier	July 17, 2014	GB312	1.93	304B
On a slow day for Gumball and Darwin, the background characters — some of which are from past episodes, like the crowd members from "The Sweaters" — decide to use the time to have their own adventures.
85	9	"The Gripes"	Tim Allsop, Ben Bocquelet, Guillaume Cassuto, Kieran Hodgson, Mic Graves, Stewart Williams, and Tobi Wilson	Adrian Maganza	July 24, 2014	GB308	2.21	305A
Gumball and Darwin's complaining goes too far when people mistake them for charity cases, and it is up to them to reveal the mix-up.
86	10	"The Vacation"	Guillaume Cassuto, Mic Graves, and Tobi Wilson	Andy Kelly and Wandrille Maunoury	July 31, 2014	GB310	1.90	305B
After Nicole tells her family a scary story on a camping trip, the events of the story begin to come true when their car breaks down on a desert road and they are taken in by an ugly old man who lives with his mother.
87	11	"The Fraud"	Ben Bocquelet, Guillaume Cassuto, Mic Graves, and Tobi Wilson	Adrian Maganza	August 7, 2014	GB316	1.91	306A
Gumball and Darwin discover that Principal Brown's diploma is a fake, and Brown goes to great lengths to prevent his secret from being exposed.
88	12	"The Void"	Ben Bocquelet, Guillaume Cassuto, Mic Graves, Paul Rice, and Tobi Wilson	Akis Dimitrakopoulos and Wandrille Maunoury	August 14, 2014	GB309	1.90	306B
Gumball, Darwin, and Mr. Small investigate the disappearance of Molly and soon find themselves sucked into the Void, a mysterious dimension containing all the mistakes the world has ever made.
89	13	"The Boss"	Ben Bocquelet, Guillaume Cassuto, Mic Graves, Joe Parham, and Tobi Wilson	Andy Kelly and Wandrille Maunoury	August 21, 2014	GB313	1.82	307A
When Mr. Robinson suffers a life-threatening accident, Gumball and Darwin help Mr. Robinson's son, Rocky, get a more respectable job to pay for the operation — but the effects of working a white-collar job turn Rocky into a soulless drone.
90	14	"The Move"	Ben Bocquelet, Guillaume Cassuto, Mic Graves, Joe Parham, and Tobi Wilson	Akis Dimitrakopoulos	August 28, 2014	GB317	1.88	307B
Gumball and Darwin attempt to cure Clayton of his compulsive lying, but their refusal to believe in his capability of performing a secret martial arts move leaves Tobias laying unconscious after he attempts to prove it.
91	15	"The Law"	Guillaume Cassuto, Mic Graves, Joe Parham, and Tobi Wilson	Aurelie Charbonnier and Wandrille Maunoury	September 4, 2014	GB314	2.15	308A
Doughnut Sheriff takes Gumball and Darwin along with him for the day in an attempt to show them how cool cops can be, but he ends up too excited and loses his job. When Felicity causes a breakdown in law, however, it is up to the three to stop her and save the day.
92	16	"The Allergy"	Ben Bocquelet, Guillaume Cassuto, Mic Graves, and Joe Parham	Adrian Maganza	September 11, 2014	GB318	1.91	308B
Darwin begins sneezing continuously whenever he witnesses unintelligent behavior, which leads the family to theorize that he must be now allergic to stupidity. They have to find a cure for Darwin before the latter's sneezes become explosive to the point where he'll end up sneezing Elmore off the map.
93	17	"The Mothers"	Ben Bocquelet, Guillaume Cassuto, Jon Foster, Mic Graves, James Lamont, Joe Parham, and Tobi Wilson	Andy Kelly and Wandrille Maunoury	September 18, 2014	GB315	N/A	309A
On Mother's Day, Tobias, Banana Joe, Gumball, and Darwin put their respective mothers, Jackie, Banana Barbara, and Nicole through a series of tests to determine who has the "World's Greatest Mom". However, when Nicole sends Gumball and Darwin to the car as punishment after realizing that she's been put through multiple tests by them, the duo attempt to make it up to her.
94	18	"The Password"	Ben Bocquelet, Guillaume Cassuto, Mic Graves, and Joe Parham	Andy Kelly	September 25, 2014	GB320	2.00	309B
Richard changes the password to the Watterson children's computer at Nicole's insistence, but after Gumball and Darwin decipher the password as "Anais" from the inputted hint "favorite child", they start sucking up to Richard in various ways, all of which end up unintentionally injuring him. When Richard gets fed up and sends the two to their room, they denounce him as only being their second favorite parent, and the situation escalates into Richard competing for the title of favorite parent with Nicole.
95	19	"The Procrastinators"	Ben Bocquelet, Guillaume Cassuto, Mic Graves, Joe Parham, and Tobi Wilson	Aurelie Charbonnier and Wandrille Maunoury	October 2, 2014	GB319	2.26	310A
Nicole tasks Gumball and Darwin with taking out the trash before 5:00 p.m., which they take great measures to avoid doing.
96	20	"The Shell"	Ben Bocquelet, Guillaume Cassuto, Howard Read, James Lamont, Jon Foster, Tobi Wilson, and Tom Crowley	Aurelie Charbonnier	October 9, 2014	GB302	2.31	310B
After accidentally headbutting her during a school play and causing a crack to form in her shell (which lands him in trouble with Penny's father), Gumball urges Penny to break from it and reveal her true form. However, when Gumball is left speechless by its appearance, Penny misinterprets his shock as disappointment and goes on a rampage through Elmore, shapeshifting into several monsters. Eventually, Gumball is able to confess his true feelings to Penny, alleviating her distress as they become a couple.
97	21	"The Burden"	Ben Bocquelet, Guillaume Cassuto, Mic Graves, Joe Parham, Jess Ransom, and Tobi Wilson	Adrian Maganza	October 16, 2014	GB321	2.36	311B
Gumball and Darwin are left in charge of Elmore Junior High's pet hamster, Chris Morris, over the weekend and come to appreciate its presence for different reasons, but when they discover that the "hamster" is a clump of hair from Principal Brown, the duo go to school to retrieve the real Chris Morris.
98	22	"The Bros"	Ben Bocquelet, Guillaume Cassuto, Joe Parham, Jess Ransom, Mic Graves, and Tobi Wilson	Aurelie Charbonnier	October 23, 2014	GB322	1.70	312A
Darwin becomes jealous of Gumball and Penny's new relationship and sets out to find information on Penny and intrude between the two in the hopes of breaking them up.
99	23	"The Mirror"	Ben Bocquelet, Guillaume Cassuto, Joe Parham, and Mic Graves	Akis Dimitrakopoulos and Wandrille Maunoury	October 30, 2014	GB323	1.61	311A
Gumball refuses to forward an e-mail purportedly sent by a ghost, against Darwin's advice. When a curse begins to take effect and their family is dragged into another dimension, Gumball and Darwin seek Carrie's help to save them and lift the curse.
100	24	"The Man"	Ben Bocquelet, Guillaume Cassuto, Joe Parham, and Tobi Wilson	Aurelie Charbonnier	October 30, 2014	GB326	1.40	312B
Richard is shocked to learn that his mother, Granny Jojo, is dating Louie the mouse and tries to break them up.
101	25	"The Pizza"	Ben Bocquelet, Guillaume Cassuto, Joe Parham, and Tobi Wilson	Adrian Maganza	November 13, 2014	GB325	1.55	313A
A frustrated Larry quits all his jobs thanks to the Wattersons' anger and stupidity making his jobs difficult, and things get worse when the town becomes a post-apocalyptic warzone and the townspeople turn savage.
102	26	"The Lie"	Ben Bocquelet, Guillaume Cassuto, Joe Parham, Jess Ransom, and Tobi Wilson	Adrian Maganza	November 20, 2014	GB328	1.66	313B
In the month of January, Gumball and Anais invent a new holiday called "Sluzzle Tag" to counter the January doldrums. Guest Star: Derek Jacobi as the narrator
103	27	"The Butterfly"	Ben Bocquelet, Guillaume Cassuto, Joe Parham, Jess Ransom, and Tobi Wilson	Aurelie Charbonnier	January 8, 2015	GB330	2.14	314A
Gumball inadvertently puts the butterfly effect into motion throughout Elmore when he releases a human-faced butterfly from a jar in Miss Simian's class.
104	28	"The Question"	Ben Bocquelet, Guillaume Cassuto, Tony Hull, Joe Parham, and Tobi Wilson	Andy Kelly and Wandrille Maunoury	January 8, 2015	GB329	2.14	314B
After going on a sugar rush, Gumball and Darwin experience oneness with the universe and try to find the answer to the meaning of life.
105	29	"The Saint"	Ben Bocquelet, Joe Parham, Jess Ransom, and Tobi Wilson	Ben Marsaud	January 15, 2015	GB332	1.69	316B
Sick of Alan's saintly behavior, Gumball sets out to test the limits of Alan's goody-goody personality by ruining his life, but when that fails, he decides to be just as positive and charitable as Alan.
106	30	"The Friend"	Ben Bocquelet, Guillaume Cassuto, Joe Parham, Jess Ransom, and Tobi Wilson	Andy Kelly and Wandrille Maunoury	January 22, 2015	GB324	2.07	316A
After no one comes to Anais' birthday party and Anais reveals she has no friends, Gumball and Darwin help their sister make up an imaginary friend who turns out to be all too real – and wanted by the authorities.
107	31	"The Oracle"	Ben Bocquelet, Guillaume Cassuto, Mic Graves, Tony Hull, Richard Overall, Joe Parham, and Tobi Wilson	Aurelie Charbonnier and Akis Dimitrakopoulos	January 29, 2015	GB327	1.80	315A
During a yard sale at the Banana house, Gumball happens upon a collection of paintings done by Banana Barbara, all of which have been finished before the events portrayed in them occurred. When her latest work of art depicts Gumball appearing naked at the mall in front of an angry mob, Gumball does everything he can to prevent it from happening.
108	32	"The Safety"	Ben Bocquelet, Guillaume Cassuto, Louise Coats, Joe Parham, and Tobi Wilson	Adrian Maganza	February 5, 2015	GB333	1.89	315B
After watching a scary safety video, Darwin develops an unhealthy obsession with safety which spreads throughout Elmore and culminates in a plan for world domination.
109	33	"The Society"	Ben Bocquelet, Jess Ransom, Joe Parham, and Tobi Wilson	Wandrille Maunoury	February 12, 2015	GB334	1.64	317A
Gumball believes that the reason for his bad luck around Elmore Junior High is his exclusion from a non-existent secret school society, and his determination to infiltrate it irritates those around him.
110	34	"The Spoiler"	Ben Bocquelet, Jess Ransom, and Tobi Wilson	Akis Dimitrakopoulos	February 19, 2015	GB335	2.21	317B
Gumball and Darwin must wait a week to watch a horror film entitled The Screamening, but the former struggles to last the week without hearing spoilers of the film's plot.
111	35	"The Countdown"	Ben Bocquelet, Guillaume Cassuto, Joe Parham, Jess Ransom, and Tobi Wilson	Wandrille Maunoury	February 26, 2015	GB331	1.90	318A
Miss Simian threatens to expel Gumball and Darwin from school if they turn up late again, so they race a clock in order to arrive on time. However, Gumball accidentally freezes time and the duo travel through time and space in order to get to school on time.
112	36	"The Nobody"	Ben Bocquelet, Louise Coats, Timothy Mills, Jess Ransom, Paul Rice, and Tobi Wilson	Akis Dimitrakopoulos	March 5, 2015	GB339	1.84	318B
After Gumball and Darwin got grounded by Nicole after blaming them for stealing their parents' and sister's belongings, such as Nicole's money, Richard's toothbrush, and Anais' Daisy the Donkey doll, they search for the culprit who sneaked in their house, which turns out to be Rob, who had lost his memory. They eventually find out that Rob was one of the people banished to the void whom Gumball and Darwin didn't help, thus committing Rob to become the nemesis of Gumball and Darwin.
113	37	"The Downer"	Ben Bocquelet, Jess Ransom, and Tobi Wilson	Aurelie Charbonnier, Chuck Klein, and Wandrille Maunoury	July 6, 2015	GB338	1.66	319A
Gumball's family tries to cheer up Gumball, who is in an inexplicably bad mood — and things get worse when Gumball finds himself the last person in Elmore after wishing everyone would go away and his misery comes to life and consumes Elmore.
114	38	"The Triangle"	Ben Bocquelet, Mic Graves, Timothy Mills, Richard Overall, Richard Preddy, and Joe Parham	Adrian Maganza	July 8, 2015	GB337	1.65	320A
Gumball grows jealous of Darwin's new talent at playing a swanee whistle and tries to sabotage him, only to be banned from the marching band. However, someone else is planning to sabotage Darwin as well.
115	39	"The Egg"	Ben Bocquelet, George Gendi, Guillaume Cassuto, Louise Coats, Mic Graves, Timothy Mills, Joe Parham, Jess Ransom, and Tobi Wilson	Adrian Maganza	August 6, 2015	GB340	1.75	319B
Anais has a play date with Billy Parham, but Nicole must contend with Billy's snobbish mother, Felicity. Note: This episode has aired in other countries (including its native UK) as a season three episode. In the United States, "The Return" aired instead, and "The Egg" aired in the US as an apparent season four episode. On digital streaming platforms, such as iTunes and Hulu, "The Egg" airs as a season three episode, though it's shown as the final episode, airing after "The Money."; Guest Animation Provided By: Montblanc Pictures Co. Ltd.
116	40	"The Money"	Ben Bocquelet, Guillaume Cassuto, Jess Ransom, Joe Parham, Louise Coats, Timothy Mills and Tobi Wilson	Adrian Maganza	July 9, 2015	GB336	1.76	320B
When Richard loses the family's money again, Larry the clerk offers them the chance to perform in a commercial for Joyful Burger to get paid with money, but Gumball -- who loathes the idea of selling out -- refuses to do the commercial and urges his family to keep their dignity in the face of losing their house, their car, and their show.
