= Wasted (British TV series) =

- Genre: Sitcom
- Written by: Jon Foster; J.D. Lamont
- Directed by: Tom Marshall
- Starring: Dylan Edwards; Danny Kirrane; Rose Reynolds; Gwyneth Keyworth; Sean Bean
- Country of origin: United Kingdom
- Original language: English
- No. of series: 1
- No. of episodes: 6

Production
- Executive producers: John O'Callaghan; Richard Osborne
- Producer: Phil Bowker
- Running time: 22 minutes

Original release
- Network: Channel 4
- Release: 26 July – 23 August 2016

Wasted is a six-episode British comedy TV series. It was written and created by Jon Foster and J.D. Lamont for E4. It began broadcasting with two episodes on 26 July 2016. The series' style has been compared to that of Spaced.

== Premise ==
After failing to make it as a DJ, Kent returns to his home village of Neston Berry (a fictional West Country village located somewhere near Yeovil) where he reunites with three school friends: Morpheus, Sarah and Alison. They reside at 'Stoned Henge', a souvenir shop/tattoo parlour, and have various aimless adventures while trying to stave off boredom. These adventures mostly involve getting drunk or smoking cannabis. Sean Bean plays Morpheus' imaginary spirit guide, a fictionalised version of himself but dressed as his character from Game of Thrones.

== Cast ==
- Danny Kirrane as Morpheus (real name, Paul Durkin), co-owner of the 'Stoned Henge' bong shop.
- Rose Reynolds as Sarah Durkin, sister of Morpheus, co-owner of the bong shop who wants to see the world.
- Gwyneth Keyworth as Alison, tattoo artist and the oblivious object of Morpheus' affection.
- Dylan Edwards as Kent, former boyfriend of Sarah, who returned to his hometown village having failed at being a DJ in Bristol.
- Sean Bean, as a spirit guide/Morpheus' subconscious in the form of a mix between a fictional version of Sean as well as two roles he's performed: Boromir and Ned Stark.
- Tom Canton as Holy Man (real name, Chris), a drug dealer and on-again/off-again boyfriend of Alison.
- Harrie Hayes as Verian, enthusiastic admirer of Morpheus and organiser of the Berry Man Festival.
- Jamie Demetriou as Alistair, owner of the Other Pub.
- Matthew Jacobs Morgan as Jason, Kent's colleague at Birdland.
- Tony Miller as Mick the Druid.

== Episodes ==
No.	Title	Directed by	Written by	Original release date	UK viewers (millions)
1	Nineties Pills	Tom Marshall	Jon Foster & James Lamont	26 July 2016	0.28
After discovering Alison has a thing for Jeremy Paxman, Morpheus resurrects the local pub quiz. Meanwhile Alison and Sarah discover a stash of ecstasy pills from a 1990s festival.
2	The Odyssey	Tom Marshall	Jon Foster & James Lamont	26 July 2016	N/A
After a night out Morpheus leads the gang on an eight mile walk home. Kent meets a girl at a club he is desperate to impress. Sarah goes through the seven stages of drunkenness and Alison must be ready for her driving test.
3	The Other Pub	Tom Marshall	Jon Foster & James Lamont	2 August 2016	N/A
After being disappointed by their local carvery the gang head to a new pub, only to discover it's run by friend from school. Kent is extremely jealous. Meanwhile Alison bumps into her ex, giving Morpheus reason to tell her how he feels about her. Sean Bean thinks it's a bad idea.
4	The Berryman	Tom Marshall	Jon Foster & James Lamont	9 August 2016	N/A
Morpheus is asked to play the Berryman at the local festival. The Berryman's chaste nature causes a moral dilemma when he discovers that Verian, the festival's organiser, fancies him. Sarah meets the good looking man from the local bat rescue but her advances are a little disastrous. Kent and Alison discover a new way to get wasted.
5	Come Down Day	Tom Marshall	Jon Foster & James Lamont	16 August 2016	N/A
After partying late into the night Kent has a comedown day and makes himself paranoid. Sarah takes Alison to a pretentious artist's barbecue; they are horrified by his didgeridoo. Things get a little out of hand for Morpheus when he goes out for lunch with Kent's mum.
6	Sex Party	Tom Marshall	Jon Foster & James Lamont	23 August 2016	N/A
Alison has a spare ticket to a "sex party" and persuades Morpheus to attend. Sarah and Kent tag along, but their photocopied tickets are inadmissible so return to the car for a spliff. They break into the mansion. Inside, things are a bit of a let down. Alison pushes Morpheus into various rooms, his repeated attempts to confess that it is only Alison he wants are always interrupted. He follows an Eyes Wide Shut-style procession of cloaked figures into Room 42. Sarah and Kent, ejected again, retire to the car for another spliff; their realization they still have feelings for each other are interrupted by the arrival of a traumatised Morpheus.
