= Tom Canton =

British and Irish actor (born 1989)

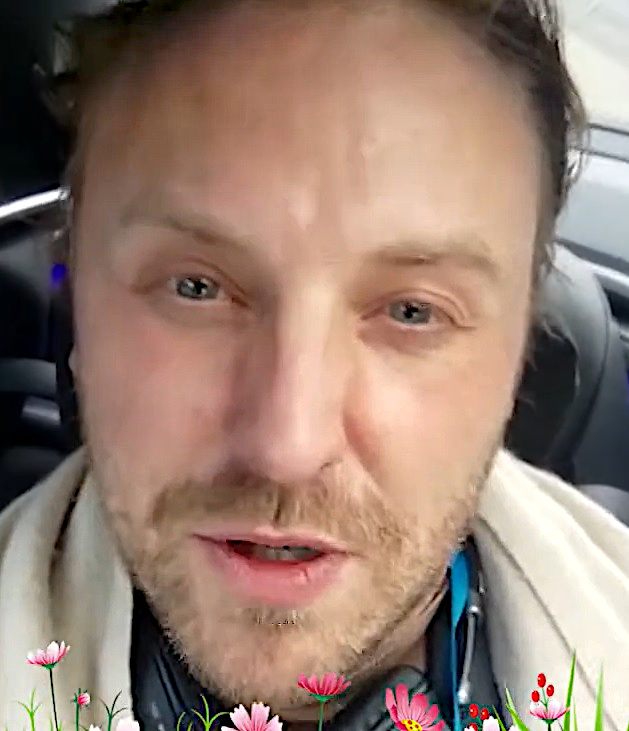
- Canton in 2022
- Born: October 27, 1989 (age 36); England
- Citizenship: United Kingdom; Ireland
- Occupation: Actor
- Years active: 2010–present
- Known for: Death Comes to Pemberley, Wasted, The Witcher

Tom Canton (born 27 October 1989) is a British and Irish actor and voice actor.

== Career ==
Canton made his film acting debut in the short film Shitkicker in 2010. This was followed by casting in the miniseries Death Comes to Pemberley and Houdini and Doyle as well as in the television series Wasted and The Collection. In 2019 he appeared in an episode of the television series Endeavour. He became known to a wide audience in 2019 in the Netflix series The Witcher through his role as the Elf King Filavandrel, whom he played up to and including 2023. Following the character's death in the third season, he left the series after ten episodes. In 2021 he voiced the same role in the animated film The Witcher: Nightmare of the Wolf.

As a stage actor, Canton performed in plays at the Gate Theatre, The Abbey Theater and the Almeida Theater, among others. In the latter he played in Shakespeare's Richard III, with the dual role of Sir Robert Brakenbury / Earl of Richmond. The work was released as a film on July 21, 2016.

== Filmography ==
=== Film and television ===
- 2010: Shitkicker (short film)
- 2013: Death Comes to Pemberley' (miniseries, 3 episodes)
- 2016: Houdini and Doyle (miniseries, episode 1x05)
- 2016: Wasted (TV series, 4 episodes)
- 2016: The Collection (TV series, episode 1x03)
- 2016: Richard III (film of theatrical version)
- 2017: The Good Karma Hospital (TV series, 3 episodes)
- 2018: Pixies (TV series, episode 1x01)
- 2018: In My Skin (TV series)
- 2018: Dark Heart (TV series, 2 episodes)
- 2018: Farming (film)
- 2019: Endeavour (TV series, episode 6x01)
- 2019–2023: The Witcher (TV series, 11 episodes)
- 2020: Truth Seekers (TV series, episode 1x03)
- 2021: The Witcher: Nightmare of the Wolf (Voice, animated film)
- 2022: Bloods (TV series, episode 2x07)

== Theatre ==
- 2012: The Picture of Dorian Grey, The Abbey Theatre, Dublin
- 2013: Great Expectations, Bristol Old Vic
- 2014–15: Wuthering Heights, The Gate Theater, Dublin
- 2016: Richard III, directed by Rupert Goold, Robin Lough, Almeida Theater
