= Rose Reynolds =

British actress and singer (born 1991)

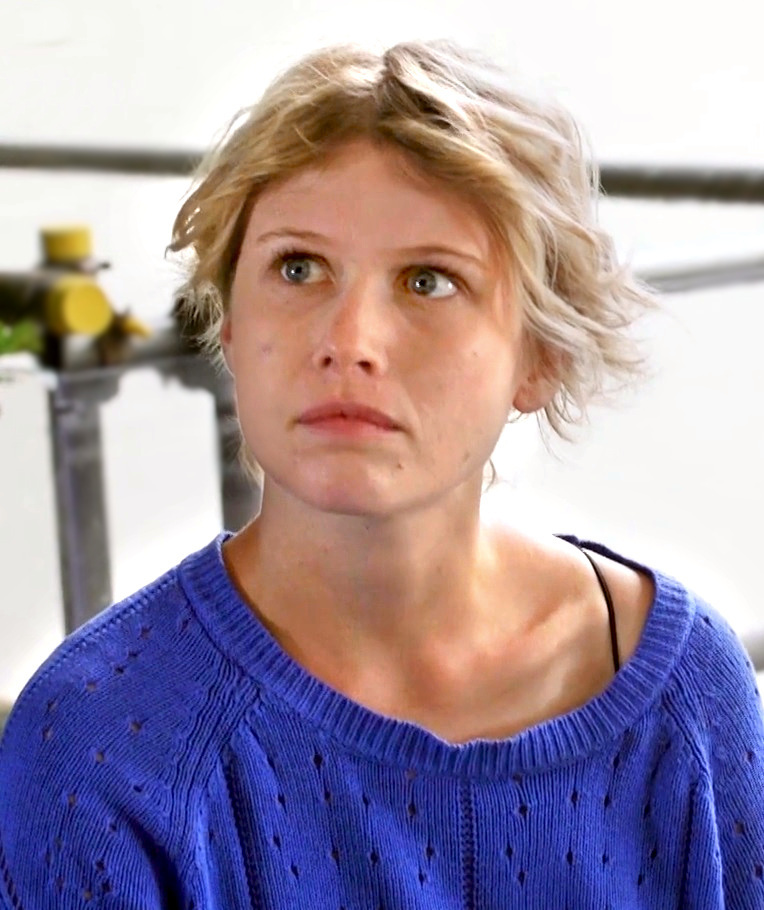
- Reynolds in Drunk Dialling 2015
- Born: Rose Alice Reynolds; 21 February 1991 (age 35); Exeter, Devon, England, UK
- Education: Guildhall School of Music and Drama
- Occupation: Actress
- Years active: 2010–present

Rose Alice Reynolds (born 21 February 1991) is a British actress and singer. She is most known for her roles as Sarah Durkin in Wasted, Betty Carkeek in Poldark and Alice in Once Upon a Time. Alongside these roles, she has also appeared in episodes of the BBC soap operas Doctors and EastEnders in 2014 and 2022 respectively.

== Early life ==
Reynolds was born in Exeter, Devon where her family still resides.

She graduated from the Guildhall School of Music and Drama in 2012. She has also studied performing arts at the Stage by Stage Academy in Exeter.

== Career ==
Reynolds has spent many years of her acting career working in stage productions, which include Tiger Tail, Candide, Twelfth Night, and My Children! My Africa!.

In 2013, Reynolds received a Commendation at the Ian Charleson Awards for her 2012 performance as Lavinia in Titus Andronicus at the Royal Shakespeare Company. A year later, Reynolds appeared in an episode of the BBC soap opera Doctors as Paula Abbot.

In 2017, Reynolds portrayed Alice and her cursed identity, Tilly, on the series Once Upon a Time. In 2022, she played Glenda Mitchell in an episode of the BBC soap opera EastEnders.

== Filmography ==
Film roles
Year	Title	Role	Notes
2013	The World's End	Tracy Benson	Film
2014	Drunk Dialling	Lucy	Short film
2015	Uneventful	-	Short film
2019	Fridge	Woman	Short film
2020	Magic Man	Maisie	Short film
2022	Sensibility	Elizabeth Howard	Short film
2022	A Grand Romantic Gesture	Debra	Film
2024	DarkGame	Lisa	Film

Television roles
Year	Title	Role	Notes
2010	Our Zoo	Alice	Episode: "The Idea"
2014	Doctors	Paula Abbot	Episode: "Do No Harm"
2016	Wasted	Sarah Durkin	Main role - 6 episodes
2016	Poldark	Betty Carkeek	2 episodes
2017–2018	Once Upon a Time	Alice/Tilly	Recurring role (season 7) - 14 episodes
2021	Alex Rider	PC Geri Crawford	Season 2, episode 1 - "surf"
2022	EastEnders	Glenda Mitchell	Episode 6550
2023	I'm With Me	Cindy Hunter	TV Film
