= The Amazing World of Gumball season 4 =

The Amazing World of Gumball
- Season 4
- Cover art for digital download for the second half
- Showrunner: Ben Bocquelet
- No. of episodes: 40

Release
- Original network: Cartoon Network
- Original release: July 7, 2015 – October 27, 2016

Season chronology
- ← Previous; Season 3 Next → Season 5

The fourth season of the British-American animated sitcom The Amazing World of Gumball, created by Ben Bocquelet, aired on Cartoon Network in the United States, and was produced by Cartoon Network Development Studio Europe. The series focuses on the misadventures of Gumball Watterson, a blue 12-year-old cat, along with his adopted brother, Darwin, a goldfish. Together, they cause mischief among their family, as well as with the wide array of students at Elmore Junior High, where they attend middle school. The season began filming on January 6, 2015, and ended filming on April 28, 2016.

The season had an average of 1.356 million viewers per episode, a decrease from previous seasons, Season 1(1.998), Season 2(1.712), and Season 3(1.937).

== Production ==
This season notably the last one entirely directed by Mic Graves. "The Fury" also features a special anime sequence which was animated by Studio 4°C, and directed by Tokuyuki Matsutake.

== Episodes ==
No. overall	No. in season	Title	Written by	Storyboarded by	Original release date	U.K air date	Prod. code	US viewers (millions)
117	1	"The Return"	Ben Bocquelet, Louise Coats, Mic Graves, Andrew Jones, Ciaran Murtagh, Joe Parham, and Tobi Wilson	Adrian Maganza	July 7, 2015	October 8, 2015	GB406	2.04
It's the first day back to school for Gumball, Darwin, and Anais, but the three are nowhere to be found – and when Richard discovers that he left them in a ballpit at the mall that is about to be shipped to another country, Richard must prove that he's a good father by getting his kids to school without Nicole knowing. Note: Despite being produced as a part of season four and being referred to as the season four premiere on TV Guide, the episode actually aired as the thirty-eighth episode of season three in the United States.
118	2	"The Nemesis"	Ben Bocquelet, Louise Coats, Mic Graves, Timothy Mills, Joe Parham, and Jess Ransom	Adrian Maganza	July 10, 2015	October 8, 2015	GB402	1.63
Gumball and Darwin's sworn enemy Rob has been trying to get revenge on them ever since, but when all of his attempts fail, Gumball and Darwin decide to help him out and end up leading Rob to concoct a plan to flood the entire town. Guest Star: David Warner as Rob's Dr. Wrecker persona
119	3	"The Crew"	Ben Bocquelet, Louise Coats, Mic Graves, Timothy Mills, Joe Parham, Richard Preddy, Jess Ransom, and Tobi Wilson	Aurelie Charbonnier	August 13, 2015	October 9, 2015	GB401	1.54
Gumball and Darwin decide to join the senior citizens' crew after determining that they are the most "hardcore" gang in Elmore, but get in over their heads when they think one of them wants their former colleague eliminated for leaving them. Note: In the United Kingdom and on such digital platforms as iTunes, Amazon Prime, and Hulu Plus, the episode ends with the Doughnut Sheriff tasering Marvin as the latter is trying to explain that he's unarmed. Versions shown on most Cartoon Network channels and the Cartoon Network app end the episode with Marvin, Betty, and Donald surrounded by the police in the river basin after Gumball and Darwin leave.
120	4	"The Others"	Nathan Auerbach, Daniel Berg, Ben Bocquelet, Louise Coats, Timothy Mills, and Joe Parham	Aurelie Charbonnier	August 20, 2015	October 12, 2015	GB404	1.35
When Gumball and Darwin learn that Anais is an eighth grader and Elmore Junior High has more students than the ones they usually encounter, the show turns into a teen drama called The So-Called World of Clare, about a mopey, green-haired girl named Clare Cooper saying goodbye to her friends before moving away, and Gumball and Darwin keep shoe-horning themselves into Clare's story so they can give her a happy ending.
121	5	"The Signature"	Nathan Auerbach, Daniel Berg, Ben Bocquelet, Louise Coats, and Tobi Wilson	Chuck Klein and Wandrille Maunoury	August 27, 2015	October 13, 2015	GB403	1.44
When Richard learns of Granny Jojo's plans to marry Louie (whom she has been dating since season 3's "The Man"), he decides to keep Louie from being his stepfather by adopting him as one of the kids. Things get stickier when Louie tricks Nicole into being adopted as his daughter and Richard's estranged, biological father, a rat named Frankie, returns to trick Richard into signing over the house to him. Guest Star: Rich Fulcher as Frankie Watterson
122	6	"The Check"	Nathan Auerbach, Daniel Berg, Ben Bocquelet, Louise Coats, Jess Ransom, and Tobi Wilson	Wandrille Maunoury	August 31, 2015	October 15, 2015	GB407	1.64
Gumball, Darwin and Anais are delighted when Grandpa Louie gives them a check for $5000, but the family soon fights over how to spend it.
123	7	"The Pest"	Nathan Auerbach, Daniel Berg, Ben Bocquelet, Louise Coats, Joe Parham, Jess Ransom, and Tobi Wilson	Aurelie Charbonnier	September 1, 2015	October 23, 2015	GB409	1.35
Gumball and Darwin help Anais when she's being harassed by Billy Parham, who's still sore over Anais breaking off their friendship.
124	8	"The Sale"	Nathan Auerbach, Daniel Berg, Ben Bocquelet, Louise Coats, Joe Parham, and Tobi Wilson	Akis Dimitrakopoulos	September 2, 2015	October 19, 2015	GB410	1.43
Gumball and Darwin are crushed to learn that Mr. Robinson is selling his house and moving away, and when trying to make their final moments together last doesn't work, the duo decide to sabotage the sale.
125	9	"The Gift"	Nathan Auerbach, Daniel Berg, Ben Bocquelet, Louise Coats, Mark Evans, Joe Parham, and Tobi Wilson	Aurelie Charbonnier	September 3, 2015	October 14, 2015	GB408	1.50
It's Masami's birthday and Elmore Junior High's students race to get her the perfect gift, as Masami's father is the head of the Rainbow Factory and if his daughter doesn't have a great present, they could get run out of town. Guest Star: Togo Igawa as Mr. Yoshida
126	10	"The Parking"	Nathan Auerbach, Daniel Berg, Ben Bocquelet, Louise Coats, Mic Graves, Joe Parham, and Tobi Wilson	Adrian Maganza	September 4, 2015	October 21, 2015	GB413	1.44
On a family day at Elmore Mall, the Wattersons struggle to find a parking space.
127	11	"The Routine"	Nathan Auerbach, Daniel Berg, Ben Bocquelet, Louise Coats, Andrew Jones, Ciaran Murtagh, Tom Neenan, Joe Parham, Tobi Wilson, and Andy Wolton	Wandrille Maunoury	October 5, 2015	October 20, 2015	GB411	1.32
Richard's trip to the store to find mayonnaise for the family's burger night turns into a Neverending Story-meets-Conan the Barbarian-style quest where he squares off against Tina's father. Guest Star: Togo Igawa as the narrator
128	12	"The Upgrade"	Nathan Auerbach, Daniel Berg, Ben Bocquelet, Louise Coats, Mic Graves, Joe Parham, and Tobi Wilson	Akis Dimitakopoulos	October 6, 2015	October 22, 2015	GB415	1.26
Gumball and Darwin upgrade Bobert and discover that his new operating system is full of buggy and useless applications and is prone to crashing.
129	13	"The Comic"	Ben Bocquelet, Louise Coats, Andrew Jones, Ciaran Murtagh, Oliver Kindeberg, (Note: Credited as Ollie Neck) Tobi Wilson, and Matt Zeqiri	Adrian Maganza	October 7, 2015	October 26, 2015	GB419	1.13
Sarah G. Lato (the gelato cone girl from "The Sweaters" and "The Fan" who obsessively draws fan art of Gumball and Darwin) creates a fanfic comic of Gumball as a superhero named LaserHeart, prompting Gumball to act like one in real life. Guest Artwork Provided By: Bruno Mangyoku
130	14	"The Romantic"	Nathan Auerbach, Daniel Berg, Ben Bocquelet, Louise Coats, Joe Parham, and Tobi Wilson	Yani Ouabdesselam	October 8, 2015	November 1, 2015	GB414	1.39
Fearing that she may be sick of him due to a missing emoji on her message to him, Gumball sends Penny on a romantic quest to rekindle their love, which turns into a disaster when Penny gets lost in the woods and is attacked by its wildlife. Note: Just for this episode, Penny was taken over as the protagonist which is given the majority of the runtime instead of the Wattersons' role, including Gumball.
131	15	"The Uploads"	Nathan Auerbach, Daniel Berg, Ben Bocquelet, Louise Coats, Andrew Jones, Ciaran Murtagh, Joe Parham and Tobi Wilson	Yani Ouabdesselam	October 9, 2015	November 21, 2015	GB420	1.24
Gumball gets hooked on watching Elmore Stream (the show's version of YouTube) despite Darwin's warning and viewers get a look at the different online videos the residents of Elmore have uploaded on the Internet. Username References: Oli_Hamilton (Oliver Hamilton), B Bocquelet (Ben Bocquelet), and Ricky O (Richard Overall)
132	16	"The Apprentice"	Nathan Auerbach, Daniel Berg, Ben Bocquelet, Louise Coats, Mic Graves, Richard Preddy, Phil Whelans, and Tobi Wilson	Adrian Maganza	December 4, 2015 (Online); January 7, 2016 (TV)	October 5, 2015	GB412	1.16
Gumball tags along with Penny's father, Patrick, as he prepares to pitch plans for a new hospital to the CEO of Chanax -- and ends up roping him into a golf game with the CEO.
133	17	"The Hug"	Ben Bocquelet, Louise Coats, Andrew Jones, Ciaran Murtagh, and Tobi Wilson	Yani Ouabdesselam	December 11, 2015 (Online); January 14, 2016 (TV)	October 16, 2015	GB405	1.08
To prove to Darwin that he can be unpredictable, Gumball decides to hug the first person he sees -- an anthropomorphic hot dog -- and Gumball ends up in over his head when he and the Hot Dog Guy can't stop bumping into each other.
134	18	"The Wicked"	Nathan Auerbach, Ben Bocquelet, Louise Coats, Mic Graves, Timothy Mills, Joe Parham, and Tobi Wilson	Wandrille Maunoury	November 17, 2015 (France); December 18, 2015 (Online); January 21, 2016 (TV)	November 22, 2015	GB417	1.54
After Mrs. Robinson frames Gumball and Darwin for feeding coffee and prune juice-laced nuts to the squirrels, Darwin tries to prove to Gumball that Mrs. Robinson is a good person underneath her destructive, sociopathic tendencies, but when Darwin sees just how evil she is, the duo decide to catch her committing grand theft auto.
135	19	"The Traitor"	Nathan Auerbach, Daniel Berg, Ben Bocquelet, Guillaume Cassuto, Joe Parham, and Tobi Wilson	Adrian Maganza	December 28, 2015 (Online); January 28, 2016 (TV)	April 11, 2016	GB422	1.32
When Alan allegedly ditches Gumball's dinner date with him, Gumball is desperate to track him down and make him pay for his betrayal, only to learn that Alan is taking his mother, Jessica, to the hospital for an organ transplant.
136	20	"The Origins"	Nathan Auerbach, Daniel Berg, Ben Bocquelet, Louise Coats, Mic Graves, Joe Parham, and Tobi Wilson	Aurelie Charbonnier	February 15, 2016	February 15, 2016	GB416	2.17
137	21	"The Origins"	Nathan Auerbach, Daniel Berg, Ben Bocquelet, Louise Coats, Mic Graves, Andrew Jones, Ciaran Murtagh, Joe Parham, and Tobi Wilson	Aurelie Charbonnier	February 15, 2016	February 15, 2016	GB418	2.17
In this first half-hour episode, a four-year-old Gumball becomes too much for young parents, Nicole and Richard, to handle, so they buy him a goldfish, but after the first seven die from neglect, stupidity, and unfortunate incidents, Richard finds a special one named Darwin in a shady red van who bonds with Gumball on a spiritual level. This gets put to the test when Darwin accidentally gets flushed down the toilet and must traverse a scary, new adventure to return home. Song: I'm On My Way
138	22	"The Girlfriend"	Nathan Auerbach, Daniel Berg, Ben Bocquelet, Louise Coats, Mic Graves, Joe Parham, and Tobi Wilson	Yani Ouabdesselam	March 4, 2016 (Online); March 30, 2016 (TV)	May 2, 2016	GB436	1.18
After seeing Alan and Carmen bond during her lunchtime bullying, Jamie decides that she needs a sweetheart...and has her eyes on Darwin.
139	23	"The Advice"	Nathan Auerbach, Daniel Berg, Ben Bocquelet, Louise Coats, Mic Graves, Joe Parham, and Tobi Wilson	Wandrille Maunoury	January 22, 2016 (Online); April 21, 2016 (TV)	April 18, 2016	GB421	1.12
Mr. Small feels a little sad that he hasn't inspired the children of Elmore Junior High, so Gumball and Darwin try to lift his spirits...and end up causing chaos and putting most of the students (and faculty) in the school infirmary (and others in the hospital) after following Mr Small's useless and bad advice.
140	24	"The Signal"	Ben Bocquelet, Mic Graves, Andrew Jones, Ciaran Murtagh, Joe Parham, and Tobi Wilson	Akis Dimitrakopoulos	January 29, 2016 (Online); April 28, 2016 (TV)	April 25, 2016	GB423	1.28
Mysterious satellite interruptions plaguing Elmore cause a strain between Gumball and Darwin, while Richard tearfully has to part with his television set when he can't fix it.
141	25	"The Parasite"	Nathan Auerbach, Daniel Berg, Ben Bocquelet, Guillaume Cassuto and Tobi Wilson	Yani Ouabdesselam	March 11, 2016 (Online); May 5, 2016 (TV)	May 16, 2016	GB425	1.04
Gumball and Darwin find out Anais made another new friend (a duck named Jodie), but, after reading her diary and seeing her interact with Jodie, they begin to suspect that Anais' new friend is using her. NOTE: On most Cartoon Network channels and the Cartoon Network app, this episode was shown without its title card. On Hulu Plus, the episode airs with its title card. Guest Star: Jenny Fellner as Jodie Mallard
142	26	"The Love"	Ben Bocquelet, Andrew Jones, Ciaran Murtagh, Joe Parham, and Tobi Wilson	Aurelie Charbonnier	March 18, 2016 (Online); May 12, 2016 (TV)	May 23, 2016	GB427	1.14
After Bobert confesses to Gumball and Darwin that he's fallen in love, a musical number and series of vignettes illustrate what love is and how the people of Elmore express it. Guest star: David Warner as Rob and Simon Day as the "Love is Chemistry" narrator
143	27	"The Awkwardness"	Nathan Auerbach, Daniel Berg, Ben Bocquelet, Guillaume Cassuto, Joe Parham, and Tobi Wilson	Yani Ouabdesselam	March 25, 2016 (Online); May 19, 2016 (TV)	June 6, 2016	GB428	1.10
A simple run to the store for ketchup leads Gumball to once again encounter The Hot Dog Guy (from "The Hug") and try to get away from him.
144	28	"The Nest"	Nathan Auerbach, Daniel Berg, Ben Bocquelet, Guillaume Cassuto, and Tobi Wilson	Wandrille Maunoury	May 17, 2016 (France); May 26, 2016 (USA)	May 28, 2016	GB424	1.05
Elmore residents are going missing, and the cause of these disappearances may be closer to home than the Wattersons think.
145	29	"The Points"	Nathan Auerbach, Daniel Berg, Ben Bocquelet, Joe Parham, and Tobi Wilson	Wandrille Maunoury	May 18, 2016 (France); June 2, 2016 (USA)	June 20, 2016	GB433	1.41
Gumball and Darwin do chores for Tobias (who is currently feeding his addiction to playing online games with in-app purchases) in the hopes of earning points for cash.
146	30	"The Bus"	Nathan Auerbach, Daniel Berg, Ben Bocquelet, Mic Graves, Joe Parham, and Tobi Wilson	Wandrille Maunoury	June 9, 2016	June 13, 2016	GB429	1.15
To teach the kids a lesson in not playing hooky from school, Rocky purposely drives past the school and picks up four hijackers (Principal Brown, Richard, Harold, and Dexter) who hold everyone hostage, but they end up running from the police. Guest star: David Warner as Rob
147	31	"The Night"	Nathan Auerbach, Daniel Berg, Ben Bocquelet, Guillaume Cassuto, Joe Parham, and Tobi Wilson	Aurelie Charbonnier	June 16, 2016	July 12, 2016	GB431	1.32
The moon examines the dreams and nightmares of Elmore's residents. Guest star: Sir Derek Jacobi as the Moon; Song: I'm a Bun
148	32	"The Misunderstandings"	Ben Bocquelet, Andrew Jones, Ciaran Murtagh, Joe Parham, and Tobi Wilson	Aurelie Charbonnier	June 23, 2016	August 11, 2016	GB435	1.45
Gumball has a misunderstanding with Penny over where to meet during a lunch date — and his rush to the mall leads to a chain of misunderstandings with everyone he encounters.
149	33	"The Roots"	Nathan Auerbach, Daniel Berg, Ben Bocquelet, Joe Parham, and Tobi Wilson	Yani Ouabdesselam	August 15, 2016	September 5, 2016	GB432	1.08
After seeing a sad Darwin stare at a fish tank at the mall pet store, Nicole and the rest of the family think Darwin is unhappy with living on land and try to reconnect him with his piscine roots.
150	34	"The Blame"	Nathan Auerbach, Daniel Berg, Ben Bocquelet, Louise Coats, Guillaume Cassuto, Joe Parham, and Tobi Wilson	Adrian Maganza	August 16, 2016	September 12, 2016	GB434	1.43
After Billy Parham passes out from playing video games for the first time in his life, his mother, Felicity, moves to have all video games banned and encourages the children of Elmore to read instead, but the kids fight back with a performance showing how classic literature is rife with violent and morally dubious moments. Song: Books Are Violent
151	35	"The Slap"	Ben Bocquelet, Joe Markham, Joe Parham, John Sheerman, and Tobi Wilson	Wandrille Maunoury	August 17, 2016	September 19, 2016	GB439	1.46
After Gumball learns that Tobias slaps the butt of everyone he greets (and that Gumball is the only person to whom he hasn't done it), Gumball becomes obsessed with getting Tobias to slap him in the butt.
152	36	"The Detective"	Nathan Auerbach, Daniel Berg, Ben Bocquelet, Joe Parham, and Tobi Wilson	Wandrille Maunoury	August 18, 2016	October 25, 2016	GB437	1.11
In this send-up of police procedural TV shows (specifically True Detective), Anais investigates the case of her missing Daisy the Donkey Doll.
153	37	"The Fury"	Nathan Auerbach, Daniel Berg, Ben Bocquelet, Guillaume Cassuto, Louise Coats, Mic Graves, Joe Parham, and Tobi Wilson	Adrian Maganza	August 19, 2016	September 28, 2016	GB430	1.28
While rushing her kids to school, Nicole is reunited with an old rival and karate kohai, Masami's mother Yuki Yoshida, who wants to fight her, but Nicole refuses...until Yuki threatens to have her fired and take her house. Guest Star: Naoko Mori as Yuki Yoshida; Guest Animation provided by: Studio 4°C; Guest Animation directed by: Tokuyuki Matsutake
154	38	"The Compilation"	Rikke Asbjoern, Ben Bocquelet, James Hamilton, James Huntrods, Joe Markham, John Sheerman, and Tobi Wilson	Oliver Hamilton and Yani Ouabdesselam	August 25, 2016	October 18, 2016	GB440	1.17
In this companion piece to "The Uploads" (and spoof of blooper shows), Elmore's most popular viral videos are shown as part of a series called The Best of Elmore StreamIt.
155	39	"The Scam"	Nathan Auerbach, Daniel Berg, Ben Bocquelet, Guillaume Cassuto, Joe Parham, and Tobi Wilson	Adrian Maganza	October 27, 2016	May 15, 2016 (France and Asia); August 9, 2016 (Canada)	GB426	1.14
In this homage to Ghostbusters and Halloween special, Gumball scares the school into thinking a monster named Gargaroth is haunting the place, then recruits Carrie and Darwin (who has a crush on Carrie) as ghost exterminators in order to scam everyone in Elmore of their candy. Things get sticky, however, when Gargaroth turns out to be real and takes over the school. Note: Though this episode is considered part of the fourth season (and has aired as such in other countries like France, Canada, and the United Kingdom), it aired during the fifth season on Cartoon Network in America so it could air in October as a Halloween episode. On Hulu Plus, this episode is located in the season five list.
156	40	"The Disaster (Part 1)"	Ben Bocquelet, Andrew Jones, Ciaran Murtagh, Joe Parham, and Tobi Wilson	Aurelie Charbonnier and Adrian Maganza	September 5, 2016	November 11, 2016	GB438	1.19
When Rob buys a universal remote from the Awesome Store, he uses it to control Elmore and frames Gumball for ruining his life. But as Rob banishes Gumball into the Void, the remote goes in with him and Gumball hits the rewind button to get out -- only to end up going back to the beginning. Guest star: David Warner as Rob; Note 1: Both "The Disaster" and "The Rerun" are the second half-hour episode in the series.
