= Piwi+ =

French cable television channel

- Country: France
- Broadcast area: Belgium, France, Luxembourg, Monaco, Francophone Africa and Switzerland

Programming
- Language: French
- Picture format: 1080i HDTV (downscaled to 16:9 576i for the SDTV feed)

Ownership
- Owner: Canal+ Thématiques (Canal+)
- Sister channels: Canal+ Kids; Télétoon+

History
- Launched: 3 December 2003; 22 years ago
- Former names: Piwi (2003-2011)

Links
- Website: Piwi+

Availability

Terrestrial
- Easy TV (Congo): Channel 20

Piwi+ (formerly Piwi) is a French pay television channel for children aged 3 to 6, owned by the Canal+.

== History ==
Piwi was launched on December 3, 2003, as the preschool channel from Télévision Par Satellite. In 2007, TPS merged with its competitor Canalsat.

In 2016–2017, Piwi+ became a Canal+ exclusive all around the world, being removed of all French ISPs on 31 December 2016. It is also distributed on VOO in Belgium and Teleclub Les + in Switzerland.

== Mascots ==
Initially, Piwi had seven colorful planet mascots, with Soleil (sun) being the main one and part of the logo. At night, when the channel stopped its programs, a loop showed the planet mascots saying good night to the viewers.

With the 2011 rebrand, Piwi+ have only a yellow sun as a mascot, and a light blue moon sleeping with a melody during the night break. Since the end of 2019 when TiJi became 24h, Piwi+ is the last French kids TV channel to have a night break.

=== Mascots ===
Soleil
Color: Yellow
Soleil is a 3-year-old sun with yellow body and orange conical rays. She is the adventurous leader of the group. She is cheerful, bright, and very energetic.
Gourmand
Color: Orange
Gourmand is a 6-year-old planet with orange body and green bubbles. He is silly and very playful, and he also loves food.
Étoile
Color: Violet
Étoile is a 6-year-old planet with violet body and yellow flocks of hair. She is dreamy, calm, and magical.
Radar
Color: Indigo
Radar is an 8-year-old planet with indigo body with red satellites. He is curious, observant, and very smart.
Ventouse
Color: Green
Ventouse is a 7-year-old planet with green body and red suction cups. She is funny, playful, and a little mischievous.
Ressort
Color: Red
Ressort is a 9-year-old planet with red body and indigo springs. She is energetic, jumpy, and very active.
Peinture
Color: Blue
Peinture is a 5-year-old planet with blue body and yellow fountain tanks. He is creative, artistic, and very imaginative.

== See also ==
- Television in France
