= James Lamont (writer) =

British screenwriter

- Born: James Deon Lamont; 15 June 1982 (age 44); London, England
- Occupation: Screenwriter
- Writing career
- Pen name: J. D. Lamont
- Notable awards: BAFTA EMMY

James Deon Lamont (born 15 June 1982), also credited as J. D. Lamont, is a British screenwriter known for his frequent writing collaborations with Jon Foster, and for writing the "Paddington meets the Queen" sketch for the Platinum Jubilee.

== Career ==
=== Television and film work ===
Lamont and Jon Foster wrote the screenplay for Paddington in Peru, after having worked on the two previous movies Paddington and Paddington 2.

In 2021, Lamont and Foster worked with Jimmy Fallon on the NBC special 5 More Sleeps 'Till Christmas which was an adaptation of Fallon's book of the same title.

Alongside writing partner Foster, Lamont wrote the Cartoon Network animated series The Amazing World of Gumball, for which he won a BAFTA Children's Award in 2011 and 2012. He left the show shortly into the third season.

In 2019, he co-developed the animated television series The Adventures of Paddington along with Foster for which the pair won an EMMY. The show premiered on Gulli, M6, and Piwi+ in France, Nick Jr. in the UK, and Nickelodeon internationally and he will direct the third film with Foster.

In 2016, the pair wrote and created their own E4 sitcom WASTED, featuring Sean Bean.

Lamont and Foster wrote episodes for Cuckoo a BBC sitcom featuring Greg Davies.

In 2013, the pair wrote The Harry Hill Movie, along with Harry Hill.

=== Online ===
Lamont has written and performed for various online productions such as Ted or Dead for Channel Flip, Dom Jolly's Joy Stick, Dawn Porter's Bad Girls Guides, Ashen's Tech Dump, Normal Activity, Sleep Terrorist and Big Noises. He worked on a 30-minute webisode for Kit Kat Chunky in 2012.

== Awards ==
Lamont, along with Jon Foster, won the 2011 and 2012 British Academy Children's Award for writing on The Amazing World of Gumball.

He also won an Emmy for The Adventures of Paddington.
