= List of The Amazing World of Gumball episodes =

The Amazing World of Gumball is an animated sitcom created by Ben Bocquelet for Cartoon Network. The series follows the lives of 12-year-old Gumball Watterson, an anthropomorphic blue cat, and his adoptive goldfish brother Darwin, who attend middle school in the fictional city of Elmore, California. They often find themselves in various shenanigans around the city, during which they interact with fellow family members, younger sister Anais, mother Nicole, and father Richard, along with an extended supporting cast of characters.

The Amazing World of Gumball initially lasted for 240 11-minute episodes (120 half-hours) during the course of its original run. Episodes in the first three seasons are packaged as half-hour shows in particular. Mic Graves directed every episode of the first four seasons. A sequel series, entitled The Wonderfully Weird World of Gumball, premiered on Hulu and Disney+ (for bundle subscribers) in the United States on July 28, 2025.

== Series overview ==
=== The Amazing World of Gumball ===
Season	Episodes	Originally released	
Season	Episodes	First released	Last released
Pilot		May 9, 2008	
1	36	May 3, 2011	March 13, 2012
2	40	August 7, 2012	December 3, 2013
3	40	June 5, 2014	August 6, 2015
4	40	July 7, 2015	October 27, 2016
5	40	September 1, 2016	November 10, 2017
6	44	January 5, 2018	June 24, 2019
Darwin's Yearbook	6	December 14, 2019	December 28, 2019
The Gumball Chronicles	8	October 5, 2020	June 20, 2021

=== The Wonderfully Weird World of Gumball ===
Season	Episodes	Originally released
1	20	July 28, 2025
2	20	December 22, 2025

== The Amazing World of Gumball ==
=== Pilot (2008) ===
No.	Title	Written and directed by	Storyboarded by	Original release date
0	"Early Reel"	Ben Bocquelet	Sylvain Marc	May 9, 2008
Prototype versions of Gumball and Darwin try to escape from school by building a Rube Goldberg machine.

=== Season 1 (2011–12) ===
No. overall	No. in season	Title	Written by	Storyboarded by	Original release date	Prod. code	US viewers (millions)	Streaming no.
1	1	"The DVD"	Ben Bocquelet, Jon Foster, and James Lamont	Ben Marsaud	May 3, 2011	GB120	2.12	118B
2	2	"The Responsible"	Ben Bocquelet, Andrew Brenner, Jon Foster, Mic Graves, and James Lamont	Celine Gobinet	May 9, 2011	GB111	1.39	103A
3	3	"The Third"	Ben Bocquelet, Jon Foster, James Lamont, and Sam Ward	George Gendi	May 16, 2011	GB109	1.96	101A
4	4	"The Debt"	Ben Bocquelet, Jon Foster and James Lamont	George Gendi, Dave Smith, Philip Warner, and Chuck Klein	May 16, 2011	GB110	1.96	101B
5	5	"The End"	Ben Bocquelet, Jon Foster and James Lamont	Ben Marsaud	May 23, 2011	GB135	1.89	118A
6	6	"The Dress"	Ben Bocquelet, Mic Graves, and David Cadji-Newby	Chris Garbutt	May 23, 2011	GB112	1.89	103B
7	7	"The Quest"	Ben Bocquelet, Jon Foster and James Lamont	Aurelie Charbonnier and Chuck Klein	May 30, 2011	GB118	1.90	114A
8	8	"The Spoon"	Ben Bocquelet, Jon Foster, James Lamont, and Mic Graves	Ben Marsaud	May 30, 2011	GB106	1.90	114B
9	9	"The Pressure"	Ben Bocquelet, Jon Foster, James Lamont, and Sam Ward	Aurelie Charbonnier	June 6, 2011	GB115	2.18	102A
10	10	"The Painting"	Ben Bocquelet, Jon Foster, James Lamont, and Mic Graves	Ben Marsaud	June 13, 2011	GB107	1.96	102B
11	11	"The Laziest"	Ben Bocquelet, Jon Foster, James Lamont, and Mic Graves	George Gendi, Ben Marsaud, and Amandine Pécharman	June 20, 2011	GB121	N/A	104A
12	12	"The Ghost"	Ben Bocquelet, Jon Foster, James Lamont, and Mic Graves	George Gendi and Phillip Warner	June 27, 2011	GB108	N/A	104B
13	13	"The Mystery"	Ben Bocquelet, Jon Foster, James Lamont, and Mic Graves	George Gendi and Phillip Warner	July 11, 2011	GB113	2.53	105A
14	14	"The Prank"	Ben Bocquelet, Jon Foster, and James Lamont	George Gendi	July 18, 2011	GB123	1.91	105B
15	15	"The Gi"	Ben Bocquelet, Jon Foster, and James Lamont	Rob Latimer	July 25, 2011	GB124	2.30	106A
16	16	"The Kiss"	Ben Bocquelet and Mic Graves	George Gendi, Kent Osborne, and Darren Vandenburg	August 1, 2011	GB119	2.18	106B
17	17	"The Party"	Ben Bocquelet and Mic Graves	Aurelie Charbonnier and Rob Latimer	August 8, 2011	GB102	1.85	107A
18	18	"The Refund"	Ben Bocquelet, Jon Foster, and James Lamont	Ben Marsaud	August 15, 2011	GB126	2.10	107B
19	19	"The Robot"	Ben Bocquelet, Jon Foster, and James Lamont	Ben Marsaud	August 22, 2011	GB114	2.06	108A
20	20	"The Picnic"	Ben Bocquelet, James Lamont, and Mic Graves	Amandine Pécharman and Phillip Warner	August 29, 2011	GB105	1.91	108B
21	21	"The Goons"	Ben Bocquelet, Jon Foster, James Lamont, and Mic Graves	Aurelie Charbonnier	September 5, 2011	GB127	2.72	109A
22	22	"The Secret"	Ben Bocquelet, Jon Foster, and James Lamont	George Gendi	September 26, 2011	GB128	2.05	109B
23	23	"The Sock"	Ben Bocquelet, Jon Foster, James Lamont, and Sam Ward	Chuck Klein and Rob Latimer	October 3, 2011	GB129	2.00	110A
24	24	"The Genius"	Ben Bocquelet, Jon Foster, James Lamont, and Mic Graves	Jacques Gauthier and Rob Latimer	October 10, 2011	GB103	1.80	110B
25	25	"The Poltergeist"	Ben Bocquelet, Jon Foster, James Lamont, Mic Graves, and Sam Ward	Aurelie Charbonnier, Dave Needham, and Tom Parkinson	October 17, 2011	GB132	2.11	113B
26	26	"The Mustache"	Ben Bocquelet and Mic Graves	Ben Marsaud	November 21, 2011	GB130	2.08	111A
27	27	"The Date"	Ben Bocquelet, Jon Foster, and James Lamont	Ben Marsaud	November 28, 2011	GB117	2.20	111B
28	28	"The Club"	Ben Bocquelet, Jon Foster, James Lamont, and Mic Graves	Rob Latimer and Ben Marsaud	December 5, 2011	GB122	2.18	112A
29	29	"The Wand"	Ben Bocquelet, Jon Foster, James Lamont, and Mic Graves	George Gendi and Phillip Warner	January 24, 2012	GB125	1.83	112B
30	30	"The Ape"	Ben Bocquelet, Jon Foster, James Lamont, and Mic Graves	Chuck Klein and Rob Latimer	January 31, 2012	GB131	1.79	113A
31	31	"The Car"	Ben Bocquelet, Jon Foster, James Lamont, and Mic Graves	Ben Marsaud	February 7, 2012	GB101	1.68	115A
32	32	"The Curse"	Ben Bocquelet, Jon Foster, James Lamont, and Mic Graves	Rob Latimer and George Gendi	February 14, 2012	GB116	1.91	115B
33	33	"The Microwave"	Ben Bocquelet, Jon Foster, and James Lamont	Ben Marsaud	February 21, 2012	GB133	1.85	116A
34	34	"The Meddler"	Ben Bocquelet, Jon Foster, and James Lamont	Ben Marsaud	February 28, 2012	GB134	1.69	116B
35	35	"The Helmet"	Ben Bocquelet, Jon Foster, James Lamont, and Tommy Panays	Ben Marsaud	March 6, 2012	GB136	1.96	117A
36	36	"The Fight"	Ben Bocquelet, Jon Foster, James Lamont, and Mic Graves	Michael Gendi, Jacques Ganthier, and Darren Vandenburg	March 13, 2012	GB104	2.10	117B

=== Season 2 (2012–13) ===
No. overall	No. in season	Title	Written by	Storyboarded by	Original release date	Prod. code	US viewers (millions)	Streaming no.
37	1	"The Remote"	Ben Bocquelet, Jon Foster, James Lamont, and Mic Graves	Aurelie Charbonnier	August 7, 2012	GB202	1.81	202B
38	2	"The Colossus"	Ben Bocquelet, Jon Foster, James Lamont, and Mic Graves	Chuck Klein	August 14, 2012	GB208	1.59	201B
39	3	"The Knights"	Ben Bocquelet, Jon Foster, James Lamont, and Mic Graves	Aurelie Charbonnier	August 21, 2012	GB201	N/A	201A
40	4	"The Fridge"	Ben Bocquelet, Jon Foster, James Lamont, and Mic Graves	Sebastian Hary	September 4, 2012	GB203	2.00	202A
41	5	"The Flower"	Ben Bocquelet, Jon Foster, James Lamont, and Mic Graves	William Laborie and Chuck Klein	September 11, 2012	GB207	1.99	203A
42	6	"The Banana"	Ben Bocquelet, Jon Foster, and James Lamont	Adrian Maganza	September 11, 2012	GB209	1.99	203B
43	7	"The Phone"	Ben Bocquelet, Chris Garbutt, and Mic Graves	Sebastian Hary	September 18, 2012	GB204	1.83	204A
44	8	"The Job"	Ben Bocquelet, Jon Foster, James Lamont, and Mic Graves	Ben Marsaud	September 18, 2012	GB206	1.83	204B
45	9	"Halloween"	Ben Bocquelet, Jon Foster, and James Lamont	Aurelie Charbonnier, William Laborie, and Sebastian Hary (uncredited)	October 23, 2012	GB205	1.71	205A
46	10	"The Treasure"	Ben Bocquelet, Jon Foster, James Lamont, and Mic Graves	Ben Marsaud	October 30, 2012	GB211	1.95	205B
47	11	"The Apology"	Ben Bocquelet, Jon Foster, and James Lamont	Adrian Maganza	November 6, 2012	GB215	2.12	206B
48	12	"The Words"	Ben Bocquelet, Jon Foster, and James Lamont	Ben Marsaud	November 13, 2012	GB214	1.83	206A
49	13	"The Skull"	Ben Bocquelet, Jon Foster, James Lamont, and Mic Graves	Akis Dimitrakopoulos	November 20, 2012	GB212	1.86	207A
50	14	"The Bet"	Ben Bocquelet, Jon Foster, and James Lamont	Adrian Maganza	November 27, 2012	GB220	1.62	208B
51	15	"Christmas"	Ben Bocquelet, Jon Foster, and James Lamont	Chuck Klein and William Laborie	December 4, 2012	GB217	1.70	207B
52	16	"The Watch"	Ben Bocquelet, Jon Foster, and James Lamont	Jean Texier	January 22, 2013	GB219	1.75	208A
53	17	"The Bumpkin"	Ben Bocquelet, Jon Brittain, Jon Foster, James Lamont, and Mic Graves	Akis Dimitrakopoulos	January 29, 2013	GB222	1.84	209A
54	18	"The Flakers"	Ben Bocquelet, Jon Foster, and James Lamont	Ben Marsaud	February 5, 2013	GB218	1.65	209B
55	19	"The Authority"	Ben Bocquelet, Jon Brittain, Jon Foster, James Lamont, and Mic Graves	Ben Marsaud	February 12, 2013	GB223	1.78	210A
56	20	"The Virus"	Ben Bocquelet, Jon Foster, and James Lamont	Akis Dimitrakopoulos	June 5, 2013	GB216	2.57	210B
57	21	"The Pony"	Ben Bocquelet, Jon Brittain, Mic Graves, Jon Foster, and James Lamont	Ben Marsaud	June 12, 2013	GB225	1.95	211A
58	22	"The Hero"	Ben Bocquelet, Jon Foster, James Lamont, and Mic Graves	Jean Texier	June 19, 2013	GB210	1.37	213A
59	23	"The Dream"	Ben Bocquelet, Jon Brittain, Tom Crowley, Jon Foster, James Lamont, and Tobi Wilson	Adrian Maganza	June 26, 2013	GB226	1.59	212A
60	24	"The Sidekick"	Ben Bocquelet, Jon Brittain, Tom Crowley, Jon Foster, James Lamont, and Tobi Wilson	Adrian Maganza	July 3, 2013	GB229	1.76	212B
61	25	"The Photo"	Ben Bocquelet, Jon Brittain, Tom Crowley, Jon Foster, James Lamont, and Tobi Wilson	Jean Texier	July 17, 2013	GB228	1.20	213B
62	26	"The Tag"	Ben Bocquelet, Jon Brittain, Tom Crowley, Jon Foster, James Lamont, and Tobi Wilson	Akis Dimitrakopoulos	July 24, 2013	GB230	1.42	214A
63	27	"The Storm"	Ben Bocquelet, Jon Brittain, Jon Foster, and James Lamont	Ben Marsaud	July 31, 2013	GB221	1.57	211B
64	28	"The Lesson"	Ben Bocquelet, Jon Brittain, Tom Crowley, Jon Foster, James Lamont, and Tobi Wilson	Akis Dimitrakopoulos	August 7, 2013	GB227	1.42	214B
65	29	"The Game"	Ben Bocquelet, Jon Brittain, Tom Crowley, Jon Foster, James Lamont, and Tobi Wilson	Ben Marsaud	August 21, 2013	GB231	1.57	215B
66	30	"The Limit"	Ben Bocquelet, Jon Foster, Chris Garbutt, and James Lamont	Sebastian Hary, William Laborie, and Adrian Maganza	August 28, 2013	GB213	1.41	215A
67	31	"The Voice"	Ben Bocquelet, Jon Brittain, Tom Crowley, Jon Foster, James Lamont, and Tobi Wilson	Adrian Maganza	September 10, 2013	GB224	1.96	216B
68	32	"The Promise"	Ben Bocquelet, Jon Brittain, Tom Crowley, Jon Foster, James Lamont, and Tobi Wilson	Adrian Maganza	September 17, 2013	GB232	1.46	216A
69	33	"The Castle"	Ben Bocquelet, Jon Brittain, Tom Crowley, Jon Foster, James Lamont, and Tobi Wilson	Jean Texier	October 1, 2013	GB235	1.65	217B
70	34	"The Boombox"	Ben Bocquelet, Jon Brittain, Tom Crowley, Jon Foster, James Lamont, and Tobi Wilson	Jean Texier	October 8, 2013	GB234	1.46	217A
71	35	"The Tape"	Ben Bocquelet, Jon Foster, and James Lamont	Akis Dimitrakopoulos	October 15, 2013	GB238	1.44	218A
72	36	"The Sweaters"	Ben Bocquelet, Jon Foster, and James Lamont	Adrian Maganza	November 5, 2013	GB237	1.58	218B
73	37	"The Internet"	Yann Benedi, Ben Bocquelet, Guillaume Cassuto, and Antoine Perez	Chuck Klein	November 12, 2013	GB239	1.50	219A
74	38	"The Plan"	Ben Bocquelet, Jon Foster, James Lamont, and Tobi Wilson	Charles Schneck	November 19, 2013	GB240	1.53	219B
75	39	"The World"	Ben Bocquelet, Jon Brittain, Tom Crowley, Jon Foster, James Lamont, and Tobi Wilson	Chuck Klein	November 26, 2013	GB236	1.88	220A
76	40	"The Finale"	Ben Bocquelet, Jon Brittain, Tom Crowley, Jon Foster, James Lamont, and Tobi Wilson	Akis Dimitrakopoulos	December 3, 2013	GB233	1.63	220B

=== Season 3 (2014–15) ===
No. overall	No. in season	Title	Written by	Storyboarded by	Original release date	Prod. code	US viewers (millions)	Streaming no.
77	1	"The Kids"	Ben Bocquelet, Guillaume Cassuto, Mic Graves, and Tobi Wilson	Aurelie Charbonnier, Andy Kelly and Akis Dimitrakopoulos	June 5, 2014	GB301	2.39	301A
78	2	"The Fan"	Ben Bocquelet, Jess Ransom, Howard Read, Paul McKenna, and Tobi Wilson	Adrian Maganza	June 5, 2014	GB303	2.39	301B
79	3	"The Coach"	Tim Allsop, Ben Bocquelet, Ben Cottam, Paul McKenna, Jess Ransom, Stewart Williams, and Tobi Wilson	Adrian Maganza and Akis Dimitrakopoulos	June 12, 2014	GB306	1.68	302A
80	4	"The Joy"	Ben Bocquelet, Ben Cottam, Jon Foster, Mic Graves, Kieran Hodgson, Tom Meltzer, Joe Parham, Jess Ransom, and Tobi Wilson	Andy Kelly and Wandrille Maunoury	June 19, 2014	GB305	1.86	302B
81	5	"The Puppy"	Tim Allsop, Ben Bocquelet, Guillaume Cassuto, Mic Graves, Ben Cottam, and Stewart Williams	Aurelie Charbonnier	June 26, 2014	GB304	2.15	303B
82	6	"The Recipe"	Ben Bocquelet, Guillaume Cassuto, Mic Graves, and Tobi Wilson	Aurelie Charbonnier	July 3, 2014	GB311	2.17	303A
83	7	"The Name"	Tim Allsop, Ben Bocquelet, Mic Graves, Tom Meltzer, Joe Parham, and Stewart Williams	Chuck Klein	July 10, 2014	GB307	2.32	304A
84	8	"The Extras"	Ben Bocquelet, Guillaume Cassuto, and Mic Graves	Adrian Maganza and Aurelie Charbonnier	July 17, 2014	GB312	1.93	304B
85	9	"The Gripes"	Tim Allsop, Ben Bocquelet, Guillaume Cassuto, Kieran Hodgson, Mic Graves, Stewart Williams, and Tobi Wilson	Adrian Maganza	July 24, 2014	GB308	2.21	305A
86	10	"The Vacation"	Guillaume Cassuto, Mic Graves, and Tobi Wilson	Andy Kelly and Wandrille Maunoury	July 31, 2014	GB310	1.90	305B
87	11	"The Fraud"	Ben Bocquelet, Guillaume Cassuto, Mic Graves, and Tobi Wilson	Adrian Maganza	August 7, 2014	GB316	1.91	306A
88	12	"The Void"	Ben Bocquelet, Guillaume Cassuto, Mic Graves, Paul Rice, and Tobi Wilson	Akis Dimitrakopoulos and Wandrille Maunoury	August 14, 2014	GB309	1.90	306B
89	13	"The Boss"	Ben Bocquelet, Guillaume Cassuto, Mic Graves, Joe Parham, and Tobi Wilson	Andy Kelly and Wandrille Maunoury	August 21, 2014	GB313	1.82	307A
90	14	"The Move"	Ben Bocquelet, Guillaume Cassuto, Mic Graves, Joe Parham, and Tobi Wilson	Akis Dimitrakopoulos	August 28, 2014	GB317	1.88	307B
91	15	"The Law"	Guillaume Cassuto, Mic Graves, Joe Parham, and Tobi Wilson	Aurelie Charbonnier and Wandrille Maunoury	September 4, 2014	GB314	2.15	308A
92	16	"The Allergy"	Ben Bocquelet, Guillaume Cassuto, Mic Graves, and Joe Parham	Adrian Maganza	September 11, 2014	GB318	1.91	308B
93	17	"The Mothers"	Ben Bocquelet, Guillaume Cassuto, Jon Foster, Mic Graves, James Lamont, Joe Parham, and Tobi Wilson	Andy Kelly and Wandrille Maunoury	September 18, 2014	GB315	N/A	309A
94	18	"The Password"	Ben Bocquelet, Guillaume Cassuto, Mic Graves, and Joe Parham	Andy Kelly	September 25, 2014	GB320	2.00	309B
95	19	"The Procrastinators"	Ben Bocquelet, Guillaume Cassuto, Mic Graves, Joe Parham, and Tobi Wilson	Aurelie Charbonnier and Wandrille Maunoury	October 2, 2014	GB319	2.26	310A
96	20	"The Shell"	Ben Bocquelet, Guillaume Cassuto, Howard Read, James Lamont, Jon Foster, Tobi Wilson, and Tom Crowley	Aurelie Charbonnier	October 9, 2014	GB302	2.31	310B
97	21	"The Burden"	Ben Bocquelet, Guillaume Cassuto, Mic Graves, Joe Parham, Jess Ransom, and Tobi Wilson	Adrian Maganza	October 16, 2014	GB321	2.36	311B
98	22	"The Bros"	Ben Bocquelet, Guillaume Cassuto, Joe Parham, Jess Ransom, Mic Graves, and Tobi Wilson	Aurelie Charbonnier	October 23, 2014	GB322	1.70	312A
99	23	"The Mirror"	Ben Bocquelet, Guillaume Cassuto, Joe Parham, and Mic Graves	Akis Dimitrakopoulos and Wandrille Maunoury	October 30, 2014	GB323	1.61	311A
100	24	"The Man"	Ben Bocquelet, Guillaume Cassuto, Joe Parham, and Tobi Wilson	Aurelie Charbonnier	October 30, 2014	GB326	1.40	312B
101	25	"The Pizza"	Ben Bocquelet, Guillaume Cassuto, Joe Parham, and Tobi Wilson	Adrian Maganza	November 13, 2014	GB325	1.55	313A
102	26	"The Lie"	Ben Bocquelet, Guillaume Cassuto, Joe Parham, Jess Ransom, and Tobi Wilson	Adrian Maganza	November 20, 2014	GB328	1.66	313B
103	27	"The Butterfly"	Ben Bocquelet, Guillaume Cassuto, Joe Parham, Jess Ransom, and Tobi Wilson	Aurelie Charbonnier	January 8, 2015	GB330	2.14	314A
104	28	"The Question"	Ben Bocquelet, Guillaume Cassuto, Tony Hull, Joe Parham, and Tobi Wilson	Andy Kelly and Wandrille Maunoury	January 8, 2015	GB329	2.14	314B
105	29	"The Saint"	Ben Bocquelet, Joe Parham, Jess Ransom, and Tobi Wilson	Ben Marsaud	January 15, 2015	GB332	1.69	316B
106	30	"The Friend"	Ben Bocquelet, Guillaume Cassuto, Joe Parham, Jess Ransom, and Tobi Wilson	Andy Kelly and Wandrille Maunoury	January 22, 2015	GB324	2.07	316A
107	31	"The Oracle"	Ben Bocquelet, Guillaume Cassuto, Mic Graves, Tony Hull, Richard Overall, Joe Parham, and Tobi Wilson	Aurelie Charbonnier and Akis Dimitrakopoulos	January 29, 2015	GB327	1.80	315A
108	32	"The Safety"	Ben Bocquelet, Guillaume Cassuto, Louise Coats, Joe Parham, and Tobi Wilson	Adrian Maganza	February 5, 2015	GB333	1.89	315B
109	33	"The Society"	Ben Bocquelet, Jess Ransom, Joe Parham, and Tobi Wilson	Wandrille Maunoury	February 12, 2015	GB334	1.64	317A
110	34	"The Spoiler"	Ben Bocquelet, Jess Ransom, and Tobi Wilson	Akis Dimitrakopoulos	February 19, 2015	GB335	2.21	317B
111	35	"The Countdown"	Ben Bocquelet, Guillaume Cassuto, Joe Parham, Jess Ransom, and Tobi Wilson	Wandrille Maunoury	February 26, 2015	GB331	1.90	318A
112	36	"The Nobody"	Ben Bocquelet, Louise Coats, Timothy Mills, Jess Ransom, Paul Rice, and Tobi Wilson	Akis Dimitrakopoulos	March 5, 2015	GB339	1.84	318B
113	37	"The Downer"	Ben Bocquelet, Jess Ransom, and Tobi Wilson	Aurelie Charbonnier, Chuck Klein, and Wandrille Maunoury	July 6, 2015	GB338	1.66	319A
114	38	"The Triangle"	Ben Bocquelet, Mic Graves, Timothy Mills, Richard Overall, Richard Preddy, and Joe Parham	Adrian Maganza	July 8, 2015	GB337	1.65	320A
115	39	"The Egg"	Ben Bocquelet, George Gendi, Guillaume Cassuto, Louise Coats, Mic Graves, Timothy Mills, Joe Parham, Jess Ransom, and Tobi Wilson	Adrian Maganza	August 6, 2015	GB340	1.75	319B
116	40	"The Money"	Ben Bocquelet, Guillaume Cassuto, Jess Ransom, Joe Parham, Louise Coats, Timothy Mills and Tobi Wilson	Adrian Maganza	July 9, 2015	GB336	1.76	320B

=== Season 4 (2015–16) ===
No. overall	No. in season	Title	Written by	Storyboarded by	Original release date	U.K air date	Prod. code	US viewers (millions)
117	1	"The Return"	Ben Bocquelet, Louise Coats, Mic Graves, Andrew Jones, Ciaran Murtagh, Joe Parham, and Tobi Wilson	Adrian Maganza	July 7, 2015	October 8, 2015	GB406	2.04
118	2	"The Nemesis"	Ben Bocquelet, Louise Coats, Mic Graves, Timothy Mills, Joe Parham, and Jess Ransom	Adrian Maganza	July 10, 2015	October 8, 2015	GB402	1.63
119	3	"The Crew"	Ben Bocquelet, Louise Coats, Mic Graves, Timothy Mills, Joe Parham, Richard Preddy, Jess Ransom, and Tobi Wilson	Aurelie Charbonnier	August 13, 2015	October 9, 2015	GB401	1.54
120	4	"The Others"	Nathan Auerbach, Daniel Berg, Ben Bocquelet, Louise Coats, Timothy Mills, and Joe Parham	Aurelie Charbonnier	August 20, 2015	October 12, 2015	GB404	1.35
121	5	"The Signature"	Nathan Auerbach, Daniel Berg, Ben Bocquelet, Louise Coats, and Tobi Wilson	Chuck Klein and Wandrille Maunoury	August 27, 2015	October 13, 2015	GB403	1.44
122	6	"The Check"	Nathan Auerbach, Daniel Berg, Ben Bocquelet, Louise Coats, Jess Ransom, and Tobi Wilson	Wandrille Maunoury	August 31, 2015	October 15, 2015	GB407	1.64
123	7	"The Pest"	Nathan Auerbach, Daniel Berg, Ben Bocquelet, Louise Coats, Joe Parham, Jess Ransom, and Tobi Wilson	Aurelie Charbonnier	September 1, 2015	October 23, 2015	GB409	1.35
124	8	"The Sale"	Nathan Auerbach, Daniel Berg, Ben Bocquelet, Louise Coats, Joe Parham, and Tobi Wilson	Akis Dimitrakopoulos	September 2, 2015	October 19, 2015	GB410	1.43
125	9	"The Gift"	Nathan Auerbach, Daniel Berg, Ben Bocquelet, Louise Coats, Mark Evans, Joe Parham, and Tobi Wilson	Aurelie Charbonnier	September 3, 2015	October 14, 2015	GB408	1.50
126	10	"The Parking"	Nathan Auerbach, Daniel Berg, Ben Bocquelet, Louise Coats, Mic Graves, Joe Parham, and Tobi Wilson	Adrian Maganza	September 4, 2015	October 21, 2015	GB413	1.44
127	11	"The Routine"	Nathan Auerbach, Daniel Berg, Ben Bocquelet, Louise Coats, Andrew Jones, Ciaran Murtagh, Tom Neenan, Joe Parham, Tobi Wilson, and Andy Wolton	Wandrille Maunoury	October 5, 2015	October 20, 2015	GB411	1.32
128	12	"The Upgrade"	Nathan Auerbach, Daniel Berg, Ben Bocquelet, Louise Coats, Mic Graves, Joe Parham, and Tobi Wilson	Akis Dimitakopoulos	October 6, 2015	October 22, 2015	GB415	1.26
129	13	"The Comic"	Ben Bocquelet, Louise Coats, Andrew Jones, Ciaran Murtagh, Oliver Kindeberg, (Note: Credited as Ollie Neck) Tobi Wilson, and Matt Zeqiri	Adrian Maganza	October 7, 2015	October 26, 2015	GB419	1.13
130	14	"The Romantic"	Nathan Auerbach, Daniel Berg, Ben Bocquelet, Louise Coats, Joe Parham, and Tobi Wilson	Yani Ouabdesselam	October 8, 2015	November 1, 2015	GB414	1.39
131	15	"The Uploads"	Nathan Auerbach, Daniel Berg, Ben Bocquelet, Louise Coats, Andrew Jones, Ciaran Murtagh, Joe Parham and Tobi Wilson	Yani Ouabdesselam	October 9, 2015	November 21, 2015	GB420	1.24
132	16	"The Apprentice"	Nathan Auerbach, Daniel Berg, Ben Bocquelet, Louise Coats, Mic Graves, Richard Preddy, Phil Whelans, and Tobi Wilson	Adrian Maganza	December 4, 2015 (Online); January 7, 2016 (TV)	October 5, 2015	GB412	1.16
133	17	"The Hug"	Ben Bocquelet, Louise Coats, Andrew Jones, Ciaran Murtagh, and Tobi Wilson	Yani Ouabdesselam	December 11, 2015 (Online); January 14, 2016 (TV)	October 16, 2015	GB405	1.08
134	18	"The Wicked"	Nathan Auerbach, Ben Bocquelet, Louise Coats, Mic Graves, Timothy Mills, Joe Parham, and Tobi Wilson	Wandrille Maunoury	November 17, 2015 (France); December 18, 2015 (Online); January 21, 2016 (TV)	November 22, 2015	GB417	1.54
135	19	"The Traitor"	Nathan Auerbach, Daniel Berg, Ben Bocquelet, Guillaume Cassuto, Joe Parham, and Tobi Wilson	Adrian Maganza	December 28, 2015 (Online); January 28, 2016 (TV)	April 11, 2016	GB422	1.32
136	20	"The Origins"	Nathan Auerbach, Daniel Berg, Ben Bocquelet, Louise Coats, Mic Graves, Joe Parham, and Tobi Wilson	Aurelie Charbonnier	February 15, 2016	February 15, 2016	GB416	2.17
137	21	"The Origins"	Nathan Auerbach, Daniel Berg, Ben Bocquelet, Louise Coats, Mic Graves, Andrew Jones, Ciaran Murtagh, Joe Parham, and Tobi Wilson	Aurelie Charbonnier	February 15, 2016	February 15, 2016	GB418	2.17
138	22	"The Girlfriend"	Nathan Auerbach, Daniel Berg, Ben Bocquelet, Louise Coats, Mic Graves, Joe Parham, and Tobi Wilson	Yani Ouabdesselam	March 4, 2016 (Online); March 30, 2016 (TV)	May 2, 2016	GB436	1.18
139	23	"The Advice"	Nathan Auerbach, Daniel Berg, Ben Bocquelet, Louise Coats, Mic Graves, Joe Parham, and Tobi Wilson	Wandrille Maunoury	January 22, 2016 (Online); April 21, 2016 (TV)	April 18, 2016	GB421	1.12
140	24	"The Signal"	Ben Bocquelet, Mic Graves, Andrew Jones, Ciaran Murtagh, Joe Parham, and Tobi Wilson	Akis Dimitrakopoulos	January 29, 2016 (Online); April 28, 2016 (TV)	April 25, 2016	GB423	1.28
141	25	"The Parasite"	Nathan Auerbach, Daniel Berg, Ben Bocquelet, Guillaume Cassuto and Tobi Wilson	Yani Ouabdesselam	March 11, 2016 (Online); May 5, 2016 (TV)	May 16, 2016	GB425	1.04
142	26	"The Love"	Ben Bocquelet, Andrew Jones, Ciaran Murtagh, Joe Parham, and Tobi Wilson	Aurelie Charbonnier	March 18, 2016 (Online); May 12, 2016 (TV)	May 23, 2016	GB427	1.14
143	27	"The Awkwardness"	Nathan Auerbach, Daniel Berg, Ben Bocquelet, Guillaume Cassuto, Joe Parham, and Tobi Wilson	Yani Ouabdesselam	March 25, 2016 (Online); May 19, 2016 (TV)	June 6, 2016	GB428	1.10
144	28	"The Nest"	Nathan Auerbach, Daniel Berg, Ben Bocquelet, Guillaume Cassuto, and Tobi Wilson	Wandrille Maunoury	May 17, 2016 (France); May 26, 2016 (USA)	May 28, 2016	GB424	1.05
145	29	"The Points"	Nathan Auerbach, Daniel Berg, Ben Bocquelet, Joe Parham, and Tobi Wilson	Wandrille Maunoury	May 18, 2016 (France); June 2, 2016 (USA)	June 20, 2016	GB433	1.41
146	30	"The Bus"	Nathan Auerbach, Daniel Berg, Ben Bocquelet, Mic Graves, Joe Parham, and Tobi Wilson	Wandrille Maunoury	June 9, 2016	June 13, 2016	GB429	1.15
147	31	"The Night"	Nathan Auerbach, Daniel Berg, Ben Bocquelet, Guillaume Cassuto, Joe Parham, and Tobi Wilson	Aurelie Charbonnier	June 16, 2016	July 12, 2016	GB431	1.32
148	32	"The Misunderstandings"	Ben Bocquelet, Andrew Jones, Ciaran Murtagh, Joe Parham, and Tobi Wilson	Aurelie Charbonnier	June 23, 2016	August 11, 2016	GB435	1.45
149	33	"The Roots"	Nathan Auerbach, Daniel Berg, Ben Bocquelet, Joe Parham, and Tobi Wilson	Yani Ouabdesselam	August 15, 2016	September 5, 2016	GB432	1.08
150	34	"The Blame"	Nathan Auerbach, Daniel Berg, Ben Bocquelet, Louise Coats, Guillaume Cassuto, Joe Parham, and Tobi Wilson	Adrian Maganza	August 16, 2016	September 12, 2016	GB434	1.43
151	35	"The Slap"	Ben Bocquelet, Joe Markham, Joe Parham, John Sheerman, and Tobi Wilson	Wandrille Maunoury	August 17, 2016	September 19, 2016	GB439	1.46
152	36	"The Detective"	Nathan Auerbach, Daniel Berg, Ben Bocquelet, Joe Parham, and Tobi Wilson	Wandrille Maunoury	August 18, 2016	October 25, 2016	GB437	1.11
153	37	"The Fury"	Nathan Auerbach, Daniel Berg, Ben Bocquelet, Guillaume Cassuto, Louise Coats, Mic Graves, Joe Parham, and Tobi Wilson	Adrian Maganza	August 19, 2016	September 28, 2016	GB430	1.28
154	38	"The Compilation"	Rikke Asbjoern, Ben Bocquelet, James Hamilton, James Huntrods, Joe Markham, John Sheerman, and Tobi Wilson	Oliver Hamilton and Yani Ouabdesselam	August 25, 2016	October 18, 2016	GB440	1.17
155	39	"The Scam"	Nathan Auerbach, Daniel Berg, Ben Bocquelet, Guillaume Cassuto, Joe Parham, and Tobi Wilson	Adrian Maganza	October 27, 2016	May 15, 2016 (France and Asia); August 9, 2016 (Canada)	GB426	1.14
156	40	"The Disaster (Part 1)"	Ben Bocquelet, Andrew Jones, Ciaran Murtagh, Joe Parham, and Tobi Wilson	Aurelie Charbonnier and Adrian Maganza	September 5, 2016	November 11, 2016	GB438	1.19

=== Season 5 (2016–17) ===
No. overall	No. in season	Title	Directed by	Written by	Storyboarded by	Original air date	U.K. air date	Prod. code	US viewers (millions)
157	1	"The Rerun (Part 2)"	Mic Graves	Nathan Auerbach, Daniel Berg, Ben Bocquelet, Joe Parham, and Tobi Wilson	Adrian Maganza and Aurelie Charbonnier	September 5, 2016	November 5, 2016	GB501	1.19
158	2	"The Stories"	Antoine Perez	Ben Bocquelet, Andrew Jones, Ciaran Murtagh, Joe Parham, and Tobi Wilson	Aurelie Charbonnier	September 1, 2016	November 4, 2016	GB502	1.03
159	3	"The Guy"	Mic Graves	Ben Bocquelet, Joe Markham, Joe Parham, John Sheerman, and Tobi Wilson	Wandrille Maunoury	September 8, 2016	November 3, 2016	GB504	1.21
160	4	"The Boredom"	Antoine Perez	Nathan Auerbach, Daniel Berg, Ben Bocquelet, Louise Coats, James Hamilton, James Huntrods, Joe Markham, Joe Parham, Jessica Ransom, and Tobi Wilson	Adrian Maganza	September 15, 2016	November 1, 2016	GB506	0.95
161	5	"The Vision"	Antoine Perez	Ben Bocquelet, Joe Markham, Joe Parham, Jessica Ransom, John Sheerman, and Tobi Wilson	Wandrille Maunoury	October 6, 2016	November 5, 2016	GB511	1.09
162	6	"The Choices"	Mic Graves	Nathan Auerbach, Daniel Berg, Ben Bocquelet, Jon Foster, James Lamont, Joe Parham, and Tobi Wilson	Adrian Maganza	October 13, 2016	November 7, 2016	GB503	1.15
163	7	"The Code"	Mic Graves	Ben Bocquelet, Andrew Jones, Joe Markham, Ciaran Murtagh, Joe Parham, Jessica Ransom, John Sheerman, and Tobi Wilson	Cedric Guarneri	October 20, 2016	November 2, 2016	GB507	1.14
164	8	"The Test"	Antoine Perez	Nathan Auerbach, Daniel Berg, Ben Bocquelet, Joe Markham, Joe Parham, Jessica Ransom, John Sheerman, and Tobi Wilson	Aurelie Carbonnier, Oliver Hamilton, and Adrian Maganza	November 3, 2016	November 9, 2016	GB505	1.20
165	9	"The Slide"	Mic Graves	Ben Bocquelet, James Hamilton, James Huntrods, Joe Parham, and Tobi Wilson	Richard Méril	November 10, 2016	May 3, 2017	GB508	1.07
166	10	"The Loophole"	Antoine Perez	Ben Bocquelet, James Hamilton, James Huntrods, Joe Markham, Joe Parham, and Tobi Wilson	Richard Méril	November 17, 2016	February 5, 2017	GB512	1.10
167	11	"The Copycats"	Mic Graves	Ben Bocquelet, James Hamilton, James Huntrods, Joe Markham, and Tobi Wilson	Oliver Hamilton	February 6, 2017	May 9, 2017	GB517	1.01
168	12	"The Potato"	Mic Graves	Mic Graves, Andrew Jones, Joe Markham, Ciaran Murtagh, Jessica Ransom, and Tobi Wilson	Yani Ouabdesselam	February 7, 2017	May 3, 2017	GB519	0.96
169	13	"The Fuss"	Antoine Perez	Ben Bocquelet, James Hamilton, James Huntrods, Joe Markham, Joe Parham, and Tobi Wilson	Oliver Hamilton	February 8, 2017	May 1, 2017	GB513	0.91
170	14	"The Outside"	Mic Graves	Ben Bocquelet, Mic Graves, James Hamilton, James Huntrods, Joe Markham, Jessica Ransom, and Tobi Wilson	Wandrille Maunoury	February 9, 2017	May 8, 2017	GB518	1.07
171	15	"The Vase"	Mic Graves	Ben Bocquelet, Mic Graves, James Hamilton, James Huntrods, Joe Markham, Joe Parham, Jessica Ransom, and Tobi Wilson	Richard Méril	February 13, 2017	May 2, 2017	GB515	1.08
172	16	"The Matchmaker"	Antoine Perez	Ben Bocquelet, Mic Graves, James Hamilton, Andrew Jones, Joe Markham, Ciaran Murtagh, Joe Parham, and Tobi Wilson	Oliver Hamilton	February 14, 2017	March 2, 2017	GB522	1.03
173	17	"The Box"	Mic Graves	Ben Bocquelet, Mic Graves, James Hamilton, Brydie Lee-Kennedy, Joe Markham, Joe Parham, and Tobi Wilson	Wandrille Maunoury	February 15, 2017	September 4, 2017	GB521	1.01
174	18	"The Console"	Antoine Perez	Nathan Auerbach, Daniel Berg, Ben Bocquelet, Joe Markham, Joe Parham, and Tobi Wilson	Aurelie Charbonnier and Adrian Maganza	February 16, 2017	May 5, 2017	GB510	0.97
175	19	"The Ollie"	Antoine Perez and Simon Landrein	Ben Bocquelet, James Hamilton, James Huntrods, Simon Landrein, Joe Markham, Timothy Mills, Joe Parham, and Tobi Wilson	Yani Ouabdesselam	February 20, 2017	May 11, 2017	GB516	1.30
176	20	"The Catfish"	Antoine Perez	Ben Bocquelet, James Hamilton, James Huntrods, Joe Markham, Joe Parham, Jessica Ransom, and Tobi Wilson	Richard Méril	February 21, 2017	May 10, 2017	GB520	1.14
177	21	"The Cycle"	Antoine Perez	Ben Bocquelet, James Hamilton, Andrew Jones, Ciaran Murtagh, Joe Parham, Jessica Ransom, and Tobi Wilson	Yani Ouabdesselam	February 22, 2017	May 11, 2017	GB523	1.14
178	22	"The Stars"	Mic Graves	Ben Bocquelet, Mic Graves, Andrew Jones, Joe Markham, Ciaran Murtagh, Joe Parham, and Tobi Wilson	Richard Méril	February 23, 2017	September 4, 2017	GB524	0.92
179	23	"The Grades"	Antoine Perez	Ben Bocquelet, James Hamilton, Andrew Jones, Ciaran Murtagh, Joe Parham, and Tobi Wilson	Wandrille Maunoury	February 27, 2017	April 22, 2017	GB525	0.85
180	24	"The Diet"	Mic Graves	Ben Bocquelet, Mic Graves, James Hamilton, James Huntrods, Joe Markham, Joe Parham, Jessica Ransom, and Tobi Wilson	Bianca Ansems and Adrian Maganza	February 28, 2017	April 13, 2017	GB526	0.83
181	25	"The Ex"	Mic Graves	Ben Bocquelet, Mic Graves, James Hamilton, Joe Markham, Tom Neenan, Joe Parham, Jon Purkis, and Tobi Wilson	Oliver Hamilton	March 1, 2017	May 1, 2017	GB527	0.96
182	26	"The Sorcerer"	Antoine Perez	Jack Bernhardt, Ben Bocquelet, Joe Markham, Joe Parham, and Tobi Wilson	Wandrille Maunoury	March 2, 2017	May 4, 2017	GB528	1.16
183	27	"The Menu"	Mic Graves	Ben Bocquelet, James Hamilton, James Huntrods, and Tobi Wilson	Wandrille Maunoury	March 6, 2017	September 20, 2017	GB529	0.98
184	28	"The Uncle"	Antoine Perez	Jack Bernhardt, Ben Bocquelet, Mic Graves, James Hamilton, James Huntrods, Joe Markham, and Tobi Wilson	Oliver Hamilton	March 7, 2017	May 10, 2017	GB531	0.80
185	29	"The Weirdo"	Antoine Perez	Ben Bocquelet, Mic Graves, James Hamilton, Andrew Jones, Joe Markham, Ciaran Murtagh, Joe Parham, Jessica Ransom, and Tobi Wilson	Richard Méril	March 8, 2017	May 14, 2017	GB514	0.87
186	30	"The Heist"	Mic Graves	Ben Bocquelet, Mic Graves, James Hamilton, Joe Markham, Tom Neenan, Jon Purkis, and Tobi Wilson	Richard Méril	March 9, 2017	May 26, 2017	GB532	0.97
187	31	"The Singing"	Antoine Perez	Ben Bocquelet, Mic Graves, James Hamilton, Joe Markham, Tom Neenan, Jon Purkis, and Tobi Wilson	Bianca Ansems, Oliver Hamilton, and Adrian Maganza	September 1, 2017	April 20, 2018	GB540	0.92
188	32	"The Best"	Antoine Perez	Ben Bocquelet, James Hamilton, James Huntrods, Joe Markham, Joe Parham, Jessica Ransom, and Tobi Wilson	Kenneth Ladekjaer	September 8, 2017	October 25, 2017	GB536	0.78
189	33	"The Worst"	Mic Graves	Ben Bocquelet, James Hamilton, Joe Markham, Tom Neenan, Jon Purkis, Jessica Ransom, and Tobi Wilson	Oliver Hamilton and Wandrille Maunoury	September 15, 2017	October 25, 2017	GB539	0.88
190	34	"The Deal"	Mic Graves	Ben Bocquelet, Mic Graves, James Hamilton, Bec Hill, Joe Markham, Jessica Ransom, and Jonny Leigh-Wright	Chloé Nicolay	September 22, 2017	April 6, 2018	GB530	0.81
191	35	"The Petals"	Mic Graves	Ben Bocquelet, James Hamilton, James Huntrods, Joe Markham, Jessica Ransom, and Tobi Wilson	Kenneth Ladekjaer	September 29, 2017	October 24, 2017	GB533	0.87
192	36	"The Puppets"	Mic Graves, Joseph Pelling, and Becky Sloan	Ben Bocquelet, Louise Coats, James Hamilton, Tom Neenan, Joseph Pelling, Jon Purkis, Becky Sloan, and Tobi Wilson	Adrian Maganza	October 6, 2017	April 27, 2018	GB537	0.86
193	37	"The Nuisance"	Mic Graves	Jack Bernhardt, Ben Bocquelet, James Hamilton, Joe Markham, Jessica Ransom, and Tobi Wilson	Chloé Nicolay	October 13, 2017	October 23, 2017	GB534	0.91
194	38	"The Line"	Mic Graves	Mic Graves, James Hamilton, James Huntrods, Brydie Lee-Kennedy, Joe Markham, Jessica Ransom, and Tobi Wilson	Chloé Nicolay	October 20, 2017	April 13, 2018	GB538	0.88
195	39	"The List"	Antoine Perez	Ben Bocquelet, James Hamilton, Brydie Lee-Kennedy, Joe Markham, Joe Parham, Jessica Ransom, and Tobi Wilson	Richard Méril	November 3, 2017	March 30, 2018	GB535	0.99
196	40	"The News"	Antoine Perez	Nathan Auerbach, Daniel Berg, Ben Bocquelet, Joe Parham, and Tobi Wilson	Oliver Hamilton	November 10, 2017	September 15, 2017	GB509	0.91

=== Season 6 (2018–19) ===
No. overall	No. in season	Title	Directed by	Written by	Storyboarded by	Original air date	U.K. air date	Prod. code	US viewers (millions)
197	1	"The Rival"	Mic Graves	Ben Bocquelet, James Hamilton, Joe Markham, Joe Parham, Jon Purkis, and Tobi Wilson	Adrian Maganza	January 5, 2018	May 4, 2018	GB603	1.23
198	2	"The Lady"	Mic Graves	Ben Bocquelet, James Hamilton, Joe Markham, and Tobi Wilson	Chloé Nicolay	January 5, 2018	May 1, 2018	GB602	1.23
199	3	"The Sucker"	Antoine Perez	Jack Bernhardt, Ben Bocquelet, James Hamilton, Joe Markham, Joe Parham, and Tobi Wilson	Richard Méril	January 12, 2018	May 2, 2018	GB605	0.91
200	4	"The Vegging"	Antoine Perez	Ben Bocquelet, James Hamilton, Andrew Jones, Joe Markham, Ciaran Murtagh, Tom Neenan, Joe Parham, and Tobi Wilson	Wandrille Maunoury	January 15, 2018	May 28, 2018	GB607	1.14
201	5	"The One"	Mic Graves	Ben Bocquelet, James Hamilton, Andrew Jones, Joe Markham, Ciaran Murtagh, and Tobi Wilson	Chloé Nicolay	January 19, 2018	May 7, 2018	GB606	0.79
202	6	"The Father"	Mic Graves	Jack Bernhardt, Ben Bocquelet, James Hamilton, Joe Markham, and Tobi Wilson	Aurelie Charbonnier	January 26, 2018	May 8, 2018	GB609	0.83
203	7	"The Cringe"	Mic Graves & Kristian Andrews	Ben Bocquelet, James Hamilton, Andrew Jones, Joe Markham, Ciaran Murtagh, Joe Parham, and Tobi Wilson	Richard Méril	February 2, 2018	May 10, 2018	GB608	0.68
204	8	"The Cage"	Antoine Perez	Ben Bocquelet, James Hamilton, Joe Markham, and Tobi Wilson	Aurelie Charbonnier	February 9, 2018 (Note: This episode was first released online on December 8, 2017.)	May 3, 2018	GB604	0.81
205	9	"The Faith"	Antoine Perez	Jack Bernhardt, Ben Bocquelet, Cariad Lloyd, Joe Markham, and Tobi Wilson	Richard Méril	February 23, 2018	May 30, 2018	GB611	0.87
206	10	"The Candidate"	Antoine Perez	Jack Bernhardt, Ben Bocquelet, James Hamilton, Joe Markham, Tom Neenan, Joe Parham, Jon Purkis, Jess Ransom, and Tobi Wilson	Richard Méril	March 2, 2018	May 31, 2018	GB613	1.00
207	11	"The Anybody"	Mic Graves	Mic Graves, James Hamilton, Joe Markham, Tom Neenan, Joe Parham, Jon Purkis, and Jess Ransom	Max Loubaresse	March 9, 2018	September 3, 2018	GB614	0.87
208	12	"The Pact"	Antoine Perez	Jack Bernhardt, Ben Bocquelet, James Hamilton, Joe Markham, Joe Parham, Eddie Robson, and Tobi Wilson	Aurelie Charbonnier	April 9, 2018	May 9, 2018	GB612	0.85
209	13	"The Neighbor"	Mic Graves	Ben Bocquelet, Mic Graves, James Hamilton, Andrew Jones, Joe Markham, Ciaran Murtagh, Joe Parham, and Tobi Wilson	Bianca Ansems	April 13, 2018	May 29, 2018	GB610	0.84
210	14	"The Shippening"	Antoine Perez	Ben Bocquelet, James Hamilton, Joe Markham, Tom Neenan, Joe Parham, and Jon Purkis	Aurelie Charbonnier	April 20, 2018	September 4, 2018	GB616	0.86
211	15	"The Brain"	Mic Graves	Jack Bernhardt, Ben Bocquelet, Mic Graves, Natasha Hodgson, Joe Markham, Joe Parham, and Tobi Wilson	Zhihuang Dong	June 18, 2018 (Note: This episode was first released online on June 15, 2018.)	September 5, 2018	GB615	0.49
212	16	"The Parents"	Antoine Perez	Gemma Arrowsmith, Ben Bocquelet, James Hamilton, Joe Markham, and Tobi Wilson	Aurelie Charbonnier	June 18, 2018	September 10, 2018	GB625	0.52
213	17	"The Founder"	Mic Graves	Gemma Arrowsmith, Mic Graves, James Hamilton, Joe Markham, and Tobi Wilson	Richard Méril	June 18, 2018	September 11, 2018	GB619	0.56
214	18	"The Schooling"	Antoine Perez	Gemma Arrowsmith, Ben Bocquelet, Mic Graves, James Hamilton, Joe Markham, and Joe Parham	Ben Marsaud	June 18, 2018	September 12, 2018	GB618	0.71
215	19	"The Intelligence"	Mic Graves	Gemma Arrowsmith, Mic Graves, James Hamilton, Joe Markham (Note: Joe Markham's name is credited twice by mistake.), and Tobi Wilson	Aurelie Charbonnier	June 18, 2018	September 13, 2018	GB621	0.68
216	20	"The Potion"	Mic Graves	Jack Bernhardt, Ben Bocquelet, Sophie Duker, Mic Graves, Joe Markham, and Tobi Wilson	Bianca Ansems	July 16, 2018 (Note: This episode was first released online on July 12, 2018.)	September 14, 2018	GB622	0.42
217	21	"The Spinoffs"	Antoine Perez	Ben Bocquelet, Mic Graves, James Hamilton, Natasha Hodgson, Joe Markham, and Tobi Wilson	Max Loubaresse	July 16, 2018	May 1, 2019	GB620	0.55
218	22	"The Transformation"	Antoine Perez & Julian Glander	Ben Bocquelet, Andrew Jones, Joe Markham, Ciaran Murtagh, Joe Parham, Tobi Wilson, and Lucien Young	Richard Meril	July 16, 2018	May 2, 2019	GB626	0.65
219	23	"The Understanding"	Mic Graves	Jack Bernhardt, Mic Graves, James Hamilton, Tony Hull, Joe Markham, Joe Parham, and Tobi Wilson	Bianca Ansems	July 16, 2018	May 7, 2019	GB629	0.69
220	24	"The Ad"	Antoine Perez	Ben Bocquelet, Sophie Duker, James Hamilton, Joe Markham, Tobi Wilson, and Lucien Young	Ben Marsaud	July 16, 2018	May 3, 2019	GB633	0.69
221	25	"The Ghouls"	Antoine Perez	Ben Bocquelet, Mic Graves, Tony Hull, Joe Markham, Richard Overall, Jess Ransom, Paul Rice, and Tobi Wilson	Oliver Hamilton	October 19, 2018 (Note: This episode was first released online on October 1, 2018.)	September 13, 2019	GB643	0.68
222	26	"The Stink"	Mic Graves	Jack Bernhardt, Mic Graves, James Hamilton, Joe Markham, Joe Parham, and Tobi Wilson	Bianca Ansems	November 5, 2018 (Note: This episode was accidentally leaked online on April 28, 2018.)	September 6, 2018	GB617	0.63
223	27	"The Awareness"	Antoine Perez	Jack Bernhardt, Mic Graves, Joe Markham, Tom Neenan, Joe Parham, and Tobi Wilson	Zhihuang Dong	November 6, 2018	September 7, 2018	GB624	0.60
224	28	"The Slip"	Mic Graves	Mic Graves, Joe Markham, Jess Ransom, and Tobi Wilson	Aurelie Charbonnier	November 7, 2018	May 6, 2019	GB634	0.57
225	29	"The Drama"	Mic Graves	Gemma Arrowsmith, Ben Bocquelet, James Hamilton, Joe Markham, Tobi Wilson, and Lucien Young	Aurelie Charbonnier	November 8, 2018	May 27, 2019	GB630	0.58
226	30	"The Buddy"	Antoine Perez	Jack Bernhardt, Ben Bocquelet, Natasha Hodgson, Joe Markham, Joe Parham, and Tobi Wilson	Richard Meril	November 9, 2018	TBA	GB623	0.66
227	31	"The Possession"	Mic Graves	Mic Graves, Tony Hull, and Joe Markham	Zhihuang Dong	April 15, 2019	September 4, 2019	GB642	0.44
228	32	"The Master"	Mic Graves	Jack Bernhardt, Ben Bocquelet, Mic Graves, Natasha Hodgson, Tony Hull, Joe Markham, Tobi Wilson, and Lucien Young	Bianca Ansems	April 22, 2019	TBA	GB632	0.53
229	33	"The Silence"	Antoine Perez	Ben Bocquelet, Joe Markham, Jess Ransom, and Tobi Wilson	Aurelie Charbonnier	April 29, 2019 (Note: This episode was first released online on December 13, 2018.)	May 28, 2019	GB637	0.56
230	34	"The Future"	Mic Graves	Ben Bocquelet, James Hamilton, Joe Markham, Jon Purkis, and Tobi Wilson	Richard Meril	May 6, 2019 (Note: This episode was first released online on May 3, 2019.)	May 29, 2019	GB601	0.55
231	35	"The Wish"	Mic Graves	Gemma Arrowsmith, Mic Graves, James Hamilton, Tony Hull, and Joe Markham	Max Loubaresse	May 13, 2019	May 30, 2019	GB627	0.52
232	36	"The Factory"	Mic Graves	Jack Bernhardt, Ben Bocquelet, James Hamilton, Joe Markham, and Tobi Wilson	Max Loubaresse	May 20, 2019	May 31, 2019	GB631	0.46
233	37	"The Agent"	Mic Graves	Mic Graves, Tony Hull, and Richard Overall	Zhihuang Dong	May 27, 2019	September 9, 2019	GB636	0.51
234	38	"The Web"	Antoine Perez	Ben Bocquelet, Mic Graves, Joe Markham, Richard Overall, Joe Parham, Jess Ransom, and Tobi Wilson	Aurelie Charbonnier	June 3, 2019 (Note: This episode was first released online on May 31, 2019.)	September 11, 2019	GB641	0.44
235	39	"The Mess"	Mic Graves	Ben Bocquelet, Joe Markham, Jess Ransom, Tobi Wilson, and Lucien Young	Max Loubaresse	June 10, 2019	September 3, 2019	GB640	0.50
236	40	"The Heart"	Antoine Perez	Ben Bocquelet, Joe Markham, Jess Ransom, and Tobi Wilson,	Bianca Ansems	June 10, 2019	September 5, 2019	GB635	0.54
237	41	"The Revolt"	Mic Graves	Ben Bocquelet, Mic Graves, James Hamilton, Natasha Hodgson, Tony Hull, Joe Markham, Joe Parham, and Tobi Wilson	Zhihuang Dong	June 17, 2019	September 2, 2019	GB628	0.47
238	42	"The Decisions"	Mic Graves	Mic Graves, Tony Hull, Joe Markham, Richard Overall, Tobi Wilson, and Lucien Young	Adrian Maganza	June 17, 2019	September 10, 2019	GB638	0.51
239	43	"The BFFs"	Antoine Perez	Ben Bocquelet, Joe Parham, Jess Ransom, and Tobi Wilson	Bianca Ansems	June 24, 2019	September 6, 2019	GB639	0.46
240	44	"The Inquisition"	Mic Graves	Ben Bocquelet, Mic Graves, Joe Markham, Richard Overall, Joe Parham, Jess Ransom, and Tobi Wilson	Adrian Maganza	June 24, 2019	September 12, 2019	GB644	0.51

=== Miniseries ===
==== Darwin's Yearbook (2019) ====
A six-episode special called Darwin's Yearbook aired on Cartoon Network in December 2019. The miniseries features Darwin attempting to complete Elmore Junior High's yearbook by examining who he thinks should fill up the best spot. The miniseries is essentially a collection of clip show episodes.

No. in series	Title	U.S. air date	U.K. air date	Prod. code	U.S. viewers (millions)
1	"Banana Joe"	December 14, 2019 (Note: This episode was first aired in France on December 7, 2019.)	December 2, 2019	701	0.54
2	"Clayton"	December 14, 2019	December 2, 2019	702	0.56
3	"Carrie"	December 21, 2019	December 3, 2019	703	0.62
4	"Alan"	December 21, 2019 (Note: This episode was first aired in France on December 8, 2019.)	December 4, 2019	704	0.65
5	"Sarah"	December 28, 2019	December 5, 2019	705	0.51
6	"Teachers"	December 28, 2019	December 6, 2019	706	0.52

==== The Gumball Chronicles (2020–21) ====
An eight-episode miniseries called The Gumball Chronicles premiered on Cartoon Network on October 5, 2020. Though primarily a clip show with scenes from previous episodes, the miniseries features some new content. Within the miniseries, there is a 4-part special titled Vote Gumball themed around the 2020 United States presidential election.

Every episode is written and directed by Richard Overall.

No. in series	Title	Written by	Storyboarded by	U.S. air date	U.K. air date	Prod. code	U.S. viewers (millions)
1	"The Curse of Elmore"	Nathan Auerbach, Daniel Berg, Ben Bocquelet, Guillaume Cassuto, Louise Coats, Ben Cottam, Jon Foster, Mic Graves, James Hamilton, James Huntrods, Bec Hill, Tony Hull, Kieran Hodgson, James Lamont, Joe Markham, Tom Meltzer, Richard Overall, Joe Parham, Paul Rice, Jess Ransom, Sam Ward, Tobi Wilson, and Jonny Leigh Wright	Bianca Ansems, Aurelie Charbonnier, Akis Dimitrakopoulos, Oliver Hamilton, Andy Kelly, William Laborie, Kenneth Ladekjaer, Wandrille Maunoury, Ben Marsaud, Dave Needham, Chloé Nicolay, and Tom Parkinson	October 5, 2020	March 3, 2021	801	0.32
2	"Vote Gumball… and Penny?"	Nathan Auerbach, Daniel Berg, Jack Bernardt, Ben Bocquelet, Jon Brittain, Guillaume Cassuto, Louise Coats, Tom Crowley, Mark Evans, Jon Foster, Chris Garbutt, Mic Graves, James Huntrods, Andrew Jones, James Hamilton, Brydie Lee-Kennedy, Joe Markham, Tim Mills, Ciaran Murtagh, Tom Neenan, Joe Parham, Paul Rice, Jon Purkis, Jess Ransom, John Sheerman, Sam Ward, and Tobi Wilson	Bianca Ansems, Aurelie Charbonnier, Akis Dimitrakopoulos, George Gendi, Cedric Guarneri, Oliver Hamilton, Sebastien Harry, Chuck Klein, Kenneth Ladekjaer, Rob Latimer, and Max Loubaresse	November 2, 2020 (Note: This episode was first released online on October 30, 2020.)	March 4, 2021	802	0.39
3	"Vote Gumball… and Leslie?"	Gemma Arrowsmith, Nathan Auerbach, Daniel Berg, Jack Bernhardt, Ben Bocquelet, Louise Coats, Mark Evans, Jon Foster, Mic Graves, James Hamilton, James Huntrods, Tony Hull, Andrew Jones, James Lamont, Brydie Lee-Kennedy, Joe Markham, Ciaran Murtagh, Tom Neenan, Richard Overall, Joe Parham, Jon Purkis, Jess Ransom, Tobi Wilson, and Lucien Young	Aurelie Charbonnier, Zhihuang Dong, Chuck Klein, William Laborie, Kenneth Ladekjaer, Adrian Maganza, Ben Marsaud, Richard Méril, and Chloé Nicolay	November 2, 2020	March 5, 2021	803	0.33
4	"Vote Gumball… and Bobert?"	Tim Allsop, Nathan Auerbach, Daniel Berg, Jack Bernhardt, Ben Bocquelet, Jon Brittain, Louise Coats, Ben Cottam, Tom Crowley, Jon Foster, Mic Graves, James Hamilton, James Huntrods, Tony Hull, Moray Hunter, Natasha Hodgson, Kieran Hodgson, Andrew Jones, James Lamont, Simon Landrein, Joe Markham, Paul McKenna, Tom Meltzer, Tim Mills, Ciaran Murtagh, Tom Neenan, Richard Overall, Joe Parham, Jon Purkis, Jess Ransom, Howard Read, Sam Ward, Stewart Williams, and Tobi Wilson	Bianca Ansems, Aurelie Charbonnier, Akis Dimitrakopoulos, Zhihuang Dong, Jacques Gauthier, George Gendi, Oliver Hamilton, Andy Kelly, Chuck Klein, Rob Latimer, Wandrille Maunoury, Adrian Maganza, Ben Marsaud, Richard Méril, Chloé Nicolay, Yani Ouabdesselam, Charles Schneck, and Jean Texier	November 2, 2020	March 8, 2021	804	0.36
5	"Vote Gumball… and Anyone?"	Nathan Auerbach, Daniel Berg, Jack Bernhardt, Ben Bocquelet, Guillaume Cassuto, Louise Coats, Jon Foster, Mic Graves, James Hamilton, Tony Hull, Andrew Jones, James Lamont, Joe Markham, Ciaran Murtagh, Tom Neenan, Richard Overall, Joe Parham, Jess Ransom, John Sheerman, Sam Ward, Tobi Wilson, and Lucien Young	Bianca Ansems, Aurelie Charbonnier, Akis Dimitrakopoulos, George Gendi, Sebastian Hary, William Laborie, Wandrille Maunoury, Adrian Maganza, Richard Méril, and Yani Ouabdesselam	November 2, 2020	March 9, 2021	805	0.37
6	"Ancestor Act"	Tim Allsop, Gemma Arrowsmith, Nathan Auerbach, Daniel Berg, Jack Bernhardt, Ben Bocquelet, Guillaume Cassuto, Louise Coats, Jon Foster, Chris Garbutt, Mic Graves, James Hamilton, James Huntrods, Bec Hill, Tony Hull, Natasha Hodgson, James Lamont, Joe Markham, Tom Meltzer, Tim Mills, Tom Neenan, Tommy Panays, Joe Parham, Jon Purkis, Jess Ransom, John Sheerman, Sam Ward, Stewart Williams, Tobi Wilson, Jonny Leigh Wright, and Lucien Young	Bianca Ansems, Aurelie Charbonnier, Akis Dimitrakopoulos, Zhihuang Dong, George Gendi, Oliver Hamilton, Sebastian Hary, Chuck Klein, William Laborie, Rob Latimer, Max Loubaresse, Wandrille Maunoury, Adrian Maganza, Ben Marsaud, Richard Méril, Chloé Nicolay, Amandine Pécharman, and Jean Texier	November 21, 2020	March 10, 2021	806	0.30
7	"Mother's Day"	Gemma Arrowsmith, Nathan Auerbach, Daniel Berg, Jack Bernhardt, Ben Bocquelet, Andrew Brenner, Jon Brittain, Guillaume Cassuto, Louise Coats, Tom Crowley, Mark Evans, Jon Foster, Chris Garbutt, Mic Graves, James Hamilton, James Huntrods, Tony Hull, Natasha Hodgson, Andrew Jones, James Lamont, Joe Markham, Tim Mills, Ciaran Murtagh, Oliver Kindeberg, Tom Neenan, Richard Overall, Joe Parham, Jon Purkis, Jess Ransom, Tobi Wilson, Lucien Young, and Matt Zeqiri	Bianca Ansems, Aurelie Charbonnier, Akis Dimitrakopoulos, Zhihuang Dong, Céline Gobinet, Mic Graves, Oliver Hamilton, Sebastian Hary, Andy Kelly, William Laborie, Max Loubaresse, Wandrille Maunoury, Adrian Maganza, Ben Marsaud, Richard Méril, Yani Ouabdesselam, and Jean Texier	May 8, 2021	March 1, 2021	807	0.19
8	"Elmore's Most Wanted"	Tim Allsop, Nathan Auerbach, Daniel Berg, Yann Benedi, Jack Bernhardt, Ben Bocquelet, Jon Brittain, Guillaume Cassuto, Louise Coats, Ben Cottam, Tom Crowley, Jon Foster, Mic Graves, James Hamilton, Bec Hill, Tony Hull, Andrew Jones, James Lamont, Joe Markham, Tom Meltzer, Ciaran Murtagh, Tom Neenan, Richard Overall, Joe Parham, Antoine Perez, Paul Rice, Jon Purkis, Jess Ransom, Stewart Williams, Tobi Wilson, and Jonny Leigh Wright	Bianca Ansems, Aurelie Charbonnier, Akis Dimitrakopoulos, George Gendi, Oliver Hamilton, Andy Kelly, Chuck Klein, Wandrille Maunoury, Ben Marsaud, Richard Méril, Chloé Nicolay, and Jean Texier	June 20, 2021	March 2, 2021	808	0.28

== The Wonderfully Weird World of Gumball ==
=== Season 1 (2025) ===
No. overall	No. in season	Title	Written by	Storyboarded by	Hulu release date	U.K. air date	Prod. code
241	1	"The Burger"	Bryan Caselli, Jessica Combs, Matt Layzell, Todd Michael McClintock & Ben Bocquelet	Oliver Hamilton	July 28, 2025	6 October 2025	GB701
242	2	"The Assistant"	Bryan Caselli, Michele Cavin, Jessica Combs, Matt Layzell, Joe Markham, Todd Michael McClintock & Joe Parham	Aurelie Charbonnier	July 28, 2025	6 October 2025	GB702
243	3	"The Distance"	Bryan Caselli, Jessica Combs, Matt Layzell, Joe Markham, Todd Michael McClintock, Joe Parham & Ben Bocquelet	Melanie Lopez	July 28, 2025	6 October 2025	GB703
244	4	"The Thing"	Bryan Caselli, Michele Cavin, Jessica Combs, Matt Layzell, Joe Markham, Todd Michael McClintock & Joe Parham	Oliver Hamilton	July 28, 2025	6 October 2025	GB705
245	5	"The Butts"	Bryan Caselli, Jessica Combs, Matt Layzell, Joe Markham, Todd Michael McClintock, Joe Parham & Ben Bocquelet	Jeremy Abram Paoletti	July 28, 2025	7 October 2025	GB704
246	6	"The Traffic"	Bryan Caselli, Jessica Combs, Matt Layzell, Todd Michael McClintock & Ben Bocquelet	Aurelie Charbonnier	July 28, 2025	8 October 2025	GB711
247	7	"The Astrological"	Bryan Caselli, Michele Cavin, Jessica Combs, Matt Layzell, Joe Markham, Todd Michael McClintock & Joe Parham	Bianca Ansems	July 28, 2025	9 October 2025	GB707
248	8	"The Cheerleader"	Bryan Caselli, Jessica Combs, Matt Layzell, Todd Michael McClintock & Ben Bocquelet	Aurelie Charbonnier	July 28, 2025	10 October 2025	GB706
249	9	"The Boring"	Bryan Caselli, Michele Cavin, Jessica Combs, Matt Layzell & Todd Michael McClintock	Jeremy Abram Paoletti	July 28, 2025	13 October 2025	GB709
250	10	"The Teacher"	Bryan Caselli, Jessica Combs, Kate Davies, Matt Layzell, Todd Michael McClintock, Tobi Wilson & Ben Bocquelet	Aurelie Charbonnier	July 28, 2025	14 October 2025	GB717
251	11	"The App"	Bryan Caselli, Michele Cavin, Jessica Combs, Matt Layzell, Joe Markham, Todd Michael McClintock & Joe Parham	Bianca Ansems	July 28, 2025	15 October 2025	GB712
252	12	"The Entrance"	Bryan Caselli, Jessica Combs, Matt Layzell, Todd Michael McClintock & Ben Bocquelet	Aurelie Charbonnier	July 28, 2025	16 October 2025	GB723
253	13	"The Letter"	Bryan Caselli, Jessica Combs, Matt Layzell, Todd Michael McClintock & Ben Bocquelet	Melanie Lopez	July 28, 2025	20 October 2025	GB708
254	14	"The Gut"	Bryan Caselli, Michele Cavin, Jessica Combs, Matt Layzell, Joe Markham, Todd Michael McClintock, Joe Parham, Jessica Silcock, Naomi Smith & Tobi Wilson	Jawed Boudaoud	July 28, 2025	21 October 2025	GB715
255	15	"The Wrinkle"	Bryan Caselli, Todd Michael McClintock, Tobi Wilson & Ben Bocquelet	Jawed Boudaoud	July 28, 2025	22 October 2025	GB724
256	16	"The Gourmet"	Bryan Caselli, Michele Cavin, Jessica Combs, Todd Michael McClintock, James McNicholas & Tobi Wilson	Bianca Ansems	July 28, 2025	23 October 2025	GB716
257	17	"The Pool"	Bryan Caselli, Jessica Combs, Matt Layzell, Todd Michael McClintock, James McNicholas & Ben Bocquelet	Aurelie Charbonnier	July 28, 2025	27 October 2025	GB727
258	18	"The Portrait"	Bryan Caselli, Michele Cavin, Stephen M. Collins, Jessica Combs, Matt Layzell, Todd Michael McClintock & Joe Parham	Melanie Lopez	July 28, 2025	28 October 2025	GB710
259	19	"The Climb"	Bryan Caselli, Michele Cavin, Jessica Combs, Matt Layzell, Todd Michael McClintock & Tobi Wilson	Julien Thompson	July 28, 2025	29 October 2025	GB718
260	20	"The Amadain"	Bryan Caselli, Michele Cavin, Jessica Combs, Matt Layzell, Todd Michael McClintock & Ben Bocquelet	Bianca Ansems	July 28, 2025	30 October 2025	GB730

=== Season 2 (2025) ===
No. overall	No. in season	Title	Written by	Storyboarded by	Hulu release date	U.K. air date	Prod. code
261	1	"The Summoning"	Bryan Caselli, Michele Cavin, Jessica Combs, Matt Layzell, Todd Michael McClintock & Tobi Wilson	Julien Thompson	December 22, 2025	16 October 2026	GB725
262	2	"The Unfollow"	Bryan Caselli, Jessica Combs, Kate Davies, Matt Layzell, Todd Michael McClintock & Ben Bocquelet	Jawed Boudaoud	December 22, 2025	2 February 2026	GB731
263	3	"The Promposal"	Bryan Caselli, Jessica Combs, Matt Layzell, Todd Michael McClintock, Jessica Silcock, Naomi Smith, Tobi Wilson & Ben Bocquelet	Jawed Boudaoud	December 22, 2025	3 February 2026	GB720
264	4	"The Trumpet"	George Gendi, Matt Layzell & Michele Cavin	Melanie Lopez	December 22, 2025	4 February 2026	GB714
265	5	"The Synthesis"	Shane McCarthy & Ben Bocquelet	Matt Layzell	December 22, 2025	5 February 2026	GB739
266	6	"The Cheapmas"	Bryan Caselli, Ruby Clyde, Jessica Combs, Kate Davies, Matt Layzell, Todd Michael McClintock, Rachel WD & Ben Bocquelet	Melanie Lopez	December 22, 2025	TBA	GB733
267	7	"The Score"	Bryan Caselli, Ruby Clyde, Jessica Combs, Kate Davies, Matt Layzell, Todd Michael McClintock, Rachel WD & Ben Bocquelet	Jawed Boudaoud	December 22, 2025	6 February 2026	GB728
268	8	"The Diary"	Bryan Caselli, Michele Cavin, Jessica Combs, Matt Layzell & Todd Michael McClintock	Bianca Ansems	December 22, 2025	9 February 2026	GB726
269	9	"The Punishment"	Ruby Clyde, Jessica Combs, Matt Layzell, Rachel WD, Tobi Wilson & Ben Bocquelet	Aurelie Charbonnier	December 22, 2025	10 February 2026	GB732
270	10	"The Roast"	Bryan Caselli, Ruby Clyde, Jessica Combs, Kate Davies, Matt Layzell, Todd Michael McClintock, Rachel WD, Tobi Wilson & Ben Bocquelet	Julien Thompson	December 22, 2025	11 February 2026	GB729
271	11	"The Survivalists"	George Gendi, Tobi Wilson & Ben Bocquelet	Melanie Lopez	December 22, 2025	TBA	GB719
272	12	"The Labels"	Bryan Caselli, Ruby Clyde, Jessica Combs, Matt Layzell, Todd Michael McClintock, Rachel WD, Tobi Wilson & Ben Bocquelet	Julien Thompson	December 22, 2025	TBA	GB734
273	13	"The Fools"	Bryan Caselli, Michele Cavin, Ruby Clyde, Jessica Combs, Kate Davies, Matt Layzell, Todd Michael McClintock & Rachel WD	Jawed Boudaoud	December 22, 2025	TBA	GB736
274	14	"The Homework"	Bryan Caselli, Jessica Combs, Matt Layzell, Todd Michael McClintock & Ben Bocquelet	Julien Thompson	December 22, 2025	TBA	GB722
275	15	"The Sonder"	Bryan Caselli, Michele Cavin, Ruby Clyde, Jessica Combs, Kate Davies, Matt Layzell, Todd Michael McClintock & Rachel WD	Matt Layzell	December 22, 2025	TBA	GB740
276	16	"The Mister"	Bryan Caselli, Michele Cavin, Ruby Clyde, Jessica Combs, Matt Layzell, Todd Michael McClintock, Rachel WD & Tobi Wilson	Bianca Ansems	December 22, 2025	TBA	GB738
277	17	"The Tracking"	Ruby Clyde, Rachel WD & Ben Bocquelet	Matt Layzell	December 22, 2025	TBA	GB741
278	18	"The Pants"	Michele Cavin, Ruby Clyde, Jessica Combs, Kate Davies & Rachel WD	Melanie Lopez	December 22, 2025	TBA	GB737
279	19	"The Necroprancer"	Bryan Caselli, Jessica Combs, Matt Layzell, Shane McCarthy, Todd Michael McClintock, Tobi Wilson & Ben Bocquelet	Bianca Ansems	December 22, 2025	TBA	GB735
280	20	"The Rewrite"	Ruby Clyde, Rachel WD & Ben Bocquelet	Oliver Hamilton	December 22, 2025	2 February 2026	GB742
