= The Amazing World of Gumball season 6 =

The Amazing World of Gumball
- Season 6
- Cover art for digital download for the first half
- Showrunner: Ben Bocquelet
- No. of episodes: 44

Release
- Original network: Cartoon Network
- Original release: January 5, 2018 – June 24, 2019

Season chronology
- ← Previous; Season 5 Next → The Wonderfully Weird World of Gumball

The sixth and final season of the British-American animated television sitcom The Amazing World of Gumball, created by Ben Bocquelet, premiered on Cartoon Network in the United States on January 5, 2018, and was produced by Cartoon Network Development Studio Europe. The series focuses on the misadventures of Gumball Watterson, a blue 12-year-old cat, along with his adopted brother, Darwin, a goldfish. Together, they cause mischief among their family, as well as with the wide array of students at Elmore Junior High, where they attend middle school. Unlike the previous seasons of the show, this season has 44 episodes, making it the longest season of the series. It is also the final season of the original run of the series and the last aired on Cartoon Network in the United States, with the revival series The Wonderfully Weird World of Gumball premiering on Hulu in the U.S. in 2025.

== Development ==
=== Production ===
On June 22, 2016, Cartoon Network renewed the series for a sixth season.

This is the final season where Donielle T. Hansley Jr. voices Darwin due to puberty. He voices Darwin until being replaced by Christian J. Simon in "The Anybody" when Darwin clears his throat. This is also the only season for Simon as well as the final season for Nicholas Cantu (voice of Gumball) and Kyla Kowalewski (voice of Anais). Season 6 episodes such as "The Cringe" further expanded the show's satirical examination of modern youth culture and awkward social interactions.

This is the final acting roles of Shane Rimmer (voice of Louie) and Gillian Hanna (voice of Betty) before their deaths on March 29, 2019, and August 18, 2019, respectively.

The sixth season production began on July 13, 2017, and ended on October 24, 2018.

On October 7, 2018, series creator Ben Bocquelet retweeted a tweet saying that the sixth season may be the final season, but further tweets and sources clarified that there could still be more seasons. On June 15, 2023, it was confirmed at the Annecy International Animation Film Festival that a seventh season was in production. It was released in 2025, as a sequel series titled The Wonderfully Weird World of Gumball.

This is also the final season to have involvement from the directors Mic Graves and Antoine Perez. They were replaced by Luke Allen and James Lancett for the revival.

== Episodes ==
No. overall	No. in season	Title	Directed by	Written by	Storyboarded by	Original air date	U.K. air date	Prod. code	US viewers (millions)
197	1	"The Rival"	Mic Graves	Ben Bocquelet, James Hamilton, Joe Markham, Joe Parham, Jon Purkis, and Tobi Wilson	Adrian Maganza	January 5, 2018	May 4, 2018	GB603	1.23
Back in time to when Anais is a newborn baby, Gumball and Darwin are terrified of her sinister and evil nature of trying to get the boys in trouble and killed. They decide to ship her away, but her box ends up getting picked up by the garbage men, forcing the boys to go and rescue her.
198	2	"The Lady"	Mic Graves	Ben Bocquelet, James Hamilton, Joe Markham, and Tobi Wilson	Chloé Nicolay	January 5, 2018	May 1, 2018	GB602	1.23
Gumball and Darwin become suspicious of Richard's connection to a woman named Samantha who is always hanging out with a group of old ladies. When they realize that Richard and Samantha are one and the same, they set out to right a wrong.
199	3	"The Sucker"	Antoine Perez	Jack Bernhardt, Ben Bocquelet, James Hamilton, Joe Markham, Joe Parham, and Tobi Wilson	Richard Méril	January 12, 2018	May 2, 2018	GB605	0.91
Darwin ends up in detention with Julius Oppenheimer Jr. (the 1920s cartoon-inspired, bomb-head bully first seen on "The Lesson") for trying to fix Julius' vandalism, and Julius cons Darwin into being part of his gang, but soon regrets it when everything Darwin does goes wrong.
200	4	"The Vegging"	Antoine Perez	Ben Bocquelet, James Hamilton, Andrew Jones, Joe Markham, Ciaran Murtagh, Tom Neenan, Joe Parham, and Tobi Wilson	Wandrille Maunoury	January 15, 2018	May 28, 2018	GB607	1.14
Gumball and Darwin decide to spend the whole day vegging out and watch TV. To do so, they drown out all the weird happenings around them, but end up having to rescue the family when they are stuck in their car hanging over the edge of a broken bridge.
201	5	"The One"	Mic Graves	Ben Bocquelet, James Hamilton, Andrew Jones, Joe Markham, Ciaran Murtagh, and Tobi Wilson	Chloé Nicolay	January 19, 2018	May 7, 2018	GB606	0.79
Gumball is put off by Tobias' constant burns, despite the fact that he allows Darwin to do so and that he himself is self-deprecating. Realizing that Tobias wants to be his "best" friend, Gumball tries to let him down easily, but Tobias takes it as an invitation to eliminate Gumball's other friends, Highlander-style.
202	6	"The Father"	Mic Graves	Jack Bernhardt, Ben Bocquelet, James Hamilton, Joe Markham, and Tobi Wilson	Aurelie Charbonnier	January 26, 2018	May 8, 2018	GB609	0.83
Feeling bad for not having had a childhood with his father, Frankie, the kids convince Richard to try and reconnect with him through bonding, but Frankie cannot seem to break his criminal habits and Richard is starting to lose his patience with him.
203	7	"The Cringe"	Mic Graves & Kristian Andrews	Ben Bocquelet, James Hamilton, Andrew Jones, Joe Markham, Ciaran Murtagh, Joe Parham, and Tobi Wilson	Richard Méril	February 2, 2018	May 10, 2018	GB608	0.68
Fed up with their constant awkward encounters, Gumball and The Hot Dog Guy decide to be friends so they can revel in their embarrassing moments. When that doesn't work, however, Gumball fashions a makeshift time machine and the two go back to when all their awkward encounters started.
204	8	"The Cage"	Antoine Perez	Ben Bocquelet, James Hamilton, Joe Markham, and Tobi Wilson	Aurelie Charbonnier	February 9, 2018 (Note: This episode was first released online on December 8, 2017.)	May 3, 2018	GB604	0.81
When Mr. Corneille (the computer-pixelated frog geography teacher first seen on "The Others") lies to the Band-Aid school nurse about how he got injured, Gumball and Darwin think Mr. Corneille is a mixed-martial artist and convince him to go up against a Portuguese fighter named Joao "The Grave" Diga in a cage match to raise money badly needed for the school.
205	9	"The Faith"	Antoine Perez	Jack Bernhardt, Ben Bocquelet, Cariad Lloyd, Joe Markham, and Tobi Wilson	Richard Méril	February 23, 2018	May 30, 2018	GB611	0.87
Elmore suddenly loses its color and turns black and white. As the town descends into chaos, Gumball and Darwin venture out to look for the source and save Elmore by getting all the colors back which turns out to be Alan who has lost faith in humanity. The two convince him that while life is imperfect we must do our best to make the world a better place.
206	10	"The Candidate"	Antoine Perez	Jack Bernhardt, Ben Bocquelet, James Hamilton, Joe Markham, Tom Neenan, Joe Parham, Jon Purkis, Jess Ransom, and Tobi Wilson	Richard Méril	March 2, 2018	May 31, 2018	GB613	1.00
While the adults are having a charity gala for the school, Gumball decides to elect himself leader in a plan to escape from the school, but every decision he makes leads to the school crumbling.
207	11	"The Anybody"	Mic Graves	Mic Graves, James Hamilton, Joe Markham, Tom Neenan, Joe Parham, Jon Purkis, and Jess Ransom	Max Loubaresse	March 9, 2018	September 3, 2018	GB614	0.87
Clayton (the red ball of clay known for being a liar) poses as Gumball so Gumball can get out of detention for being late at school after he has a bad day, but Clayton takes his shapeshifting powers too far and ends up posing as different people in Elmore and framing them for misdemeanors. The two must follow him to apologize to Clayton. Note: This is Christian J. Simon's first episode voicing Darwin, succeeding Donielle T. Hansley Jr. who voices Darwin (for the last time) up until he clears his throat.
208	12	"The Pact"	Antoine Perez	Jack Bernhardt, Ben Bocquelet, James Hamilton, Joe Markham, Joe Parham, Eddie Robson, and Tobi Wilson	Aurelie Charbonnier	April 9, 2018	May 9, 2018	GB612	0.85
When Principal Brown has to take the bus, he and Gumball relate their grievances about their respective girlfriends (Miss Simian's bad morning breath and Penny's irritable laugh). They make a deal to tell each other's girlfriends about their issues, but Principal Brown backs out on his end, causing Gumball to pester him.
209	13	"The Neighbor"	Mic Graves	Ben Bocquelet, Mic Graves, James Hamilton, Andrew Jones, Joe Markham, Ciaran Murtagh, Joe Parham, and Tobi Wilson	Bianca Ansems	April 13, 2018	May 29, 2018	GB610	0.84
Gumball and Darwin realize that they don't know the name of their neighbor, the Antlers Guy. After trying and failing to know his name, they eventually learn that his name is Harry Gedges. Unfortunately, this turns out to be his "actual" name as the name he was under, Gary Hedges, was actually a cover name from the witness protection program. Note: This is the last episode that Donielle T. Hansley Jr. voices Darwin. Christian J. Simon takes over for him from "The Anybody" onward.
210	14	"The Shippening"	Antoine Perez	Ben Bocquelet, James Hamilton, Joe Markham, Tom Neenan, Joe Parham, and Jon Purkis	Aurelie Charbonnier	April 20, 2018	September 4, 2018	GB616	0.86
As the Awesome Store flees Elmore, it drops a Cartoon Network notebook that is found by Sarah who begins writing fan-fiction in it. Unbeknownst to her, her writing becomes reality in the town, and Gumball and Darwin confront her. They soon become pressured when the cops arrive looking to get the notebook back.
211	15	"The Brain"	Mic Graves	Jack Bernhardt, Ben Bocquelet, Mic Graves, Natasha Hodgson, Joe Markham, Joe Parham, and Tobi Wilson	Zhihuang Dong	June 18, 2018 (Note: This episode was first released online on June 15, 2018.)	September 5, 2018	GB615	0.49
Anais begins suffering from brain damage after facepalming so much from her family's stupidity. The doctor prescribes that the Wattersons not do anything stupid for a week, but Gumball, Darwin and Richard are too dumb to prevent any catastrophes and Nicole cannot stop running into inept people.
212	16	"The Parents"	Antoine Perez	Gemma Arrowsmith, Ben Bocquelet, James Hamilton, Joe Markham, and Tobi Wilson	Aurelie Charbonnier	June 18, 2018	September 10, 2018	GB625	0.52
The Wattersons run into Nicole's estranged parents, Daniel and Mary, and invite them home. They vent their frustrations out on each other regarding Nicole's anger issues and her parents' strict and overachieving expectations. Eventually, Gumball attempts to solve their problems with a song.
213	17	"The Founder"	Mic Graves	Gemma Arrowsmith, Mic Graves, James Hamilton, Joe Markham, and Tobi Wilson	Richard Méril	June 18, 2018	September 11, 2018	GB619	0.56
Nicole and Richard head to the Chanax building to pay for their internet. Even though he is told to wait outside, Richard wanders in and gets mistaken for the reclusive CEO of Chanax. His ideas end up causing chaos all throughout the building and Nicole must put a stop to it mostly so that she can pay that bill.
214	18	"The Schooling"	Antoine Perez	Gemma Arrowsmith, Ben Bocquelet, Mic Graves, James Hamilton, Joe Markham, and Joe Parham	Ben Marsaud	June 18, 2018	September 12, 2018	GB618	0.71
Gumball and Darwin complain about school and wish they can just get a job like Larry. Intrigued, Larry has Gumball and Darwin spend a day doing all of his jobs for "five minutes" while he goes on break. Gumball and Darwin are shocked to discover that doing every single job in Elmore is more difficult than they thought.
215	19	"The Intelligence"	Mic Graves	Gemma Arrowsmith, Mic Graves, James Hamilton, Joe Markham (Note: Joe Markham's name is credited twice by mistake.), and Tobi Wilson	Aurelie Charbonnier	June 18, 2018	September 13, 2018	GB621	0.68
Gumball and the Internet argue with each other causing the latter to upgrade himself. Unfortunately, he becomes overpowered causing all technology to stop working, sending everyone into the Dark Ages. With no other options, Gumball and Darwin set out to look for the Internet and figure out how to fix him.
216	20	"The Potion"	Mic Graves	Jack Bernhardt, Ben Bocquelet, Sophie Duker, Mic Graves, Joe Markham, and Tobi Wilson	Bianca Ansems	July 16, 2018 (Note: This episode was first released online on July 12, 2018.)	September 14, 2018	GB622	0.42
Hector Jotunheim is tired of being tall, so Gumball and Darwin steal a potion book from his mother to make him small. Hector ends up disliking his new height and asks to be turned back to normal, Gumball and Darwin oblige, but they forget an ingredient causing Hector to morph and forcing them to find the missing ingredient.
217	21	"The Spinoffs"	Antoine Perez	Ben Bocquelet, Mic Graves, James Hamilton, Natasha Hodgson, Joe Markham, and Tobi Wilson	Max Loubaresse	July 16, 2018	May 1, 2019	GB620	0.55
Rob kidnaps the Internet and forces him to play a VHS tape full of pilots that focus on other characters, including Banana Joe, Tina, Bobert, Larry, and Tobias.
218	22	"The Transformation"	Antoine Perez & Julian Glander	Ben Bocquelet, Andrew Jones, Joe Markham, Ciaran Murtagh, Joe Parham, Tobi Wilson, and Lucien Young	Richard Meril	July 16, 2018	May 2, 2019	GB626	0.65
While on a video chat, Penny asks Gumball to help them settle an argument over whether her family is in or out of their shells. After much debating, Patrick and Penny tell a story about whether they should or shouldn't be in their shells. So Patrick asks Gumball to settle the argument and he tells story after story to try and make them change their mind. Guest animation provided by: Julian Glander
219	23	"The Understanding"	Mic Graves	Jack Bernhardt, Mic Graves, James Hamilton, Tony Hull, Joe Markham, Joe Parham, and Tobi Wilson	Bianca Ansems	July 16, 2018	May 7, 2019	GB629	0.69
Principal Brown introduces a new student named Peter Pepperoni to Gumball and Darwin. However, Peter's speech is almost entirely gibberish and Gumball and Darwin have no idea what he is saying. This ends up leading the two to meet his parents who have an intense dislike for the government and bring them along on a heist.
220	24	"The Ad"	Antoine Perez	Ben Bocquelet, Sophie Duker, James Hamilton, Joe Markham, Tobi Wilson, and Lucien Young	Ben Marsaud	July 16, 2018	May 3, 2019	GB633	0.69
Richard buys a horse named Wunderklopp which angers Nicole. Luckily, she has already contacted someone to buy it, but he will not arrive to get it for two weeks. In the meantime, the Wattersons decide to transform their home into a Bed and Breakfast for a goat couple named Bernie and Ethel. Things seem fine until they "die" and the Wattersons must fake their stay in Elmore.
221	25	"The Ghouls"	Antoine Perez	Ben Bocquelet, Mic Graves, Tony Hull, Joe Markham, Richard Overall, Jess Ransom, Paul Rice, and Tobi Wilson	Oliver Hamilton	October 19, 2018 (Note: This episode was first released online on October 1, 2018.)	September 13, 2019	GB643	0.68
Gumball and Darwin visit Carrie who is upset that Halloween isn't scary anymore and is just a day where people care about candy. To prove her point, she takes the two around Elmore to show what has become of all of the famous horror icons. Gumball and Darwin then decide that they want to help Halloween get its scare back.
222	26	"The Stink"	Mic Graves	Jack Bernhardt, Mic Graves, James Hamilton, Joe Markham, Joe Parham, and Tobi Wilson	Bianca Ansems	November 5, 2018 (Note: This episode was accidentally leaked online on April 28, 2018.)	September 6, 2018	GB617	0.63
Gumball points out to Mr. Small that everything he does has consequences and therefore makes him hypocritical when it comes to living a healthy vegan lifestyle. Overcome with remorse, Mr. Small decides to cut himself off from society and live in the wild, forcing Gumball and Darwin to go and rescue him before he hurts himself.
223	27	"The Awareness"	Antoine Perez	Jack Bernhardt, Mic Graves, Joe Markham, Tom Neenan, Joe Parham, and Tobi Wilson	Zhihuang Dong	November 6, 2018	September 7, 2018	GB624	0.60
Gumball accidentally offends Leslie when he says that plants are useless on Green Week. Feeling that Leslie is taking advantage of him for not knowing much about plant culture, Gumball decides to get back at him by exploiting supposed "plant things" that he and Leslie can do.
224	28	"The Slip"	Mic Graves	Mic Graves, Joe Markham, Jess Ransom, and Tobi Wilson	Aurelie Charbonnier	November 7, 2018	May 6, 2019	GB634	0.57
After missing his package, Richard cannot be bothered with picking it up at the package depot or paying for it. The mail delivery bird criticizes him for his laziness and begins tormenting him by having him repeatedly miss his package. Richard, along with Gumball and Darwin, set out to get the package from him.
225	29	"The Drama"	Mic Graves	Gemma Arrowsmith, Ben Bocquelet, James Hamilton, Joe Markham, Tobi Wilson, and Lucien Young	Aurelie Charbonnier	November 8, 2018	May 27, 2019	GB630	0.58
After talking to Leslie and Masami, Gumball begins to doubt the solid nature of Darwin and Carrie's relationship due to their contrasting personalities and tastes. This is further complicated by the appearance of Azrael, Carrie's ex who has come for a visit, forcing Gumball to intervene. Guest animation provided by: Jeremy Pines
226	30	"The Buddy"	Antoine Perez	Jack Bernhardt, Ben Bocquelet, Natasha Hodgson, Joe Markham, Joe Parham, and Tobi Wilson	Richard Meril	November 9, 2018	TBA	GB623	0.66
When the computers in the library suddenly come down with a virus, Anais and Jamie are viewed as the culprits by Principal Brown. In order to clear their names, the two decide to solve the mystery with Anais hoping to make Jamie her friend.
227	31	"The Possession"	Mic Graves	Mic Graves, Tony Hull, and Joe Markham	Zhihuang Dong	April 15, 2019	September 4, 2019	GB642	0.44
Nicole tries to get Richard to get rid of the refrigerator due to its age, but he refuses due to the memories he's had with it. He agrees under the condition that she and Granny Jojo get along. As Richard and the kids try and fail to get rid of it, Nicole and Jojo discover that it came from the Awesome Store and that Richard is in danger.
228	32	"The Master"	Mic Graves	Jack Bernhardt, Ben Bocquelet, Mic Graves, Natasha Hodgson, Tony Hull, Joe Markham, Tobi Wilson, and Lucien Young	Bianca Ansems	April 22, 2019	TBA	GB632	0.53
Gumball, Darwin, Anais, and Nicole will not stop arguing with each other. To get them to stop, Richard decides to set up a tabletop role-playing game for Saturday game night with himself as the dungeon master. The Wattersons must now put aside their differences if they want to get through Richard's campaign.
229	33	"The Silence"	Antoine Perez	Ben Bocquelet, Joe Markham, Jess Ransom, and Tobi Wilson	Aurelie Charbonnier	April 29, 2019 (Note: This episode was first released online on December 13, 2018.)	May 28, 2019	GB637	0.56
While having another typical colorful conversation, Gumball and Darwin realize that they have run out of interesting things to say. They try numerous things such as therapy, medicine and other outlandish tactics to get their verbal exchange back, but fear that their friendship is growing stale and struggle to save it.
230	34	"The Future"	Mic Graves	Ben Bocquelet, James Hamilton, Joe Markham, Jon Purkis, and Tobi Wilson	Richard Meril	May 6, 2019 (Note: This episode was first released online on May 3, 2019.)	May 29, 2019	GB601	0.55
Banana Barbara has been missing for a week and Gumball, Darwin and Banana Joe have been looking all over Elmore to find her. She has actually been kidnapped by Rob who wants her to paint a specific future for him. Meanwhile, Banana Joe reveals the origin of Banana Barbara's bizarre prophetic abilities.
231	35	"The Wish"	Mic Graves	Gemma Arrowsmith, Mic Graves, James Hamilton, Tony Hull, and Joe Markham	Max Loubaresse	May 13, 2019	May 30, 2019	GB627	0.52
Principal Brown is having trouble saying "I love you" to Miss Simian, causing her to think that their relationship is over. In a very bizarre turn of events, Gumball and Darwin think that they may have accidentally wished Miss Simian into a neck pillow. Principal Brown must now try to "break the curse" and make her normal.
232	36	"The Factory"	Mic Graves	Jack Bernhardt, Ben Bocquelet, James Hamilton, Joe Markham, and Tobi Wilson	Max Loubaresse	May 20, 2019	May 31, 2019	GB631	0.46
For bring your child to work day, Gumball and Darwin force themselves to the Rainbow Factory to see Nicole's workplace. To their surprise, the Rainbow Factory turns out to be a dreary place that makes making rainbows look bland. Nicole must also try to impress the investors who are threatening to shut down the factory.
233	37	"The Agent"	Mic Graves	Mic Graves, Tony Hull, and Richard Overall	Zhihuang Dong	May 27, 2019	September 9, 2019	GB636	0.51
In a parody of James Bond, Gumball and Darwin end up with "spy clothes" after misplacing their own. Principal Brown sends them on a "mission" to look for items that have been stolen from around the school. The duo, along with Bobert, travel across Elmore to discover that William is the culprit who then tries to frame them.
234	38	"The Web"	Antoine Perez	Ben Bocquelet, Mic Graves, Joe Markham, Richard Overall, Joe Parham, Jess Ransom, and Tobi Wilson	Aurelie Charbonnier	June 3, 2019 (Note: This episode was first released online on May 31, 2019.)	September 11, 2019	GB641	0.44
When it becomes apparent that Nicole knows absolutely nothing about computers, Gumball and Darwin head to her workplace to see what exactly it is she is doing on her computer. They begin to find it funny when they see that all the adults fail to understand computers until they realize just how serious that is.
235	39	"The Mess"	Mic Graves	Ben Bocquelet, Joe Markham, Jess Ransom, Tobi Wilson, and Lucien Young	Max Loubaresse	June 10, 2019	September 3, 2019	GB640	0.50
Gumball and Darwin stay up all night watching videos despite having to babysit Penny's sister Polly in the morning. Their lack of sleep causes them to black out during their time with her and cause them to lose her in a series of increasingly bizarre and erratic situations. In the end, all of the missing spaces are filled in by Polly herself.
236	40	"The Heart"	Antoine Perez	Ben Bocquelet, Joe Markham, Jess Ransom, and Tobi Wilson,	Bianca Ansems	June 10, 2019	September 5, 2019	GB635	0.54
Gumball and Darwin overhear Mr. Robinson admit that he hates the two. He actually begins to feel bad and at the suggestion of his son Rocky, tries to find some way to make up with them. Gumball and Darwin learn that the problem lies within his heart who tells them that he hates feelings forcing the two to try to teach it about love.
237	41	"The Revolt"	Mic Graves	Ben Bocquelet, Mic Graves, James Hamilton, Natasha Hodgson, Tony Hull, Joe Markham, Joe Parham, and Tobi Wilson	Zhihuang Dong	June 17, 2019	September 2, 2019	GB628	0.47
Darwin tries to convince the objects around Elmore to stop being repressed by their owners. He fails to get through to them, but when he and Gumball accidentally inform them that they get replaced and thrown out after being misused or used up, they begin to rise up and revolt against the people of Elmore.
238	42	"The Decisions"	Mic Graves	Mic Graves, Tony Hull, Joe Markham, Richard Overall, Tobi Wilson, and Lucien Young	Adrian Maganza	June 17, 2019	September 10, 2019	GB638	0.51
Darwin has trouble making decisions, so he has Gumball decide for him. After a week, Darwin has had enough and decides to have Alan be his new mentor. Things appear to be fine, but Gumball points out that he is still listening to others instead of himself. Darwin's indecision leads to the mall getting flooded and Darwin needing to save the day.
239	43	"The BFFs"	Antoine Perez	Ben Bocquelet, Joe Parham, Jess Ransom, and Tobi Wilson	Bianca Ansems	June 24, 2019	September 6, 2019	GB639	0.46
Gumball's old BFF from Minnesota, Fuzzy (guest voiced by Jack Simmons), returns to catch up on old times. Darwin immediately becomes jealous and suspicious, despite Gumball's insistence that he is still his BFF. After another argument, Gumball heads back to Fuzzy's place, only to learn that he is psychotic and wants to keep Gumball to himself.
240	44	"The Inquisition"	Mic Graves	Ben Bocquelet, Mic Graves, Joe Markham, Richard Overall, Joe Parham, Jess Ransom, and Tobi Wilson	Adrian Maganza	June 24, 2019	September 12, 2019	GB644	0.51
School Superintendent Evil (/ˈɛvəl/; guest acted by Garrick Hagon) comes to Elmore Junior High and critiques the quality of the school. He begins banishing all cartoonish behavior and transforming everyone into humans to eventually make them live-action like himself. Gumball and Darwin race to save everyone and manage to change everyone back to normal, only to discover that Evil is actually Rob in disguise. He tries to justify his actions and warn everyone about an unspecified event, but Tina knocks him out. Rob wakes up in the school late at night as the Void opens beneath him and swallows him away, ending the main series on a cliffhanger.
