= The Inquisition (The Amazing World of Gumball) =

2019 series finale of The Amazing World of Gumball

- The Amazing World of Gumball episode
- Gumball, Darwin, and Banana Joe face Superintendent Evil (Garrick Hagon), a live-action character integrated into the animated setting.
- Episode no.: Season 6 Episode 44
- Directed by: Mic Graves
- Written by: Ben Bocquelet; Mic Graves; Joe Markham; Richard Overall; Joe Parham; Jess Ransom; Tobi Wilson
- Production code: GB644
- Original air date: June 24, 2019

Guest appearance
- Garrick Hagon as Superintendent Evil

Episode chronology
← Previous "The BFFs"	Next → "The Burger"

"The Inquisition" is the series finale of the British-American animated sitcom The Amazing World of Gumball. It serves as the forty-fourth episode of season six and the 240th overall. Directed by Mic Graves and written by series creator Ben Bocquelet alongside a team of writers, the episode premiered on Cartoon Network in the United States on June 24, 2019.

The story follows Superintendent Evil (played by Garrick Hagon), a real human attempting to force Elmore Junior High's animated students into realistic human forms. Gumball and Darwin use chaotic cartoon logic to snap their classmates out of the spell, culminating in the unmasking of the Superintendent as their former classmate-turned-enemy, Rob. Before Rob can explain his motives, the floor collapses and swallows him into a dark void, concluding the original series run on an unresolved cliffhanger.

Upon its broadcast, "The Inquisition" drew 0.51 million U.S. viewers. Reviews praised its blend of live-action integration and self-aware humor, though David Kaldor of Bubbleblabber criticized the abrupt ending. Conceived as a setup for a planned feature film, the cliffhanger ultimately found resolution in the 2025 continuation series, The Wonderfully Weird World of Gumball.

== Plot ==
Principal Brown warns the faculty at Elmore Junior High about an upcoming school inspection. During an assembly, a live-action human calling himself Superintendent Evil announces a mandate to strip the school of its cartoonish nature. Using a specialized ray, he forces the animated students into stiff, quiet, and unnaturally formal human actors.

Gumball and Darwin locate the transformation device inside his office. Escaping capture, the brothers realize that reminding their friends of their exaggerated cartoon traits breaks the machine's influence. Backed by Banana Joe, they perform a frantic musical routine that causes the students to break character and revert to their animated designs.

The restored students corner the Superintendent and pull off his mask to reveal Rob—Gumball and Darwin's former background classmate. Rob explains that his drastic scheme aimed to turn everyone human to escape an impending disaster threatening their world. Before he can elaborate, Tina Rex knocks him unconscious. Waking up alone in the dark school building that night, Rob falls through a sudden floor collapse into "the Void"—a cosmic dimension where forgotten mistakes are discarded.

== Production ==
"The Inquisition" brought a close to the original 240-episode run of The Amazing World of Gumball. Mic Graves directed the episode from scripts by series creator Ben Bocquelet, Graves, Joe Markham, Richard Overall, Joe Parham, Jess Ransom, and Tobi Wilson.

Diverging from the show's standard aesthetic, the finale heavily incorporates live-action footage, featuring Garrick Hagon as Superintendent Evil. Because season six marked Bocquelet's final season on the show, the creative team deliberately structured the ending around an unresolved cliffhanger intended to transition directly into a feature film.

== Reception and analysis ==
=== Viewership ===
Airing on Cartoon Network on June 24, 2019, the finale pulled in 0.51 million viewers and a 0.1 rating in the 18–49 demographic, translating to 0.1 percent of all households within that age bracket.

=== Critical response ===
David Kaldor of Bubbleblabber awarded the episode a 7 out of 10, praising the live-action elements while panning the abrupt cliffhanger for leaving viewers without closure after years of storytelling. Reviewer Matt Alamode gave it an A+, highlighting its meta-humor as a clever parody of the show's visual identity. Writing for SlashFilm, Caroline Cao interpreted the plot—where characters are forced to turn human—as a satirical commentary on television executives favoring live-action over animation.

== Continuation ==
Ben Bocquelet initially planned a feature film to pick up immediately after Rob's fall into the Void and provide a definitive conclusion. Over the next several years, the project shifted through multiple developmental hurdles:

- February 2021: Cartoon Network confirmed that a franchise film was actively in development.
- September 2021: A companion series was greenlit alongside the movie for Cartoon Network and HBO Max.
- August 2022: Corporate restructuring led to HBO Max dropping the film from its release slate, prompting producers to shop it to external buyers.
- June 2023–2024: Festival presentations at Annecy confirmed script revisions were underway for the movie, while the companion project expanded into a full revival series.
- July 2025: The revival series, The Wonderfully Weird World of Gumball, premiered.

The cliffhanger ultimately received closure in the second-season finale of the revival, "The Rewrite". In the episode, Rob is rescued from the Void by the Awesome Store owner and subsequently attempts to manipulate reality to prevent Gumball and Darwin from discovering the school's structural tear.
