= List of The Amazing World of Gumball characters =

List of fictional characters shown in The Amazing World of Gumball

The Watterson family, depicted outside their home; clockwise from top left: Gumball, Nicole, Richard, Anais (with Daisy) and Darwin.

The Amazing World of Gumball and its revival series The Wonderfully Weird World of Gumball are two animated sitcoms created by Ben Bocquelet. The series revolves around the daily life of 12-year-old cat Gumball Watterson and his family—adoptive brother goldfish Darwin, younger sister Anais, and parents Nicole (née Senicourt) and Richard. Other Elmore Junior High students also have recurring roles. Creator Ben Bocquelet conceived The Amazing World of Gumball in 2007 while working for Cartoon Network Development Studio Europe, and based several of its characters on previous characters he had created for commercials.

== Main characters ==
Character	Season							
Character	1	2	3	4	5	6	Miniseries	TWWWOG
Gumball Watterson	Logan Grove (Note: Main cast from "The DVD" to "The Kids".)	Logan Grove	Logan Grove	Jacob Hopkins (Note: Main cast from "The Kids" to "The Copycats".)	Jacob Hopkins	Nicolas Cantu (Note: Main cast from "The Copycats" to "The Inquisition".)	Duke Cutler (Note: Main cast from "The Curse of Elmore" to "Elmore's Most Wanted".)	Alkaio Thiele
Darwin Watterson	Kwesi Boakye	Kwesi Boakye	Kwesi Boakye	Terrell Ransom Jr.	Terrell Ransom Jr.	Donielle T. Hansley Jr. (Note: Main cast from "The Copycats" to "The Anybody".)	Christian J. Simon (Note: Main cast from "The Anybody" to "Elmore's Most Wanted".)	Hero Hunter
Anais Watterson	Kyla Rae Kowalewski	Kyla Rae Kowalewski	Kyla Rae Kowalewski	Kyla Rae Kowalewski	Kyla Rae Kowalewski	Kyla Rae Kowalewski	Kyla Rae Kowalewski	Kinza Syed Khan
Nicole Watterson	Teresa Gallagher	Teresa Gallagher	Teresa Gallagher	Teresa Gallagher	Teresa Gallagher	Teresa Gallagher	Teresa Gallagher	Teresa Gallagher
Richard Watterson	Dan Russell	Dan Russell	Dan Russell	Dan Russell	Dan Russell	Dan Russell	Dan Russell	Dan Russell

Notes

Episodes are dictated by title as the series order is not consistent with the production order, original airing order, or order on streaming services like HBO Max.

=== Gumball Watterson ===
Gumball Watterson
- Gumball's appearance in Season 2
- First appearance: "Early Reel" (2008)
- Created by: Ben Bocquelet
- Voiced by: Logan Grove (2011–2014); Jacob Hopkins (2014–2017); Nicolas Cantu (2017–2019); Duke Cutler (2020–2021); Alkaio Thiele (2025–present)

In-universe information
- Full name: Gumball Tristopher Watterson (born Zach Tristopher Watterson)
- Species: Cat
- Gender: Male
- Occupation: Student at Elmore Junior High (seventh grade; eighth-grader as revealed in "The Grades")
- Family: Richard Watterson (father); Nicole Watterson (mother); Darwin Watterson (adoptive brother); Anais Watterson (sister)
- Significant other: Penny Fitzgerald
- Relatives: Frankie Watterson (paternal grandfather); Jojo Watterson (paternal grandmother); Daniel Senicourt (maternal grandfather); Mary Senicourt (maternal grandmother); Louie Watterson (step-grandfather)
- Nationality: American

Gumball Tristopher Watterson, born Zach Tristopher Watterson, is the main and titular protagonist of the show. He is a 12-year-old mischievous blue cat who lives with his family. He attends middle school with Darwin and Anais. In "The Club", it is revealed that his middle name was supposed to be Christopher, but was actually misspelled as Tristopher ("Trisha" for short) on his birth certificate. In "The Name", he learned that his legal name is Zach and began using it, but later has his legal name changed to Gumball. He dates Penny following the events of "The Shell".

Gumball was initially presented as well-meaning, but naive. Later, he was shown as more serious, capable of logical thinking, and sarcastic. Despite occasional lapses in judgment and having a large ego, often causing him to overreact, Gumball is loyal, straightforward, good-natured, and protective of his loved ones.

=== Darwin Watterson ===
Darwin Watterson
- First appearance: "Early Reel" (2008)
- Created by: Ben Bocquelet
- Voiced by: Kwesi Boakye (2011–2014); Terrell Ransom Jr. (2014–2017); Donielle T. Hansley Jr. (2017–2018); Christian J. Simon (2018–2021); Hero Hunter (2025–present)

In-universe information
- Full name: Darwin Raglan Caspian Ahab Poseidon Nicodemus Watterson III
- Species: Goldfish
- Gender: Male
- Occupation: Student at Elmore Junior High
- Family: Richard Watterson (adoptive father); Nicole Watterson (adoptive mother); Gumball Watterson (adoptive brother); Anais Watterson (adoptive sister)
- Significant other: Carrie Krueger
- Relatives: Frankie Watterson (paternal grandfather); Jojo Watterson (paternal grandmother); Daniel Senicourt (maternal grandfather); Mary Senicourt (maternal grandmother); Louie Watterson (step-grandfather)
- Nationality: American

Darwin Raglan Caspian Ahab Poseidon Nicodemus Watterson III (Note: In "The Party", it is revealed that this is Darwin's full name.) is a 10-year-old orange goldfish who was adopted by the Watterson family. Initially given to Gumball as a pet, Darwin later sprouted legs and became a full family member. His arc begins with him as a naif, then shows him maturing. Darwin has an optimistic view of things, and is always trying to do the right thing. However his kindness is sometimes to his detriment. Darwin is loyal to Gumball often tagging along with him, despite not always being on his side. He often acts as Gumball's voice of reason, trying to push him to do the right thing. He is sometimes shown exhibiting strange behavior, such as calling his adoptive parents Mr. Dad and Mrs. Mom.

=== Anais Watterson ===
Anais Watterson
- First appearance: "The Responsible" (2011)
- Created by: Ben Bocquelet
- Voiced by: Kyla Rae Kowalewski (2011–2021); Kinza Syed Khan (2025–present)

In-universe information
- Full name: Anais Errrrrr Watterson
- Nickname: Sis (by Gumball)
- Species: Rabbit
- Gender: Female
- Occupation: Student at Elmore Junior High
- Family: Richard Watterson (father); Nicole Watterson (mother); Gumball Watterson (brother); Darwin Watterson (adopted brother)
- Relatives: Frankie Watterson (paternal grandfather); Jojo Watterson (paternal grandmother); Daniel Senicourt (maternal grandfather); Mary Senicourt (maternal grandmother); Louie Watterson (step-grandfather)
- Nationality: American

Anais Errrrrr Watterson, a pink rabbit, is Gumball's precocious 4-year-old sister. She is one grade above her brothers and is often shown telling Gumball what to do. She often impatiently tags along with him as a voice of reason, but has also been shown manipulating her family to get what she wants. She sometimes exhibits childlike behavior and is shown as socially inept and incapable of forming friendships as she drives potential friends away with over-the-top clinginess. In "The Gumball Chronicles: Ancestor Act", it's revealed that her middle name is "Errrrrr", due to Richard not having enough time to pick a middle name.

=== Nicole Watterson ===
Nicole Watterson
- First appearance: "The DVD" (2011)
- Created by: Ben Bocquelet
- Voiced by: Teresa Gallagher

In-universe information
- Full name: Doctor Nicole Watterson (née Senicourt)
- Alias: Nicole Senicourt
- Species: Cat
- Gender: Female
- Occupation: Employee at the Rainbow Factory
- Family: Daniel Senicourt (father); Mary Senicourt (mother)
- Spouse: Richard Watterson
- Children: Gumball Watterson (son); Darwin Watterson (adopted son); Anais Watterson (daughter)
- Relatives: Frankie Watterson (father-in-law); Joanna Watterson (mother-in-law); Louie Watterson (step-father-in-law)
- Nationality: American

Doctor Nicole Watterson (née Senicourt) is a 38-year-old cat and the mother of Gumball, Darwin, and Anais. She is a bossy, over-stressed, hot-tempered workaholic, who can be sweet. Nicole is a master martial artist, knowing karate and winning numerous tournaments when she was young. She shows affection for and is protective of her family. Nicole is occasionally vindictive, while also resourceful and inventive. In "The Parents", it is revealed that Doctor is her first name and Nicole is her middle name.

=== Richard Watterson ===
Richard Watterson
- First appearance: "The Responsible" (2011)
- Created by: Ben Bocquelet
- Voiced by: Dan Russell

In-universe information
- Full name: Richard Buckley Watterson
- Species: Rabbit (series); Dog (prototype)
- Gender: Male
- Occupation: Unemployed; Pizza Delivery Driver (formerly); Employee at Chanax Inc. (formerly)
- Family: Frankie Watterson (father); Jojo Watterson (mother); Louie (stepfather)
- Spouse: Nicole Watterson (née Senicourt)
- Children: Gumball Watterson (son); Darwin Watterson (adopted son); Anais Watterson (daughter)
- Relatives: Mrs. Beresford (grandmother); Daniel Senicourt (father-in-law); Mary Senicourt (mother-in-law)
- Nationality: American

Richard Buckley Watterson is a 38-year-old anthropomorphic pink rabbit. He is the father of Gumball, Darwin and Anais. A stay-at-home dad, he spends most of his time sleeping, watching TV, and playing video games. Richard sometimes dresses as a woman, calling himself Samantha. He is "the laziest person in Elmore". He has a large appetite and is a voracious eater. Richard often serves as a third wheel to his sons' misadventures and cares deeply for his family despite his lethargy. He is naive and frequently gets called "dumb".

Richard is shown exhibiting childish behavior. He enjoys pulling pranks and laughing at people, but hates it when others prank or laugh at him.

== Recurring characters ==
Various Elmore Junior High students
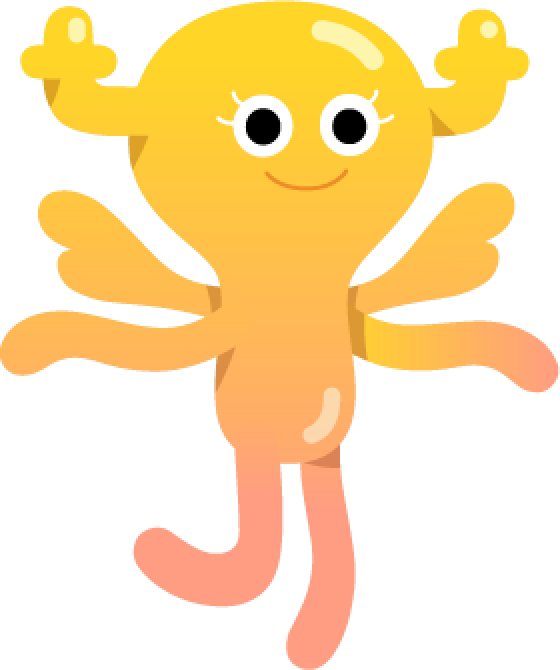
Penny Fitzgerald (without shell)

Carrie Krueger

Tobias Wilson

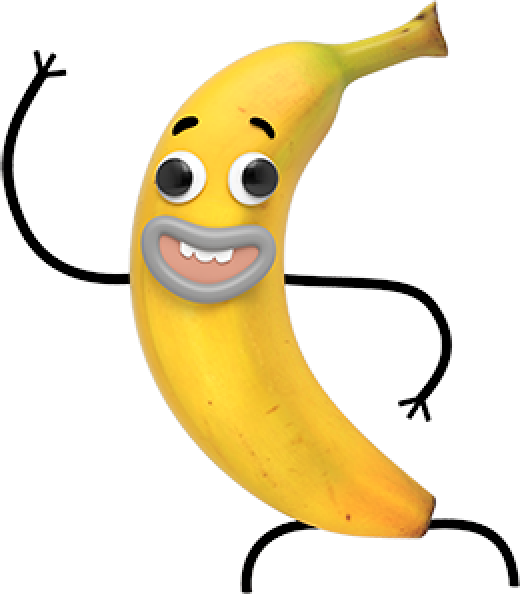
Banana Joe

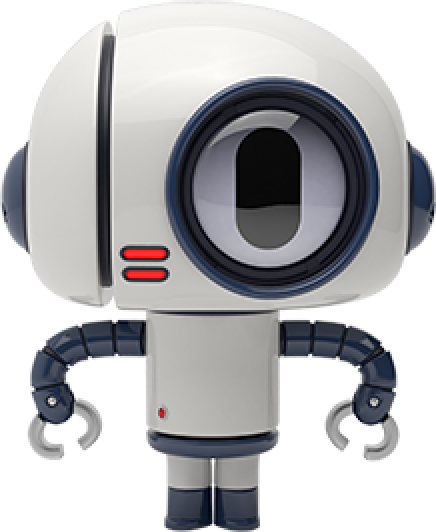
Bobert 6B

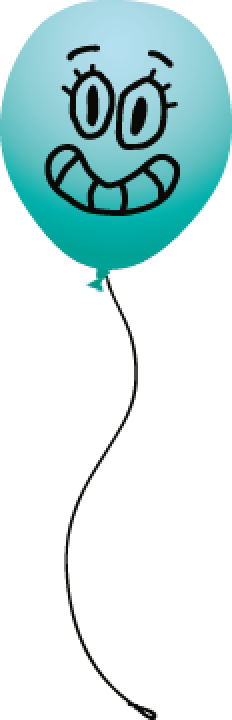
Alan Keane

Carmen Verde

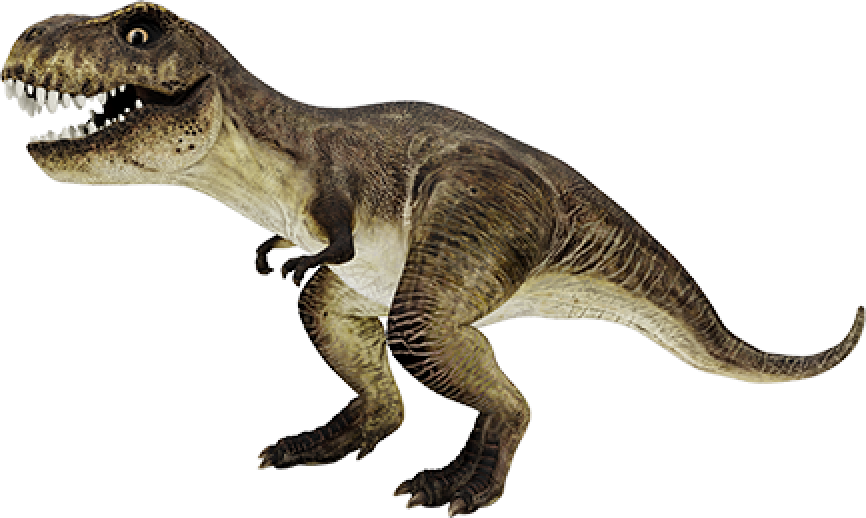
Tina Rex

Molly Collins

=== Elmore Junior High students ===
Several Elmore Junior High students gathered in the school cafeteria. The series features a variety of different animals, creatures and objects for characters such as Gumball and his classmates.

==== Penny Fitzgerald ====
Penelope (Note: Revealed in "The Amadain".) "Penny" Fitzgerald (voiced by Teresa Gallagher) is a shape-shifting fairy (formerly a peanut with antlers) and classmate of Gumball who belatedly becomes his girlfriend. Like Gumball, she has trouble expressing her feelings. While generally nicer and more level-headed, she can stoop down to Gumball's level. Underneath Penny's shell lies a yellow, fairy-like self that shape-shifts based on her emotional state. She comes from a family of shapeshifters who all hide their true forms behind shells, which her parents, in "The Transformation", thought was deeply inappropriate and shameful. She, alongside her cousin Leslie, is a member of the Elmore Junior High cheerleading and synchronized swimming teams.

==== Rob ====
Rob (voiced by Charles Philipp, season 2–"The Nemesis" and "The Disaster"–season 6; Max Cazier, TWWWOG onward; David Warner "The Nemesis"–"The Disaster") — also known as Dr. Wrecker — is a tall cyclops and former Elmore Junior High student who becomes Gumball's arch-nemesis. He first appears in the series as a background character who was often forgotten by his classmates. After escaping the Void – to which he was exiled as a "mistake" – Rob becomes a "bad guy" to enact revenge on Gumball and "play a part in the world". He is aware of his fictional existence and his hatred towards Gumball is a result of his role as the protagonist, which forces Rob into the role of a villain. In "The Inquisition", he attempts to save the main cast from the destruction of their world but fails, falling into the Void instead. By the events of "The Rewrite", he is saved by the Awesome Store's owner from the literal plot hole before ultimately superseding his role to protect the series' characters when it is eventually pulled from the air.

==== Carrie Krueger ====
Carrie Krueger (voiced by Jessica McDonald) is a ghost who lives in a malevolent mansion and "enjoys being depressed". She can teleport and possess living bodies. She is the daughter of a man who formed a romantic relationship with a female ghost. She and Darwin become a couple in "The Matchmaker". Carrie's last name is a reference to Freddy Krueger from the A Nightmare on Elm Street franchise.

==== Tobias Wilson ====
Tobias Wilson (voiced by Rupert Degas, season 1; Hugo Harrison, season 2 onward) is a multicolored, cloud-shaped humanoid who is interested in sports, possesses an overbearing self-confidence, and thinks of himself as cooler than he really is. He thinks of himself as a heavily built jock, despite actually being rather weak, and appears to be wealthy. He debuts in "The Third", where he demands twenty dollars to be Gumball and Darwin's friend.

==== Banana Joe ====
Joseph "Banana Joe" A. Banana (voiced by Mic Graves, season 1-6; Unknown, TWWWOG onward) is a hyperactive banana and the class clown, who cracks a joke whenever possible. He can be a bully, usually to Gumball and Darwin.

==== Masami Yoshida ====
Masami Yoshida (voiced by Jessica McDonald) is a cloud who is the wealthy daughter of Mr. Yoshida and Yuki Yoshida, the Rainbow Factory's owners. She is spoiled, tantrum-prone and vindictive. When angry, she can develop into a storm cloud capable of causing massive damage.

==== Bobert 6B ====
Bobert 6B (voiced by Kerry Shale) is a robot who is one of the smartest students, but constantly struggles to understand emotion and develop a social life. He can transform into a larger form by triggering his "defense mode".

==== Sarah G. Lato ====
Sarah G. Lato (voiced by Jessica McDonald) is a yellow ice cream cone and student. She is depicted as an obsessive fan of Gumball and Darwin. She is named after Sarah Fell, the show's producer.

==== Leslie ====
Leslie (voiced by Kerry Shale) is an effeminate, friendly daisy who plays flute in the school band and can often be found hanging around the girls. He is Penny's and Polly's cousin. In "The Diary", he begins dating Wilson Bilson.

==== Alan Keane ====
Alan Keane (voiced by Kerry Shale, season 1; Hugo Harrison, season 2 onward) is a teal-colored balloon who is Carmen's boyfriend. He is overly nice and even-tempered. Being filled with helium, Alan regularly speaks in a high-pitched voice. In "The Photo", Gumball envies him for having a beautiful face. Alan rebuffs this, but Gumball replies: "Dude, even your mole looks better than me". In "The Vision" it is revealed Alan secretly plans to take over the world and rule it as a dictator, brainwashing people to eradicate sadness. After discovering this, Gumball and Darwin attempt to assassinate Alan, which they succeed in after many failed attempts – though he reappears in subsequent episodes without any explanation. It was shown in "The Faith" that the world goes through chaos if Alan stops his kindness.

==== Carmen Verde ====
Carmen Verde (voiced by Teresa Gallagher, season 1; Alix Wilton Regan, season 2 onward) is a cactus who is considered to be a leader. She is Alan's girlfriend. Carmen is a cheerleader who is best friends with Penny, Sarah, and Molly. Before moving to Elmore Junior High, Carmen was a notorious troublemaker at her old school, Franklin Junior High, which led to her expulsion.

==== Teri ====
Teri (voiced by Teresa Gallagher) is a hypochondriac paper bear usually found in the nurse's office. Although somewhat self-absorbed and paranoid, she is very nice and is a cheerleader.

==== Hector Jötunheim ====
Hector Jötunheim (voiced by Kerry Shale) is a gentle Bigfoot-like giant. He is the largest student in Elmore Junior High, so that only his legs and feet are seen on-screen. He can be dangerous if he expresses too much emotion, such as anger, sadness or excitement. His surname is a reference to Jötunheimr, the homeland of giants in Norse mythology.

==== Tina Rex ====
Tina Rex (voiced by Dan Russell, season 1; Stefan Ashton Frank, season 2 onward) is a Tyrannosaurus who lives in the city junkyard, and a notorious bully. She often picks on her fellow schoolmates, especially Gumball, and has her own gang of bullies which includes Jamie and Anton. She is one of the strongest and most aggressive students. Her Cartoon Network biography suggests that she might have animosity toward others because she is "angry at the world for not noticing her femininity".

==== Idaho ====
Idaho (voiced by Kerry Shale, season 1; Hugo Harrison, season 2 onward) is a free-spirited potato from the countryside with conservative beliefs. He is one of the less popular students.

==== Anton ====
Anton (voiced by Tony Hull, season 1 to season 6; TBA, TWWWOG onward) is a piece of toast who is forcibly drafted into Tina's gang, hoping that by appeasing her he will avoid her anger. He is prone to getting killed in various freak accidents, only to be resurrected by his parents with a toaster that creates a new slice of him.

==== Juke ====
Juke (voiced by Hugo Harrison, music by Beatbox Hobbit) is a native of Boomboxemburg with a boombox for a head and he moves to Elmore. He speaks entirely in beatboxing. As a result, nobody can understand him. He is able to speak English if he is switched from "Music Mode" to "Voice Mode" through a switch on the back of his head, as seen in "The Boombox", but his arms are too short to reach it and his attempts to communicate this fact to others fail.

==== Sussie ====
Sussie (face by Aurelie Charbonnier, voiced by Fergus Craig season 1 to season 4, voiced by Aurelie Charbonnier season 5, Ben Bocquelet voiced her screaming, yelling, and laughing Season 2 onward) is an upside-down chin with googly eyes and puppet-like characteristics. She is talkative, odd, and obnoxious, and as a result, is generally avoided by her classmates.

==== Clayton ====
Clayton (voiced by Rupert Degas, season 1; Max Cazier, season 2 onward) is a red ball of clay who can shapeshift into anything and is a compulsive liar with a tendency to make up absurd stories.

==== Rachel Wilson ====
Rachel Wilson (voiced by Jessica McDonald) is Tobias' older sister. Despite frequently appearing as a background character in season one, her only prominent role was in the episode "The Party", in which she refuses to allow Tobias' friends to her party unless they bring dates. She ends up taking a personal liking to Darwin. Rachel was written out of the show beginning with season two. In "Darwin's Yearbook", it was revealed that she had gone to college; a doll of her appears in "The Rewrite".

==== Ocho Tootmorsel ====
Harry "Ocho" Tootmorsel (voiced by Max Cazier) is an 8-bit spider and a generally friendly person, but often overreacts to what people say about. He originally spoke solely in video game blips; later began speaking in comprehensible, albeit distorted, sentences. In "The Score", it is revealed that Ocho arrived to Elmore as a refugee from another planet after his father was killed, hence his mother had to smuggle him in. This, coupled with the fact that he lives a life of poverty, that his mother had to work five jobs to support him, hence he does not see her often, and the fact he is considered an outsider in both his origin and appearance, explains his anger issues.

==== The Eggheads ====
Colin and Felix (voiced by Rupert Degas in season 1 and Kerry Shale in season 2 onwards for Colin and Rupert Degas in season 1 and Hugo Harrison in season 2 onward for Felix) are a pair of egg brothers who are two of the most intelligent students. They speak with English accents and consider themselves to be much smarter than their classmates.

==== Jamie Russo ====
Jamie Russo (voiced by Jessica McDonald, seasons 1–2; Maria Teresa Creasey, season 3 onward) is a "half-cow, half-troglodyte" creature who is one of Tina's bullies. As a result of Ms. Simian holding her back a year, she is resentful of her classmates and of authority in general. She would gain a friend in the form of Anais after she works together with Jamie to expose their school's librarian, who had installed a virus in the library computers and framed the two for it. Her mother is the gym coach, whom she listens to despite her mother's disapproval of bullying.

==== William ====
William (internal monologue narrated by Mic Graves) is a flying eyeball who is Ms. Simian's personal spy and only talks when reporting information to her. He has psychic abilities. When he gets mad or uses his powers, his eye sometimes turns red and his pupil slitted.

==== Molly Collins ====
Molly Collins (voiced by Jessica McDonald) is a shy sauropod. She is a cheerleader and, as shown in "The Pressure", the owner of a treehouse where she and the other girls hang out. She made several appearances in the show's first season, but was absent for the second season until she is rescued from the Void.

==== Hot Dog Guy ====
Hot Dog Guy (voiced by Alex Jordan) is an anthropomorphic hot dog who is defined by his extreme mutual awkwardness with Gumball.

==== Clare Cooper ====
Clare Cooper (voiced by Naomi McDonald) is an emo girl who is a pinkish-grey-skinned humanoid. She has mixed opinions about Gumball and Darwin, but she is friends with Anais changing her stance towards the former two after the events of "The Others".

==== Julius Oppenheimer Jr. ====
Julius Oppenheimer Jr. (voiced by Hugo Harrison) is a bomb-headed humanoid styled after a 1920s cartoon character. He has anger issues, and his head explodes when he feels disgusted or angry. Julius is a bully; he often appears in detention or with his gang. His parents are a stick of dynamite named Julius Oppenheimer Sr. and a firework rocket, who also have a 1920s rubber hose style. Julius's name is a reference to J. Robert Oppenheimer, the "father of the atomic bomb".

=== Elmore Junior High staff ===
==== Principal Brown ====
Principal Nigel Brown (voiced by Lewis MacLeod, season 1; Steve Furst, season 2 onward) is a furry slug who is Elmore Junior High's principal and Ms Simian's love interest. He faked his diploma and does not have the educational qualifications to be a principal. He teaches music, judges cheerleader tryouts, leads the school's band, and is a substitute sports teacher. Along with Mr. Small and Ms. Simian, he used to teach gym until replaced by Coach Russo. His Cartoon Network biography states that his romance with Ms. Simian was detrimental to his profession, leaving him unable to properly run Elmore Junior High. He has a face on the back of his head similar to that of Quirinus Quirell and Lord Voldemort from Harry Potter.

==== Ms. Simian ====
Lucy Simian (voiced by Lewis MacLeod, season 1; Hugo Harrison, season 2 onward) is a 2-million-year-old baboon, the sadistic teacher of Gumball and Darwin's class as well as a major antagonist. She takes pleasure in giving her students pop quizzes. She is generally unpleasant, hates children (especially Gumball), and is hated by the student body. Principal Brown is her love interest. She has a generally antagonistic relationship with Gumball, but he begins to show respect for her in "The Teacher". Her face intentionally resembles that of the Grim Reaper.

==== Mr. Small ====
Steve Small (voiced by Lewis MacLeod, season 1; Adam Long, season 2 onward) is the Elmore Junior High guidance counselor, a cloud man who is interested in New Age culture and possesses hippie-like appearance and behavior. Mr. Small's unconventional teaching methods are usually more confusing than helpful, and students often leave his office confused. It is revealed in the episode "The Fraud" that he is not a U.S. citizen, though it is unclear if he was merely born elsewhere or renounced his citizenship. He lost his love, Janice, which in the episode "The Void" is revealed to be a purple van that runs on "good vibes". His mannerisms are similar to those of Mr. Van Driessen from Beavis and Butt-Head.

==== Rockwell "Rocky" Robinson ====
Rockwell "Rocky" Robinson (voiced by Lewis MacLeod in season 1, Hugo Harrison in season 2, and Simon Lipkin in seasons 3 onward) is an orange, fuzzy Muppet-like character who performs odd jobs, mostly as janitor, cafeteria worker, school bus driver, and, in "The Curse", the clerk at the lost and found office. He is the son of Mr. and Mrs. Robinson, the Wattersons' next-door neighbours, and is generally good-natured and gets along with the children well.

==== Coach Russo ====
Coach Russo (voiced by Dan Russell) is a large, pink 3-dimensional cube who is Jamie's mother. The newest member of the faculty, she works to ensure that all of the students are fit like her daughter. She makes her debut appearance in "The Coach" and speaks in a consistent deadpan.

==== Mr. Corneille ====
Moonchild Corneille (voiced by Simon Lipkin) is a frog and the 8th-grade teacher of geography. He pretends to be sophisticated but has a fake personality. As of "The Cage", he is in a relationship with Joan Markham, the school nurse. His picture is on all of his history books.

==== Joan Markham ====
Joan Markham (voiced by Teresa Gallagher) is the school nurse. She is in a relationship with Mr Corneille, starting in "The Cage". She hates her job. She does not know how to help the students because most of them have biologies she has no clue how to work with. She is always sarcastic because of this and tries to do the least work possible to help her students. She is also a paramedic, doctor, and nurse at a hospital, even though she hates her job. She has long blonde hair under her hat.

=== Other Watterson/Senicourt family members ===
==== Frankie Watterson ====
Frankie Watterson (voiced by Richard "Rich" Fulcher) is a rat who is a conman. He is the ex-husband of Granny Jojo and the father of Richard who abandoned them.

==== Joanna Watterson ====
Granny Jojo (voiced by Sandra Dickinson) is the Watterson children's grandmother and also Richard's mother. She is a pink rabbit who speaks in a New York accent. She was previously married to Frankie, who abandoned her and a young Richard under the pretence of going out to buy milk; She later marries Louie.

==== Louie Watterson ====
Louie Watterson (voiced by Dan Russell in season 2 and "The Kids", Shane Rimmer, season 3 to season 6; TBA, TWWWOG onwards) is a black mouse and a former member of a crew of Elmore senior citizens that includes Betty, Donald, and Marvin Finkleheimer. Now he is Granny Jojo's second husband.

==== Daniel and Mary Senicourt ====
Daniel (voiced by Clive Russell) and Mary Senicourt (voiced by Liza Ross) are Nicole's parents. Daniel shares his daughter's short-temperedness and violent tendencies; while Mary is more level-headed yet snobby. Regardless, from an early age, both parents wanted Nicole to succeed no matter the cost. These sky-high expectations eventually drove her over the edge; causing her to argue and storm away from her parents come her early adulthood to instead spend time with Richard, who would come to be her eventual husband. Neither Daniel nor Mary came to their daughter's wedding, despite being invited.

The two reunite with Nicole thanks to the latter's kids, but the reunion ends up bitter as another set of arguments began to spark. This all comes to a head when Nicole admits she was better off separated; however, her parents admit they did miss her all this time. Indeed, Nicole just wants to see them again, mending their relationship with their daughter. By the events of "The Portrait", however, Mary had been seeing a younger toucan.

==== Evil Turtle ====
Evil Turtle is a female African softshell turtle and the Watterson's former family pet purchased by Richard from a mysterious shopkeeper operating from a van. She is a recurring enemy of the Watterson family, before she laid her eggs and swam away with her children into the ocean.

=== Other characters ===
==== Mr. and Mrs. Robinson ====
Gaylord and Margaret Robinson (Gaylord voiced by Rupert Degas in season 1, Stefan Ashton Frank in season 2 onward, and Margaret voiced by Teresa Gallagher) are the Wattersons' stuck-up, grouchy, next-door neighbors, and Rocky's parents. They are grey Muppet-like characters and hate their neighbors with a passion. While Mr. Robinson is grumpy and short-tempered, Mrs. Robinson is a purely evil woman who enjoys causing suffering to others. Their constant bickering is a focal point of their relationship, and they actually enjoy doing so. Mr. Robinson owns a prized 1970 Cadillac Coupe de Ville Convertible.

==== Banana Barbara and Banana Bob ====
Banana Barbara (voiced by Sandra Searles Dickinson, Naomi McDonald) and Banana Bob (voiced by Mic Graves (Season 1 to 6; TBA TWWOG onwards) are recurring characters and the parents of Banana Joe. They are both bananas with googly eyes and lips, Bob having a mustache and Barbara having a bow. Barbara is best known for being able to predict the future in her art.

==== Harold Wilson ====
Harold Wilson (voiced by Kerry Shale) is the father of Tobias Wilson and works as a psychotherapist. He has been making fun of Richard Watterson ever since playing a prank on him in high school, as seen in "The Cycle". Harold would receive his comeuppance in "The Tracking" after Richard, who had agreed to a bet revolving fitness trackers, breaks the tracker with the help of his family and eventually sending Harold flying into a car.

==== Gary Hedges ====
Gary Hedges or Harry Gedges (voiced by Dan Russell in "The Fridge" onward) is a neighbor of the Wattersons who lives on the left side. He is a purple moose with large antlers and works as a mailman. He is commonly seen wearing a pale brown hat, green sweater with blue slacks. In "The Neighbor", it is revealed that his real name is meant to be secret and his pseudonym is Harry Gedges by which Gumball and Darwin did not know him.

==== Larry Needlemeyer ====
Larry Needlemeyer (voiced by Kerry Shale) is an origami rock, who works at almost every establishment in Elmore, including the grocery store, the gas station, the convenience store, several fast-food restaurants and the DVD rental shop. He was previously known as "Lazy Larry", the laziest person in Elmore until he lost his title to Richard and morphed into a hard worker. Larry is generally distrustful of the Wattersons, as they often get him into trouble. In "The Pizza", it is revealed that if he does not have a job, Elmore would fall into chaos. He has a girlfriend named Karen.

==== Fitzgerald Family ====
Patrick (voiced by Dan Russell) is Penny's father, Judith Fitzgerald (voiced by Maria Teresa Creasey) is the mother of Penny and Polly and is married to Patrick Fitzgerald, and Polly (voiced by Teresa Gallagher) is Penny's younger sister. They also have a pet tarantula named Mr. Cuddles. Several more members of the Fitzgerald family appear in "The Amadain", where they are revealed to also be shapeshifters hiding their true forms behind shells.

==== Marvin Finkleheimer ====
Marvin Finkleheimer (voiced by Dan Russell in season 2 onward) is a red bean who lives at a house and likes to beat kids with his cane if they help him across the street. He was originally going to be named Bert, and he is called that by the yellow old man, Donald, and Louie but that was changed/retconned by the writers.

==== Donut Cop ====
Doughnut Sheriff (voiced by Lewis MacLeod in season 1, and Dan Russell in season 2 onwards) is a pink-frosted doughnut who, as his name suggests, is an officer in Elmore's police force. During later seasons, he has more cops by his side, including Coffee Cop, Hamburger Cop, and Earl (who is a hot dog), and Fry Cops. His voice and personality is based on that of Chief Wiggum from The Simpsons.

==== Sal Left Thumb ====
Sal Left Thumb (voiced by Kerry Shale) is one of Elmore's most wanted criminals, a fingerprint whose weapon of choice is a rusty spoon, as seen in "The Spoon".

==== Felicity and Billy Parham ====
Felicity and William Geoffrey "Billy" Fitzgerald Kitchener Parham, III (voiced by Sandra Searles Dickinson season 2 onward and Teresa Gallagher in "The Kids" for Felicity and Richard Overall (Season 2 to Season 6; TBA TWWOG onwards for Billy) are an orange humanoid and a blue blob, respectively. Billy appears to be an intelligent and snobbish young boy who asks his mother random questions about life. He speaks with a sarcastic deep British voice. Felicity, while overbearing and overprotective of her son, is equally as snobbish as him, believing herself to be superior to the others in Elmore - which sparks a rivalry with Nicole. Despite this, however, the Parhams indeed have flaws: Billy did not have much friends, sans Anais, who rejected him after he expressed his hatred for Daisy the Donkey, to the point Gumball had to talk him out of his closed-mindedness; and Felicity's ego is so big, her psyche has become borderline psychotic and unstable.

==== Mr. Rex ====
Mr. Rex is Tina Rex's father who loves to eat invaders at home.

==== Mrs. Jötunheim ====
Mrs. Jötunheim (voiced by Sandra Searles Dickinson) is a green-skinned witch and the mother of Hector.

==== Mowdown ====
Phillip "Mowdown" (voiced by Simon Lipkin) is a violent giant pink teddy bear who wears a shirt with a heart on it. Mowdown is one of the more violent members of Julius' crew.

==== Kenneth ====
Kenneth is a greyish-brown monstrous blob creature created by Gumball mixing disgusting things into a jar in "The Microwave" and Richard accidentally microwaving it.

==== Carlton, Troy, and Mr. Kreese ====
Carlton and Troy (Carlton voiced by Hugo Harrison and Troy Fergus Craig) are two teenage human boys from Richwood High. Their design takes inspiration from the Saturday morning cartoons of the 1980s. Self-proclaimed masters of tennis, Carlton and Troy believe themselves to be better than Elmore, despite Gumball's general apathy towards them, their coach, Mr. Kreese (voiced by Steve Furst), the latter's playground bully attitude, and his attempts to raze Elmore Junior High to build a golf course.
