= The Shell =

2014 episode of The Amazing World of Gumball

- The Amazing World of Gumball episode
- Episode no.: Season 3 Episode 20
- Directed by: Mic Graves
- Written by: Ben Bocquelet; Guillaume Cassuto; Tom Crowley; Jon Foster; James Lamont; Howard Read; Tobi Wilson
- Production codes: GB323; 310B
- Original air date: October 9, 2014

"The Shell" is the twentieth episode of the third season of the British-American animated comedy series The Amazing World of Gumball, and the 96th episode overall. Written by series creator Ben Bocquelet, Guillaume Cassuto, Tom Crowley, Jon Foster, James Lamont, Howard Read, and Tobi Wilson, and directed by Mic Graves, it premiered on Cartoon Network on October 9, 2014.

The episode focuses on the relationship between Gumball Watterson and Penny Fitzgerald, permanently altering Penny's character design from a peanut shell into a shape-shifting entity.

== Plot ==
During a school production of Beauty and the Beast, Gumball accidentally headbutts Penny while attempting to kiss her, cracking her outer peanut shell. Backstage, Penny hides a glowing light emanating from the fracture, explaining that her father, Patrick, disapproves of revealing her true form. Patrick discovers the crack on their walk home and forbids Gumball from seeing Penny again.

Later that night, Penny visits Gumball's bedroom window to tell him her father is transferring her to another school. Gumball is outraged and encourages her to embrace her true self and break out of her shell. Penny complies, shedding her shell to reveal a glowing, shape-shifting form. Misinterpreting Gumball's stunned reaction as horror, she believes she is hideous, transforms into a monster, and runs away into Elmore.

As Penny shifts into dynamic monster forms driven by her heightened emotions, Gumball pursues her across the city. When she encounters her father and animal control officers, Gumball defends her, prompting Patrick to admit his mistake in hiding her identity. Gumball tracks Penny in her wolf form to the edge of the woods and reassures her that her physical appearance does not change how he feels about her. After he confesses his love and kisses her, Penny stabilizes into her default form in front of their families.

== Production ==
Series creator Ben Bocquelet developed "The Shell" to advance the romantic relationship between Gumball and Penny, intending to break traditional animated sitcom conventions by implementing a permanent visual and physical change for a main supporting character. Animation studio Studio Soi handled the 2D rendering, CGI elements, and compositing required to transition Penny from her original shell asset into her dynamic shape-shifting form.

== Reception ==
"The Shell" received critical acclaim for its emotional tone, character development, and animation execution. In a retrospective ranking for Screen Rant, Shawn S. Lealos and Izak Bulten listed "The Shell" as the second-best episode of the series, praising its emotional payoff and development of Gumball and Penny's relationship. Industry outlets including Animation World Network and Kidscreen covered the episode following its primary award recognition in 2016.

=== Accolades ===
At the 2016 British Animation Awards (BAA), "The Shell" won Best Children's Series and the Children's Choice Award.

Year	Award	Category	Nominee(s)	Result
2016	British Animation Awards	Best Children's Series	The Amazing World of Gumball ("The Shell")	Won
2016	British Animation Awards	Children's Choice Award	The Amazing World of Gumball ("The Shell")	Won
