= Straight (play) =

Straight is a play by the British playwright D. C. Moore. Based on the movie Humpday by Lynn Shelton, it premiered at the Sheffield Crucible in late 2012, and then transferred to the Bush Theatre in London.

The play was directed by Richard Wilson and featured the actors Philip McGinley, Henry Pettigrew, Jenny Rainsford and Jessica Ransom. It received strong reviews from the critics.
