= Jessica Ransom =

British actress and writer (born 1981)

- Born: Jessica Audrey Ransom; 1 December 1981 (age 44); Sheffield, South Yorkshire, UK
- Other name: Jess Ransom
- Education: University of Birmingham
- Occupations: Actress, writer
- Years active: 2009–present
- Television: Doc Martin (2011–2022); Horrible Histories (2011–2013, 2015– )
- Spouse: Ben Wilson (m. 2011)
- Children: 2

Jessica Audrey Ransom (born 1 December 1981) is a British actress and writer, best known for her role as medical receptionist Morwenna Newcross in the ITV drama Doc Martin (2011–2022), as well as being a writer on The Amazing World of Gumball. She won a Children's BAFTA Award in 2015.

== Early life and education ==
Ransom was born in Sheffield, England. She studied GCSE in Expressive Arts and A–Level Theatre Studies at High Storrs School in Sheffield.

== Career ==
After graduating from the University of Birmingham, Ransom did sketch writing and comedy. She appeared at the Edinburgh Festival Fringe with two pieces: "Million" and "Unsung Heroes." From 2009 to 2010, she appeared as various side characters in the sketch show The Armstrong and Miller Show. Thereafter, she appeared in the television improvisation show Fast and Loose in 2011 and that year also appeared as Morwenna Newcross, Doc Martin's medical receptionist (known for her mismatched colourful outfits) in the ITV drama Doc Martin, Ransom remaining a cast member playing that character to the series conclusion in 2022.

In the meantime, Ransom performed in other productions. Ransom took the stage, including work in the 2012 revival of Posh. Also that year, Ransom appeared in the D.C Moore play, Straight, at the Sheffield Crucible and then at the Bush Theatre in London. In 2014, Ransom voiced the role of the titular character in the second season of Poppy Cat, replacing the original voice actress, Joanna Page. She appeared in a Sky TV advertisement with Bruce Willis where she was "totally unlimited" (the advertisement was banned in 2013 for being misleading, but has been re-released with more prominent information on the pricing) and appeared in series 4 of Horrible Histories and series 6, 7 and 8 of its 2015 revival winning the 2015 Children's BAFTA Award for her role as Mary, Queen of Scots. Ransom was also a writer on The Amazing World of Gumball (seasons 3–6) and Elliott from Earth, and wrote the season 2 Danger Mouse episode "Live and Let Cry."

In the Spring of 2023 she toured in Home, I'm Darling by Laura Wade.

== Personal life ==
Ransom lives in London. She is married to producer and director Ben Wilson and they have two sons.

Ransom has run the London Marathon four times, in 2012 for Mencap, in 2014 for Age UK and in 2015 and 2017 for Bloodwise.

== Credits ==
Television and theatre roles
Year	Title	Role	Notes
2009–2010	The Armstrong and Miller Show	Various characters	
2011	Fast and Loose	Herself	
2011–2013	Horrible Histories	Various characters	
2011–2022	Doc Martin	Morwenna Newcross	
2013	Love Matters	Emily	Episode: "30 & Counting"
2013	The Escape Artist	Helen	
2014	Our Zoo	Mrs. Polly Ford	
2014–2015	Poppy Cat	Poppy Cat	Series 2, Voice only (replacing Joanna Page) for the UK production
2014–2019	The Amazing World of Gumball	Writer for seasons 3–6	
2015–present	Horrible Histories	Various characters and Writer for series 9	Winner of Children's BAFTA Award for Performer in 2015
2016	Zapped	Jess	
2018–2023	Rich Kids Go Skint	Narrator	
2021	Elliott from Earth	Writer	
2023	Love at First Sight	Bridesmaid Bertie	
2023	Home, I'm Darling	Judy	UK theatre tour
