= Mic Graves =

English animator

- Born: United Kingdom
- Occupations: Animator; director; writer; producer; voice actor
- Years active: 1998–present
- Known for: The Big Knights; Monkey Dust; The Amazing World of Gumball; Elliott from Earth

Michael "Mic" Graves is an English animator, director, producer, writer, and voice actor. He is best known as the series director for the Cartoon Network animated series The Amazing World of Gumball (2011-2019), of which he is also a writer, executive producer, and the voice of Banana Joe. He is also the co-developer, supervising director, and executive producer of the animated series Elliott from Earth (2021).

== Animation career ==
Graves first worked at Studio AKA where he worked on commercials, title sequences, and idents from 1994 to 2009; the most famous of these is The Canterbury Tales: Knight's Tale. While working at Studio AKA, he was hired to be an assistant art director on The Big Knights from 1999 to 2000. He was then hired by The Amazing World of Gumball creator Ben Bocquelet to be the series director and a writer, executive producer, and voice actor from 2011 to 2019. After the show ended in 2019, he co-created Elliott from Earth and served as a supervising director, writer, and executive producer on the series.

In January 2026, it was revealed that Mic Graves was directing and writing an animated feature film adaptation of Flat Stanley for Disney+. In March 2026, the adult-oriented computer animated horror short-film "Duck" was released for the Cartoon Network Studios shorts program Cartoon Cartoons, which was co-created by Graves with Tony Hull. The animated short centers around a tow truck driver who faces a karmic death at the hands of an old woman and her pet duck in the middle of the roads on the stormy night of the British countryside.

== Filmography ==
=== Short films ===
Year	Title	Role	Notes
1999	The Canterbury Tales: Knight's Tale	Director	

=== Films ===
Year	Title	Role	Notes
TBA	Flat Stanley	Director and writer	

=== Television ===
Year	Title	Role
1999–2000	The Big Knights	Assistant art director, artist
2003–2005	Monkey Dust	Creative director
2011–2019	The Amazing World of Gumball	Director, executive producer, writer, animation director, voice actor
2021	Elliott from Earth	Co-developer, executive producer, supervising director, writer, script editor, voice actor
2026	Cartoon Cartoons	Episode: "Duck"; Co-creator, co-writer, co-executive producer, art director, voice of Driver, voice director
