= Annie Award for Best Animated Television Production for Children =

Type of Annie Award

- Awarded for: Excellence in television animation for children
- Country: United States
- Presented by: ASIFA-Hollywood
- First award: 2003
- Currently held by: The Wonderfully Weird World of Gumball (2025)
- Website: annieawards.org

The Annie Award for Best Animated Television Production for Children is an Annie Award, awarded annually to the best animated television/broadcasting productions for children audiences. It was first given at the 31st Annie Awards.

The categories for television/broadcasting productions have gone through several name changes and divisions:

- From 1992 to 1997, there was only one award named Best Animated Television Program
- In 1998, the award was split into two categories, Outstanding Achievement in an Animated Daytime Television Program and Outstanding Achievement in an Animated Primetime or Late Night Television Program, but was eventually combined into one category again.
- In 2001, the category Best Animated Television Production for Children was created, though it was not presented in a regular way until 2007.
- In 2011, the awards for television productions were split into their current division based on the audience of the program, establishing three categories, Best General Audience Animated Television Production, Best Animated Television Production for Children and Best Animated Television Production for Preschool.

== Winners and nominees ==
=== 2000s ===
Best Animated Television Production Produced for Children

Year	Program	Studios	Network
2002 (30th)
2002 (30th)	Rolie Polie Olie	Nelvana Limited, Sparkling	Disney Channel
2002 (30th)	Rocket Power	Klasky Csupo	Nickelodeon
2002 (30th)	Kim Possible	Walt Disney Television Animation	Disney Channel
2002 (30th)	The Proud Family	Jambalaya Studios	Disney Channel
2002 (30th)	Stanley	Cartoon Pizza, Inc.	Playhouse Disney

Outstanding Achievement in an Animated Television Production Produced for Children

Year	Program	Studios	Network
2003 (31st)
2003 (31st)	The Adventures of Jimmy Neutron, Boy Genius	Nickelodeon Productions, DNA Productions	Nickelodeon
2003 (31st)	Duck Dodgers	Warner Bros. Animation	Cartoon Network
2003 (31st)	ChalkZone	Nickelodeon Animation Studio	Nickelodeon
2003 (31st)	Jakers! The Adventures of Piggley Winks	Mike Young Productions	PBS Kids
2003 (31st)	JoJo's Circus	Cartoon Pizza, Cuppa Coffee Studios	Playhouse Disney

Best Animated Television Production for Children

Year	Program	Studios	Network
2007 (35th)
2007 (35th)	El Tigre: The Adventures of Manny Rivera	Nickelodeon	Nickelodeon
2007 (35th)	Chowder	Cartoon Network Studios	Cartoon Network
2007 (35th)	Little Einsteins	Disney Channel	Playhouse Disney
2007 (35th)	The Backyardigans	Nickelodeon	Nickelodeon
2007 (35th)	Peep and the Big Wide World	Discovery Kids	Discovery Kids
2008 (36th)
2008 (36th)	Avatar: The Last Airbender	Nickelodeon	Nickelodeon
2008 (36th)	A Miser Brothers' Christmas	Warner Bros. Animation in association with ABC Family and Cuppa Coffee Studios	ABC Family
2008 (36th)	The Mighty B!	Nickelodeon	Nickelodeon
2008 (36th)	Foster's Home for Imaginary Friends	Cartoon Network Studios	Cartoon Network
2008 (36th)	Underfist: Halloween Bash	Cartoon Network Studios	Cartoon Network
2009 (37th)
2009 (37th)	The Penguins of Madagascar	Nickelodeon and DreamWorks Animation	Nickelodeon
2009 (37th)	Mickey Mouse Clubhouse	Disney Television Animation	Playhouse Disney
2009 (37th)	SpongeBob SquarePants	Nickelodeon	Nickelodeon
2009 (37th)	The Mighty B!	Nickelodeon, Polka Dot Pictures, Paper Kite Productions	Nickelodeon
2009 (37th)	The Marvelous Misadventures of Flapjack	Cartoon Network Studios	Cartoon Network

=== 2010s ===
Year	Program	Episode	Studios	Network
2010 (38th)
2010 (38th)	SpongeBob SquarePants		Nickelodeon	Nickelodeon
2010 (38th)	Adventure Time		Cartoon Network Studios	Cartoon Network
2010 (38th)	Regular Show		Cartoon Network Studios	Cartoon Network
2010 (38th)	Cloudbread		GIMC	KBS1
2010 (38th)	Fanboy & Chum Chum		Nickelodeon, Frederator	Nickelodeon
2011 (39th)
2011 (39th)	The Amazing World of Gumball		Cartoon Network in Association with Dandelion Studios, Boulder Media & Studio Soi	Cartoon Network
2011 (39th)	Fanboy & Chum Chum		Nickelodeon and Frederator	Nickelodeon
2011 (39th)	Kung Fu Panda: Legends of Awesomeness		Nickelodeon and DreamWorks Animation	Nickelodeon
2011 (39th)	The Penguins of Madagascar		Nickelodeon and DreamWorks Animation	Nickelodeon
2012 (40th)
2012 (40th)	Dragons: Riders of Berk	"How to Pick Your Dragon"	DreamWorks Animation	Cartoon Network
2012 (40th)	The Penguins of Madagascar	"Action Reaction"	Nickelodeon Animation Studio	Nickelodeon
2012 (40th)	SpongeBob SquarePants	"It's a SpongeBob Christmas!"	Nickelodeon Animation Studio	Nickelodeon
2012 (40th)	The Fairly OddParents	"Farm Pit"	Nickelodeon Animation Studio	Nickelodeon
2012 (40th)	The Legend of Korra	"Welcome to Republic City" / "A Leaf in the Wind"	Nickelodeon Animation Studio	Nickelodeon
2012 (40th)	Adventure Time	"Princess Cookie"	Cartoon Network Studios	Cartoon Network
2012 (40th)	Lego Star Wars: The Empire Strikes Out		Threshold Animation Studios	Cartoon Network
2012 (40th)	The Amazing World of Gumball	"The Job"	Cartoon Network Studio Europe	Cartoon Network
2013 (41st)
2013 (41st)	Adventure Time		Cartoon Network Studios	Cartoon Network
2013 (41st)	Gravity Falls		Disney Television Animation	Disney Channel
2013 (41st)	Kung Fu Panda: Legends of Awesomeness		Nickelodeon in association with DreamWorks Animation	Nickelodeon
2013 (41st)	The Legend of Korra		Nickelodeon	Nickelodeon
2013 (41st)	Regular Show		Cartoon Network Studios	Cartoon Network
2013 (41st)	Scaredy Squirrel		Nelvana Ltd.	Cartoon Network
2013 (41st)	Beware the Batman		Warner Bros. Animation	Cartoon Network
2013 (41st)	Teen Titans Go!		Warner Bros. Animation	Cartoon Network
2014 (42nd)
2014 (42nd)	Gravity Falls		Disney Television Animation	Disney Channel
2014 (42nd)	The Legend of Korra	"Enter the Void" / "Venom of the Red Lotus"	Nickelodeon Animation Studio	Nickelodeon
2014 (42nd)	Adventure Time		Cartoon Network Studios	Cartoon Network
2014 (42nd)	Over the Garden Wall		Cartoon Network Studios	Cartoon Network
2014 (42nd)	Wander Over Yonder		Disney Television Animation	Disney Channel
2015 (43rd)
2015 (43rd)	Wander Over Yonder	"The Breakfast"	Disney Television Animation	Disney XD
2015 (43rd)	Clarence	"Turtle Hats"	Cartoon Network Studios	Cartoon Network
2015 (43rd)	Steven Universe	"Jail Break"	Cartoon Network Studios	Cartoon Network
2015 (43rd)	Gravity Falls	"Not What He Seems"	Disney Television Animation	Disney XD
2015 (43rd)	Star vs. the Forces of Evil	"Blood Moon Ball"	Disney Television Animation	Disney XD
2015 (43rd)	Harvey Beaks	"A Day of No To-Do"	Nickelodeon Animation Studio	Nickelodeon
2015 (43rd)	Sanjay and Craig	"Street Dogg"	Nickelodeon Animation Studio	Nickelodeon
2016 (44th)
2016 (44th)	Adventure Time	"Bad Jubies"	Bix Pix Entertainment, Cartoon Network, Frederator Studios	Cartoon Network
2016 (44th)	Voltron: Legendary Defender	"Return of the Gladiator"	DreamWorks Animation	Netflix
2016 (44th)	Elena of Avalor	"A Day to Remember"	Disney Television Animation	Disney Channel
2016 (44th)	Teenage Mutant Ninja Turtles	"Trans-Dimensional Turtles"	Nickelodeon	Nickelodeon
2016 (44th)	SpongeBob SquarePants	"Snail Mail"	Nickelodeon	Nickelodeon
2016 (44th)	Wander Over Yonder	"My Fair Hatey"	Disney Television Animation	Disney XD
2017 (45th)
2017 (45th)	We Bare Bears	"Panda's Art"	Cartoon Network Studios	Cartoon Network
2017 (45th)	Buddy Thunderstruck	"To Protect and Swerve" / "Robo-Truck of the Future"	Stoopid Buddy Stoodios and American Greetings for Netflix	Netflix
2017 (45th)	Lost in Oz	"The Pearl of Pinagree"	Amazon Studios	Amazon Prime Video
2017 (45th)	Niko and the Sword of Light	"From the Cliffs of Catastrophe to the Pools of Destiny"	Amazon Studios	Amazon Prime Video
2017 (45th)	Tangled: The Series	"Queen for a Day"	Disney Television Animation	Disney Channel
2018 (46th)
2018 (46th)	Hilda	"Chapter 1: The Hidden People"	Hilda Productions Limited, a Silvergate Media Company, Netflix Inc. and Mercury Filmworks	Netflix
2018 (46th)	Rise of the Teenage Mutant Ninja Turtles	"Mystic Mayhem"	Nickelodeon Animation Studio	Nickelodeon
2018 (46th)	Tales of Arcadia: Trollhunters	"The Eternal Knight Pt. 2"	DreamWorks Animation Television	Netflix
2018 (46th)	Kung Fu Panda: The Paws of Destiny	"Enter the Dragon Master"	DreamWorks Animation Television	Amazon Prime Video
2018 (46th)	Little Big Awesome	"Puppy Shower"	Amazon Studios	Amazon Prime Video
2019 (47th)
2019 (47th)	Mickey Mouse		Disney Television Animation / Disney Channel	Disney Channel
2019 (47th)	Niko and the Sword of Light		Titmouse, Inc., Amazon Studios	Amazon Prime Video
2019 (47th)	Rise of the Teenage Mutant Ninja Turtles		Nickelodeon Animation Studio	Nickelodeon
2019 (47th)	3Below: Tales of Arcadia		DreamWorks Animation	Netflix
2019 (47th)	The Tom and Jerry Show		Warner Bros. Animation	Boomerang

=== 2020s ===
Year	Program	Episode	Studios	Network
2020 (48th)
2020 (48th)	Hilda	"Chapter 9: The Deerfox"	Silvergate Media for Netflix	Netflix
2020 (48th)	Rise of the Teenage Mutant Ninja Turtles	"Finale Part 4: Rise"	Nickelodeon Animation Studio	Nickelodeon
2020 (48th)	She-Ra and the Princesses of Power	"Heart" (Part 2)	DreamWorks Animation	Netflix
2020 (48th)	Star Wars: The Clone Wars	"Shattered"	Lucasfilm Animation	Disney+
2020 (48th)	Victor and Valentino	"Lonely Haunts Club 3: La Llorona"	Cartoon Network Studios	Cartoon Network
2021 (49th)
2021 (49th)	Maya and the Three	"The Sun and the Moon"	Netflix	Netflix
2021 (49th)	Amphibia	"True Colors"	Disney Television Animation	Disney Channel
2021 (49th)	Carmen Sandiego	"The Himalayan Rescue Caper"	Houghton Mifflin Harcourt Publishing and DHX Media for Netflix	Netflix
2021 (49th)	Dug Days	"Science"	Pixar Animation Studios	Disney+
2021 (49th)	We the People	"Active Citizenship"	Laughing Wild, Higher Ground Productions, Netflix	Netflix
2022 (50th)
2022 (50th)	Abominable and the Invisible City	"Everest Returns"	DreamWorks Animation	Peacock/Hulu
2022 (50th)	Big Nate	"The Legend of the Gunting"	Nickelodeon Animation Studio	Paramount+
2022 (50th)	Moominvalley	"Lonely Mountain"	Gutsy Animations	Yle TV2/Sky Max
2022 (50th)	The Owl House	"King's Tide"	Disney Television Animation	Disney Channel
2022 (50th)	We Baby Bears	"The Real Crayon"	Cartoon Network Studios	Cartoon Network
2023 (51st)
2023 (51st)	Hilda	Chapter 8: The Fairy Isle	Hilda Productions Limited, a Silvergate Media Company, Netflix Inc., and Mercury Filmworks	Netflix
2023 (51st)	Curses!	"The Baboon Temple"	DreamWorks Animation	Apple TV+
2023 (51st)	Marvel's Moon Girl and Devil Dinosaur	"The Beyonder"	Flying Bark Productions / Disney Television Animation	Disney Channel
2023 (51st)	My Dad the Bounty Hunter	"Bizarre Ride"	A Netflix Series	Netflix
2023 (51st)	Shape Island	"Square's Special Place"	Bix Pix Entertainment in association with Apple	Apple TV+
2024 (52nd)
2024 (52nd)	Marvel's Moon Girl and Devil Dinosaur	"The Molecular Level"	Flying Bark Productions, Disney Television Animation, Disney Branded Television	Disney Channel
2024 (52nd)	Gremlins: The Wild Batch	"Never Use Double Negatives"	Warner Bros. Animation	Max
2024 (52nd)	Jurassic World: Chaos Theory	"Batten Down the Hatches"	DreamWorks Animation	Netflix
2024 (52nd)	Primos	"Summer of Tater Luna"	Disney Television Animation, Disney Branded Television	Disney Channel
2024 (52nd)	WondLa	"Ruins"	Skydance Animation	Apple TV+
2025 (53rd)
2025 (53rd)	The Wonderfully Weird World of Gumball	"The Rewrite"	Hanna-Barbera Studios Europe	Hulu
2025 (53rd)	My Melody & Kuromi	"All For Our Best Friend"	Sanrio Company for Netflix	Netflix
2025 (53rd)	Spice Frontier: Escape From Veltegar	"Episode1"	Steamroller Animation	YouTube
2025 (53rd)	Tales of the Teenage Mutant Ninja Turtles	"Rise of the Night Ninja"	Nickelodeon Animation Studios and Point Grey Pictures	Paramount+
2025 (53rd)	Wylde Pak	"Sungandeul"	Nickelodeon Animation Studios, Jam Filled Entertainment)	Nickelodeon

== See also ==
- Daytime Emmy Award for Outstanding Children's Animated Program
