= Elliott from Earth =

- Genre: Science fiction Comedy; Adventure
- Created by: Guillaume Cassuto
- Developed by: Guillaume Cassuto; Mic Graves; Tony Hull
- Directed by: Rhys Byfield; Mikey Please
- Voices of: Samuel Faraci; Noah Bentley; Naomi McDonald
- Theme music composer: Xav Clarke
- Composer: Xav Clarke
- Country of origin: United Kingdom
- Original language: English
- No. of seasons: 1 (2 chapters)
- No. of episodes: 16

Production
- Executive producers: Mic Graves; Sarah Fell; Patricia Hidalgo
- Producers: Sarah Fell; Emma Fernando
- Editor: Tony Hull
- Running time: 11 minutes
- Production company: Cartoon Network Studios Europe

Original release
- Network: Cartoon Network
- Release: March 29 – April 9, 2021

Related
- The Amazing World of Gumball; The Heroic Quest of the Valiant Prince Ivandoe; The Wonderfully Weird World of Gumball

Elliott from Earth is a British animated television series created by Guillaume Cassuto and developed by Cassuto, Mic Graves, and Tony Hull for Cartoon Network. Produced by Cartoon Network Studios Europe, the show follows an 11-year-old boy named Elliott and his mother Frankie, who travel around Earth to study 65-million-year-old rock meteorites. After discovering a meteorite with no fusion crust, they accidentally power it up, causing it to turn into a transport sphere that launches them into the other side of the Universe. They end up on a large space station called the Centrium, where they meet a dinosaur named Mo, who lost the rock in the wilderness of a biosphere. Later, the three of them investigate their new environment and meet its alien inhabitants, eventually making their way into the city on the space station, where they find a new home for themselves. In Centrium City, the trio continues to get accustomed to the ways of life there and explore the wonders of their new home.

It was first announced, greenlit and pitched in July 2018 for 20 episodes, from the team who previously worked on The Amazing World of Gumball. After starting its production in September of that year, in December 2019, series creator Guillaume Cassuto announced his departure from Cartoon Network, doing it in October. Replaced by Mic Graves and Tony Hull, who served from that point on as showrunners of the show. After its release was slated from 2020 to the following year, the show debuted in the United Kingdom and Africa on March 6, 2021. In the United States, it premiered on March 29 and ended its air on April 9, 2021. On September 10, 2021, the series was added to the streaming service HBO Max, though it was later removed from the platform on August 17, 2022. Despite being received positively by critics, the show was cancelled after its first season due to lack of marketing and poor viewership.

== Premise ==
Eleven-year-old Elliott and his geologist mother Frankie travel around looking for meteorites on Earth, so that Frankie can further study a 65-million-year-old rock which appears to be from space but lacks a fusion crust. One night, the two accidentally power up the rock, revealing it to be alien technology that can turn into a transport sphere and launch into space. The sphere transports them to another side of the Universe, where they end up on a large space station called the Centrium. There, they meet a dinosaur who names himself Mo, and end up losing the rock in the wilderness of a biosphere. The three of them investigate their new environment and meet its alien inhabitants, eventually making their way into the city on the Centrium where they find a new home for themselves. In Centrium City, the trio continues to get accustomed to the ways of life there and explore the wonders of their new home, while Frankie continues her search for answers about the mysterious rock.

== Characters ==
=== Protagonists ===
- Elliott (voiced by Samuel Faraci) – An 11-year-old boy who longs to make friends, and finds one in Mo. He is curious and adventurous, and often ends up in strange dilemmas when he does not think things through.
- Mo (voiced by Noah Bentley) – A nearsighted Stegosaurus who can talk and apparently came from Earth as well. He does not know much about himself—or anything for that matter—but learns quickly. He wears a pair of round, blue glasses previously owned and worn by Frankie. Near the start of the series, he names himself after Elliott's aunt, Maureen "Mo".
- Frankie (voiced by Naomi McDonald) – A 36-year-old single mother of Elliott who is a geologist hoping to study the existence of extraterrestrials. She wears a pair of round, red glasses. Though she often has a logical and scientific approach to things, she still acts on impulse from time to time when driven by her determination to explore and discover.

=== Aliens ===
- 105E (voiced by Diane Morgan) – 105E is the first droid Elliott and Frankie meet on the Centrium, as she helps them find out answers as to how they arrived. Dry-witted and impish, she also has the ability to project the memories of others.
- Hive Director (voiced by Angelina Ispani) – Although she looks like a child the Hive Director is really much older as her species ages in reverse, giving her more wisdom than most and making her ideal to run the Hive, the hub of learning on the Centrium.
- Lord Kallous the Merciless (voiced by Stephen Greif) – Lord Kallous the Merciless, or 'Mr. K' to his students, has put his past as an intergalactic tyrant behind him. After the destruction of his homeworld (it was only partially his fault), his new life on the Centrium means he often finds himself struggling with an enemy far greater than anything he has faced before: school kids and middle management.
  - You (voiced by Mic Graves) – Lord Kallous' last henchman.
- Gym (voiced by Jessie Lawrence) – A fan of herbs and spices, discipline and authority, the Chef runs the lunchroom on the Hive, and teaches Elliott and Mo about the diverse range of things to eat in space, as well as giving them advice on how to stop it from wriggling away.
- Kane (voiced by Rich Hall) – Kane is a gruff two-faced alien who isn't having the best day when he meets the visitors from Earth, and he has to use all his wit and cunning to help them navigate them through their strange new environment.
- Mrs. Argolis (voiced by Teresa Gallagher, Naomi McDonald, and Jessica McDonald) – Mrs. Argolis is Elliott and Frankie's three-headed next-door neighbour who seems to have an issue with nearly everything. Not one for keeping their own noise levels down, they're more than happy to give their opinions on things, even when they're not asked.
- Nara (voiced by Mandeep Dhillon) – Elliott and Mo's friend Nara is very good at planning for the future. Whilst she has a mischievous streak, Elliott and Mo can't wait to get to know her to see what she can do with her special ability.
- Preston – Preston takes life at a slower pace than Elliott and Mo's other friends, but that doesn't stop him from having fun on the Centrium, with him being known for playing pranks on unsuspecting victors from time to time.
- Earmouse (voiced by Tony Hull) – Earmouse is Elliott and Mo's classmate, who doesn't let his tiny size hold him back. Despite his natural squeamishness, he's always ready to put himself into a new situation, even though he's usually putting himself in further danger.
- Invisibill – Bill lacks visibility, but makes up for it in confidence, though often what he says isn't as useful as he thinks.
- Steve – Steve doesn't let the fact he only has a mouth stop him. Unfortunately, not everyone else agrees, as the wrong things often go in and out of it without Steve knowing.
- Vax and Vox – Vax and Vox have escaped from Planet X and now spend all their time together on the Centrium. They have plenty in common, including size, shape, colour, name, interests, and special abilities, but they can't understand why everyone keeps asking if they are related.

=== Casts ===
- David Baddiel
- Saul Bearryman
- Gyles Brandreth
- Maria Teresa Creasey
- Simon Day
- Mandeep Dhillon
- Ashton Leon Frank
- Stefan Ashton Frank
- Teresa Gallagher
- Mic Graves
- Stephen Greif
- Rich Hall
- Hugo Harold-Harrison
- Steven Hartley
- Tony Hull
- Angelina Ispani
- Alex Jordan
- Eve Karpf
- Lorelei King
- Jessie Lawrence
- Phyllis Logan
- Adam Long
- Jessica McDonald
- Diane Morgan
- Naoko Mori
- James O'Brien
- Richard Overall
- Rob Rackstraw
- Dan Russell
- Kerry Shale
- Jack Simmons
- Craig Stein
- David Warner

== Episodes ==
Every episode was directed by Rhys Byfield and Mikey Please, with Mic Graves and Tony Hull serving as supervising directors. Each episode of the show lasts for 11 minutes.

Chapter	Episodes	Originally released	
Chapter	Episodes	First released	Last released
Chapter One	4	March 29, 2021	
Chapter Two	12	March 30, 2021	April 9, 2021

No.	Title	Written by	Storyboarded by	Original release date	Prod. code	U.S. viewers (millions)
Chapter One: The Journey Begins
1	"Wednesday"	Mic Graves & Tony Hull; Joe Markham & Joe Parham (part 1 only)	Oliver Hamilton	March 29, 2021	101	0.15
2	"Wednesday"	Mic Graves & Tony Hull; Joe Markham & Joe Parham (part 1 only)	Oliver Hamilton	March 29, 2021	102	0.15
3	"Wednesday"	Mic Graves & Tony Hull; Joe Markham & Joe Parham (part 1 only)	Oliver Hamilton & David Vinicombe	March 29, 2021	103	0.15
4	"Wednesday"	Mic Graves & Tony Hull; Joe Markham & Joe Parham (part 1 only)	Constance Bouckaert & Eva Figueroa	March 29, 2021	104	0.15
Part 1: Elliott and his geologist mom, Frankie, travel in their RV. Frankie continues trying to find someone who will take her theory of extraterrestrial life seriously, while Elliott's attempts to make friends is stifled by their constant moving. After another failed excursion on both parts, resulting in Elliott speaking up about his frustration with having to move so often, the two of them suddenly learn that the meteorite they own has something important to show them. Upon realizing that the meteorite is seemingly returning to wherever it came from, Elliott and Frankie decide to go with it in search of the answers they've been seeking, and are launched into space with it. Part 2: Elliott and Frankie are transported by their meteorite to a swamp area full of alien plants and "talking", electric frog-like creatures called babbledrogs, where they end up losing the meteorite. They later meet a nearsighted talking dinosaur who names himself Mo, after Elliott's aunt. As Elliott and Frankie enjoy the flora and fauna of their new environment, asking questions about it and getting to know their new dinosaur friend, they spot a small robotic creature and give chase through the strange environment in the hopes of catching it. Meanwhile, the meteorite is charged by a small electric pulse given off by a babbledrog. Part 3: The group meets a two-headed alien maintenance worker named Kane, and learn that they are in a biosphere within a large space station. They are aided by Kane, who tries to hide them from his boss, as they make their way out of the biosphere. Elliott and Frankie also learn that Mo is apparently from Earth but had been living in the biosphere for his whole life. This confuses Kane, who tells them that Mo was not supposed to be in the biosphere, leading Elliott and Frankie to wonder how Mo got there in the first place. After Kane helps the trio sneak past his boss and out of the maintenance tunnels, he sends them on their way to a vast, futuristic city area. Part 4: The group gets lost in their new city environment, and soon become desperate for a place to stay as night falls. After turning down an offer from a creepy-looking alien, they take up the offer of a kindly old lady who invites them into her home. The lady, however, turns out to actually be a gorgon who lures people into her house and turns them into ice sculptures. After curbing her habit and gaining their freedom, the group decides to take the creepy-looking stranger's previous offer, and receive new habitation pods to live in with interiors that exactly resemble their old homes.
Chapter Two: A New Home
5	"Idiosyncratic Induction"	Mic Graves & Tony Hull	Eva Figueroa	March 30, 2021	105	0.22
Elliott and Frankie are taken to the Hive, the school-like hub of knowledge on the Centrium, with Mo following them there. While Frankie is taken away for lecturing, Elliott is shown around by the infant-like Hive Director and taken to a class of students. However, he worries about not fitting in with them due to his bad past experiences with schools on Earth, but Mo is there to make sure he makes friends quickly. The two of them try introducing themselves to the class, and are quickly accepted by the other students, who are eager to meet them. They then meet the former-warlord Kallous, who appears threatening at first but ends up being their teacher.
6	"Memory Mayhem"	Mic Graves, Tony Hull & Richard Overall	Constance Bouckaert & Eva Figueroa	March 30, 2021	106	0.24
Simultaneously occurring with the previous episode's events, Frankie is taken by a droid named 105E to "give" a lecture about Earth to an entity composed of many individuals working together called the Head of the Hive. When she mentions the meteorite that brought her and Elliott there and the Head becomes interested in it, she must get 105E and her mutualite—a creature with a symbiotic relationship to 105E, who has the ability to look at memories—to show her memory of the rock to them before they run out of time. Ultimately, they are just a few moments too late and are unable to show the memory of the rock to the Head. After a discovery about the circumstances of their crash-landing, though, the Head reveals that it will be able to send droids to search through part of the biosphere, and that they may be able to find the rock after all. Meanwhile, in the biosphere, babbledrogs continue to inadvertently charge the rock through their natural electricity.
7	"Developing Dilemma"	Guillaume Cassuto, Mic Graves, Tony Hull, Daran Johnson, Joe Markham, Joe Parham & Jess Ransom	Juanpe Arroyo & Eva Figueroa	March 31, 2021	107	0.18
Elliott gets a new pet that resembles a minuscule blob. Meanwhile, Frankie meets her three-headed neighbor, Mrs. Argolis, who has a habit of belittling people. She tries to befriend them over coffee, but Elliott's new pet suddenly increases in size and soon flees with their neighbor in its grasp, resulting in Elliott and Frankie having to rescue her. Elliott eventually realizes that the pet appears to feed on others' negativity and grows as a result, and convinces Mrs. Argolis to try being nice so that it shrinks back down to its regular docile size. Afterward, Mrs. Argolis continues to be a bit kinder to the two of them, suggesting they could visit and share another coffee sometime soon.
8	"Inadvertent Inversion"	Mic Graves, Tony Hull & Richard Overall	Eva Figueroa, Chuck Klein & Oliver Hamilton	March 31, 2021	108	0.19
While at the Hive, Elliott and Mo attend a food class taught by an alien named Gym. Meanwhile, Frankie meets the Director's husband, who runs the day-to-day functions of the Hive. After the Director and her husband leave for a moment, Frankie accidentally activates the controls to the entire building, causing everything to suddenly shift on its axis. Frankie tries to fix it using the controls, while Elliott and Mo attempt to do the same in another room by reaching a reset lever. Eventually the Hive Director returns in the middle of the chaos, and shows Frankie how to fix the building's orientation by simply adjusting how she holds the controls. After the situation is resolved and Gym's class ends, Frankie leaves alongside the Hive Director, telling her that she's still taking some time to get used to the ways of life on the Centrium.
9	"Regurgitated Reminiscence"	Guillaume Cassuto, Mic Graves, Tony Hull, Joe Markham & Joe Parham	Bianca Ansems	April 1, 2021	109	0.19
Elliott accidentally breaks Frankie's coffee machine and, despite buying a newer one, is still tasked with trying to get the old one back after he threw it away. He and Mo go to a service that can recreate it through an alien's ability to generate items from memories, but the memory is blurred due to Elliott never paying much attention to the coffee machine before. They then go to the recycling plant, where they find other discarded machines and droids. Upon finding the coffee machine, one of the discarded machines tells them that they must escape before they are dumped into an incinerator. After making their escape, though, they find that there was never any danger to begin with and that the machine lied about it. The workers at the recycling plant then fix the coffee machine for Elliott, and are able to repair the other discarded machines and droids as well.
10	"Chaotic Clumping"	Guillaume Cassuto, Mic Graves, Tony Hull, Daran Johnson, Joe Markham, Richard Overall & Mikey Please	Oliver Hamilton	April 1, 2021	110	0.18
After missing the school bus, Elliott and Mo decide to take a teleportation machine to school so that they are not late. They go in together, and end up merged into one by it. While at first uncomfortable and awkward in their new predicament, they soon end up loving it when they believe they are twice as strong together. However, things soon begin to go wrong as they start to have disagreements, and their teacher, Lord Kallous, demands that only one of them take credit for their recent test. This results in the two getting into an argument over who will get an F on the test, and wanting to split. When they see two-headed aliens splitting up in the same way and notice that all of the duos hate each other, Mo begins to worry that it means Elliott must hate him in the same way. Elliott reassures him and decides that they do not have to split after all, saying that he'd rather be uncomfortable merged with Mo than risk losing him forever. They return to Kallous to tell him the news, only for Kallous to tell them that they were never merged—only stuck in the same clothing. In the end, they still decide to both take the F on the test, together.
11	"Parallel Paradox"	Guillaume Cassuto, Mic Graves, Tony Hull, Daran Johnson & Richard Overall	Juanpe Arroyo	April 2, 2021	111	0.26
After getting inspired by a friendly encounter Frankie had, Elliott decides to do a random good deed for a stranger, but accidentally schedules his afternoon with two events at once: a going-away party for a stranger named Dugg, and helping with an event at a hot dog stand. With Mo's help, Elliott utilizes a hologram to be in two places at once, which turns out to be rather difficult. Eventually he begins to figure it out, even managing to successfully give a speech to both parties at once. However, Mo ends up accidentally revealing that Elliott is using a hologram, and Elliott comes forward with the truth about it. Other attendees at Dugg's party, and Dugg himself, turn out to be using similar methods to "attend" it without actually being there, much like Elliott did. Despite his plan with the hologram not working the way he'd expected, things still end up working out for both sides of Elliott's afternoon.
12	"Problematic Prophecies"	Guillaume Cassuto, Mic Graves, Tony Hull, Daran Johnson, Joe Markham, Joe Parham & Jess Ransom	Eva Figueroa	April 5, 2021	112	0.24
Elliott and Mo are impressed by their classmate Nara's ability to see the future, a power that she is bored with. They agree to exchange abilities, with Elliott and Mo giving her talents of theirs and receiving her power to see the future. The two of them walk through the city and use their new powers around town, fascinated at first but quickly growing bored from already knowing everything that will happen. Suddenly, they discover that Nara is about to be caught in a fatal accident, and they work together to try and find a possible future outcome to rescue her from it. Though at first it seems that they end up failing, it turns out that Nara was able to use Mo's talent—bending backwards for limbo—to narrowly avoid the accident and save herself. Afterward, Elliott and Mo beg Nara to re-exchange abilities with them, and she agrees to take her powers back.
13	"Temporal Tedium"	Guillaume Cassuto, Adam Hess, Daran Johnson, Joe Markham, Joe Parham & Jess Ransom	Guillaume Cassuto & David de Rooij	April 6, 2021	113	0.25
Elliott and Mo decide to befriend Preston, a small green slime ball alien who moves, talks and responds slowly. After trying to include him in the day's activities, though, they soon realize that he's too slow for them, but accidentally hurt his feelings when they later say it aloud without realizing that he's listening. Preston decides to throw away the necklace he wears, which turns out to be what slowed him down, but begins to rapidly age as a result. Elliott, Mo and Preston enter the Centrium's trash dump to find it, but must avoid a large garbage-eating monster and get the necklace back before Preston reaches the end of his lifespan. Elliott successfully retrieves it, but appears to be too late when Preston reaches the end of his life and turns to dust. For a moment, Elliott is distraught that he seemingly killed Preston, before he and Mo watch as Preston regenerates himself as an infant. Preston reveals to them that it was all a prank, since his species has the ability to regenerate. Elliott and Mo return the necklace to Preston once he has aged back to his usual state, and they agree to keep being friends.
14	"Companion Confusion"	Guillaume Cassuto, Daran Johnson, Joe Markham, Joe Parham, Mikey Please & Jess Ransom	Guillaume Cassuto & Marylene Sun	April 7, 2021	114	0.21
After seeing a romantic superhero movie, Elliott and Mo believe they need to find "the one" for themselves or else they'll be unhappy. With all of their knowledge of it coming from films and TV, their attempts include recreating cliché scenes from romance films, asking the guidance counselor for advice, and looking for someone opposite to them, but ultimately nothing works. Their final attempt is to put themselves in apparent danger so "the one" will save them, just like in the superhero movie they saw earlier, but reality ensues when they end up causing a real disaster instead. In a parallel to the movie from the episode's beginning, Mo ventures into the chaos and saves Elliott. After the disaster, Elliott and Mo realize that there is no "one" who will randomly show up to save them because that's only something in movies and TV shows. Satisfied with this conclusion and no longer concerned, they then agree that they should leave after causing a mess. As they move on, an emergency responder watches them, and remarks that the duo is "perfect for each other".
15	"Melancholic Megalomaniac"	Guillaume Cassuto, Mic Graves, Tony Hull, Daran Johnson, Joe Markham, Joe Parham & Jess Ransom	Juanpe Arroyo & Eva Figueroa	April 8, 2021	115	0.19
After accidentally causing major damage to the school washroom, Elliott and Mo are surprised to see that Lord Kallous is feeling too miserable to do his job as a teacher. Hoping to cheer him up, they go to his home to see him, but instead meet his henchman. There, they learn about Kallous's past as a tyrant, including that he once knew someone named Prince Cryon. Upon learning this, Elliott and Mo assume that Kallous must be upset because he misses Cryon. They manage to make a clone of Cryon with help from a friend of theirs, and plan to bring Cryon to a surprise meeting with Kallous at a fancy restaurant. However, Cryon turns out to be Kallous' arch-enemy, and the two of them start to fight to the death. When Kallous begins to win the fight, Elliott and Mo hurriedly help Cryon escape just before he is destroyed. Kallous, unaware that Cryon escaped and believing that he successfully defeated his arch-enemy at last, is cheered up after all and returns to his usual menacing self. Meanwhile, Cryon ventures into the city to explore the new world he's found himself in.
16	"Diminishing Discourse"	Mic Graves, Tony Hull & Richard Overall	Constance Bouckaert & Oliver Hamilton	April 9, 2021	116	0.17
Elliott and Frankie tell Mo the truth about what happened to the dinosaurs, upsetting him greatly and leading to a falling-out between them when Mo roars at Elliott for the first time. Afterward, Elliott and Frankie notice that everyone on the Centrium suddenly cannot speak the same language anymore, and soon learn that it was caused by a problem with the babbledrogs. Elliott and Frankie decide to go into the biosphere that they first crash-landed in, where they meet 105E and discover that something has paralyzed nearly all of the babbledrogs in there, keeping the creatures from "creating language" for the Centrium. As they travel through the biosphere, Elliott finds the place where he first met Mo, and feels concerned and upset about what happened earlier. Soon, Elliott and Frankie discover that their lost meteorite is the cause of the problems when they find it surrounded by a huge pile of paralyzed babbledrogs. Mo, who appears after following them there earlier, is able to recover the lost meteorite and makes up with Elliott when they reunite. However, as Mo shows Frankie the meteorite, Frankie accidentally activates it. The meteorite turns into the transport sphere again with Frankie and Mo inside, and says that it is taking the two of them to Mo's "home". Frankie promises to come back for Elliott just before being launched out of the biosphere and into space, leaving Elliott stunned.

== Production ==
Elliott from Earth was first announced on July 2, 2018, when it was greenlit and pitched for 20 episodes by Cartoon Network Studios Europe, consisting mostly of the production team from Cartoon Network's The Amazing World of Gumball. Starting production in September 2018, the series creator, Guillaume Cassuto expressed that he had the idea of the show a while ago, which he could materialize after gaining experience on Gumball's production. Sarah Fell, a producer of The Amazing World of Gumball, was confirmed to be a creative director for Elliott from Earth and a director for overseeing the development and production of all Turner Kids series across Cartoon Network Studios Europe in January 2019. Alongside its CEO, Patricia Hidalgo. In December, Guillaume Cassuto announced on his Twitter that in October he left the series due to parting ways with Cartoon Network. Mic Graves and Tony Hull, who also worked on The Amazing World of Gumball, took over his role on the production. The show's music was provided by one of Gumball's composers, Xav Clarke.

== Broadcast ==
The show was meant to be released in 2020, but it was delayed to the following year, in September, where it debuted on Cartoon Network UK and Cartoon Network Africa in the United Kingdom and Africa at on March 6, 2021. On Cartoon Network in United States, it premiered on March 29. It premiered on Cartoon Network Poland on May 24, 2021, and on Cartoon Network Latin America on May 15, 2023. The first episodes were also released on the Cartoon Network app, website, and VOD on March 22, 2021.

On September 10, 2021, the series was added to the streaming service HBO Max. On August 17, 2022, it was announced that the HBO Max would be removing several series, including Elliott from Earth. The series was ended after first season. (Note: There were still three episodes left produced that went unaired.) Due to lack of marketing, and poor viewership resulted the show's struggle to gain audience's attention, and its cancellation.

== Reception ==
=== Critical reception ===
The show was well received from critics. Jade Budowski of Decider, said that show is "Colorful, big-hearted, and engaging, Elliott from Earth - while not as educational as some of the other children's programming out there - is a sheer delight." Joyce Slaton of Common Sense Media gave the show 4 out of 5 stars; writing that "Some scenes may be too scary for younger or more sensitive viewers" and that the "Language is kept to a bare minimum and there's no other mature content to question". But she argued that "takes advantage of its scientific setting to transmit facts, too - the difference between types of meteorites, background on the Voyager 1 probe, and so forth". At the end she described the show as a "[s]weet cosmic fantasy" that "promotes tolerance, curiosity, [and] courage".

==== LGBTQ representation ====
In the second part of the four-part episode "Wednesday", Frankie, one of the main protagonists of the series, mentions that she and her unnamed wife gave birth to Elliott, revealing Frankie as a lesbian.

=== Nominations ===
Year	Award	Category	Nominee(s)	Result	Ref.
2022	BFE Cut Above Award	Best Edited Animated series	Tony Hull, Richard Overall	Nominated	

== See also ==
- The Amazing World of Gumball
- The Heroic Quest of the Valiant Prince Ivandoe
- The Wonderfully Weird World of Gumball
