= Sarah Fell (producer) =

British animation producer

- Education: National Film and Television School
- Occupations: Animation producer, executive
- Employer: Hanna-Barbera Studios Europe
- Known for: The Amazing World of Gumball

Sarah Fell is a British animation producer and executive. She is Vice President of Original Animation EMEA at Hanna-Barbera Studios Europe (formerly Cartoon Network Studios Europe). She is best known as the producer and executive producer of the Cartoon Network animated series The Amazing World of Gumball.

== Career ==
Fell graduated from the National Film and Television School (NFTS) and began her career as an animation director at Absolutely Productions. She then spent seven years at Aardman Animations, producing programmes in 2D, 3D and stop-motion animation. Her credits there include Planet Sketch, Big Jeff and Timmy Time; the last of these won a BAFTA Children's Award for Pre-School Animation.

Fell subsequently joined Cartoon Network Development Studio Europe, where she became producer of The Amazing World of Gumball from its second season and later its executive producer. The series won several BAFTA Children's Awards during its run. During this period she also served as an executive producer on other studio projects, including The Heroic Quest of the Valiant Prince Ivandoe and Turner EMEA's first Boomerang original, The Happos Family.

In January 2019, Turner EMEA promoted Fell to Director of Original Series, Kids EMEA, with responsibility for the region's original kids' series, including Elliott from Earth. After the studio was rebranded as Hanna-Barbera Studios Europe in April 2021, she continued to oversee original kids and family animation for the region.

In September 2021, a Gumball revival series and finale film were announced for HBO Max and Cartoon Network. In July 2022, it was announced that Fell would oversee the development of new versions of The Powerpuff Girls and Foster's Home for Imaginary Friends with their creator, Craig McCracken. At the 2024 Annecy International Animation Film Festival, Fell, then Senior Vice President of Series at Hanna-Barbera Studios Europe, joined creator Ben Bocquelet and members of the production team to present a behind-the-scenes look at the Gumball revival. In a July 2024 restructuring at Warner Bros. Discovery, her title was confirmed as Vice President of Original Animation EMEA, reporting to Sam Register.

The revival, retitled The Wonderfully Weird World of Gumball, premiered on Hulu in the United States on 28 July 2025; Fell is an executive producer. In November 2025, it was announced that she would executive produce Living the Dream, an adult animated workplace sitcom created by George Gendi for Netflix.

== Filmography ==
=== Television ===
Year	Title	Role	Notes
2005–2008	Planet Sketch	Producer	
2006	Big Jeff	Producer	
2009–2012	Timmy Time	Producer	Won the BAFTA Children's Award for Pre-School Animation
2012–2019	The Amazing World of Gumball	Producer, executive producer	From season 2 onward
2016–2018	The Happos Family	Executive producer	
2017–2023	The Heroic Quest of the Valiant Prince Ivandoe	Executive producer	
2021	Elliott from Earth	Executive producer	
2025–present	The Wonderfully Weird World of Gumball	Executive producer	
2026	Living the Dream	Executive producer	
