= ISCI =

ISCI may refer to:

- Islamic Supreme Council of Iraq
- Industry Standard Coding Identification
- International State Crime Initiative
