= CAID =

Caid may refer to:

- Qaid (also caid or kaid), various forms of responsible official found in places ranging from the Kingdom of Sicily to rural North Africa
- Caid (sport), a form of football popular in Ireland until the mid-19th century
- The Kingdom of Caid, a regional area of the Society for Creative Anachronism

CAID as an abbreviation may refer to:

- Computer-aided industrial design
- Contemporary Art Institute of Detroit
- Conditional Access Identification
- CAID (technology), a Chinese advertising technology for tracking users
