= Identifier for Advertisers =

Unique identifier tied to an Apple device

The Identifier for Advertisers (IDFA) is a unique random device identifier that American information technology company Apple generates and assigns to every device. It is intended to be used by advertisers to deliver personalized ads and attribute ad interactions for ad retargeting. Users can opt-out of IDFA via the "Limit Ad Tracking" (LAT) setting (and an estimated 20% do).

Starting in iOS 14.5, iPadOS 14.5, and tvOS 14.5, users are prompted to decide whether to opt-in or out of IDFA sharing before apps can query it. This choice can be altered in Settings. In May, 2021, Verizon-owned advertisement analytics company Flurry Analytics reported that 96% of US users opted out of IDFA sharing.

== History ==
=== Limit Ad Tracking ===
In iOS 10, Apple introduced "Limit Ad Tracking" setting for users who do not wish to be tracked by advertising networks. If the setting is enabled the system returns a default all-zero id for that device. As of December 2020, it's estimated that approximately 20% of users turn on this setting.

=== App Tracking Transparency ===
On September 3, 2020, Apple announced plans to restrict access to IDFA and require websites and apps to obtain an explicit permission from users before being granted access to IDFA. Since January 2021, users and developers could test this change by installing iOS 14 beta release.

In July 2020, Facebook stated that this transparency requirement would likely hurt their advertising targeting. Facebook said that these changes "may render [their tracking] so ineffective on iOS 14 that it may not make sense to offer it on iOS 14" and Facebook apps on iOS 14, including Facebook, WhatsApp, Instagram, Messenger, and others will not collect IDFA on iOS 14.

In early September, Apple postponed these restrictions until early 2021.

In December 2020, the Mozilla Foundation expressed support for Apple restricting access to IDFA and asked users to sign a petition to "help strengthen [Apple's] resolve to protect consumer privacy".

On December 15, 2020, Facebook launched a "Speak Up for Small Businesses" campaign against Apple. In this campaign, Facebook purchased full-page advertisements in newspapers and created a web page claiming Facebook tries to help small businesses. This campaign became controversial even within Facebook itself, because some employees thought Facebook was "trying to justify doing a bad thing by hiding behind people with a sympathetic message."

On January 27, 2021, Google announced that when the new requirement goes into effect, a "handful" of Google apps will stop collecting IDFAs (and thus the apps will avoid displaying a prompt for allowing tracking user activity).

In February 2021, Post-IDFA alliance surveyed 600 customers and noted that 38.5% of them said they plan to allow tracking by tapping "yes" in the App Tracking Transparency prompt.

On March 18, 2021, Facebook changed its stance. Facebook CEO, Mark Zuckerberg, claimed that these changes might even strengthen Facebook's position "if Apple’s changes encourage more businesses to conduct more commerce on [Facebook's] platforms by making it harder for them to use their data in order to find the customers that would want to use their products outside of [Facebook's] platforms".

On April 1, 2021, the Apple App Store started rejecting apps which used Adjust Apple's System Development Kit (SDK) and attempted to circumvent App Tracking Transparency rules via device fingerprinting (collecting device and usage data to create a unique identifier in order to track the user). On April 2, Adjust removed the offending code and app developers might pass App Store review after updating to the new Adjust SDK version.

In May, 2021, Verizon-owned advertisement analytics company Flurry reported that 96% of US users opted out of IDFA sharing. Approximately 3% of US users restricted IDFA sharing system-wide.

=== Unconditional restrictions on Advertising ID sharing ===
Apple unconditionally disables Apple IDFA sharing for some Apple ID accounts. In this case apps do not display permission prompt and the Settings entry "Allow Apps to Request to Track" is grayed out. Restrictions apply if the Apple ID is:

- classified as a child account (for example, user's calculated age is less than 18 years old), or
- managed by an educational institution or organization which limits tracking, or
- less than 3 days old.

== Circumvention attempts ==
In March 2021, the China Advertising Association announced that it was backing a device fingerprinting system as a work-around for Apple's new IDFA restrictions called CAID. Companies testing the system reportedly include ByteDance and Tencent.

== See also ==
- Advertising ID
- Ad-ID
