= MovieLabs =

Non-profit organization

Motion Picture Laboratories, Inc. (MovieLabs)
- Formation: 2006
- Type: Film and Television Technology, Research, Standards
- Headquarters: San Francisco, CA; United States
- Members: Walt Disney Studios; Sony Pictures; Paramount Pictures; Universal Studios; Warner Bros. Lionsgate Studios; Amazon MGM Studios
- Key people: Richard Berger, Jim Helman, Kip Welch, Raymond Drewry, Daniel Lucas
- Website: www.movielabs.com

MovieLabs is an independent non-profit organization founded by Disney, Fox, Paramount, Sony, Universal, and Warner Bros. to advance research and development in motion picture distribution and protection. It maintains project engineering, technology market analysis and standards development/evangelism among its core areas of focus and partners with leading universities, corporations, technology startups, service providers, and standards bodies to further explore innovative technologies in the field of digital media.

Key publications and standards available through MovieLabs include:
- Entertainment ID Registry (EIDR)
- Common Metadata
- Content Availability Metadata (Avails)
- Common Metadata Ratings
- Next Generation/HDR Video
- Enhanced Content Protection (ECP)
- Creative Works Ontology

== 2030 Vision ==
In August 2019, MovieLabs published a white paper, "The Evolution of Media Creation," in collaboration with technology teams from its member studios, outlining a set of goals for the future of media production by the year 2030.

Commonly referred to as the "2030 Vision," the paper sets out ten guiding principles centred on cloud-based infrastructure, zero-trust security, and software-defined workflows, with the stated aim of making production processes more efficient and flexible for creative teams.

To document industry implementation of the principles, MovieLabs established a 2030 Vision Showcase Program, through which participating companies publish case studies describing how they have applied the framework to their own workflows. Participants have included Adobe, Ateliere Creative Technologies, Avid, Gunpowder, Hammerspace, Light Iron, Pixel Logic, Sohonet, Universal Pictures, and Yamdu.

== AI Communication Framework (AICF) ==
In November 2026, MovieLabs published the AI Communication Framework (AICF), a standardized framework and common vocabulary for describing AI tools used in media creation workflows. The framework provides a structured method for documenting AI tool characteristics, provenance, operational behavior, and capabilities to support evaluation and approval processes by studios, production companies, and other stakeholders. To provide example uses of the framework from the beginning, MovieLabs collaborated with Bria and Yamdu.
