= Family Friendly Programming Forum =

The Family Friendly Programming Forum is a coalition of over 40 advertisers, all of whom belong to the Association of National Advertisers. They seek to increase the amount of "family-friendly" programming on U.S. television.

They define family-friendly programming as:

It is relevant to today's TV viewer, has generational appeal, depicts real life and is appropriate in theme, content and language for a broad family audience. Family friendly programs also embody a responsible resolution. Family friendly programs may include movies, dramas, situation comedies and informational programs.

The FFPF supports various programs and initiatives:

- Script Development Fund
- Student Scholarship Program
- Annual Symposium
- Family Television Awards

Projects that the script-development fund has helped reach the pilot stage include:

- Gilmore Girls
- Life Is Wild
- The 2007 reboot of Bionic Woman
- Chuck
- Ugly Betty
- Friday Night Lights
- Brothers & Sisters
- Everybody Hates Chris
- Notes from the Underbelly
- Runaway
- Commander in Chief
- The New Adventures of Old Christine
- Related
- Complete Savages
- Clubhouse
- 8 Simple Rules for Dating My Teenage Daughter
- American Dreams
- Big Time

The fund has no influence on the direction of the show further than the pilot.
