= Ad-ID =

Technical standard used to centrally manage advertising assets in the supply chain

- Native name: Ad-ID
- Base standards: ISCI
- Related standards: ARPP.TV
- Website: ad-id.org

Ad-ID is the advertising industry standard unique identifier for all commercial assets airing in the United States similar in concept to the UPC barcode used on retail products. Previously the industry used the ISCI system until 2003. Ad-ID is used to assure that the correct assets are delivered to the media by providing a central source for identification. It is mostly used for television and radio advertisements but has been gaining traction online and in print.

There is an equivalent code in France called ARPP.TV which also is the French industry standard unique identifier for all ads (and is based on ISCI).

Critical information about each ad and campaign is managed with Ad-ID. Details of the ad, what media the ad will be used in, clearance status, usage restrictions, related executions, and other vital information can be accessed by authorized users.

== Origin ==
Ad-ID was developed by the American Association of Advertising Agencies and the Association of National Advertisers, Inc., (ANA), Ad-ID uses the TV standard, ISCI commercial coding system in its monetization model. The ISCI code is an 8 character alphanumeric code (four alpha prefix followed by four numbers) in use since 1970. The prefixes were licensed and centrally managed and the complete ISCI codes were manually created and not stored in a central repository.

Ad-ID uses ISCI codes that are a basic 11 digits in length, (a set of four and set of eight alphanumeric characters) plus an optional 12th (to indicate HD or 3D). The first four alphanumeric characters are an identification prefix licensed to a particular company. Ad-ID generates ISCI codes through a secure, Web-accessible database.

== Technology ==
The Ad-ID system uses a web interface and a set of custom APIs to manage the system and integrate with customers' systems. The system uses a unique algorithm to maximize the use of the 12-character codes.

The Ad-ID system required the last 4 characters of a code to increment from the left to right, and to cycle through numbers and letters.

== See also ==
- Advertising ID, a unique user identifier tied to a mobile phone to track consumers habits and to pass data across apps for advertising purposes
- Apple's Identifier for Advertisers (IDFA)
