= Online advertising in China =

Online advertising in China reached 20.61 billion Chinese yuan in 2009, up 21.2% from 2008.

== Internet users ==
According to Internet World Stats, China's online shopping population reached 8% of the total Chinese population in 2009, and the number of Internet users in China reached 485 million in June 2011. They spend 1 billion hours online each day and the number will double to 2 billion by 2015. China's online shopping population is estimated to increase to 19% of the total population by 2012.

== Search engine advertising ==
The key players in China's search engine advertising are Tencent, Soso, Baidu, Sogou, Google, Bing, and Yahoo! China. Tencent became the top choice for search engine advertising in China. Tencent's advertising platform is in Chinese.

== See also ==
- China Advertising Association
