= The Wonderfully Weird World of Gumball =

Animated sitcom

- Release poster
- Also known as: TWWWOG
- Genre: Animated comedy; Slapstick; Satire; Black comedy; Surreal comedy
- Created by: Ben Bocquelet
- Based on: The Amazing World of Gumball by Ben Bocquelet
- Developed by: Matt Layzell; Erik Fountain
- Showrunners: Ben Bocquelet; Matt Layzell; Erik Fountain
- Directed by: Matt Layzell (Note: Uncredited); Erik Fountain; Luke Allen; James Lancett
- Voices of: Alkaio Thiele; Hero Hunter; Kinza Syed Khan; Teresa Gallagher; Dan Russell
- Theme music composer: Ben Locket
- Composer: Xav Clarke (Note: Original The Amazing World of Gumball themes by Ben Locket.)
- Countries of origin: United Kingdom; United States; Germany; France
- Original language: English
- No. of seasons: 2
- No. of episodes: 40

Production
- Executive producers: Ben Bocquelet; Matt Layzell; Erik Fountain; Sarah Fell; Sam Register
- Producers: Emma Fernando; Ryan Slater
- Editors: Andy Goodman; Steve Hughes
- Running time: 11 minutes
- Production companies: Hanna-Barbera Studios Europe; Studio Soi; Bobbypills

Original release
- Network: Hulu (United States)
- Release: July 28, 2025 – present
- Network: Cartoon Network/HBO Max (internationally)
- Release: October 6, 2025 – present

Related
- The Amazing World of Gumball

The Wonderfully Weird World of Gumball is an animated comedy television series created by Ben Bocquelet and produced by Hanna-Barbera Studios Europe. Serving as the seventh season of the Cartoon Network series The Amazing World of Gumball (2011–2019), the series premiered on Hulu in the United States on 28 July 2025, and internationally on Cartoon Network and HBO Max on 6 October. The second season was released in the United States on 22 December 2025, and premiered internationally on 2 February 2026. In December 2025, the series was renewed for a third and fourth season, ahead of the second season's premiere.

== Premise ==
Like its predecessor, the series focuses on the misadventures of Gumball Watterson, a mischievous blue 12-year-old cat, along with his 10-year-old adopted brother, Darwin, a goldfish. Together, they cause mischief among their family, as well as with the wide array of students at Elmore Junior High, where they attend middle school.

== Voice cast and characters ==
=== Main ===
- Alkaio Thiele as Gumball Watterson, a cynical yet good-natured blue anthropomorphic cat.
- Hero Hunter as Darwin Watterson, a silly goldfish with legs who is Gumball's best friend and adoptive brother.
- Kinza Syed Khan as Anais Watterson, an intellectual pink rabbit and the younger sister of Gumball and Darwin.
- Teresa Gallagher as Nicole Watterson, a temperamental workaholic blue cat and the mother of the Watterson family.
- Dan Russell as Richard Watterson, a lazy and immature pink rabbit and the father of the Watterson family.

=== Additional voices ===
- Max Cazier
- Maria Teresa Creasey
- Sandra Searles Dickinson
- Stefan Ashton Frank
- Rich Fulcher
- Steve Furst
- Hugo Harold-Harrison
- Alex Jordan
- Simon Lipkin
- Adam Long
- Jessica McDonald
- Naomi McDonald
- Naoko Mori
- Giles New
- Alexis Platt
- Alix Wilton Regan
- Liza Ross
- Clive Russell
- Kerry Shale

== Production ==
During a press interview with WarnerMedia on 21 September 2021, a seventh season and film adaptation of The Amazing World of Gumball was announced to have been greenlit. The film adaptation was originally intended to serve as a conclusion to the original program and "a new beginning in establishing the world for the accompanying series". At the 2023 Annecy International Animation Film Festival, the seventh season was officially confirmed to be in production, initially without a confirmed release date. An EIDR listing subsequently revealed that the season would consist of 40 episodes. At the following year's festival, Warner Bros. Animation showcased the project during their slate presentation, confirming it had entered full production and previewing the premiere episode, "The Burger".

On 19 May 2025, it was announced that the series would officially be retitled The Wonderfully Weird World of Gumball, scheduled for release on Hulu in the United States and on Cartoon Network and HBO Max internationally. Bocquelet later explained that the name change was a deliberate choice to distinguish the Hulu-bound revival from the original Cartoon Network run, serving as a fresh jumping-on point for new audiences while reflecting the slightly more mature, surreal direction of the updated series. The series was positioned as the seventh season of The Amazing World of Gumball.

All three Watterson children were recast: Alkaio Thiele, Hero Hunter, and Kinza Syed Khan were cast as the new voices of Gumball, Darwin, and Anais respectively, marking the first time Kyla Rae Kowalewski did not voice Anais. Teresa Gallagher and Dan Russell returned as Nicole and Richard Watterson. In exclusive interviews, the new cast members teased the revival's "unique spin" on the Watterson family, noting that the characters would face new, complex dynamics—such as Darwin moving into his own bedroom—while retaining the show's signature meta-humor.

German-based Studio Soi and French-based Bobbypills provide animation and storyboard services, respectively; the former had worked on the original series. Executive producers Matt Layzell and Erik Fountain had previously worked on the Netflix interactive series Battle Kitty, serving as series creator and supervising director, respectively.

A release date of 28 July 2025 was confirmed in June 2025. Following the series premiere on Hulu, Bocquelet confirmed that the series would eventually resolve the cliffhanger ending of the season 6 finale, "The Inquisition", in an episode titled "The Rewrite". The show began its international rollout on Cartoon Network and HBO Max on 6 October 2025.

On 17 October 2025, audio post-production studio Fuse Post confirmed that production on the first season had concluded. On 19 November 2025, another set of episodes comprising the second half of the first season (Note: Referred to by Cartoon Network as the second season) were announced for release on 22 December 2025 on Hulu, followed by international releases in February 2026. In December 2025, an additional 40 episodes comprising a third and fourth season were ordered.

== Episodes ==
Luke Allen and James Lancett serve as the directors of the revival, credited as such for all episodes, though it is unknown if they directed episodes separately.

Season	Episodes	Originally released
1	20	July 28, 2025
2	20	December 22, 2025

=== Season 1 (2025) ===
No. overall	No. in season	Title	Written by	Storyboarded by	Hulu release date	U.K. air date	Prod. code
241	1	"The Burger"	Bryan Caselli, Jessica Combs, Matt Layzell, Todd Michael McClintock & Ben Bocquelet	Oliver Hamilton	July 28, 2025	6 October 2025	GB701
Cold open: Seven years after the events of the original series, Gumball and Darwin wake up and sneeze off all the dust in Elmore, before going back to sleep for five more minutes. Main plot: After Miss Simian scares her class with a lesson on the dangers of eating fast food, Gumball and Darwin find it impossible to eat healthy due to high prices and ubiquitous marketing in their society due to the literal fast food monopolist, Mr. Bilderburger, who owns every food chain in Elmore.
242	2	"The Assistant"	Bryan Caselli, Michele Cavin, Jessica Combs, Matt Layzell, Joe Markham, Todd Michael McClintock & Joe Parham	Aurelie Charbonnier	July 28, 2025	6 October 2025	GB702
Sick of her lazy family, Nicole makes friends with Elmore Shippit's (the show's equivalent of Amazon.com) A.I. assistant, Ori, who helps her with the errands, listens to her stories, and tries to suck Nicole into her virtual world and kill off her family with a self-driving car.
243	3	"The Distance"	Bryan Caselli, Jessica Combs, Matt Layzell, Joe Markham, Todd Michael McClintock, Joe Parham & Ben Bocquelet	Melanie Lopez	July 28, 2025	6 October 2025	GB703
Worried that Gumball and Darwin are getting too attached, Nicole gives Darwin his own room to separate the boys. Gumball tries to win back Darwin's attention when he moves on to new friends.
244	4	"The Thing"	Bryan Caselli, Michele Cavin, Jessica Combs, Matt Layzell, Joe Markham, Todd Michael McClintock & Joe Parham	Oliver Hamilton	July 28, 2025	6 October 2025	GB705
When Granny Jojo is coming over for dinner, Nicole reminds Richard of "the thing". Obviously forgetting, Richard enlists the kids' help to retrace his memories.
245	5	"The Butts"	Bryan Caselli, Jessica Combs, Matt Layzell, Joe Markham, Todd Michael McClintock, Joe Parham & Ben Bocquelet	Jeremy Abram Paoletti	July 28, 2025	7 October 2025	GB704
When Principal Brown feels ashamed of his butt, Gumball helps him regain body confidence in order to read his butt poem at a recital.
246	6	"The Traffic"	Bryan Caselli, Jessica Combs, Matt Layzell, Todd Michael McClintock & Ben Bocquelet	Aurelie Charbonnier	July 28, 2025	8 October 2025	GB711
To make up for ignoring her due to Nicole tending to her family's antics, the Wattersons take Anais to Daisyland after news hits that the park will be closing, but have to put up with traffic issues.
247	7	"The Astrological"	Bryan Caselli, Michele Cavin, Jessica Combs, Matt Layzell, Joe Markham, Todd Michael McClintock & Joe Parham	Bianca Ansems	July 28, 2025	9 October 2025	GB707
Mr. Small has been promoted to science teacher due to school budget cuts, and teaches the class on how the stars can predict the future and play matchmaker. Gumball and Penny think it's ridiculous, but when everyone in school falls for their predicted pairs, Gumball worries that he and Penny aren't meant to be together.
248	8	"The Cheerleader"	Bryan Caselli, Jessica Combs, Matt Layzell, Todd Michael McClintock & Ben Bocquelet	Aurelie Charbonnier	July 28, 2025	10 October 2025	GB706
The Wattersons help Richard get on the school's cheerleading team and finally beat the generational trauma of having his dreams crushed by family members who don't believe in him.
249	9	"The Boring"	Bryan Caselli, Michele Cavin, Jessica Combs, Matt Layzell & Todd Michael McClintock	Jeremy Abram Paoletti	July 28, 2025	13 October 2025	GB709
Gumball and Darwin discover that Molly's stories are so boring and long-winded that they can slow down and stop time, which they use to stall their fight against Tina.
250	10	"The Teacher"	Bryan Caselli, Jessica Combs, Kate Davies, Matt Layzell, Todd Michael McClintock, Tobi Wilson & Ben Bocquelet	Aurelie Charbonnier	July 28, 2025	14 October 2025	GB717
When Gumball's phone is confiscated, he follows Miss Simian and discovers that she is involved in a string of shady deals in order to get school supplies due to lack of educational funding.
251	11	"The App"	Bryan Caselli, Michele Cavin, Jessica Combs, Matt Layzell, Joe Markham, Todd Michael McClintock & Joe Parham	Bianca Ansems	July 28, 2025	15 October 2025	GB712
When a new video-sharing platform called Clik-Sap (a spoof of TikTok) turns the kids of Elmore into mindless zombies due to their irresistible trends, Gumball and Darwin must fight its power.
252	12	"The Entrance"	Bryan Caselli, Jessica Combs, Matt Layzell, Todd Michael McClintock & Ben Bocquelet	Aurelie Charbonnier	July 28, 2025	16 October 2025	GB723
Gumball and Darwin get invited to Tobias' Tropi-Gal mansion party, despite that they think it's a flimsy excuse for him to hit on their respective girlfriends, so they plan to make a grand entrance. When they find out that no one is going, the boys help out by sending their classmates some contraband cologne that causes vivid hallucinations and destructive behavior.
253	13	"The Letter"	Bryan Caselli, Jessica Combs, Matt Layzell, Todd Michael McClintock & Ben Bocquelet	Melanie Lopez	July 28, 2025	20 October 2025	GB708
When Darwin sends Carrie a love letter before learning that she hates romantic gestures, he, with Gumball's help, tries to retrieve it before she sees it.
254	14	"The Gut"	Bryan Caselli, Michele Cavin, Jessica Combs, Matt Layzell, Joe Markham, Todd Michael McClintock, Joe Parham, Jessica Silcock, Naomi Smith & Tobi Wilson	Jawed Boudaoud	July 28, 2025	21 October 2025	GB715
When Richard eats Anais' science project, his gut turns into a sentient being who's smarter and more fatherly than Richard ever was. The gut slowly begins to consume Richard's whole body and attacks the kids.
255	15	"The Wrinkle"	Bryan Caselli, Todd Michael McClintock, Tobi Wilson & Ben Bocquelet	Jawed Boudaoud	July 28, 2025	22 October 2025	GB724
When Anais begins growing wrinkles due to stressing over her family's stupidity, she comes up with a way to fix everyone's problems.
256	16	"The Gourmet"	Bryan Caselli, Michele Cavin, Jessica Combs, Todd Michael McClintock, James McNicholas & Tobi Wilson	Bianca Ansems	July 28, 2025	23 October 2025	GB716
After tasting Masami's gourmet double truffle mac and cheese at lunch, Gumball decides to become a member of the Yoshida family in order to have his own gourmet meals.
257	17	"The Pool"	Bryan Caselli, Jessica Combs, Matt Layzell, Todd Michael McClintock, James McNicholas & Ben Bocquelet	Aurelie Charbonnier	July 28, 2025	27 October 2025	GB727
When Gumball, Darwin and Richard discover Mr. Robinson has a luxury in-ground swimming pool, they try to tunnel their way into it underground. However, after accidentally draining all the water, they must refill the pool before Mr. Robinson finds out.
258	18	"The Portrait"	Bryan Caselli, Michele Cavin, Stephen M. Collins, Jessica Combs, Matt Layzell, Todd Michael McClintock & Joe Parham	Melanie Lopez	July 28, 2025	28 October 2025	GB710
Nicole wants a new family photo, but her parents, Mary and Daniel, visit with news that Mary is now divorced and dating her yoga instructor, Johnny Toucan, while Richard's con artist father, Frankie, visits and reveals he's dating his parole officer (an anthropomorphic ruler).
259	19	"The Climb"	Bryan Caselli, Michele Cavin, Jessica Combs, Matt Layzell, Todd Michael McClintock & Tobi Wilson	Julien Thompson	July 28, 2025	29 October 2025	GB718
Haunted by an incident in which his pants fell off on the rock climbing wall in front of the whole school during gym class, Gumball must find a way to conquer his fear of climbing.
260	20	"The Amadain"	Bryan Caselli, Michele Cavin, Jessica Combs, Matt Layzell, Todd Michael McClintock & Ben Bocquelet	Bianca Ansems	July 28, 2025	30 October 2025	GB730
Gumball is tricked into attending Penny's grandmother's birthday party, and is forced to endure in her family's weird traditions.

=== Season 2 (2025) ===
No. overall	No. in season	Title	Written by	Storyboarded by	Hulu release date	U.K. air date	Prod. code
261	1	"The Summoning"	Bryan Caselli, Michele Cavin, Jessica Combs, Matt Layzell, Todd Michael McClintock & Tobi Wilson	Julien Thompson	December 22, 2025	16 October 2026	GB725
262	2	"The Unfollow"	Bryan Caselli, Jessica Combs, Kate Davies, Matt Layzell, Todd Michael McClintock & Ben Bocquelet	Jawed Boudaoud	December 22, 2025	2 February 2026	GB731
263	3	"The Promposal"	Bryan Caselli, Jessica Combs, Matt Layzell, Todd Michael McClintock, Jessica Silcock, Naomi Smith, Tobi Wilson & Ben Bocquelet	Jawed Boudaoud	December 22, 2025	3 February 2026	GB720
264	4	"The Trumpet"	George Gendi, Matt Layzell & Michele Cavin	Melanie Lopez	December 22, 2025	4 February 2026	GB714
265	5	"The Synthesis"	Shane McCarthy & Ben Bocquelet	Matt Layzell	December 22, 2025	5 February 2026	GB739
266	6	"The Cheapmas"	Bryan Caselli, Ruby Clyde, Jessica Combs, Kate Davies, Matt Layzell, Todd Michael McClintock, Rachel WD & Ben Bocquelet	Melanie Lopez	December 22, 2025	TBA	GB733
267	7	"The Score"	Bryan Caselli, Ruby Clyde, Jessica Combs, Kate Davies, Matt Layzell, Todd Michael McClintock, Rachel WD & Ben Bocquelet	Jawed Boudaoud	December 22, 2025	6 February 2026	GB728
268	8	"The Diary"	Bryan Caselli, Michele Cavin, Jessica Combs, Matt Layzell & Todd Michael McClintock	Bianca Ansems	December 22, 2025	9 February 2026	GB726
269	9	"The Punishment"	Ruby Clyde, Jessica Combs, Matt Layzell, Rachel WD, Tobi Wilson & Ben Bocquelet	Aurelie Charbonnier	December 22, 2025	10 February 2026	GB732
270	10	"The Roast"	Bryan Caselli, Ruby Clyde, Jessica Combs, Kate Davies, Matt Layzell, Todd Michael McClintock, Rachel WD, Tobi Wilson & Ben Bocquelet	Julien Thompson	December 22, 2025	11 February 2026	GB729
271	11	"The Survivalists"	George Gendi, Tobi Wilson & Ben Bocquelet	Melanie Lopez	December 22, 2025	TBA	GB719
272	12	"The Labels"	Bryan Caselli, Ruby Clyde, Jessica Combs, Matt Layzell, Todd Michael McClintock, Rachel WD, Tobi Wilson & Ben Bocquelet	Julien Thompson	December 22, 2025	TBA	GB734
273	13	"The Fools"	Bryan Caselli, Michele Cavin, Ruby Clyde, Jessica Combs, Kate Davies, Matt Layzell, Todd Michael McClintock & Rachel WD	Jawed Boudaoud	December 22, 2025	TBA	GB736
274	14	"The Homework"	Bryan Caselli, Jessica Combs, Matt Layzell, Todd Michael McClintock & Ben Bocquelet	Julien Thompson	December 22, 2025	TBA	GB722
275	15	"The Sonder"	Bryan Caselli, Michele Cavin, Ruby Clyde, Jessica Combs, Kate Davies, Matt Layzell, Todd Michael McClintock & Rachel WD	Matt Layzell	December 22, 2025	TBA	GB740
276	16	"The Mister"	Bryan Caselli, Michele Cavin, Ruby Clyde, Jessica Combs, Matt Layzell, Todd Michael McClintock, Rachel WD & Tobi Wilson	Bianca Ansems	December 22, 2025	TBA	GB738
277	17	"The Tracking"	Ruby Clyde, Rachel WD & Ben Bocquelet	Matt Layzell	December 22, 2025	TBA	GB741
278	18	"The Pants"	Michele Cavin, Ruby Clyde, Jessica Combs, Kate Davies & Rachel WD	Melanie Lopez	December 22, 2025	TBA	GB737
279	19	"The Necroprancer"	Bryan Caselli, Jessica Combs, Matt Layzell, Shane McCarthy, Todd Michael McClintock, Tobi Wilson & Ben Bocquelet	Bianca Ansems	December 22, 2025	TBA	GB735
280	20	"The Rewrite"	Ruby Clyde, Rachel WD & Ben Bocquelet	Oliver Hamilton	December 22, 2025	2 February 2026	GB742

== Reception ==
=== Ratings ===
According to Nielsen rankings, The Wonderfully Weird World of Gumball debuted with 363 million minutes watched in its first week, and was ranked 10th in most streamed originals.

=== Critical reception ===
On the review aggregator website Rotten Tomatoes, 100% of 5 critics' reviews are positive. Fernanda Camargo of Common Sense Media rated the series a three-out-of-five stars, stating the series has "more social and political commentary, with implied meanings that might be tricky for younger kids to grasp." David Kaldor of Bubbleblabber.com gave the series a 7 out of 10, noting that "there's no time skip or aging up of the characters" and that "everyone's pretty much exactly where they left off at the end of the last show."

=== Accolades ===
Award	Date of ceremony	Category	Recipient(s)	Result	Ref.
Annie Awards	21 February 2026	Best TV/Media – Children	"The Rewrite"	Won	
Annie Awards	21 February 2026	Best Voice Acting – TV/Media	Alkaio Thiele (for "The Amadain")	Nominated	
Rockie Awards	15 June 2026	Children Animation	The Wonderfully Weird World of Gumball	Nominated	
British Academy Television Awards	10 May 2026	Children's: Scripted	The Wonderfully Weird World of Gumball	Nominated	
British Academy Television Awards	10 May 2026	Children’s Craft Team	The Wonderfully Weird World of Gumball	Nominated	
Kidscreen Awards	11 January 2027	Kids (6 to 10)- Best New Series	The Wonderfully Weird World of Gumball	Pending	
Kidscreen Awards	11 January 2027	Kids (6 to 10)- Best Animated Series	The Wonderfully Weird World of Gumball	Pending	
