= Advertising ID =

Unique identifier tied to a device for advertising

An advertising ID is a unique user identifier (ID) assigned to a mobile device (smart phone, tablet computer), or operating environment, to help advertising services personalize their offers. It can be sent to advertisers and other third parties which can use this unique ID to track the user's movements, habits, and usages of applications. There is a potential for such technology to replace magic cookies.

== Implementations ==
- Apple calls their advertising ID the "Identifier for Advertisers" (IDFA). Beginning with its iOS 14.5 software update, Apple will allow its users to choose whether to allow apps to track their IDFA.
- Google calls their implementation "Google Advertising ID" (GAID) and formerly "Android ID", "Android Device ID", or "Android Advertising ID" (AAID).
- Microsoft uses a similar technology, also called Advertising ID, that is generated for each device and user. In Windows 10 & 11, it can be turned off in the settings panel.

== See also ==
- Ad-ID – Technical standard used to centrally manage advertising assets in the supply chain
