= Ben Bocquelet =

French and British animator (born 1980)

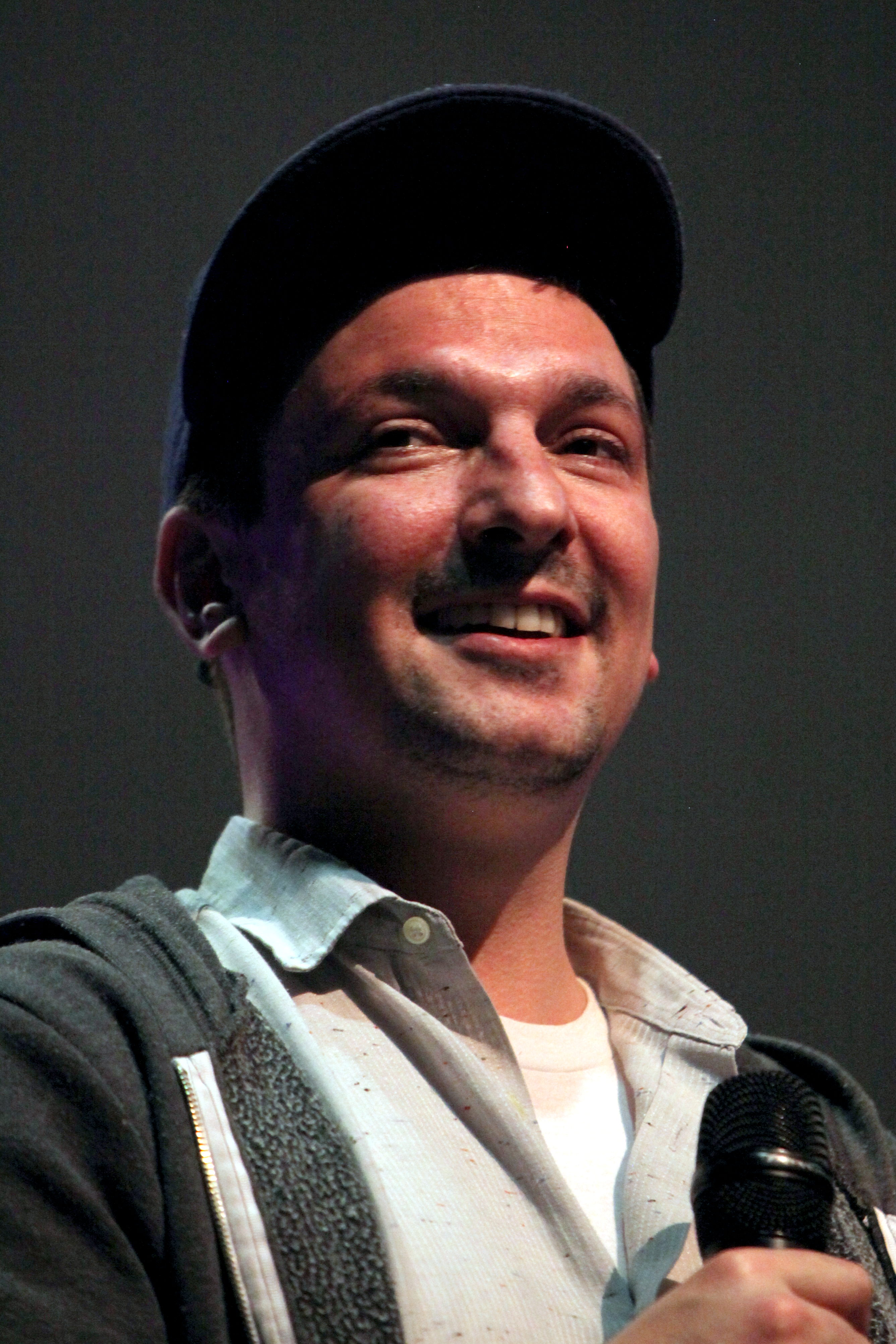
- Bocquelet at Polymanga 2016
- Born: Benjamin Bocquelet; 27 June 1980 (age 46); Paris, France
- Citizenship: France; United Kingdom
- Occupations: Animator; writer; director; producer
- Years active: 2003–present
- Known for: The Amazing World of Gumball; The Wonderfully Weird World of Gumball

Benjamin Bocquelet (born 27 June 1980) is a French and British animator, writer, director, and producer. He is best known as the creator and executive producer of the Cartoon Network animated series The Amazing World of Gumball and its spin-off and revival series The Wonderfully Weird World of Gumball. He was also the director of the 2003 short film The Hell's Kitchen.

== Career ==
When Cartoon Network Development Studio Europe was created in 2007, Bocquelet was hired in order to help people pitch their projects to Cartoon Network after the dismissal of Nickelodeon and Jetix subdivisions of Europe. However, when the studio decided to have its employees all pitch their own ideas, he decided to take some of the rejected characters he had created for commercials and put them all in one series, with a school setting. Daniel Lennard, Khaki Jones, and Brian A. Miller, the Vice President of Original Series and Development at Turner Broadcasting System, liked the idea and the series was ultimately greenlit.

=== Influences ===
Bocquelet has cited Hayao Miyazaki, Akira Toriyama, Bill Watterson, Matt Groening, Steven Spielberg, and the 1988 film Who Framed Roger Rabbit as major influences on his work.

=== The Amazing World of Gumball ===
After leaving Studio AKA, the creative director at the studio encouraged Bocquelet to join the new Cartoon Network studio in London, Cartoon Network Development Studio Europe. He received a job there helping other people pitch their ideas to Cartoon Network, and came up with his own idea while doing so. He pitched his idea to the producers. His idea was a show called Gumball about reject cartoon characters attending a remedial school, but producers felt this concept was too sad. He then revised this idea and made it more cheery, taking on the structure of a family sitcom. The producers liked this idea, and work went underway for what would become The Amazing World of Gumball, which premiered on Cartoon Network on 3 May 2011. He named some characters after his relatives (Nicole, Richard, and Anais were named after his mother, father, and sister, respectively). In October 2011, Bocquelet revealed in a Twitter post that the Wattersons themselves were named after Bill Watterson, the creator of the comic strip Calvin and Hobbes.

On 6 September 2016 Bocquelet said that he was departing from the show after the completion of Season 6, but production would continue. However, on 7 October 2018, he retweeted that the show would end after the sixth season, though the author of the article made a follow-up article saying that more seasons are still possible. Following the series finale of The Amazing World of Gumball, and the mixed reviews it received from fans, Bocquelet said that he would create a film to resolve its cliffhanger. The film was officially announced on 17 February 2021, under the working title The Amazing World of Gumball Movie. On 21 September 2021, HBO Max and Cartoon Network announced the film had been greenlit and was now titled The Amazing World of Gumball: The Movie!. The film's planned release on HBO Max was cancelled in August 2022, as HBO went under new management, but the movie is still in production by 2024.

A Gumball spin-off series, which was later confirmed as a continuation, was announced at the Annecy International Animation Film Festival in 2023, marking Bocquelet's return to the Gumball franchise. It was released on 28 July 2025, on Hulu. Four seasons have been ordered, with two having already released.

== Filmography ==
=== Film ===
Year	Title	Notes
2003	The Hell's Kitchen (short film)	Co-writer; Co-director
2006	The Little Short-Sighted Snake (short film)	Designer

=== Television ===
Year	Title	Notes
2011–2019	The Amazing World of Gumball	Creator; Executive producer Showrunner; Writer; Art director
2025–present	The Wonderfully Weird World of Gumball	Creator; Executive producer Showrunner; Writer
