= CAID (technology) =

Tracking technology developed by the China Advertising Association

CAID is a surveillance technology developed by the China Advertising Association to circumvent web tracking restrictions set by Apple. CAID was developed by the state-supported, 2,000-member association to identify users when Apple's Identifier for Advertisers ("IDFA") is unavailable.

Besides a free demo, the technology was unimplemented as of March 2021 and Apple was aware but had yet to address the effort. Public release was unannounced but anticipated later in the month.

CAID is believed to be an open framework based on device fingerprinting that uses a common API-based service, initially operated by the China Advertising Association. to coordinate activities by multiple actors. Data that can be used to create the fingerprint includes model, IP address, language and device start-up time.

Companies testing the system reportedly include ByteDance and Tencent. Procter & Gamble is also reported to have played a part in the development of the technology.
