= Industry Standard Coding Identification =

Standard to identify ads for agencies and advertisers

Industry Standard Coding Identification (ISCI; /ˈɪzki/ IZ-kee), also known as Industry Standard Commercial Identification) was a standard created to identify commercials that aired on TV in the United States, for ad agencies and advertisers from 1970.

== History ==
ISCI was invented in 1970 by David Webster Dole with the backing of the American Association of Advertising Agencies (4As), the Association of National Advertisers (ANA), the National Association of Broadcasters (NAB), the SRA and the Television Bureau of Advertising (TVB). It was maintained and operated by Dole until 1992, when the 4As and the ANA bought ISCI from Dole. In 2003, ISCI was replaced by Ad-ID as the official industry standard. Whilst ISCI has a replacement in Ad-ID it still has uses in legacy applications.

== Coding ==
An ISCI code was a set of 8 characters, the first four being alphabetic, and the remaining four being numeric, in the format 'ABCD1234' . The alphabetical characters usually represented the advertiser (some examples are QWAN for Wells Fargo Bank, KOCL for Coca-Cola, and PEMX for Pepsi), and the numeric characters were determined by the individual creating the code, with different numbers used for either different spots, or different versions of the same spot.

For example, a :30 second spot might have had a code of XECA1263, while the same commercial in a shortened :20 or :15 version (or in a different language such as Spanish) might have had a slightly different code of XECA1264. The ISCI code was unique to each individual commercial. The slightest change to an ad led to the use of another code.

== Usage ==
ISCIs were printed on tape labels, in the production slate preceding the commercial on the tape or on digitally transmitted files through media distributors like Extreme Reach, Comcast Ad Distribution, Javelin and Yangaroo.
