= Association of National Advertisers =

Industry association

- Founded: Detroit, U.S. June 24, 1910; 116 years ago
- Headquarters: New York City, U.S., United States
- Key people: Bob Liodice (CEO); Christine Manna (President & COO)
- Website: ana.net

The Association of National Advertisers (ANA) represents the marketing community in the United States. Its headquarters is in New York City and it has another office in Washington, D.C. ANA's membership include over 1,600 companies with 40,000 brands that collectively spend over 400 billion dollars in marketing communications and advertising.

== History ==
=== Early years ===
The Association of National Advertisers, Inc., the U.S. advertising industry's oldest trade association, was founded on June 24, 1910, in Detroit, Michigan, by 45 companies. Founding members include the Burroughs Adding Machine Company, Glidden Varnish Company, Macey Company, Sherwin-Williams, and National Lead Company. Originally known as the Association of National Advertising Managers, in 1914 the association officially adopted the name it now bears.

At the time of its formation, ANA's objective was to promote cooperative relationships between regional and national advertising industries, manufacturers and dealers, and advertisers and agencies. Other issues that the advertisers sought to address concerned accurate audience measurement and the establishment of national standards for measuring advertising results.

The Audit Bureau of Circulations was formed in 1914 to verify publication circulation figures and track media rates. Twenty years later the Traffic Audit Bureau was created to effectively measure outdoor media. In 1936 the Advertising Research Foundation – a spin-off of an ANA committee – came into being with the aim of increasing the effectiveness of marketing and advertising communications through advertising, marketing and media research. The War Advertising Council was formed in 1942 to bolster the sale of war bonds, later becoming The Advertising Council as it took on other public service issues.

=== 1950–1999 ===
In 1963 the ANA helped establish the Joint Policy Committee (JPC) for Broadcast Talent Union Relations, which negotiates contracts with the Screen Actors Guild-American Federation of Television and Radio Artists (SAG-AFTRA), and the American Federation of Musicians.

The efficacy of advertising can only be maintained by responsible advertising, and for the purpose of industry self-regulation concerning matters of truth, taste, and social responsibility, the ANA, working in conjunction with the AAAA, American Advertising Federation (AAF), and BBB National Programs launched the National Advertising Review Board (NARB) in 1971. The NARB acts as the appeals board for the National Advertising Division (NAD) of BBB National Programs. The NAD investigates matters of honesty and accuracy in advertising and issues of taste or social responsibility are addressed by the NARB. In 1986 the ANA, AAAA and AAF formed the State Advertising Coalition to monitor state legislative and regulatory issues that threaten advertising. Later, in 1988, ANA worked in concert with other industry trade associations to form the Advertising Tax Coalition to combat federal advertising tax proposals.

The ANA has fielded numerous studies and helped develop advertising measurement systems from its inception to the present: from the Crossley rating system, developed in 1930, which established national standards by which radio audiences could be measured, to the recently introduced Ad-ID, a system that assigns a unique and permanent code to each ad with 360-degree application.

The Family Friendly Programming Forum, whose goal is to increase prime time television programming that can be viewed by the entire family, is a member initiative begun with the support of the ANA in 1998. In addition to providing a script development fund and scholarships for students working on family friendly programming, the televised Family Television Awards are held to recognize outstanding family programming.

=== 2000-present ===
Developed by ANA and the American Association of Advertising Agencies, Ad-ID is a web-based system accessible 24/7 worldwide that generates a unique identifying code for each advertising asset, creating a capability to identify them across all media. Using Ad-ID, and promoting the use of its web services, greatly improves workflow between agency, advertiser, distributor and medium. Ad-ID upgrades the previous ISCI commercial coding system and replaces other methods used to identify advertising assets. Ad-ID is the industry standard identifier for all related forms of media.

In 2014, ANA acquired the Brand Activation Association, formerly known as the Promotion Marketing Association, and the Business Marketing Association.

== Subsidiaries ==
The ANA has a number of subsidiaries:

- ANA Trade Association
- ANA Educational Foundation
- SAG/AFTRA Fund
- Alliance for Family Entertainment
- Alliance for Inclusive & Multicultural Marketing

== CRIDO ==
Together with many major associations and companies, the ANA founded the Coalition for Responsible Internet Domain Oversight (CRIDO), which opposes the rollout of ICANN's top-level domain expansion program. CRIDO fights ICANN's proposed program, citing its "deeply flawed justification, excessive cost and harm to brand owners, likelihood of predatory cyber harm to consumers and failure to act in the public interest".
