= The Amazing World of Gumball =

Animated sitcom

- Also known as: Gumball; TAWOG
- Genre: Animated sitcom; Satire; Slapstick; Surreal comedy; Black comedy
- Created by: Ben Bocquelet
- Showrunner: Ben Bocquelet
- Directed by: Mic Graves; Antoine Perez (S5–6)
- Voices of: Logan Grove; Kwesi Boakye; Kyla Rae Kowalewski; Teresa Gallagher; Dan Russell; Jacob Hopkins; Terrell Ransom Jr.; Nicolas Cantu; Donielle T. Hansley Jr.; Christian J. Simon; Duke Cutler
- Theme music composer: Ben Locket
- Composers: Ben Locket; Neil Myers (S6); Xav Clarke (S6)
- Countries of origin: United Kingdom; United States; Germany; Ireland (S1)
- Original language: English
- No. of seasons: 6
- No. of episodes: 240 (list of episodes)

Production
- Executive producers: Ben Bocquelet; Daniel Lennard (S1–3); Michael Carrington (S1–2); Sarah Fell (S4–6); Patricia Hidalgo (S4–6); Mic Graves (S6)
- Producers: Joanna Beresford (S1); Ellen Collins (S4); Sarah Fell (S2–6)
- Editors: Richard Overall; Tony Hull (S2–6); Lucy Benson (S4–5)
- Running time: 11 minutes (Note: Combined as 2 segments of 22 minutes for seasons 1–3 as originally produced.)
- Production companies: Cartoon Network Development Studio Europe; Studio Soi; Boulder Media (S1); Dandelion Studios (S1)

Original release
- Network: Cartoon Network
- Release: 3 May 2011 – 24 June 2019

Related
- The Wonderfully Weird World of Gumball

The Amazing World of Gumball (also known simply as Gumball or by its abbreviation TAWOG) is an animated sitcom created by Ben Bocquelet for Cartoon Network. The series follows the lives of 12-year-old Gumball Watterson, an anthropomorphic blue cat, and his adoptive goldfish brother Darwin, who attend middle school in the fictional city of Elmore. They often find themselves in various shenanigans around the city, during which they interact with fellow family members—younger sister Anais, mother Nicole, and father Richard—along with an extended supporting cast of characters.

Bocquelet based several of the series' characters on rejected characters from his previous commercial work while making its premise a mixture of "family shows and school shows", which Cartoon Network was heavily interested in. After Bocquelet pitched The Amazing World of Gumball to the network, Turner Broadcasting executive Daniel Lennard green-lit the production of the series. The show is produced by Cartoon Network Development Studio Europe (later Hanna-Barbera Studios Europe), in association with Boulder Media (Ireland; season 1), Dandelion Studios (season 1), and Studio Soi (Germany).

Gumball is noted for its intentional stylistic disunity, with characters designed, filmed, and animated using various styles and techniques, often within the same scene (stylised traditional animation, puppetry, CGI, stop motion, Flash animation, live-action, etc.). Although it is a children's series, Gumball comments on topics that are often considered serious or mature, including philosophy, marriage, cyberbullying, political intolerance, mental illness, and the human condition. The series has received critical acclaim and developed a cult following, with particular praise for its extensive references to popular culture and internet culture, sarcasm, subtle innuendos, dark humour, and metahumour.

On 6 September 2016, Bocquelet announced the series would end after season 6; he reaffirmed his position on Twitter in October 2018. However, Turner Northern Europe was unable to confirm at the time whether the sixth season would be the show's last. Following the season 6 finale, two miniseries were released: the six-episode Darwin's Yearbook in November 2019 and The Gumball Chronicles in October 2020.

On 17 February 2021, Cartoon Network revealed that a television film based on the series was in development. Later that year, a spin-off series was announced to follow both the original show and the film. Following several production shifts and network changes, the spin-off was rebranded as a revival series titled The Wonderfully Weird World of Gumball, which premiered on 28 July 2025.

== Premise ==
The series revolves around the life of a 12-year-old cat named Gumball Watterson and his frequent shenanigans in the fictional American city of Elmore, California, accompanied by his adopted goldfish brother and best friend Darwin. Gumball's other family members—his intellectual sister Anais and stay-at-home father Richard, both rabbits, and workaholic mother Nicole, a cat—often find themselves involved in Gumball's exploits. Gumball attends school with his siblings at Elmore Junior High, where throughout the series he interacts with his various middle school classmates, most prominently his love interest Penny Fitzgerald.

Although it is a children's series, Gumball comments on topics that are often considered serious or mature, including philosophy, marriage, cyberbullying, political intolerance, mental illness, and the human condition.

One prominent feature of the series since its third season is "The Void", a dimension inside Elmore where all of the universe's mistakes reside. This includes references to aspects of reality as well as in-series elements. An episode from the revival series, "The Rewrite", establishes that the Void will end the show's universe when the series is cancelled, or if the main characters discover they are fictional. Rob is a background character from the first two seasons who became trapped in the Void after becoming "irrelevant". He later escapes in season 3, after which he becomes Gumball's nemesis and main antagonist.

== Episodes ==
Season	Episodes	Originally released	
Season	Episodes	First released	Last released
Pilot		May 9, 2008	
1	36	May 3, 2011	March 13, 2012
2	40	August 7, 2012	December 3, 2013
3	40	June 5, 2014	August 6, 2015
4	40	July 7, 2015	October 27, 2016
5	40	September 1, 2016	November 10, 2017
6	44	January 5, 2018	June 24, 2019
Darwin's Yearbook	6	December 14, 2019	December 28, 2019
The Gumball Chronicles	8	October 5, 2020	June 20, 2021

"The Copycats" featured the characters interacting with ones similar to those from Miracle Star, a Chinese clone of the show.

=== Shorts and miniseries ===
==== Waiting for Gumball ====
At the 2017 Annecy International Animated Film Festival, Cartoon Network greenlit a special mixed-media puppet episode titled "The Puppets", produced in collaboration with puppet production studio Blink Industries. The episode inspired Waiting for Gumball, a series of thirteen puppet-animated web shorts featuring Gumball and Darwin.

==== Darwin's Yearbook ====
A six-episode miniseries titled Darwin's Yearbook aired on Cartoon Network from 14 to 28 December 2019. The miniseries features Darwin attempting to complete Elmore Junior High's yearbook by examining who he thinks should fill up the best spot.

==== The Gumball Chronicles ====
Another series of clip show episodes, titled The Gumball Chronicles, premiered on 5 October 2020, with The Curse of Elmore. On 2 November 2020, four more episodes (each beginning with Vote Gumball...and) themed around the 2020 United States presidential election were aired back-to-back, revolving around Gumball's attempts to get a running mate so he can run for school president.

== Production ==
When Cartoon Network Studios Europe was established in 2007, Ben Bocquelet was hired to help artists pitch their projects to Cartoon Network. During its early years, the London-based studio focused on creating pitches and pilot shorts, including a batch of six three-minute pilots produced in 2009 under the creative direction of Timothy Björklund. However, when the studio decided to have all employees pitch their own ideas, Bocquelet took several rejected characters he had created for commercial work and combined them into a single concept. The project, which became The Amazing World of Gumball, served as the development studio's first original series. Executive producers on the series included Bocquelet, Michael Carrington, Daniel Lennard, Sarah Fell, and Patricia Hidalgo. Fell's instrumental role in producing the series ultimately led to her promotion to Director of Original Kids Series for Turner EMEA in 2019. Lennard, then Vice President of Original Series and Development at Turner Broadcasting System Europe, approved production of the series.

Turner officially announced the series on 24 September 2009, initially commissioning forty 11-minute episodes. Thirty-six episodes were produced for its first season in collaboration with Studio Soi, Dublin-based Boulder Media, and Dandelion Studios. Prior to its premiere, the show was renewed for a second season in March 2011, followed by a third season in October 2012.

The production of The Amazing World of Gumball is noted for its mixed-media stylisation, which integrates traditional 2D animation, 3D CGI, puppetry, stop-motion, and live-action photographic backgrounds. To achieve this aesthetic, the studio employed a diverse international team of designers and visual artists, including background designers like Benjamin Flouw. The series also frequently incorporated the work of independent animators and digital artists, such as Julian Glander, to animate distinct 3D models and experimental segments. Narratively, the show's creative pipeline relied heavily on a storyboard-driven process—a signature of Cartoon Network's production model—which granted storyboard artists the freedom to dictate comedic timing, dialogue revisions, and visual gags before animation began.

On 17 February 2021, WarnerMedia announced during its upfront presentation that a television film based on the series was in development under the working title The Amazing World of Gumball Movie.

== Broadcast ==
A sneak-peek debuted on Cartoon Network UK on 2 May 2011, one day before the US premiere. The series would debut proper on the British Cartoon Network channel on 5 September. The first two seasons were released on Cartoon Network channels in over 126 countries, with the third season rolling out through 2014. Episodes of The Wonderfully Weird World of Gumball released on Hulu in the United States from 28 July 2025, and released on Cartoon Network and HBO Max internationally from 6 October.

The Amazing World of Gumball is available on video on demand services, and is available to stream. Episodes are available on Hulu and Netflix internationally, and were previously available to stream on HBO Max before being removed on 1 October 2024.

== Reception ==
=== Ratings ===
On 3 May 2011, the series premiere of The Amazing World of Gumball was watched by 2.120 million viewers in the United States.

=== Critical reception ===
The Amazing World of Gumball has received critical acclaim. In a favorable review, Brian Lowry of Variety described the series as "mostly a really clever spin on domestic chaos" and "first-rate silliness." Ken Tucker of Entertainment Weekly was also positive, writing: "There are few examples of mainstream children's programming as wildly imaginative, as visually and narratively daring, as The Amazing World of Gumball."

The A.V. Club's Noel Murray graded the DVD release of the series' first 12 episodes a B+, writing that "what sets [The Amazing World of Gumball] apart from the many other super-silly, semi-anarchic cartoons on cable these days is that it features such a well-developed world, where even with the eclectic character designs, there are recognisable traits and tendencies." Wired writer Z noted that the series "manages to have genuine heart even as the plots themselves transition from well-worn TV tropes to all out madness." Reviewing for Common Sense Media, Emily Ashby gave the show three out of five stars, noting its "over-the-top humor" and concluding that it is "a place where kids' wildest imaginings will likely come to pass."

The series has also gained attention for its video game and anime homages as well as its political satire. Writing for Kotaku, Narelle Ho Sang commended the show's pop culture parodies, highlighting its tribute to the Final Fantasy series. Gizmodo's Charles Pulliam-Moore praised its homage to Cowboy Bebop, calling it "downright incredible," and later praised its 2020 election special for its use of hindsight in discussing the United States presidential election. Academic analysis has also examined the series' use of different animation formats and live-action elements in relation to posthumanism and media.

=== Awards and nominations ===
Year	Award	Category	Nominee(s)	Result	Ref.
2011	Annecy International Animated Film Festival	Best Television Production	"The Quest"	Won	
2011	British Academy Children's Awards	Animation	The Amazing World of Gumball	Won	
2011	British Academy Children's Awards	Writer	Jon Foster and James Lamont	Won	
2011	Royal Television Society Awards	Children's Programme	"The Quest"	Nominated	
2012	Annie Awards	Best Animated Television Production for Children	The Amazing World of Gumball	Won	
2012	Annie Awards	Directing in a Television Production	Ben Bocquelet and Mic Graves	Nominated	
2012	Annie Awards	Music in a Television Production	Ben Locket	Nominated	
2012	Annie Awards	Voice Acting in a Television Production	Logan Grove	Nominated	
2012	British Academy Children's Awards	Animation	The Amazing World of Gumball	Won	
2012	British Academy Children's Awards	BAFTA Kids' Vote – Television	The Amazing World of Gumball	Nominated	
2012	British Academy Children's Awards	Writer	Ben Bocquelet, Jon Foster and James Lamont	Won	
2012	Broadcast Awards	Best Children's Programme	The Amazing World of Gumball	Nominated	
2012	International Emmy Kids Awards	Kids: Animation	The Amazing World of Gumball	Won	
2012	Irish Film & Television Awards	Children's/Youth Programme	The Amazing World of Gumball	Nominated	
2013	British Academy Children's Awards	Animation	The Amazing World of Gumball	Nominated	
2013	British Academy Children's Awards	BAFTA Kids' Vote – Television	The Amazing World of Gumball	Nominated	
2013	British Academy Children's Awards	Writer	The Amazing World of Gumball writing staff (Ben Bocquelet, Jon Brittain, Tom Crowley, Jon Foster, Mic Graves, Chris Garbutt, James Lamont and Tobi Wilson)	Won	
2014	British Academy Children's Awards	Animation	The Amazing World of Gumball	Nominated	
2014	British Academy Children's Awards	BAFTA Kids' Vote – Television	The Amazing World of Gumball	Nominated	
2014	British Academy Children's Awards	Writer	The Amazing World of Gumball writing staff	Nominated	
2015	British Academy Children's Awards	Animation	The Amazing World of Gumball (Ben Bocquelet, Mic Graves, Sarah Fell)	Won	
2016	British Animation Awards	Best children's series and Children's choice Award	"The Shell"	Won	
2016	Kids' Choice Awards	Favorite Cartoon	The Amazing World of Gumball	Nominated	
2016	British Academy Children's Awards	Animation	"The Money"	Won	
2016	British Academy Children's Awards	Writer	"The Origins Parts 1 & 2" writing staff (Ben Bocquelet, Mic Graves, Louise Coats, Nathan Auerbach, Daniel Berg, Joe Parham, Tobi Wilson, Ciaran Murtagh, Andrew Jones)	Won	
2017	British Academy Children's Awards	Animation	The Amazing World of Gumball	Nominated	
2017	British Academy Children's Awards	Writer	The Amazing World of Gumball writing staff	Nominated	
2017	European Animation Awards	Writing in a TV/Broadcast Production	The Amazing World of Gumball writing staff	Won	
2018	Annie Awards	Voice Acting in an Animated Feature Production	Nicolas Cantu	Nominated	
2018	Promax BDA Global Excellence Award 2018	Micro Video Content	"Christmas"	Won	
2018	British Academy Children's Awards	Comedy	The Amazing World of Gumball	Nominated	
2018	British Academy Children's Awards	Director	Mic Graves	Nominated	
2018	British Academy Children's Awards	Writer	The Amazing World of Gumball writing staff	Nominated	
2019	British Academy Children's Awards	Writer	The Amazing World of Gumball writing staff	Won	
2020	Kids' Choice Awards	Favorite Animated Series	The Amazing World of Gumball	Nominated	
2022	British Academy Children's Awards	Writer	Joe Markham, Mic Graves, Tony Hull	Won	
2022	British Academy Children's Awards	Director	Mic Graves	Nominated	

== Related media ==
=== Comics ===
On 18 June 2014, Boom! Studios began publishing The Amazing World of Gumball comic book series, which would end in 2015 after eight issues. The series was written by Frank Gibson and illustrated by Tyson Hesse. Eight original graphic novels were also released.

=== Home media ===
Region	Set title	Season(s)	Aspect ratio	Episode count	Time length	Release date
1	The DVD	1	16:9	12	132 minutes	28 August 2012 (re-released on 7 October 2014)
1	The Mystery	1	16:9	12	132 minutes	15 January 2013
4	The Amazing World of Gumball: Volume 1	1	16:9	12	132 minutes	3 July 2013
1	The Party	1	16:9	12	132 minutes	13 August 2013
4	The Amazing World of Gumball: Volume 2	1	16:9	12	132 minutes	2 April 2014
4	The Amazing World of Gumball: Volume 3	1	16:9	12	132 minutes	6 August 2014
2	Volume 1	1	16:9	12	138 minutes	6 October 2014
1	The Amazing World of Gumball: Volume 4	2	16:9	12	144 minutes	4 November 2014
4	The Complete First Season	1	16:9	36	396 minutes	5 August 2015
2	Volume 2	2	16:9	40	449 minutes	4 November 2019
1	The Complete Series	1–6	16:9	240	—	5 May 2026

=== Video games ===
Characters and locations from The Amazing World of Gumball are depicted in the crossover video game Cartoon Network: Battle Crashers.

== Future ==
=== Continuation ===
At the 2023 Annecy International Animation Film Festival, a seventh season of The Amazing World of Gumball was announced to be in production, initially without a confirmed release date. An EIDR listing revealed a registration for the seventh season. At the following year's festival, Warner Bros. Animation showcased the project during their slate presentation.

In May 2025, it was announced that the seventh season would officially be retitled The Wonderfully Weird World of Gumball, and released on Cartoon Network and HBO Max internationally. Bocquelet later explained that the name change was a deliberate choice to distinguish the Hulu-bound revival from the original Cartoon Network run, serving as a fresh jumping-on point for new audiences while reflecting the slightly more mature, surreal direction of the updated series. It was also announced that Alkaio Thiele, Hero Hunter, and Kinza Syed Khan were cast as the new voices of Gumball, Darwin, and Anais respectively, marking the first time Kyla Rae Kowalewski did not voice Anais. Teresa Gallagher and Dan Russell returned as Nicole and Richard Watterson. In exclusive interviews, the new cast members teased the revival's "unique spin" on the Watterson family. German-based Studio Soi and French-based Bobbypills provide animation and storyboard services, respectively. The show has been branded as a revival series, though during production it was continually referred to as the seventh season of The Amazing World of Gumball.

A release date of 28 July 2025 was confirmed in June 2025. The show began its international rollout on Cartoon Network and HBO Max on 6 October 2025. Another set of episodes comprising the second half of the first season (Note: Referred to by Cartoon Network as the second season) were released on 22 December 2025 on Hulu. In December 2025, a third and fourth season were ordered. Series creator Ben Bocquelet confirmed that the series would eventually resolve the cliffhanger ending of the season 6 finale, "The Inquisition", in an episode titled "The Rewrite".

=== Feature film ===
In an interview with The Times newspaper, series creator Ben Bocquelet mentioned plans for a feature film based on the series.

On 17 February 2021, WarnerMedia announced that a television film was in development. In April 2021, during Cartoon Network Studios Europe's rebranding as Hanna-Barbera Studios Europe, the studio confirmed the project was in development under the working title The Amazing World of Gumball Movie. On 21 September 2021, the film was officially greenlit under the title The Amazing World of Gumball: The Movie!, with Bocquelet serving as director and executive producer alongside Sam Register, Vanessa Brookman, and Sarah Fell. Written by Shane Mack, the film's premise focuses on a superfan who finds a missing episode of the show and accidentally opens a portal connecting his reality to Elmore, eventually joining forces with the Watterson family to save the town. The film was intended to serve as a conclusion to the original series and establish the world for the new companion series.

On 22 August 2022, parent company Warner Bros. Discovery announced that the film was one of six projects that would no longer debut on HBO Max as part of broader corporate restructuring. The film was instead shopped to a different outlet. During the 2024 Annecy International Animation Film Festival, Bocquelet confirmed that the film remained in active development, with revisions being made to the story and script.

As of now, no official release date or subsequent announcement about the film has been made public. An EIDR listing for the film gives 2024 as its date, but the listing does not establish that the film was released that year.
