= China Advertising Association =

Chinese advertising industry organization

The China Advertising Association (CAA) is a trade association for China's advertising industry.

== See also ==
- CAID (technology)
- Online advertising in China
