= Boulder Media =

Irish animation studio

Boulder Media Limited
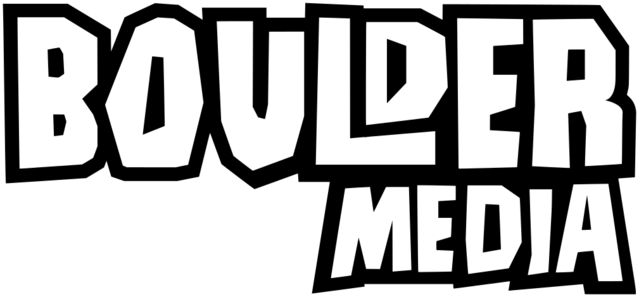
- Type: Subsidiary
- Founded: 2000; 26 years ago
- Founder: Robert Cullen
- Headquarters: Dublin, Ireland
- Key people: Colm Tyrrell (Head of Studio Production) Jenni MacNeaney (Head of Studio Operations) Paul O’Flanagan and Gillian Comerford (Creative Directors)
- Number of employees: 168 (2016)
- Parent: Hasbro (2016–2022); Princess Pictures (2022–present)
- Website: bouldermedia.tv

Boulder Media Limited is an Irish animation studio founded by filmmaker Robert Cullen in 2000. It is currently a wholly owned subsidiary of Australian media company Princess Pictures, which purchased the company in 2022 from its previous owner, Hasbro.

== History ==
The original logo used for the company from 2006, 2007 to 2012.

Cullen founded Boulder Media in 2000. On 13 July 2016, it became a subsidiary of Hasbro. Boulder Media opened a second location in August 2017 in Dublin on Claremont Road.

On 7 May 2019, Hasbro and Boulder Media announced a new animation film studio to be started. The companies bid on an old ferry terminal for the studio, but was turned down by the Dún Laoghaire-Rathdown County Council.

On 1 November 2022, Hasbro sold Boulder Media to Australian media company Princess Pictures, known for producing adult animation series Smiling Friends, YOLO, and Koala Man under its Bento Box Entertainment joint venture Princess Bento.

== Filmography ==
=== Animated series ===
Show	Year(s)	Co-production with	Network	Notes
Foster's Home for Imaginary Friends	2004–2009	Cartoon Network Studios	Cartoon Network	Animation services with Cartoon Network Studios
Shorty McShorts' Shorts	2006–07	Walt Disney Television Animation	Disney Channel	Animation services for the episodes "Horace & Boris in Got Your Nose", “Sunny County”, "Mascot Prep", "Troy Ride" and "Boyz on da Run"
Slacker Cats	2007	Laika; Film Roman	ABC Family	Animation services for the episode "Mexico"
El Tigre: The Adventures of Manny Rivera	2007–08	Mexopolis; Nickelodeon Animation Studio	Nickelodeon	Animation services
Funky Fables	2008–09	JAM Media	CBBC	Animation services
The Amazing World of Gumball	2011–12	Cartoon Network Development Studio Europe; Dandelion Studios; Studio SOI	Cartoon Network	Season 1
Randy Cunningham: 9th Grade Ninja	2012–15	Titmouse, Inc.	Disney XD	
Wander Over Yonder	2015–16	Disney Television Animation	Disney XD	Animation services for season 2
Danger Mouse	2015–19	Fremantle Kids & Family Entertainment (2015-2017) Boat Rocker Media (2018-19) CBBC Production	CBBC	
Go Jetters	2015–20	Giant Animation; BBC Studios; Blue-Zoo Productions (season 2)	CBeebies	
Dorothy and the Wizard of Oz	2017–20	Warner Bros. Animation	Boomerang SVOD	Animation services
Littlest Pet Shop: A World of Our Own	2018–19	Allspark Animation Hasbro	Discovery Family	
Transformers: Cyberverse	2018–21	Allspark Animation (seasons 1–3); Entertainment One (season 4)	Cartoon Network (seasons 1–3); Netflix (season 4)	
Transformers: Rescue Bots Academy	2019–21	Allspark Animation	Discovery Family	
DC Super Hero Girls	2019–21	Warner Bros. Animation	Cartoon Network	Animation services
My Little Pony: Pony Life	2020–21	Entertainment One; Hasbro	Discovery Family	
Transformers: BotBots	2022	Entertainment One; Hasbro	Netflix	
Captain Fall	2023	Writers & Models	Netflix	Animation services
Krapopolis	2023–present	Fox Entertainment Studios; Bento Box Entertainment	Fox	Main title animation; Animation services for season 2 onwards
Grimsburg	2024–present	Fox Entertainment; Bento Box Entertainment	Fox	Animation services
Micronauts	Unreleased	Entertainment One; Hasbro	N/A	
Living the Dream	2026	Cartoon Network Development Studio Europe	Netflix	Animation services

=== Shorts ===
Short	Year	Co-production with	Notes
Barber Shop	2005		
Carte de Visite	2006		
The Big Rock Candy Mountains	2006		
Beauty Now	2007		
Fresh Cut Grass	2014		
Brother Ezekiel	2020		
Cat Burglar	2022	Broke & Bones; Netflix Animation	Interactive film

=== Specials ===
Special	Year	Co-production with	Network	Notes
Adventures in Lalaloopsy Land: The Search for Pillow	2012	MGA Entertainment	Nick Jr. Channel	First Lalaloopsy film
My Little Pony: Equestria Girls – Canterlot Shorts	2017	Hasbro Studios	Discovery Family	
My Little Pony: Rainbow Roadtrip	2019	Allspark Animation	Discovery Family	

=== Feature films ===
Film	Year	Co-production with	Distributed by	Note
My Little Pony: A New Generation	2021	Entertainment One	Netflix	
Teen Titans Go! & DC Super Hero Girls: Mayhem in the Multiverse	2022	Warner Bros. Animation	Warner Bros. Home Entertainment	Animation services
