= Hanna-Barbera Studios Europe =

British animation studio

Hanna-Barbera Studios Europe Ltd.
- Logo used since 2021
- Formerly: Cartoon Network Development Studio Europe (2007–2021); Cartoon Network Studios Europe (2017–2021)
- Type: Label
- Industry: Animation
- Predecessor: Hanna-Barbera (in-name only)
- Founded: 18 September 2007; 19 years ago
- Headquarters: Warner Bros. UK 160 Old Street London, England (2007–2025); Chiswick Park Building 2 566 Chiswick High Road London, England (2025–present)
- Key people: Michael Ouweleen (co-president); Vanessa Brookman (co-president); Matt Matzkin (EVP/GM); Kelly Crews (SVP, production); Jay Bastian (SVP, current series); Audrey Diehl (SVP, kids/family); Jason DeMarco (SVP, action/anime series)
- Products: Television series; Feature films
- Parent: The Cartoon Network, Inc. (2007–2022); Warner Bros. Animation (2022–2026); Skydance Television Animation (2026–present)

Hanna-Barbera Studios Europe Ltd., formerly Great Marlborough Productions, Cartoon Network Development Studio Europe and Cartoon Network Studios Europe, is a British animation studio headquartered in London, England. It is owned by Skydance Television Animation. The studio was founded on 18 September 2007 as an EMEA sister studio of Cartoon Network Studios.

On 7 April 2021, WarnerMedia announced it had rebranded the studio to Hanna-Barbera Studios Europe, in honor of the original Hollywood-based studio and its co-founders William Hanna and Joseph Barbera. The Hanna-Barbera name had previously been revived on certain Warner Bros. Animation productions based on the classic franchises, including the fifth through thirteenth Scooby-Doo direct-to-video animated films, The Jetsons & WWE: Robo-WrestleMania! and the 2017 reboot of Wacky Races.

The first projects greenlit under the studio's new name were a film and a new series based on The Amazing World of Gumball, the latter of which ultimately became the seventh season of the original show and was titled The Wonderfully Weird World of Gumball.

== Filmography ==
=== Television series ===
Title	Creator(s)/ Developer(s)	Premiere	Co-production(s)	Network	Note(s)	Status
The Amazing World of Gumball	Ben Bocquelet	3 May 2011	Studio Soi; Boulder Media Limited (season 1); Dandelion Studios (season 1)	Cartoon Network (U.S.)		Ended
Elliott from Earth	Guillaume Cassuto; Mic Graves; Tony Hull	29 March 2021	Miyu Productions; Studio Soi	Cartoon Network (U.S.)		Ended
The Heroic Quest of the Valiant Prince Ivandoe	Eva Lee Wallberg; Christian Bøving-Andersen; Daniel Lennard	5 December 2022	Sun Creature Studio	Cartoon Network (U.K.); Cartoon Network (United States)		Ended
The Wonderfully Weird World of Gumball	Ben Bocquelet	28 July 2025	Studio Soi; Bobbypills	Cartoon Network (International only); Hulu (U.S.)	Revival of The Amazing World of Gumball	Ongoing
Living the Dream	George Gendi	18 December 2026	Boulder Media	Netflix	An adult-animated series	Upcoming
Foster's Funtime for Imaginary Friends	Craig McCracken	TBA		Cartoon Network (U.S.)	Spin-off of Foster's Home for Imaginary Friends.	Upcoming
Barbara!	Joris van Hulzen	TBA		Cartoon Network (U.S.)	Based on the children's book by Nadia Shireen.	In development
Hit Squad		TBA	Warner Bros. Animation; Anderson Entertainment; Mr Morris Productions	TBA	Adult-animated series	In development

=== Shorts series ===
Title	Creator(s)/ Developer(s)	Year(s)	Co-production(s)	Network	Note(s)
The Heroic Quest of the Valiant Prince Ivandoe	Eva Lee Wallberg; Christian Bøving-Andersen; Daniel Lennard	2017	Sun Creature Studio; Public Service Puljen	Cartoon Network Nordic (Denmark); YouTube (U.K.)	
Beast Boy: Lone Wolf	Rhys Byfield	2024	DC Studios	Cartoon Network (U.K.)	

=== Pilots ===
Title	Year	Creator(s)	Notes
Gumball	2008	Ben Bocquelet	Pilot for The Amazing World of Gumball.
The Amazing Adventures of Kid Cole & Klay	2008	Pete Candeland; Stu Connolly	
Little Rikke	2008	Rikke Asbjoern	
COSMO	2009	Charlie Bean	
Elliot's Zoo	2009	Dave Needham	
The Furry Pals	2009	Rikke Asbjoern	
Hamshanks and the Himalolly Mountain Railway	2009	Tom Parkinson	
Mutant Moments	2009	Alan Kerswell	
Pinky Malinky	2009	Chris Garbutt	Originally rejected by Cartoon Network, the pilot was later greenlit as a series by Nickelodeon, but instead of being aired on their TV channel, it was released directly on Netflix.
Verne on Vacation	2009	Sylvain Marc	
The ATM	2011	Rikke Asbjoern	
Wacky Races	2022	Rich Webber	Based on the original 1968 animated series.

=== Films ===
Title	Year	Co-production(s)	Notes
The Amazing World of Gumball: The Movie!	TBA	Studio Soi	In development; greenlit.

=== Short films ===
Title	Year	Co-production(s)	Notes
Taz	TBA	Warner Bros. Animation	In development; greenlit.

== Logos ==
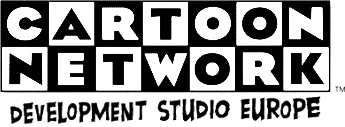
Former logo as Cartoon Network Development Studio Europe used for the first six seasons of The Amazing World of Gumball throughout its original run

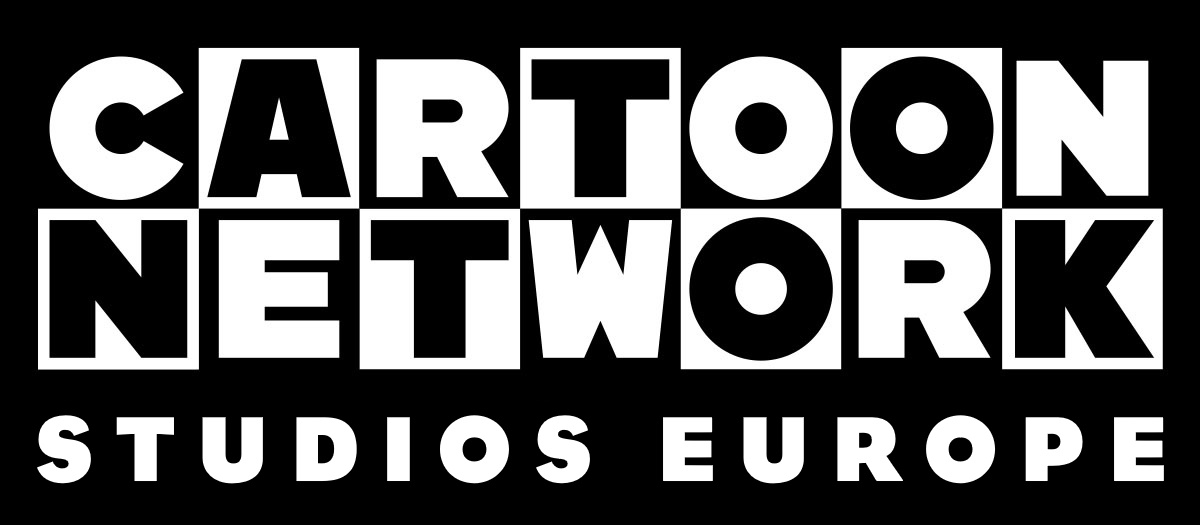
Former logo as Cartoon Network Studios Europe until the rebrand in 2021

An earlier version of the Hanna-Barbera Studios Europe logo in 2021 until being updated the same year

== See also ==
- Cartoon Network Studios, the original American equivalent of the studio
- Hanna-Barbera
- Warner Bros. Animation
- Warner Bros. Discovery EMEA
- List of animation studios owned by Warner Bros. Discovery
- Fat Dog Mendoza
- The Cramp Twins
- Robotboy
- Chop Socky Chooks
- Hero: 108
