= Saddiction =

2005 studio album by Hangman's Chair

Studio album by Hangman's Chair
- Released: 14 February 2025
- Recorded: May–June 2024; August 2024 (mixing)
- Studio: Sainte-Marthe (Paris)
- Genres: Gothic metal; doom metal; shoegaze
- Length: 46:49
- Label: Nuclear Blast Records
- Producers: Francis Caste; Hangman's Chair

Hangman's Chair chronology
A Loner (2022)	Saddiction (2025)

Saddiction is the seventh studio album by the French doom metal band Hangman's Chair, released on 14 February 2025 by Nuclear Blast Records. It continues the sonic shift initiated on their previous album, A Loner (2022), a style that led to them being labelled a goth band. Drummer Mehdi Thépegnier left the Paris region in 2024, making the production process for Saddiction more challenging, and the father of singer Cédric Toufouti died just before the band entered the studio. With Saddiction, Hangman's Chair offered their own take on post-punk.

As with A Loner, the band explored their post-punk and cold wave influences, albeit with less experimentation. Guitarist Julien Chanut used a Fender Bass VI while recording Saddiction, an album mixed in 5.1 surround sound. Saddiction combines gothic metal, modern melodic doom metal and shoegaze. It incorporates a diverse range of elements, including post-rock, and features cold wave guitar sounds and synthesisers. Lyrically, the album explores themes such as grief, failed romantic relationships, insomnia, addiction, depression, and leaving the urban environment of Paris. The cover artwork, created by Valnoir de Metastazis, as well as the album title, represents the band themselves.

Saddiction produced several singles; the first was "2 am Thoughts", followed by performances in Europe and the UK ahead of the album's release. The album received generally favourable reviews from music critics, who praised its sophisticated songwriting, dense atmosphere, contrasts, and nuanced ambience, and highlighted the eclecticism and expressiveness of Toufouti's vocals. Two critics also felt that the album took a somewhat meandering approach. Shortly after the album's release, the initial promotional tour in France and Belgium was cancelled for personal and logistical reasons. Saddiction was the band's last album before they entered an indefinite hiatus.

== Background ==
After signing with Nuclear Blast Records, the French doom metal band Hangman's Chair released their sixth album, A Loner, on 11 February 2022. The release of A Loner marked a shift in the band's sound, as they moved towards greater experimentation; the result was an album defined by "almost icy ambiences", to the point of being described as "cold-doom". By this stage, Hangman's Chair had evolved into a goth band, an identity cemented by the release of A Loner. The band undertook three tours to promote A Loner, and their signing with Nuclear Blast Records gave them moderate international visibility and the opportunity to perform a late-evening set just before Jerry Cantrell at France's Hellfest 2022. They toured with bands such as Paradise Lost, Igorrr, Amenra and Alcest.

== Recording and mixing ==
By 2024, the band members were no longer all based in the Paris region, as drummer Mehdi Thépegnier had moved to the Vendée department, complicating production and rehearsal sessions for the follow-up album to A Loner. Hangman's Chair produced the album Saddiction, which Francis Caste recorded in May and June 2024 at Studio Sainte-Marthe, his own studio in the 10th arrondissement of Paris. Guitarist Julien Chanut said that Caste "pushed us in a direction close to the live". He added that by changing his guitar's tuning, he was able to approach their music "from another prism", which boosted his creativity, while the Fender Bass VI he used during the recording brought "much more consistency" to the sound. Caste mixed and mastered the album in August 2024 at Studio Sainte-Marthe. Saddiction was mixed in 5.1 surround sound, noted Thépegnier.

== Music and lyrics ==
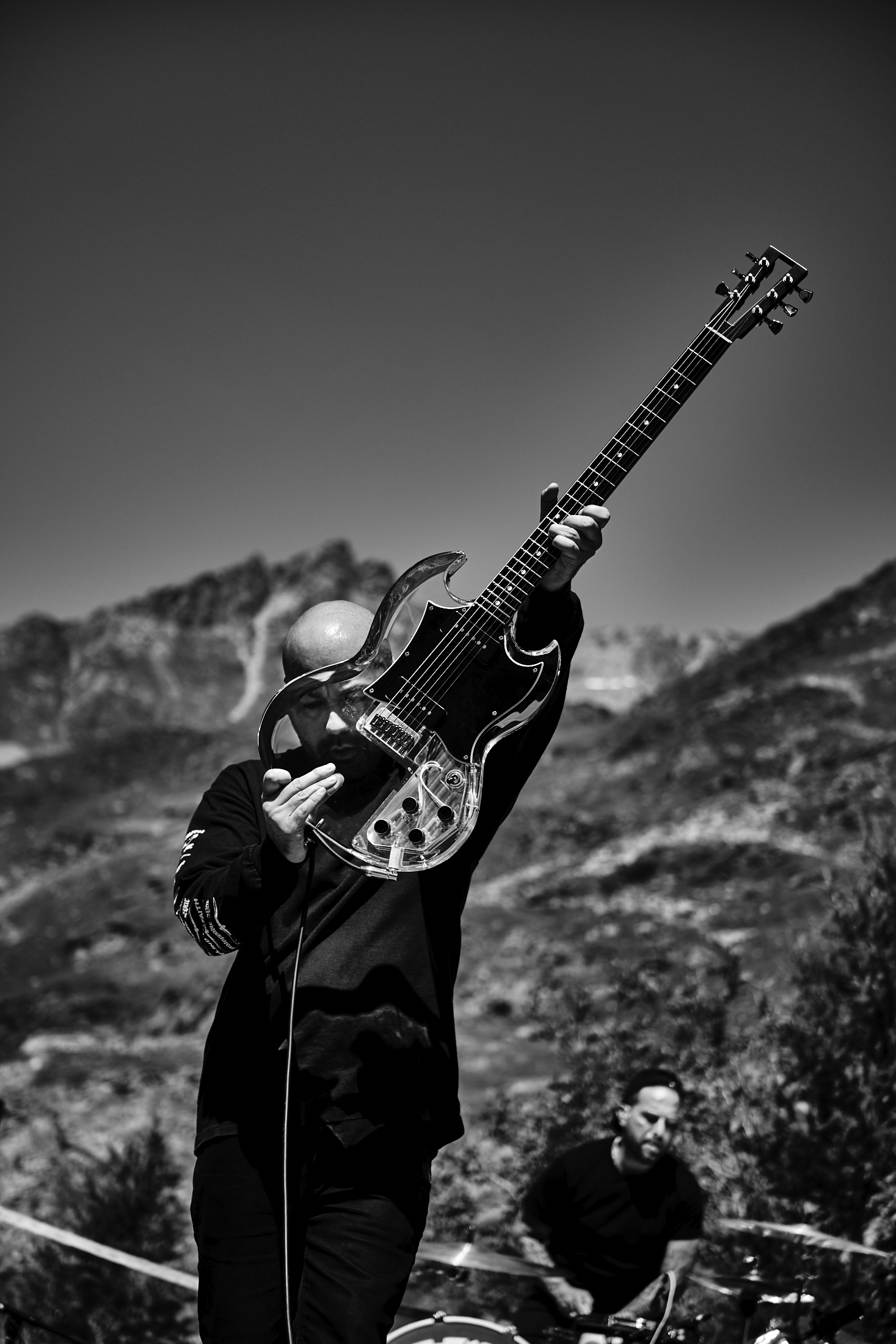
On Saddiction, Hangman's Chair offered their own take on post-punk

Saddiction was announced as the second instalment of a trilogy, with Hangman's Chair maintaining the same sonic direction that characterised A Loner. Singer Cédric Toufouti said they continued exploring their cold wave and post-punk influences, as well as experimenting with chorus effects and clean tones, much as they had done on A Loner. Nevertheless, they experimented less with Saddiction than they did with A Loner. Thépegnier stated that the group gravitated towards a "more of an ABAB verse/chorus/verse/chorus" rhyme scheme, aiming to get straight to the point and centre the music around a dominant riff. While certain personal situations of Chanut and Thépegnier inspired the lyrics to A Loner, Toufouti found in Saddiction a way to express his feelings about his father's death and a few failed romantic relationships.

The album opens with the eighties-style and "catchiness" of "To Know the Night", a song described as "how it would sound if Ozzy went shoegaze". "The Worst Is Yet to Come" features a gothic breakdown that highlights the band's hardcore roots. "In Disguise" builds into an anthemic sound, as the breakdown culminates, accompanied by diaphanous, multi-layered vocals. The gothic rock song "Kowloon Lights" takes its title from the once densely populated enclave located within the colony of Hong Kong. Rock & Folk's Clara Lemaire wrote that the song's title and the large block of buildings on the front cover of Sadditcion point to a city theme. Chanut responded by elaborating on the feeling of loneliness in crowds, particularly in large cities like Paris, as well as on the mobile phone culture where everyone is focused on their own things. However, he said it was mostly "a bit of a metaphor", as the city itself is not necessarily addressed in the song.

According to Hangman's Chair, the post-punk genre is "almost perfect", yet it could benefit from "bigger riffs"; Matt Mills of Metal Hammer noted that it was a reasoning that served as the primary factor behind "2 am Thoughts" and, more broadly, the album's creation. The song, characterised by its reverberant lead guitars and heavy chords, features a guest appearance by Raven van Dorst of Dool. "2 am Thoughts" is about waking up during the night with a flood of thoughts and being unable to fall back asleep, as well as addiction. Michel Valentin of Le Parisien highlighted the "cottony and melancholic" atmosphere of "In Disguise", "Kowloon Lights" and "2 am Thoughts".

The heaviness of the Bass VI's sound counterbalances the melancholic, glacial, and "shimmering" cold wave sounds of the guitar, which blend with atmospheric synthesisers, as noticeable on "Canvas" and the ambient "44 YOD". Before entering the studio, Toufouti slightly reworked the lyrics of "Neglect" to evoke his relationship with his father, who died a week and a half before Hangman's Chair entered the studio. Gavin Brown of Distorted Sound Magazine described "Neglect" as showcasing a "melancholy nature", with vocals that sound "brilliantly psychedelic and bewitching at the same time". The album's overall sound becomes more eclectic thanks to the vocals on the "epic" "Canvas" as well as on "Neglect".

Thépegnier composed "44 YOD" at his new residence near the ocean, having left behind the urban environment of Paris, which, he said, had left him feeling depressed. The title "44 YOD" stands for "Forty-four years of depression", Toufouti said. Chanut recounted a WhatsApp conversation in which bassist Clément [Hanvic] mentioned, on the occasion of his birthday, that he had gone through 44 years of depression. "Healed?" concludes Saddiction; it begins with a hard-hitting riff that, as Brown described, rapidly evolves "into a melding of true power and sheer beauty" and is the album's heaviest song.

Dominik Winter of Metal Hammer Germany drew connections between certain songs and the names of various bands: "In Disguise" to Type O Negative and Sleep Token; "2 am Thoughts" to Life of Agony; "Kowloon Lights" to Paradise Lost; "Canvas" to Duran Duran and the Jesus and Mary Chain; and "44 YOD" to the Gathering.

The album's sound encompasses elements of dark metal, shoegaze, pop, post-rock, gothic rock and alternative rock, aligning it with the sonic direction taken on A Loner. Saddiction has "roots still metal", wrote Valentin, "but with numerous more atmospheric, gothic, even 'cold wave' passages".

Based on the track "Kowloon Lights", Metal Hammer's Rich Hobson wrote prior to the release of Saddiction that the album would combine melodic doom metal and gothic metal. Upon its release, Daniel Cordova of Metal Injection described Saddiction as a "Gothic metal/doom" album. Hesher Keenan of MetalSucks said the album combines gothic metal, doom metal and shoegaze. A staff reviewer at Metal Storm later opined that the album's sound does not necessarily fall strictly into the "gothic doom" category, but rather represents a blend of goth and doom; as examples, he cited artists such as Planning for Burial and Chelsea Wolfe, specifically pointing to their heavier passages.

Lemaire felt that Toufouti's voice was "a bit pop", while the Metal Storm reviewer compared his vocals to those of Phil Collins. Ronny Bittner of Rock Hard wrote that Toufouti's "soulful singing" brings "some warmth into the reverberated, gloomy sound through skilful harmonic shifts".

== Title and cover artwork ==
Saddiction, a portmanteau, means "Addiction To Sadness". Chanut initially considered titling the album "Healed?", but the band members ultimately opted for a title that, in their view, best represented not the album but Hangman's Chair themselves, capturing "this duality between sadness and addiction". The title of the seventh album was unveiled in November 2024.

Chanut stated that Valnoir de Metastazis, who generally works for black metal bands, created the artwork based on what Hangman's Chair represents to him, namely a block of buildings. Journalist Pierre-Antoine Riquart described the alternative album cover art as depicting neon lights shaped like a man about to commit suicide.

== Release and promotion ==
The first single, "2 am Thoughts", was released in October 2024, accompanied by a music video featuring Kéo Nackphouminh, the original singer of Hangman's Chair, who did not remain with the band for long. The camera follows him over the course of a day as he has embraced a healthier lifestyle over the past three years, combining spiritual exploration with sports. In the same month, Hangman's Chair embarked on a co-headlining tour with Dool, the "Currents Colliding European Tour 2024", which also included dates in the UK. "Kowloon Lights" was released as a single alongside a music video in November. The band performed at Damnation Festival 2024 in Manchester, England. On 17 December 2024, Lemaire announced the release date for Saddiction.

In January 2025, Hangman's Chair released the single "In Disguise" Saddiction was released on 14 February 2025 through Nuclear Blast Records. "Healed?" and its music visualiser were released in mid-February. "The Worst Is Yet to Come" was released shortly after as a single, accompanied by a video shot on a mobile phone during a journey on a suburban train in Paris. In February, a tour in France, focusing on the suburbs, and Belgium was announced for Hangman's Chair, alongside the band Fange, as well as a performance at the Motocultor Festival for the coming summer.

Subsequently, the French concert venues Le Temps Machine in Joué-lès-Tours and La Vapeur in Dijon announced the cancellation of the Hangman's Chair tour and the initiation of refunds for tickets already purchased, with the band citing "personal and logistical reasons". In mid-November 2025, the group announced on their social media channels that they were taking a "hiatus for an indefinite period" and told fans their online store would close on 31 December, adding that "the shop will reopen as soon as the band becomes active again".

== Critical reception ==
Professional ratings
Review scores
Source	Rating
Distorted Sound Magazine	9/10
Metal.de	8/10 stars
Metal Hammer	8/10 marks
New Noise	9/10
Le Parisien	4/5
Rock Hard	7.5/10
Rolling Stone France	3.5/5 stars

Brown commended the band's musical evolution and called it "spectacular", noting that the album's songs were not limited to "huge riffs"; they also incorporate "huge swathes of melody, heaviness and a kaleidoscopic and dreamlike vibe all colliding to create a supreme listening experience". Brown praised the band for having "not only made their most accomplished album to date but a whole mesmerising and stunning musical journey". The Metal Storm reviewer stated that "the songs are really damn good".

Marc Thorbrügge of Metal.de praised the "sophisticated songwriting" and "the full production" that "staged" this "modern doom" in a "rare" manner, both "stirring and bitter". He said that Saddiction is a "grower" with an atmosphere that develops increasingly dense and deepens immersion with repeated listens. Thorbrügge added that this "numbing effect" eventually ends up "blurring the boundaries between the songs" and "thereby diluting the highlights", which, in his view, is "the only flaw in this otherwise very good album". Winter rated the album "4.5/7", stating that this time the band have "more brain glue in the tube and increases the danger of addiction" with that "ubiquitous" Cure-esque touch; he added that, while they "never copy" anyone, they frequently nod to their influences. He was less receptive during the album's final third, finding the songs too long.

In his review of Saddiction for Metal Hammer, Chris Chantler wrote, "Gothic, Gallic miserablists find a radiance beyond the gloom", adding that Toufouti's "open-hearted melodic vocal harmonies have much improved, proving higher in pitch and more expressive than most goth crooners". Bittner remarked that the Parisians are "no longer as blatantly suicidal" as they were during the Hope /// Dope /// Rope era, given that "their music thrives more than ever on contrasts", with the album punctuated by "small bright spots" brought about by Toufouti's singing style. He also praised the contrast between melodic semi-acoustic guitar work and heavy doom riffs. Bittner regretted that the band only infrequently turned this "promising dynamic" into "conclusive, to-the-point songs".

Mathieu David of Rolling Stone France drew a parallel between "the harshest ambiences of Banlieue Triste" and the riffs on Saddiction, noting that, despite this, the band "retains a certain sense of lightness" in the vein of A Loner, while continuing to move forwards. He stated that "this alliance finds its full coherence thanks to the talent of Hangman's Chair, who handles ambiences with nuance and passion". Olivier Drago, editor-in-chief of the French print magazine New Noise, gave a rating of "9/10", highlighting the "impressive vocal work" and wrote that the album is "[n]either better nor worse" than A Loner, while noting that they opted for shorter songs in an effort to achieve greater efficiency.

== Track listing ==
All music and lyrics are written by Hangman's Chair. Track titles and running times are adapted from the liner notes of Saddiction and Dork magazine.

Saddiction track listing
No.	Title	Length
1.	"To Know the Night"	4:23
2.	"The Worst Is Yet to Come"	3:53
3.	"In Disguise"	5:54
4.	"Kowloon Lights"	3:59
5.	"2 am Thoughts" (featuring guest vocals by Raven van Dorst)	4:35
6.	"Canvas"	4:55
7.	"Neglect"	5:37
8.	"44 YOD"	6:27
9.	"Healed?"	7:03
Total length:		46:49

== Personnel ==
Credits adapted from the liner notes of Saddiction.

Hangman's Chair

- Cédric Toufouti – vocals
- Mehdi Thépegnier – drums and machines
- Julien Chanut – guitars and Bass VI
- Clément Hanvic – bass

Additional musicians

- Charles Caste – additional machines on "In Disguise"

Technical and production

- Hangman's Chair – producers
- Francis Caste – recording, mixing, mastering

Visuals and imagery

- Metastazis – artwork
- Andy Julia – band picture

== Charts ==
Chart performance for Saddiction
Chart (2025)	Peak position
French Albums (SNEP)	198
French Top Physical Albums (SNEP)	40
French Rock & Metal Albums (SNEP)	13
