= Hangman's Chair =

French doom metal band

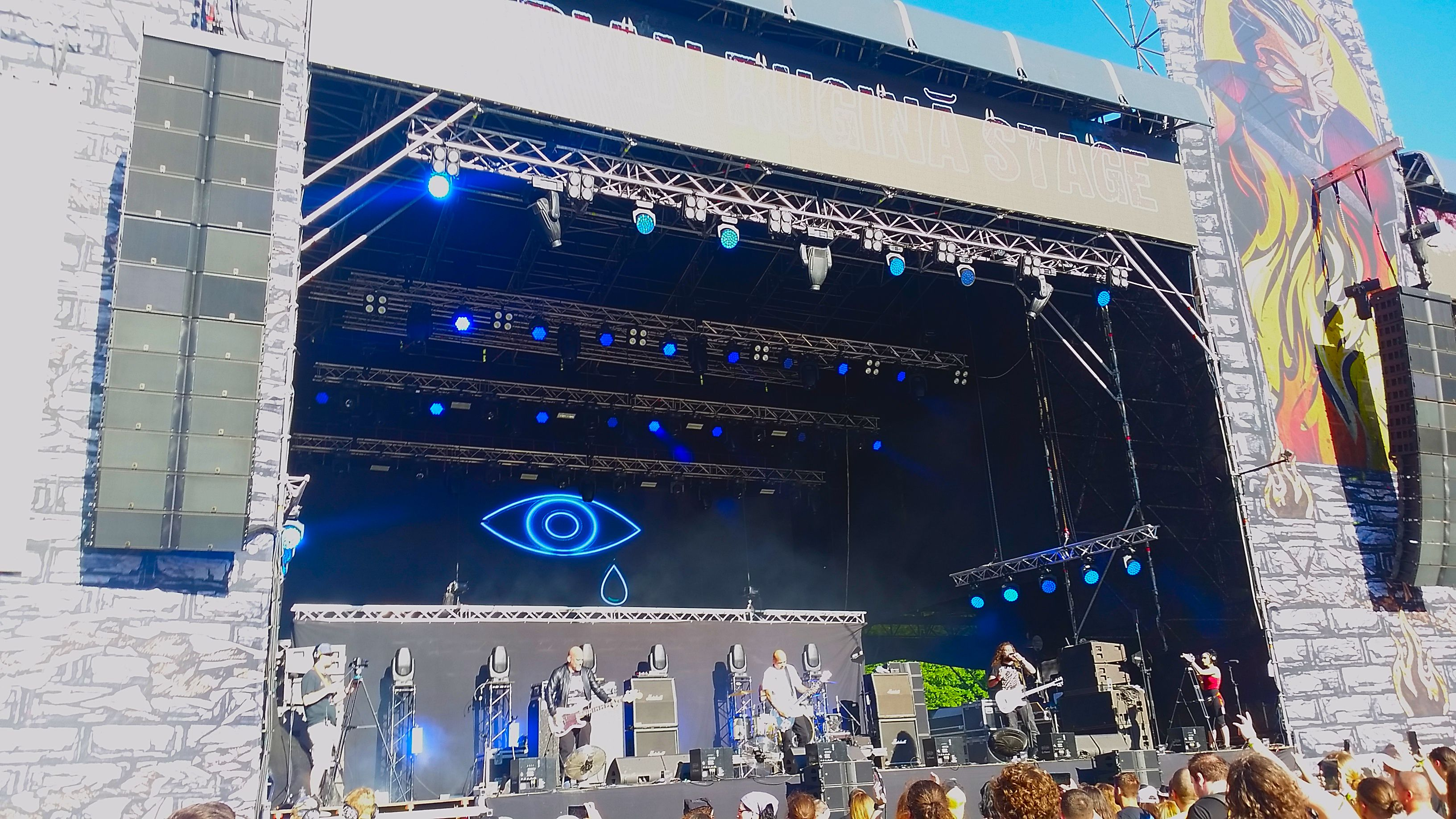
- Hangman's Chair in 2023

Background information
- Origin: Crosne, Essonne, France
- Genres: Doom metal; gothic metal; sludge metal (early); stoner doom (early)
- Years active: 2005–2025
- Labels: Bones Brigade; Music Fear Satan; Spinefarm; Nuclear Blast
- Past members: Julien Rour Chanut; Mehdi Birouk Thépegnier; Sid-Ahmed Azzouni; Kéo Nackphouminh; Adrien Lederer; Bernard Quarante; Clément Hanvic; Cédric Toufouti
- Website: hangmanschair.com

Hangman's Chair were a French doom metal band formed in Crosne, Essonne, in 2005. The group's final lineup consisted of vocalist and guitarist Cédric Toufouti, guitarist Julien Rour Chanut, bassist Clément Hanvic and drummer Mehdi Birouk Thépegnier.

Coming from the hardcore punk scene, Chanut, Thépegnier and Sid-Ahmed Azzouni formed Hangman's Chair after playing in several bands. Hangman's Chair released their debut album, (A Lament for...) The Addicts (2007), with Kéo Nackphouminh on vocals. After Nackphouminh's departure and the group's reconfiguration in 2008, they released Leaving Paris in 2010. Azzouni died in 2010.

With a stable lineup in place, Hangman's Chair launched an album trilogy, beginning with Hope /// Dope /// Rope (2012), which marked a slight sonic evolution while remaining within the doom, stoner and sludge metal designations. This Is Not Supposed To Be Positive (2015) introduced gothic rock and cold wave influences into their sound. On their fifth album, Banlieue Triste (2018), the band began adopting a more introspective style focused on personal themes and showcasing their blend of doom metal and post-punk atmospherics. They then signed with Spinefarm Records for worldwide releases and also received media exposure in France.

Hangman's Chair left Spinefarm and signed with Nuclear Blast Records in 2021. They began a new trilogy with A Loner (2022), which marked a turning point in their production approach as the band experimented, ultimately resulting in a gothic-doom and more melodic sound. Picking up where A Loner left off, Saddiction (2025) saw the band further explore the sonic aspects and post-punk and cold wave facets of their influences. Their lyrics generally explore dark and gloomy themes, set against the backdrop of urban landscapes, primarily in Paris and its suburbs. Their discography demonstrates a gradual transition towards a clean singing voice. Hangman's Chair suspended their activities in November 2025 for an indefinite period.

== History ==
=== Origins (1992–2004) ===
Julien Rour Chanut grew up in the Essonne department, south of Paris, in France. Mehdi Birouk Thépegnier, born in Morocco (Maghreb), arrived in France at the age of 12. They met in 1992 at a college in Essonne and became friends. Chanut and Thépegnier were passionate about 1990s hardcore punk, heavy metal and grunge. The hardcore scene consisting of bands such as Confusion, Integrity, Only Living Witness, Section 8, and Sheer Terror, and the do-it-yourself philosophy associated with this culture, motivated them to perform music. Chanut found his path between the ages of 13 and 14 by beginning to play hardcore punk. The two friends first stepped onto the stage at around 15 or 16.

They grew up in the hardcore punk scene of the 1990s. Thépegnier was a member of Mouvement Colère (lit. 'Anger Movement') and later a bassist in Drowning, which toured as the opening act for All Out War and Merauder. Over time, Chanut and Thépegnier performed in various local bands, including Arkangel (band), Es La Guerilla and Rising Dust. Clément Hanvic was part of their circle; he was the singer of Knockoutz and the bassist of L'Esprit du Clan (lit. 'The Spirit of the Clan'), and performed with Es La Guerilla. The bassist for Knockoutz and Es La Guerilla was Kéo Nackphouminh. Sid-Ahmed Azzouni was a guitarist in Es La Guerilla. After playing electric bass for a while, Thépegnier switched to drums.

The members of Es La Guerilla wanted to move in a different musical direction, but had rehearsed very little with Kévone, the band's singer, before entering the recording studio. Kévone was less interested in the band's new direction. After a while, Nackphouminh tried his hand at singing.

=== Formation and (A Lament for...) The Addicts (2005–2007) ===
In 2005, Chanut (guitar), Thépegnier (drums), and Azzouni (guitar) formed the metal band Hangman's Chair in Crosne, Essonne. Es La Guerilla was then put on hold.

Hangman's Chair began by releasing a split album with the [French] band Eibon. Their first singer was Nackphouminh. The band's first album, (A Lament for...) The Addicts, was released in 2007, via the label Bones Brigade Records, with Chanut, Thépegnier, Nackphouminh (vocals), Adrien Lederer (guitar), and Bernard Quarante (bass). Although the split with Eibon was released before (A Lament for...) The Addicts, as an introduction to the band, the actual recording took place after that first album's completion. Some songs originally intended to appear under the name Es La Guerilla appeared on Hangman's Chair's first album. Hangman's Chair's first bassist was originally the singer of the band Every Reason To...

Chanut later told Clara Lemaire of Rock & Folk that Nackphouminh had not stayed in the band for long, as he went through "a lot of bad moments".

=== Lineup change, Azzouni's death and Leaving Paris (2008–2011) ===
Cédric Toufouti was a guitarist in the band Inhatred.

In 2008, Hangman's Chair were joined by Hanvic, who became the bassist, and Toufouti, who took over as singer-guitarist.

In 2010, Azzouni died in a car accident. "One Love Reunion", an evening paying homage to Azzouni, took place at Glazart on 11 March 2010, featuring concerts by Hangman's Chair, Es La Guerilla, Knockoutz and L'Esprit du Clan. Leaving Paris, the band's second album, was released the same year, through Bones Brigade Records, with Chanut, Thépegnier, Hanvic, Toufouti, and Lederer in the lineup.

In 2011, Hanvic was busy for a few months with L'Esprit du Clan and was replaced by Every Reason To... bassist Christophe Marconato for concert dates.

=== Hope /// Dope /// Rope and This Is Not Supposed To Be Positive (2012–2017) ===
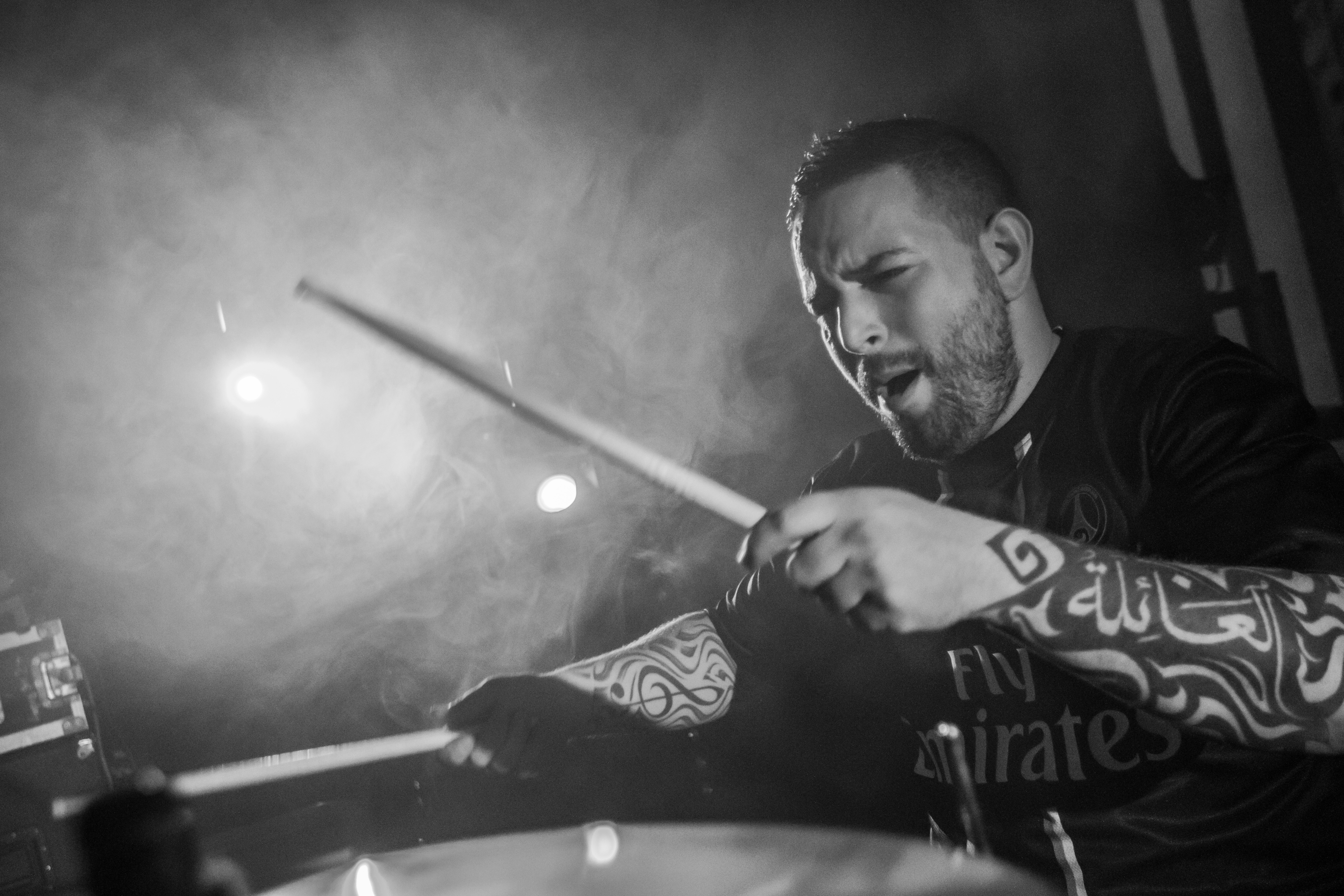
Thépegnier performing at Magasin 4 in Brussels, Belgium, in September 2012

Hangman's Chair were in the habit of recording three or four additional tracks at each studio session for their albums, intended for split-album releases. A split from Hangman's Chair and Drawers was released on 28 March 2012. The following album, Hope /// Dope /// Rope, was released in 2012, via Bones Brigade Records. The album "marked a turning point in our history", said Thépegnier, as the band found "stability" with the arrival of Toufouti and Hanvic, as well as "a musical identity". Documentalist Eric Guillaud wrote that Hope /// Dope /// Rope helped the band make a name for themselves "within the metal community".

On 1 February 2014, Hangman's Chair performed at the second edition of JP Fest, a festival that brought together six French metal bands to raise funds for the fight against cancer at the Splendid in Lille. All profits were donated to the Ligue contre le cancer (lit. 'League Against Cancer'), the Lille-based research department of the Oscar-Lambret Centre and the association Accompagnement en Soins Palliatifs (ASP Omega) (lit. 'Accompaniment in Palliative Care'). Their split LP with Acid Deathtrip was released through Reflections Records during the summer of 2014.

The band's next album, This Is Not Supposed To Be Positive, was released on 15 September 2015 via the Parisian independent record label Music Fear Satan. The album's release was preceded by a music video for "Dripping Low". Lelo Jimmy Batista, writing for Vice France, described the album as "A kind of Black Sabbath lost at Porte de la Chapelle, an Alice in Chains stranded at Stalingrad".

At the beginning of March 2016, Hangman's Chair performed at Le Mondial du Tatouage, a major annual international tattoo convention held at the Grande halle de la Villette in Paris.

During a tour in Japan with Arkangel, Chanut met the members of Greenmachine. Hangman's Chair subsequently recorded a split album with Greenmachine, released in France through Music Fear Satan and in Japan through Daymare Recordings in February and March 2017, respectively. Jacob Bannon expressed appreciation for the split. A music video for "Can't Talk" was released; it was made by Hanvic using excerpts from one of Brigitte [Lahaie]'s old pornographic films.

=== Banlieue Triste (2018–2020) ===
Hangman's Chair's fifth album, Banlieue Triste (lit. 'Sad Suburb'), was released in March 2018 through Music Fear Satan. The album features two guest contributions: one from Marc De Backer of Mucky Pup on "Sidi Bel Abbes", and the other from French synthwave musician Perturbator on "Tired Eyes". Banlieue Triste spawned a music video for "Naive" released in April 2018, starring French actor Nicolas Duvauchelle. Duvauchelle, who was part of the Parisian hardcore scene with his band Cry Havoc and is a longtime friend of Hangman's Chair, stated: "I didn't hesitate for a second. They're such a negative band, and I love it". He played his part as a volunteer. In May, a music video for "Touch the Razor", produced by 12jours (lit. '12days'), was released on Vimeo. On 15 June, they performed at Download Festival France at the Brétigny-sur-Orge Air Base 217.

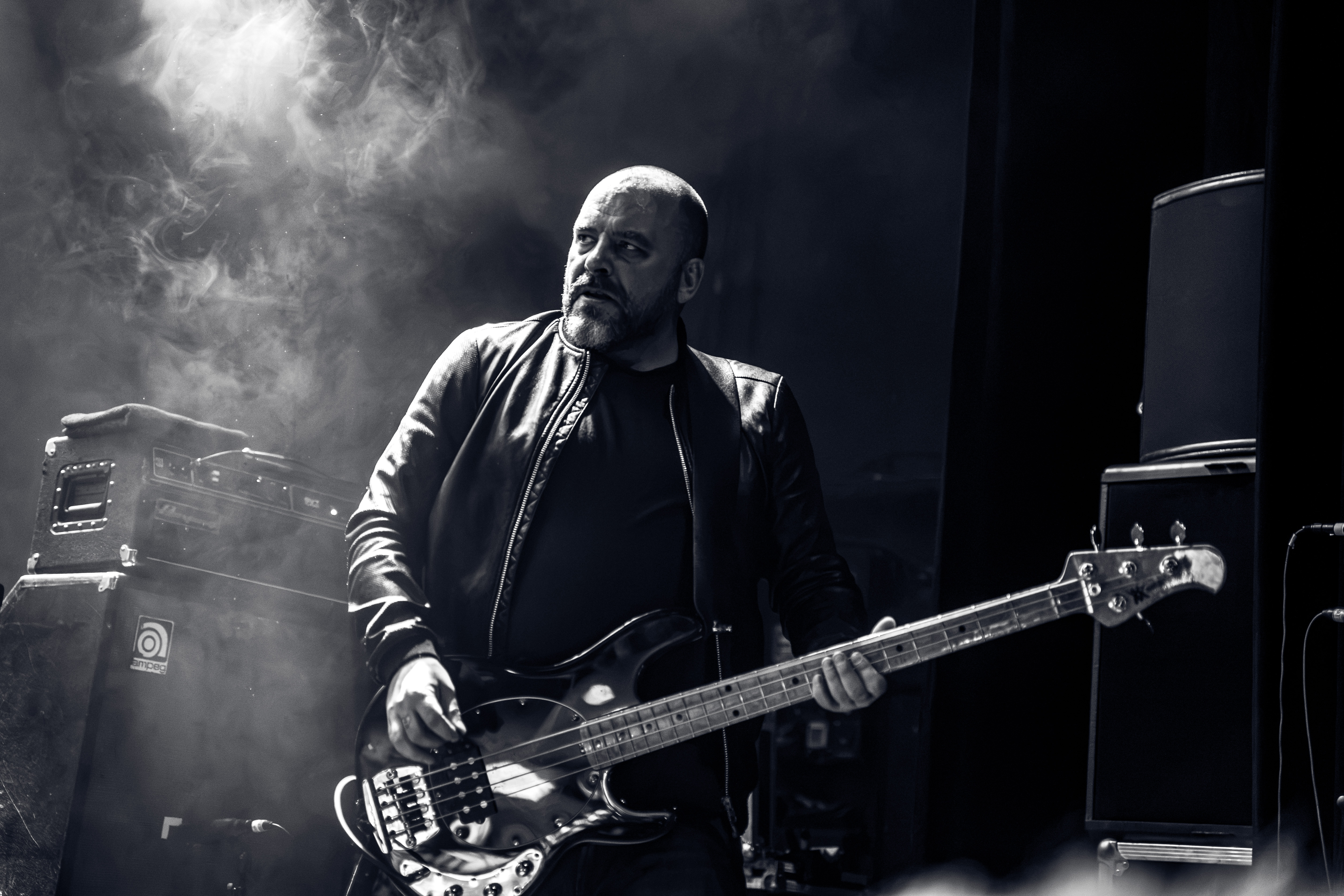
Hanvic performing at La Cigale in Paris, France, in December 2018

Banlieue Triste was already attracting attention, wrote Frank Colombani of Le Monde, and the band were therefore courted by the Spinefarm Records label. Spinefarm Records released the album on 28 September 2018 in all territories outside France. A special double-vinyl edition of the album was released simultaneously, following the signing of the quartet Chanut, Thépegnier, Hanvic, and Toufouti to Spinefarm Records, thereby guaranteeing worldwide distribution for their future recordings.

Hope /// Dope /// Rope, This Is Not Supposed To Be Positive and Banlieue Triste "are part of a whole", thus constituting a "trilogy", Chanut said. Banlieue Triste led the band to appear on the French television channel Canal+ for a short concert on the programme L'album de la Semaine (lit. 'Album of the Week'), to be broadcast on FIP and France Inter, and to be featured in articles in the general-interest press. While the band frequently toured the Upper France region during the winter of 2018, they opened for Zeal & Ardor at L'Aéronef in Lille and for Samael in Dunkirk. They regularly performed in Belgium and the Netherlands because their manager was based in Lille.

On 16 August 2019, Hangman's Chair performed at the Psycho Las Vegas festival in Nevada, US. Hangman's Chair and the post-black metal band Regarde Les Hommes Tomber (lit. 'Watch Men Fall') performed together on Le Trianon's stage in Paris on 25 September 2019, during an evening themed around the Major Arcana and featuring a total of three collaborative acts, as part of the Red Bull Music Festival. In October, they released a four-track EP titled Bus de Nuit (lit. 'Night Bus'), featuring two previously unreleased tracks and two remixes. The EP was preceded by the single "Lost Brothel".

The joint concert of Hangman's Chair and Regarde Les Hommes Tomber was set to be repeated at the Roadburn Festival 2020; however, it could not take place due to the coronavirus pandemic.

=== A Loner (2020–2023) ===
Chanut stated that Hangman's Chair recorded the album A Loner from December 2020 to January 2021, or, according to Thépegnier, until February 2021, with a view to an October release, but concert cancellations delayed it.

Thépegnier indicated that the band's relationship with their former labels, Bones Brigade and Music Fear Satan, had always gone well. They had high expectations for Spinefarm Records, but ultimately, things did not go as planned. "Communication with Spinefarm has become very complicated", said Thépegnier. To amicably terminate their contract, Hangman's Chair initiated negotiations through their new manager. They were approached by the German and French offices of Nuclear Blast Records. The deal had accelerated after the opening of the French office because the band had already been in contact with the German office since This Is Not Supposed To Be Positive. Following their signing with Nuclear Blast Records, they released a new single titled "Cold & Distant" on 21 May 2021, accompanied by its music video featuring French actress Béatrice Dalle. Perturbator asked Hangman's Chair to collaborate on his song "God Says", from his 2021 album, Lustful Sacraments.

Due to the coronavirus pandemic, the annual Hellfest could not take place, but a 15-minute live session from the band was made available on the festival's website in June 2021. It was part of a series of twenty performances titled Hellfest from Home, recorded shortly before at the festival site in Clisson, France. That same month, Hangman's Chair were part of the lineup for the second and final edition of the online metal music festival Slay at Home, organised by Frank Godla, co-owner of Metal Injection. Slay at Home aimed to raise funds for MusiCares, the Cancer Research Institute, the Iggy Fund and the National Alliance on Mental Illness. In early October 2021, the band released the single "Loner" with a music video. Another single titled "An Ode To Breakdown" followed in November, accompanied by a live video taken from the at-home edition of Hellfest. During the recording sessions for their upcoming album, Hangman's Chair had set aside two songs, including "Judge Penitent". It was released as a single at the beginning of December and became the theme music for the fifth season (2021) of Gang Stories, a Deezer-produced podcast narrated by NTM rapper JoeyStarr.

Hangman's Chair on stage at France's Hellfest 2022. Left to right: Toufouti, Chanut and Hanvic

On 3 January 2022, Hangman's Chair appeared on the Culturebox program on France 4. A Loner was released in February 2022. The band released the single "Who Wants To Die Old" alongside a music video directed by Oscar Bizarre, filmed before "Cold & Distant". A piece was finally performed by the pairing of Hangman's Chair and Regarde Les Hommes Tomber at the Roadburn Festival 2022 in Tilburg, Netherlands. On 23 June 2022, Arte Concert and Rolling Stone France teamed up to broadcast live the band's performance at Hellfest on YouTube. On 26 June, Hangman's Chair collaborated once again with the Nantes-based band Regarde Les Hommes Tomber to perform together on the Valley stage at Hellfest. The band performed at Les Francofolies in La Rochelle, France, and at other music festivals, and toured for five weeks with Paradise Lost. Hangman's Chair were ranked first in the "Best French Bands/Artists" category on the editorial staff's year-end list of Guitar Part, a French monthly print magazine aimed at guitarists.

In March 2023, Hangman's Chair presented a previously unreleased track, the six-minute single "Spleenwise". This was followed by a European tour with Igorrr, during which they served as a supporting act, alongside Amenra and Der Weg einer Freiheit. In 2023, Hangman's Chair were encouraged by their label to release a short, three-minute documentary titled A Portrait, directed by Kendy Ty, in which the band members recount their career and the A Loner era in a condensed and introspective way. For the documentary, the musicians returned to their neighbourhood, the school, and the playground where they grew up. The band performed at Belgium's Dour Festival 2023.

=== Saddiction and hiatus (2024–present) ===
At the beginning of February 2024, Hangman's Chair returned to perform at Le Mondial du Tatouage – Tattoo Planetarium, which brought together 500 tattoo artists from around the world, at Paris' Grande halle de la Villette. In October 2024, the band released the single "2 am Thoughts" and its music video, taken from the upcoming seventh album, Saddiction. "2 am Thoughts" features a guest appearance from Raven van Dorst of Dool. The music video follows Nackphouminh, the original singer of Hangman's Chair, through a day in his life three years after he adopted a healthier lifestyle combining sport and spiritual exploration. He is the author of the video's closing line. The band went on a European tour with Dool in October. They released the single "Kowloon Lights" in November.

Saddiction was released on 14 February 2025 through Nuclear Blast Records, with the group's lineup remaining unchanged: Chanut, Thépegnier, Hanvic, and Toufouti. A Loner and Saddiction would be part of a new trilogy. The album entered at number 13 on the French SNEP–SCPP Rock and Metal Chart compiled by the OCC. Mathieu David of Rolling Stone France wrote that Hangman's Chair "continues to weave their simultaneously heavy and hovering ambiences amidst mysterious urban landscapes". He added that while A Loner "hovered at 10,000 feet in an ethereal cloud, Saddiction brings back the riffs, not without reminding the harshest ambiences of Banlieue Triste". Other singles followed: "In Disguise", "Healed?", and "The Worst is Yet to Come".

In mid-November 2025, Hangman's Chair announced on their social media that the band were taking a "hiatus for an indefinite period" and that their online merchandise store would close on 31 December. They added that "the shop will reopen as soon as the band becomes active again". In December 2025, Hangman's Chair were included on Rock Sound France's "Top 20 French rock bands" list, which encompassed musical groups from the 1970s–1980s era to the present day.

== Musical style ==
=== Influences and inspirations ===
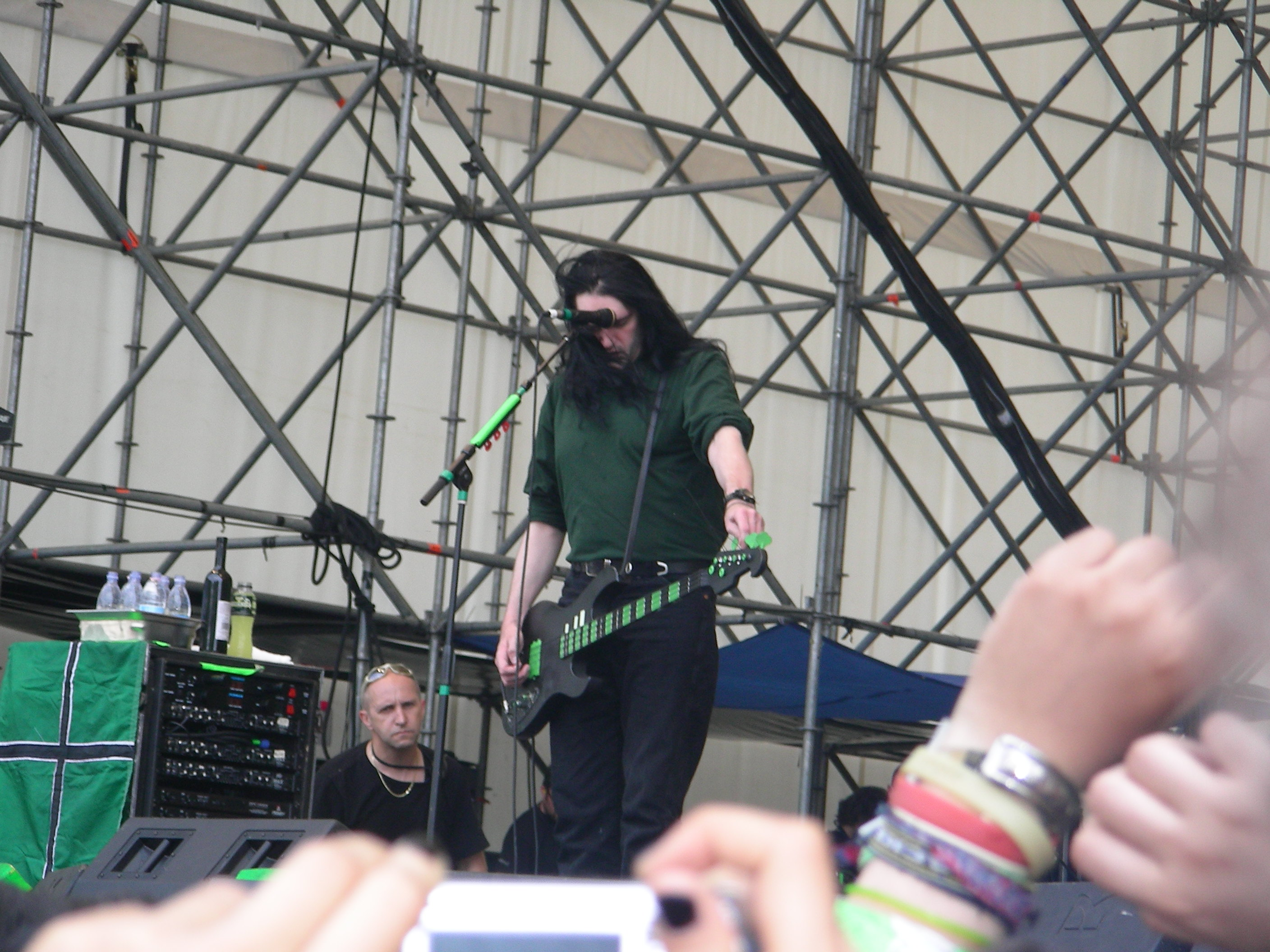
Peter Steele of Type O Negative

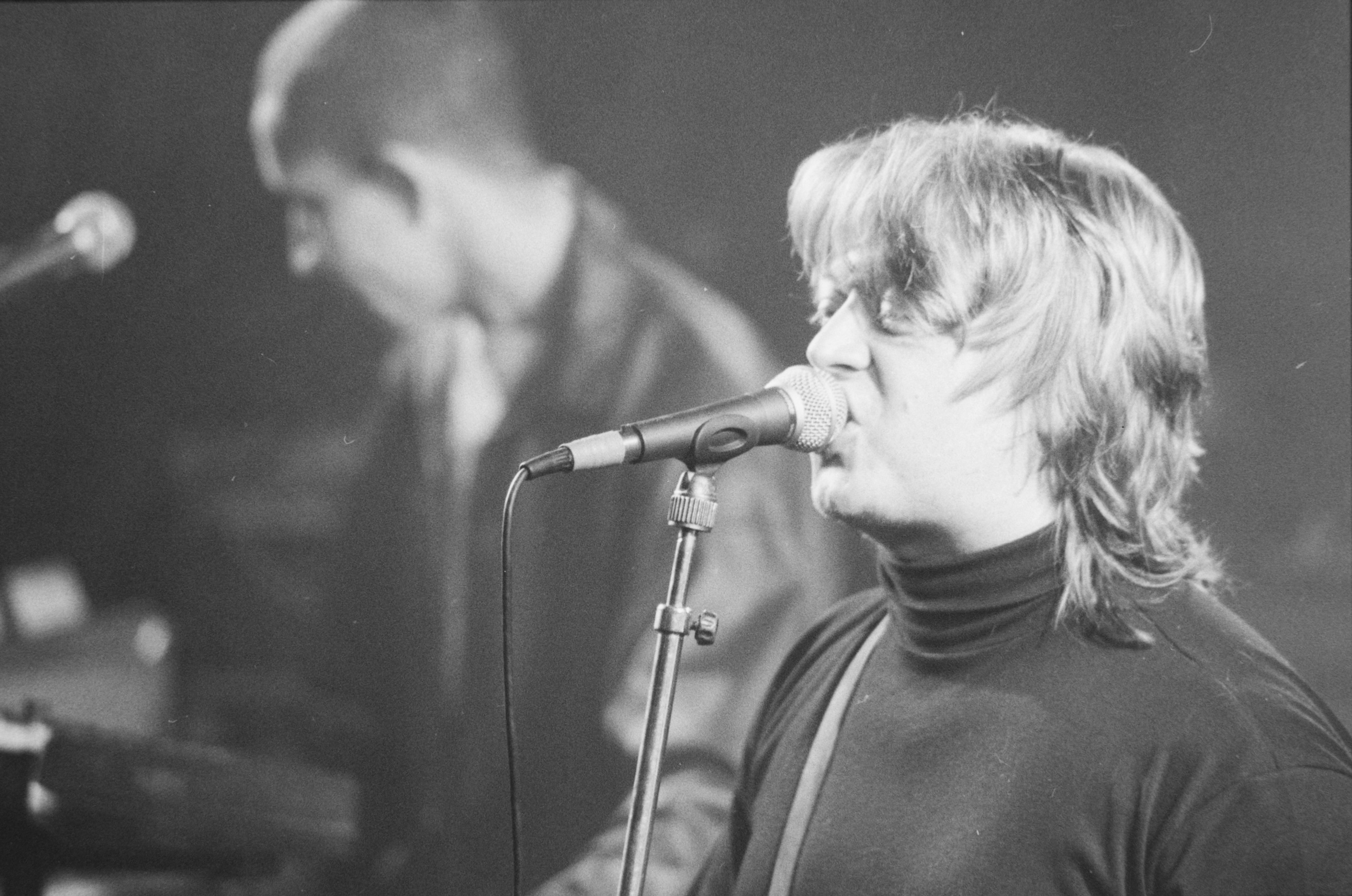
The Sound

Emerging from a hardcore punk background and inspired by the 1990s scene, particularly Brooklyn's, with Type O Negative as a major influence, Hangman's Chair would develop a slow-paced metal sound. They later incorporated influences from cold wave and UK post-punk, citing Asylum Party and the Sound, among others.

Coming from a hardcore punk background and having grown up listening to Bad Brains, Cro-Mags and Leeway, they gradually became interested in the slower sound of the 1990s scene, especially that of Brooklyn, which was "very doomy, very Black Sabbath inspired", with Life of Agony and Type O Negative. They appreciated the approach of Saint Vitus' members, who had themselves been influenced by Black Flag. They also appreciated the similar trajectory of Type O Negative, with Thépegnier particularly liking the way Carnivore—Peter Steele's previous band—sounded on the album Retaliation. Emerging from Es La Guerilla, the group of musicians who would form Hangman's Chair naturally gravitated towards a "really slow, sung, obscure" style of music. The members of Hangman's Chair cited Crowbar's Odd Fellows Rest as an early influence.

The band were influenced by Type O Negative. Kerrang! noted "a much more urban, gritty feel and atmosphere" in the band's music compared to what this type of "dark metal" generally presents. Thépegnier responded that the "urban mood and cold atmosphere" reflected in their music stems from their Parisian lifestyle. Daily events in Paris have influenced Hangman's Chair, and the city has also been a source of inspiration for them. Type O Negative were particularly inspiring, as their lyrics and album cover art conveyed the urban ambience of Brooklyn, combined with a "dark" gothic metal sound. Hangman's Chair initially drew inspiration from "old Paris", particularly from neighbourhoods like Barbès, Ménilmontant and Pigalle. However, 2018's Banlieue Triste focused on the suburbs where they grew up.

During the era of This Is Not Supposed To Be Positive (2015), they cited Alice in Chains as an influence. They also cited Eyehategod, Neglect, Only Living Witness, Section 8, Starkweather and Temple of the Dog as inspirations. "Our influences remain very broad", said Thépegnier, the band acknowledging that they listened to very little metal, but a lot of neofolk, such as Der Blutharsch and Blood Axis, as well as a lot of hip-hop. Olivier Drago of the print magazine New Noise wrote that the band incorporated cold wave and gothic rock influences into This Is Not Supposed To Be Positive.

Over time, they developed an affinity for 1980s bands, such as the Sound, who became their musical influences when creating 2022's A Loner. Their influences include 1980s post-punk, Asylum Party, Nothing, Sad Lovers & Giants, Slowdive, Soft Kill, the Cure, and Failure. Chanut was musically influenced by the Sound's From the Lions Mouth and its lyrics by Adrian Borland when composing A Loner. For the sound of his electric guitar on this album, he cited Slip by Quicksand and Brighter Than a Thousand Suns by Killing Joke for guitar effects. They produced "richer music" on A Loner by taking their original doom metal as a starting point and incorporating more varied influences, with David writing that it was "without ever falling into pastiche or clumsy citation". Thépegnier thought that the influences on the band's sound in general, and that on 2025's Saddiction, were probably a combination of their aggressive hardcore punk background and a strong interest in UK post-punk, as well as in cold wave and new wave, which produce "cold sounds and textures". A Loner and Saddiction were sonically influenced by post-punk and cold wave. Chanut and Toufouti also cited Chris Cornell and Dax Riggs as musical and artistic inspirations.

The group cited the works of authors such as Baudelaire, Camus, and Céline, as well as true crime stories and French magazines such as Le Nouveau Détective (lit. 'The New Detective') and L'Œil de la police (lit. 'The Eye of the Police') among their thematic influences. They also cited Apocalypse Culture as an influence.

They drew inspiration from period films, which led to the samples used in their music. The David Lynch-style ambiences and the film Dead Man also inspired their interludes. The French film score composer François de Roubaix was cited by the group as an important source of inspiration. In addition, documentaries such as Black Tar Heroin, Cut Up Kids, [Jon Alpert's] Dope Sick Love, Streetwise and Whores' Glory influenced them.

=== Sound ===
Hangman's Chair have generally been considered a doom metal, (Note: "doom metal", or "doom") stoner (doom or rock), (Note: "stoner", "stoner doom", or "stoner rock") sludge, gothic metal, (Note: "goth", "goth metal", or "Gothic") progressive [metal], and cold wave band.

In 2018, Rich Hobson of Metal Hammer wrote: "Hangman's Chair are masters of utilising a blend of doom metal riffs and moody post-punk atmospherics". In 2022, Rich Webb of Distorted Sound Magazine noted their "shoegaze/doom metal hybrid" writing style on their albums. That same year, Angela Davey and Nick Ruskell of Kerrang! wrote that the band blends "gothic rock and epic doom metal". Also in 2022, Hobson echoed this statement, describing their music as "80s-tinged goth-doom". In 2023, the newspaper L'Alsace described the band's sound as a "melancholic doom tinged with cold wave". In 2025, David characterised the band as "navigating between doom metal and alternative rock". Journalist Pierre-Antoine Riquart wrote in 2025 that their "doom/sludge" blends with "the coldness of cold wave". "Doom, sludge, post-hardcore, it all blends together in a heavy, clammy, sticky sound", wrote Rock Sound France in 2025, also providing a general description.

Toufouti stated in 2025 that the band did not like tags, though they appreciated the term "cold doom" to describe their music. (Note: Olivier Ducruix from the French print magazine Guitar Part described A Loner as "cold-doom" in his review of the album published on 6 February 2022.)

==== Development ====
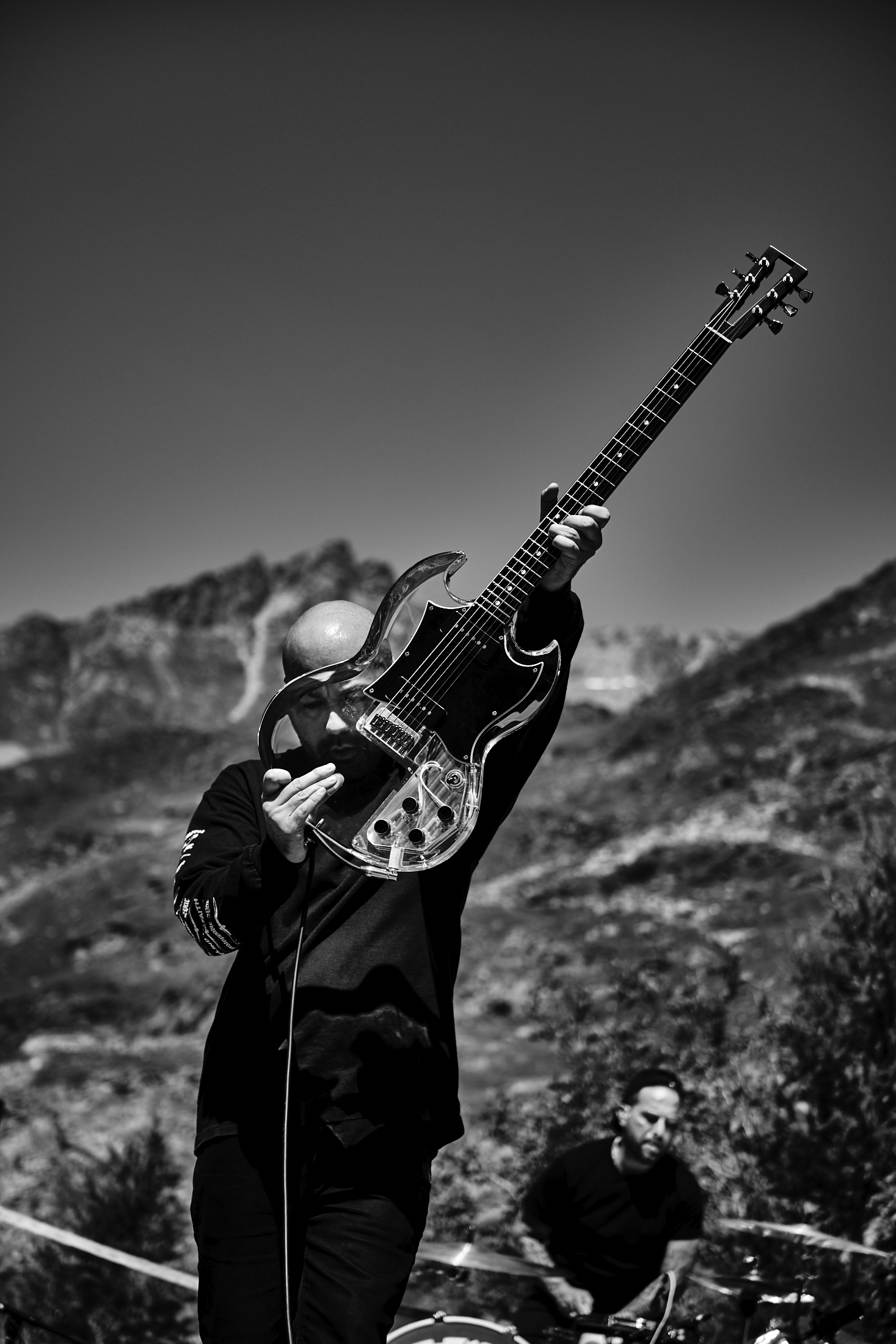
Chanut (left) and Thépegnier (right) performing at Palp Festival 2021 in the Val de Bagnes, Switzerland

Chanut told Lemaire: "Our first two albums were a bit of tests. We were very Sludge, very Stoner, with influences not well digested yet". Drago said that 2012's Hope /// Dope /// Rope marked a slight sonic evolution. Drago further said that before This Is Not Supposed To Be Positive, their metal had been "hitherto placed under doom/stoner/sludge perfusion". This Is Not Supposed to Be Positive introduced gothic melodies and cold wave-style synthesiser sounds that became a main sonic layer. Synthesiser sounds are also derived from guitar effects. In his review of This Is Not Supposed To Be Positive, Patrick Schmidt of Rock Hard stated that the quartet primarily belonged to the "doom/sludge scene". Banlieue Triste is characterised by profuse use of reverb and chorus effects. Hangman's Chair have been described as a "French doom rock band" or as sludge in its early days or "stoner", which led Thépegnier to acknowledge that being categorised within the doom scene did not bother the band members because their instruments are tuned "very low" and they play at slow tempos. "We sounded Sludge in our beginning", he said, adding, "I think we moved away from that pretty quickly". Thépegnier refuted any association with the "stoner" genre, further saying, "We are very far from Stoner, both in terms of imagery and the 'psychedelic rock' side".

A Loner marked the group's sixth collaboration with Francis Caste, a French record producer and sound engineer, at his own studio, Studio Sainte-Marthe, located in the 10th arrondissement of Paris. During the recording of A Loner, Chanut used an old Marshall JMP head to add more upper mids, giving the sound a more defined character. To get a "really fat sound" in the studio, he used his first-generation Rivera electric guitar amplifier. For the electric guitar parts, the band wanted a "bright sound" with less gain and "to remove this flattering aspect" of the sub-bass characteristic of doom or sludge metal. To "let the music breathe more" and to highlight the guitar effects, particularly the reverbs, Thépegnier decided to "lighten" his drumming. Thépegnier further stated that they wanted to "lighten" their sound and achieve this "bright" result that would enable them to embrace "our cold ambiences even more. Getting out of our 'doomy' comfort zone". Journalist Jean-Charles Desgroux wrote that the band "dares to experiment" on A Loner and "beyond doom, sludge or at worst that muddy stoner which they will never claim". David wrote in his review of A Loner: "The French group experiments, plays with effects, textures and nuances".

At this stage of the band's evolution, their music has been characterised by greater melodicism and introspection, and at times becoming "quasi-atmospheric". While Hangman's Chair blended various doom sounds to create an atmosphere on This Is Not Supposed To Be Positive, they sounded, on A Loner, like a different band from their earlier work, with gothic sounds closer to goth rock and cold wave than metal at this stage. The "stoner band" they had been in the past had nevertheless left some "artefacts" in their music. A Loner features moments leaning towards shoegaze, others more towards goth rock, and some heavier passages, the melodies primarily serving "to sustain the gloom". Olivier Ducruix of Guitar Part stated that Hangman's Chair "have gone even further" with A Loner, "as if to free yourselves a little more from the stoner/sludge/doom tags that have stuck to the band's skin since their beginnings". The album's sound contains "fuzz" guitar effects and is "Somewhere between Type O Negative and the Cure", said Ducruix. Thus, since March 2022, Hangman's Chair have been described as embracing a "gothic doom" sound, and having evolved into a goth band, an identity cemented by the release of A Loner.

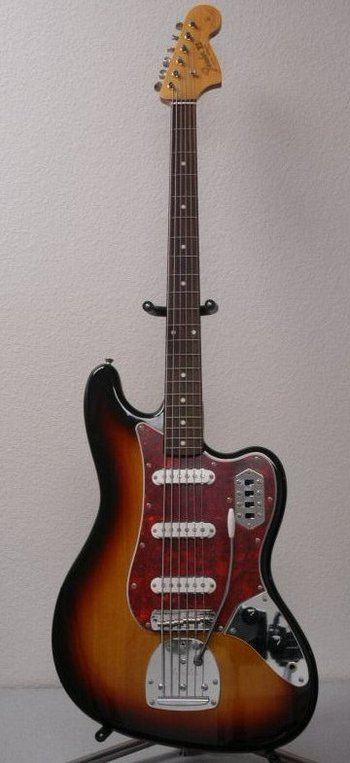
Chanut used a Fender Bass VI (pictured) to record Saddiction (2025)

Their 2023 song "Spleenwise" continued "the grand tradition of gothically inclined doom bands" initiated by My Dying Bride, Paradise Lost, and Type O Negative. Its composition, featuring "strong 80s overtones", unfolds at the "glacial pace" of Hangman's Chair, with stylistic echoes of the Sisters of Mercy and Tears for Fears. That same year, Metal Hammer's Matt Mills wrote that the band established themselves by "layering goth melodies atop a bedrock of lead-heavy doom".

The guitar amplifier head that Chanut had used on previous albums had been stolen. Nostalgic for the sound they used to have, and having begun playing guitar with Azzouni using an old preamplifier, Chanut decided to purchase one. However, Chanut employed Azzouni's preamp on Saddiction, as Caste had since purchased it. For the recording of Saddiction, Chanut used a Bass VI, an instrument that is a cross between an electric guitar and an electric bass. The group described themselves as being engaged in "constant sound research". "Post-punk is almost perfect ... It just needs bigger riffs", the band members said; this was the guiding principle when creating the album, noted Mills. Michel Valentin of Le Parisien wrote that Saddiction has "roots still metal but with numerous more atmospheric, gothic, even 'cold wave' passages". On Saddiction, the band continued in the same sonic direction as on A Loner, with Toufouti mentioning experiments with chorus effects and clean tones. In 2025, Mills drew a parallel between their melodies and those of the Sisters of Mercy, but with guitar distortion and drums' "fierceness" turned up in Hangman's Chair.

=== Songwriting process ===
In charge of the basic structure of the songs, Chanut or Thépegnier would then present them in rehearsal, where the other band members would develop them through a "more organic" process.

Toufouti usually writes the lyrics after receiving the instrumentals. Chanut said in 2015 that he "validates his lyrics so that they totally align with the band's concept". Toufouti writes his lyrics in English for convenience. According to him, it would be more difficult in French, because of the risk of falling into excess and clichés. Furthermore, according to Chanut, the inherent fluidity of English suits metal music better, whereas certain French consonants are more abrupt. He added that most of the bands they listen to sing in English. Conversely, Hangman's Chair enjoys using French album or song titles for their sonority.

Chanut and Thépegnier had to adapt to periods of lockdown while the rehearsal space remained closed for more than a year. They were both able to exchange ideas because Thépegnier had his home studio under construction and Chanut had his own audio workstation. They were also able to rehearse remotely without audio latency thanks to the beta version of the NuCorder software, designed by Caste. The drum patterns that would later appear on A Loner were influenced by Thépegnier's use of an electronic drum kit during these remote songwriting sessions. From the album A Loner onwards, Chanut felt the need to write lyrics, even though the roles assigned to composing the "skeletons" of the songs remained the same. He began writing lyrics to his own instrumentals while Toufouti wrote to Thépegnier's.

Thépegnier was no longer in the Île-de-France region when Saddiction was composed, so he and Chanut had to develop demos separately. The tracks were then finalised by Toufouti and Hanvic, who contributed their ideas and arrangements.

=== Lyrics and themes ===
They tackle subjects from a cynical and nihilistic angle, such as alcohol abuse, drug use and suicidal thoughts, and have done so since their first album. The band have been known for tackling subjects on alienation, mental illness, night, prostitution, suburbia, "unhappy loves", loneliness, addiction, suicide, and death. They have addressed topics they have directly observed, as well as others drawn from concrete reality or the experiences of those close to them. The lyrics deal predominantly with personal subjects, as Toufouti has not been inclined to "talk about things that are a little too made up". They preferred to stick to topics they knew well, as they considered this approach enabled them to remain "authentic".

To assert their "own identity" through their place of origin, namely Paris, the group incorporated "typical French references" as well as artwork featuring the Apaches, who were gangs of violent Parisian thugs from the 20th-century criminal underworld. The cover artwork of This Is Not Supposed To Be Positive depicts French executioner Anatole Deibler. The song title in French, "Le rouge pour le sang, le bleu pour la grâce" (lit. 'Red for Blood, Blue for Grace'), refers to the colour codes used by Deibler in his notebook, which listed the names of those condemned to the guillotine with a red cross circled in black and those pardoned with a blue cross. The French title of the instrumental song, "Les enfants des monstres pleurent leur désespoir" (lit. 'The Monsters' Children Weep Their Despair'), appearing on that album, originates from a documentary about [Gérard] Depardieu and his son's death.

On Banlieue Triste, Hangman's Chair addressed the same thematic elements but less metaphorically, taking a more straightforward approach. Some of Banlieue Triste's topics were addressed for the first time by the group, ultimately reflecting "real parts" of their lives and closely associated with a "very personal" album artwork featuring hidden references. During the Banlieue Triste era, they began to delve deeper into introspection and focus on themes fuelled by personal issues. The lyrics directly address topics such as the near-disappearance of a band member following an overdose in 2016, recounted in the song "04/09/16"; the loss of family in "Negative Male Child"; and mental health and its associated difficulties in "Touch the Razor". The instrumental "Sidi Bel Abbes" pays tribute to Azzouni. The band's album artwork and music videos invariably referenced Azzouni. Kerrang! described Banlieue Triste as an album that displays "a darkness that comes not from the wilderness that so often makes up doom, but a more gritty, claustrophobic urban setting".

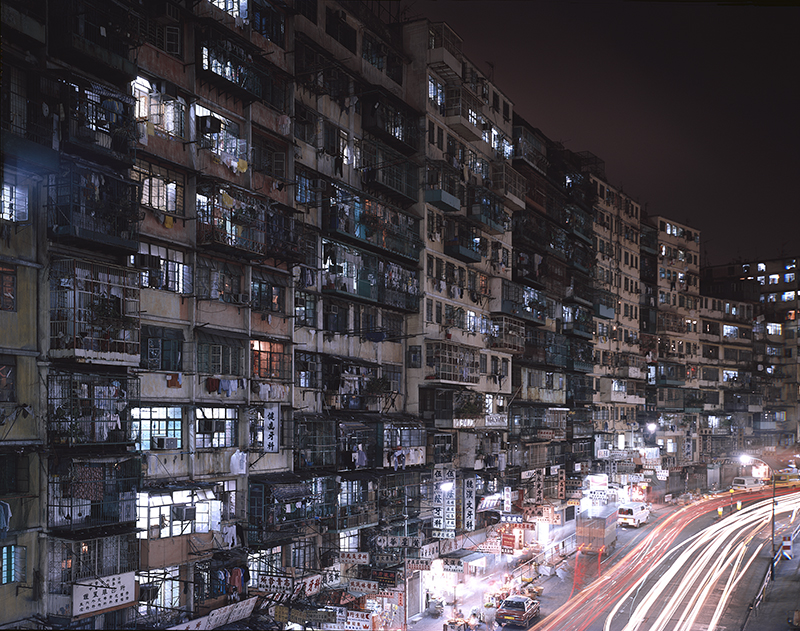
The edge of Kowloon Walled City in 1993

In his analysis, Desgroux considered that the band's themes were rooted on either side of the boulevard périphérique (ring road) of Paris. On one side, he described Paris, with its "mysteries", "legends", stories and "myths"; on the other, the suburb, with its violence, "crude reality", boredom and "ugly and sad aesthetic". The subjects the band tackles fall within that context. The band's sound materialises from a foundation of "gritty, homespun negativity". A Loner addresses the themes of depression and the need for isolation, as Chanut was affected by these issues during the lockdown period, which coincided with the album's writing. "A Thousand Miles Away", the album's last song, marked the onset of Chanut's depression; he wrote the lyrics about his father's death. David stated that A Loner's musical approach and themes addressed are "purely personal" and that the lyrics "evoke despair without making it an end in itself." "Dark, brooding and unapologetically downbeat on record", wrote Kerrang!'s Sam Law.

In 2025, Toufouti stated that he found it interesting to elaborate on a sad individual or subject, as he felt there was material to develop. Saddiction continued in the vein of A Loner by being "more personal, more introspective", said Chanut. Before entering the studio, Toufouti slightly reworked the lyrics of "Neglect" to evoke his relationship with his father, who had just passed away. "Kowloon Lights" refers to the former densely populated enclave within the Hong Kong colony. Chanut described the grey buildings that made up the city and its colourful neon lights, often depicted in many Hong Kong films of the 1980s.

=== Vocals ===
Toufouti did not consider himself a singer when recording 2010's Leaving Paris. At that time, he was mainly inspired by voices he described as "a bit broken, a bit gravelly" over stoner and bluesy riffs, mentioning the band Down. On Hope /// Dope /// Rope, his bandmates encouraged him to abandon that vocal style and sing, telling him, "think crooner", which led him to learn to "desaturate" his voice. Toufouti felt that his voice retained a certain harshness on this album, though it was "clearer". On subsequent albums, he continued the improvements he had begun to reduce saturation as much as possible. Schmidt praised the "high, clear and immensely rousing singing" on This Is Not Supposed To Be Positive. Chloe Leonard of Distorted Sound Magazine described "Naive" as "a sludge infused track that really showcases frontman Cédric Toufouti's impressive vocal range".

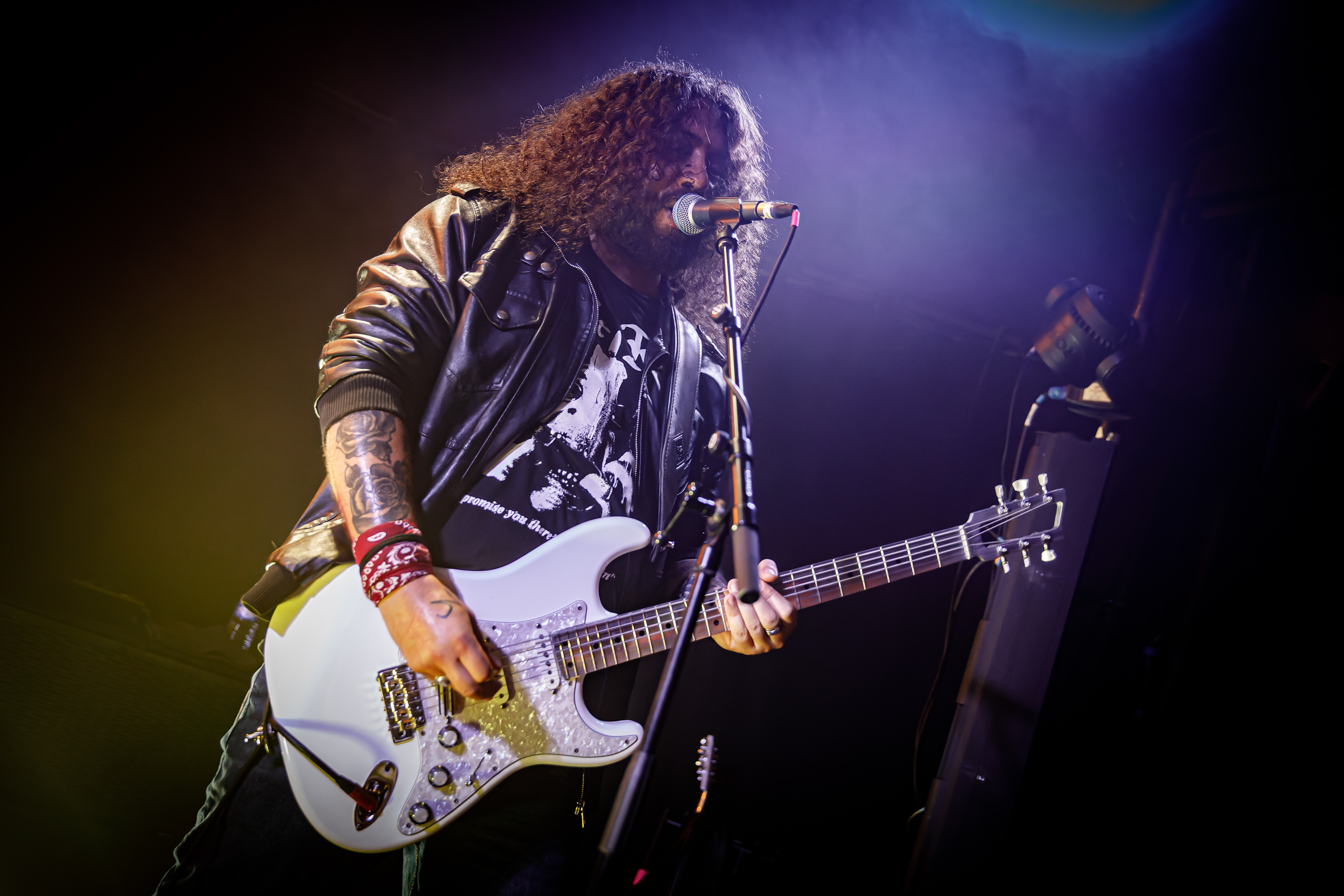
Toufouti performing at Le Trabendo in Paris, October 2022

Regarding A Loner, Toufouti and Igorrr's female lyrical vocalist spent some time together so she could teach him vocal techniques. In 2022, Desgroux described Toufouti's voice as "clear and ultra-melodic". David wrote that his singing on A Loner expresses "sadness without being tearful and loneliness without calling pity". A staff reviewer at Metal Storm felt that A Loner's "grunge-like" vocals are slightly too pronounced for that sound, though this does not hinder immersion; on the contrary, the ensuing contrast makes "the album more interesting". Webb said that the bassline coupled with the guitar tones on "An Ode To Breakdown" provides "the perfect platform" for Toufouti "to lay his beautiful, soulful singing over". In their review of Hangman's Chair's concert at DesertFest 2022 in the UK, Davey and Ruskell wrote that the band's music "culminate[s] in soaring riffs which serve to bolster the raw emotion of Cédric Toufouti's cleanly sung vocals".

On Saddiction, Toufouti had to change his guitar tuning to match the Bass VI's sound and, consequently, adapt his vocal style. Thus, he went up into a higher pitch range more often and for longer durations, adding extra "tension" to certain riffs, he said. He added that exploring a different vocal palette enabled him to maintain a constant "tension" throughout a song, whereas previously he had alternated between a more relaxed singing style and some "tense" sporadic passages. Reviewing Saddiction for Metal Hammer, Chris Chantler wrote: "The open-hearted melodic vocal harmonies have much improved, proving higher in pitch and more expressive than most goth crooners." Toufouti's vocals on Saddiction have been compared to those of Phil Collins. Ronny Bittner of Rock Hard adds that his "soulful singing" brings "some warmth" to the album's overall sound, "through skilful harmonic shifts".

=== Film samples ===
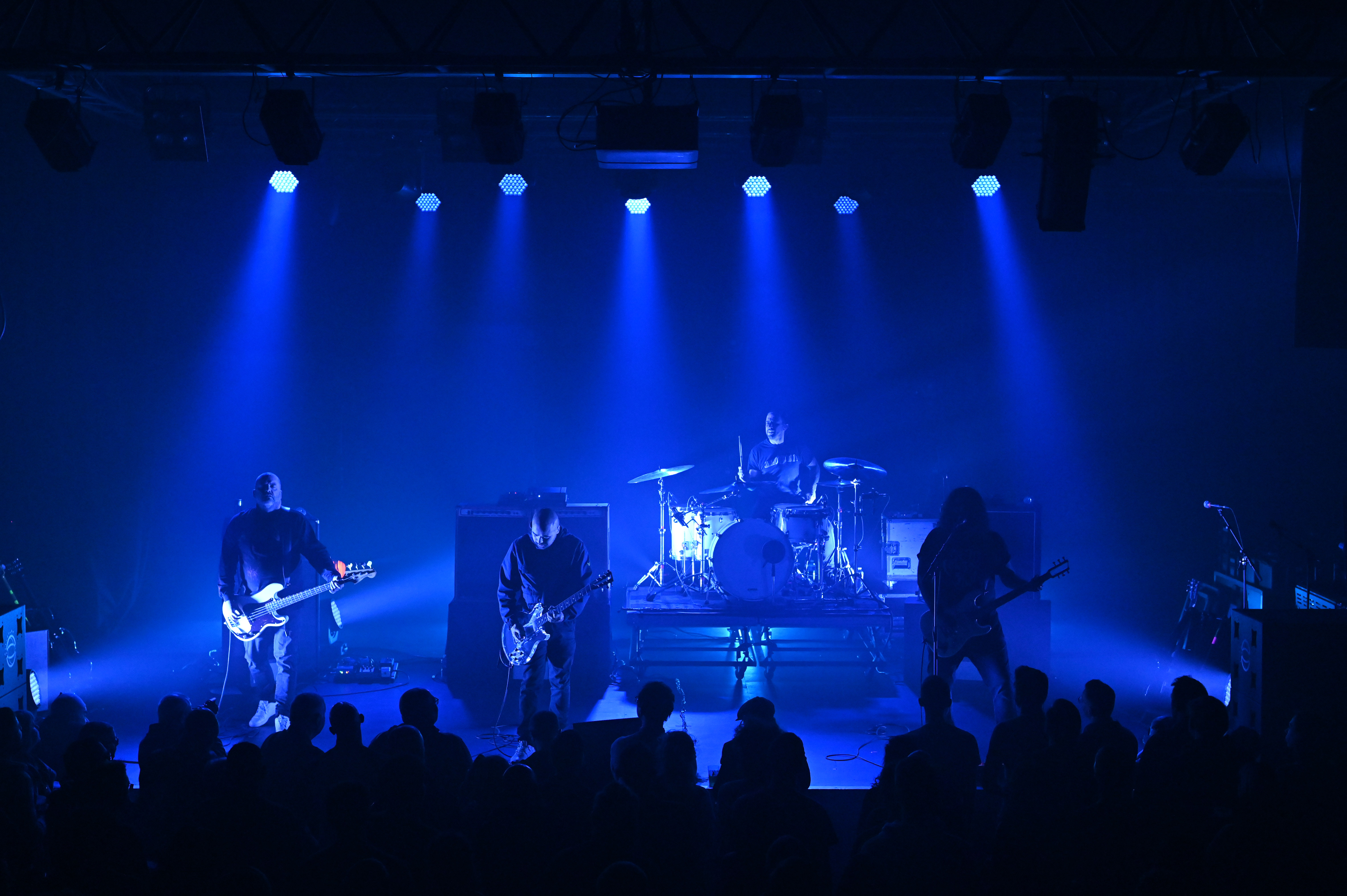
Film vocal samples have been incorporated into the albums and played at the end of the concerts

An audio sample taken from The Picture of Dorian Gray was included on the first album. A sample featured on Leaving Paris came from a Belgian documentary titled Allô Police. A sequence from the film The Night of the Hunter, featuring children singing, served as the opening track for the album Hope /// Dope /// Rope. The album's instrumental closing track contains a speech by Joe Coleman on Ebola, crimes, and other topics.

They incorporated French language samples into their own music. A sample from a Belgian news report in which a person discussed their tattoos appears on This Is Not Supposed To Be Positive. The last song of This Is Not Supposed To Be Positive sampled a passage from the 1969 film Paris interdit (lit. 'Paris Forbidden'), with the band stating in December 2015 that "it takes on full meaning" following the events in Paris. During the recording of This Is Not Supposed To Be Positive, Hangman's Chair wanted to sample a passage from Patrick Deval's film Acéphale, in which a character recites the text of La conjuration sacrée (lit. 'The Sacred Conjuration'), taken from the first issue of Georges Bataille's periodical Acéphale (1936). However, the band kept it as a concert outro and later used it in "Full Ashtray", the closing song on Banlieue Triste. They also sampled a passage from Story of a Junkie.

== Band members ==
The lineup listings are adapted from the Hard Force website, originally a print magazine published from 1986 to 2000.

Final lineup

- Cédric Toufouti – lead vocals, guitar (2008–2025)
- Julien Rour Chanut – guitar (2005–2025)
- Clément Hanvic – bass (2008–2025)
- Mehdi Birouk Thépegnier – drums (2005–2025)

Former members

- Sid-Ahmed Azzouni – guitar (2005–2009; died 2010)
- Kéo Nackphouminh – lead vocals (2005–2008)
- Adrien Lederer – guitar (n/a–2010)
- Bernard Quarante – bass (2005–2008)

Touring musicians

- Christophe Marconato – bass (2011)

== Discography ==
Studio albums

- (A Lament for...) The Addicts (2007)
- Leaving Paris (2010)
- Hope /// Dope /// Rope (2012)
- This Is Not Supposed To Be Positive (2015)
- Banlieue Triste (2018)
- A Loner (2022)
- Saddiction (2025)

EPs

- Bus de Nuit (2019)

Split albums

- Hangman's Chair / Eibon (2007)
- Hangman's Chair / Drawers (2012)
- Hangman's Chair / Acid Deathtrip (2014)
- Hangman's Chair / Greenmachine (2017)
