= David Penn =

David Penn may refer to:

- David Penn (magician) (fl. 1990s), corporate English magician from Northampton
- David Penn (DJ) (fl. 2000s–2020s), Spanish DJ, producer and remixer
