= Ninja Express =

- Created by: Kim Claeys
- Directed by: Kim Claeys; François Reczulski
- Voices of: Beth Chalmers; David Coburn
- Composers: Gregory Caron; Hannes de Maeyer
- Countries of origin: Belgium; France; United Kingdom
- Original languages: English; Flemish; French
- No. of seasons: 1
- No. of episodes: 52

Production
- Executive producers: Luc Van Driessche; Olivier Dumont; Peter Decraene
- Producers: Jean-Pierre Quenet; Stanislas Renaudeau d'Arc; Laura Ghyselinck
- Running time: 11 minutes
- Production companies: Entertainment One (2021–2023); Hasbro Entertainment (2023–present); Frog Box; Creative Conspiracy

Original release
- Network: Ketnet (Flanders); Gulli (France); CBBC (UK); Boomerang (Asia)
- Release: July 1, 2021 – 2022

Ninja Express is an animated television series for children aged 6–9, created by Kim Claeys and the company Creative Conspiracy, from Ghent; so far, one season of 52 episodes of each 11 minutes has been aired. The series has been bought by TV channels in 192 countries. It is among the most watched series on British children's channel CBBC. The cost of €12 million to create the first season was carried for 50% by Flemish companies and the Flemish Government and for 50% by international partners Entertainment One and WarnerMedia (now Warner Bros. Discovery).

The series is about a delivery service run by three ninjas, Aka, Kiro and Konpeki, who have super powers. The show is produced by Hasbro Entertainment (formerly produced by Entertainment One), Frog Box and Creative Conspiracy.

Ninja Express is shown on CBBC in the UK; Gulli in France; Ketnet in Flanders; and on many international versions of Boomerang (e.g. in Poland, Romania, Germany, Bulgaria France and Italy).

== Voice Cast ==
=== English ===
- Beth Chalmers
- David Coburn
- additional voices
  - Akiya Henry
  - Alex Jordan
  - Andrew West
  - Eric Meyers
  - Rae Lim
  - Keith Wickham
  - Ayesha Antoine
  - Josie Taylor
  - David Menkin
  - Claire Morgan
  - Penelope Rawlins
  - James Phoon
  - Jane Whittenshaw
  - Shash Hira
  - Andrew James Spooner
  - Ako Mitchell
  - Rasmus Hardiker
  - Marcel Mc Malla
  - Zehra Jane Naqvi
  - Pedro Gardiner
  - T'Shaw Williams
  - John Tillotson

Voice directors: David Peacock, Andrew West and Adam Long

Voice recording: Coda Post Production and Audi'Art Dub

== Episodes ==
No.	Title	Written by	Original release date
1	"Viking Beats"	Kim Claeys	July 3, 2021
2	"Wooden Horse"	Ciaran Murtagh; Andrew Barnett Jones	July 8, 2021
3	"The Ultimate Sword Remover"	Kim Claeys	July 5, 2021
4	"Damsel in Distress"	Kim Claeys	July 5, 2021
5	"A Flag"	Kim Claeys; Ciaran Murtagh; Andrew Barnett Jones	TBA
6	"What a Drag"	Tobi Wilson; Ciaran Murtagh; Andrew Barnett Jones	TBA
7	"Deliving Daylights"	Alex Collier	TBA
8	"A Brick"	Ciaran Murtagh; Andrew Barnett Jones	TBA
9	"Soup"	Kim Claeys; Ciaran Murtagh; Andrew Barnett Jones	TBA
10	"Awesome Cleaning Robot"	Evgenia Golubeva	July 3, 2021
11	"A Carriage"	Ciaran Murtagh; Andrew Barnett Jones	July 7, 2021
12	"Ninja Cleaners"	Alex Collier	July 8, 2021
13	"Treasure Hunting"	Kim Claeys; Ciaran Murtagh; Andrew Barnett Jones	TBA
14	"Temple of Wishes"	Kim Claeys; Ciaran Murtagh; Andrew Barnett Jones	TBA
15	"Hats Off to the Ninjas"	Tim Bain	TBA
16	"Mad for Mariachi"	Ciaran Murtagh; Andrew Barnett Jones	TBA
17	"A Magic Wand"	Tim Bain	July 6, 2021
18	"Straight from the Horse's Mouth"	Chris Chantler; Howard Read	TBA
19	"An Epic Wave"	Myles McLeod	July 14, 2021
20	"A Mammoth Wedding"	Howard Read	July 9, 2021
21	"Fire"	Kim Claeys; Ciaran Murtagh; Andrew Barnett Jones	TBA
22	"Egg"	Myles McLeod	August 22, 2021
23	"By the Seaside"	Ciaran Murtagh; Andrew Barnett Jones	TBA
24	"Villain"	Kim Claeys; Ciaran Murtagh; Andrew Barnett Jones	TBA
25	"Figurine"	Tim Brian	February 14, 2022
26	"Highland Fling"	Ciaran Murtagh; Andrew Barnett Jones	TBA
27	"Mega Hero Girl"	Becky Overton	TBA
28	"Making Music"	Adam Long	TBA
29	"The Balloon"	Cédric Chauveau; Ciaran Murtagh; François Reczulski	TBA
30	"Cuckoo Car"	Alex Collier	TBA
31	"The Nanny"	Ciaran Murtagh; Cédric Chauveau; François Reczulski	TBA
32	"Giant Trousers"	Ciaran Murtagh; François Reczulski	TBA
33	"Operation Potato"	Cédric Chauveau; Ciaran Murtagh; François Reczulski	TBA
34	"Gnome Sweet Gnome"	Ciaran Murtagh; François Reczulski	TBA
35	"Monster Shield"	Ciaran Murtagh; François Reczulski	TBA
36	"Ninja Detective"	Ciaran Murtagh; François Reczulski	TBA
37	"Canned"	TBA	TBA
38	"Ninja Pong"	TBA	TBA
39	"The Pre-Hysteric Race"	TBA	TBA
40	"Beatbox"	Ciaran Murtagh; François Reczulski	TBA
41	"Home Orc"	Ciaran Murtagh; François Reczulski	TBA
42	"A New Rug"	TBA	TBA
43	"Trainee Witch"	Ciaran Murtagh; François Reczulski	TBA
44	"Ninja Against Ninja"	Ciaran Murtagh; François Reczulski	TBA
45	"Peaceful Planet"	Ciaran Murtagh; François Reczulski	TBA
46	"Powerless"	Ciaran Murtagh; François Reczulski	TBA
47	"Magic Tournament"	TBA	TBA
48	"Temper Tantrums"	TBA	TBA
49	"Mega Feline"	Ciaran Murtagh	TBA
50	"The Toymaker"	Ciaran Murtagh	TBA
51	"Sweet Smell of Success"	Ciaran Murtagh	TBA
52	"Three Wishes"	Ciaran Murtagh	TBA
