= Little Howard's Big Question =

- Genre: Edutainment
- Created by: Howard Read
- Written by: Howard Read; Chris Chantler
- Directed by: Bruce Webb; Dermot Canterbury
- Starring: Howard Read
- Voices of: Howard Read
- Opening theme: "I Love Monkeys"
- Composer: Chris Banks
- Country of origin: United Kingdom
- Original language: English
- No. of series: 3
- No. of episodes: 39

Production
- Executive producer: Pete Davies Vanessa Frances-Georgianna Series Producer
- Editors: Anuree De Silva, Scott Flyger, Miland Suman, Lee Bamsey, Alex Hare at Locomotion
- Camera setup: Lee York
- Running time: 23 minutes

Original release
- Network: BBC One; BBC Two; CBBC
- Release: 8 January 2009 – 17 August 2011

Little Howard's Big Question (2009–11) is a British children's edutainment programme starring Howard Read as Big Howard and his six-year-old animated friend, Little Howard. The programme was first broadcast on 8 January 2009, running for a series of 13 episodes. Series 2 began airing on 6 October 2010, and series 3 began on 18 May 2011 on CBBC.

== Format ==
Animated boy Little Howard and his live-action guardian Big Howard live together in Purley, London. Each episode typically begins with a short comedy sketch, which inspires Little Howard to blow a loud animated klaxon and ask a "big question" on a related topic. After a credit sequence involving an animated monkey song-and-dance routine, the remainder of the programme investigates possible answers to the big question, using a combination of research, expert advice, fantasy, and song.

Further assistance is provided by Mother, a pink (series 1) or orange (series 2/3) anthropomorphic personal computer that wears clothes and feels emotions.

Although the programme is broadcast on the BBC, which does not show commercial advertising, each episode features a comedy "advertising break" with imaginary products vaguely related to the big question. Similarly, a frequent element throughout the series is the use of humorous pop culture references to appeal to an adult audience, and which would fly over younger viewers' heads.

== Awards ==
On 16 November 2011, the episode Why do Things Have to Die? from series 2 won a Writers' Guild of Great Britain award for Best Children's Television Script.

== List of episodes ==
=== Series 1 ===
Series 1 began airing on 8 January 2009. Performers who appeared in series 1 included: Kirsten O'Brien, Lucy Porter, Justin Edwards, Ishia Bennison, and David Penn.

| # | Little Howard's Big Question | Original air date |
|---|---|---|
| 1 | Why Do I Need to Go to Sleep? | 8 January 2009 |
| 2 | Why Can't I Fly? | 15 January 2009 |
| 3 | How Did I Get Here? | 22 January 2009 |
| 4 | Can I Get Big Howard Abducted by Aliens? | 29 January 2009 |
| 5 | How Will I Know When I'm in Love? | 5 February 2009 |
| 6 | How Can I be Lucky? | 12 February 2009 |
| 7 | Could Dinosaurs Ever Come Back? | 19 February 2009 |
| 8 | Why Does Time Fly When You're Having Fun? | 26 February 2009 |
| 9 | What is Funny? | 5 March 2009 |
| 10 | What the Gibbing Flump Are You on About Doris? | 12 March 2009 |
| 11 | What is the World's Most Dangerous Food? | 19 March 2009 |
| 12 | Can I Believe My Eyes? | 26 March 2009 |
| 13 | Little Howard's DVD Extras (Clips episode, premiered on CBBC following episode 12) | 26 March 2009 |

=== Series 2 ===
Series 2 began airing on 6 October 2010. The first two episodes were shown on BBC Two (because the 2010 Commonwealth Games were being aired on BBC One), and the rest of the series on BBC One. The series introduced many new characters, real and cartoon, including Little Howards "Sort-of half-brother, kind-of" Little Albert. Actors who appeared in series 2 included David Schneider, Sy Thomas, Lucy Porter, Siân Lloyd, Jarred Christmas, Tim Brooke-Taylor, Marek Larwood, Barney Harwood, and Andre Vincent. Helen Lederer featured in more than one episode as Big Howard's Mum.

| # | Little Howard's Big Question | Original air date |
|---|---|---|
| 1 | Why Can't I Get Hold of Sawblaind the Municipal? | 6 October 2010 |
| 2 | How Can I Make a Monster? | 13 October 2010 |
| 3 | How Can I Learn Superpowers? | 20 October 2010 |
| 4 | Is There Anything Smellier Than Big Howard? | 27 October 2010 |
| 5 | How Can I Make Big Howard Famous? | 3 November 2010 |
| 6 | Who's Been Eating My Porridge? | 10 November 2010 |
| 7 | Why Can't I Be You? | 17 November 2010 |
| 8 | Can I Wrestle Control of the Weather from Sian Lloyd's Evil Grip? | 24 November 2010 |
| 9 | Can I Dig to Australia? | 1 December 2010 |
| 10 | Why Do Things Have to Die? | 8 December 2010 |
| 11 | Can Father Christmas Star in Our Nativity Play? | 15 December 2010 |
| 12 | Can Big Howard Live Without His Mobile Phone? | 5 January 2011 |
| 13 | The Best of Little Howard's Big Questions | 12 January 2011 |

=== Series 3 ===
Series 3 began airing on 18 May 2011. Actors who appeared in series 3 included: Rusty Goffe, Ben Moor, Daniel Hill, Chris Cox, Doc Brown, Trevor Neal, and Thomas Nelstrop.

| # | Little Howard's Big Question | Original air date |
|---|---|---|
| 1 | Why Can't I Be Bigger? | 18 May 2011 |
| 2 | How Can I Be in Two Places at Once? | 25 May 2011 |
| 3 | Can I Catch a Mermaid? | 1 June 2011 |
| 4 | How Can I Change Someone's Mind? | 8 June 2011 |
| 5 | Why Am I Afraid? | 15 June 2011 |
| 6 | Am I Normal? | 22 June 2011 |
| 7 | Can I Read Big Howard's Mind? | 29 June 2011 |
| 8 | Why Can't I Be in Charge? | 13 July 2011 |
| 9 | Am I Art? | 20 July 2011 |
| 10 | Where Is Big Howard? | 27 July 2011 |
| 11 | Can I Sing for a Whole Episode? | 3 August 2011 |
| 12 | Why Do I Have To Share? | 10 August 2011 |
| 13 | The Little Howard's Big Question Awards | 17 August 2011 |
