= Peacefully in Their Sleeps =

- Genre: Comedy
- Running time: 15 mins
- Country of origin: United Kingdom
- Language: English
- Home station: BBC Radio 4
- Starring: Geoff McGivern
- Written by: Chris Chantler and Howard Read
- Produced by: Colin Anderson
- Original release: 8 August – 12 September 2007
- No. of series: 1
- No. of episodes: 6
- Website: Website at BBC Radio 4

Peacefully in Their Sleeps is a BBC Radio 4 comedy series written by Chris Chantler and Howard Read. Paying tribute to fictional celebrities, it lampoons postwar popular culture using fake archive footage and interviews. Six episodes were produced, and aired from July until September 2007.

Each episode memorialises a different fictional celebrity, with guest stars including Marcus Brigstocke, Elizabeth Spriggs, Richard Briers, Jeffrey Holland, Paul Putner, Phyllida Law and Dan Antopolski. Geoff McGivern plays the programme's presenter Roydon Postlethwaite.

== Episodes ==
1. Episode 1: Rene Fortesque-Spencer-French
2. Episode 2: Sir Matthias Blaggard
3. Episode 3: Jeff Peacock
4. Episode 4: Douggie "The Shins" Wild
5. Episode 5: Dame Penelope Sway
6. Episode 6: Sister Cecilia of Caracas
