= Chris Chantler (writer) =

British comedy writer and musician

Chris Chantler is a British comedy writer, occasional performer, and doom metal musician. His work includes An A-Z of The British Countryside (BBC 7), Peacefully in Their Sleeps (Radio 4), Two Posh Old Men (UKTV), The Milk Run (BBC Radio 1), and Stairlift To Heaven in the Children's BBC comedy showcase slot Gina's Laughing Gear. He also provided material for three of Howard Read's Edinburgh Festival shows.

Chris has recently had success as co-writer and occasional actor in the 13 episodes of Little Howard's Big Question, which aired on Children's BBC January 2009 through March 2009.

He wrote for Terrorizer and also played drums in the now-defunct extreme doom band Moss. In 2015, he was assigned to write some of the Danger Mouse episodes with Howard Read.
