= Wizard Product Review =

Fortnightly magic review show started in 2010

The Wizard Product Review is a fortnightly magic review show started by World Magic Shop in May 2010. It featured guests such as magician Paul Daniels. The show brings in a weekly audience of around 10,000 viewers; mostly magicians.

== Hosts ==
The show was originally hosted by David Penn and Craig Petty until 2015 when Craig was replaced by Sean Heydon who continued to host the show until replaced by Wayne Fox who continues to host the show with Penn.
