= Howard Read =

British screenwriter, comedian, and animator

Howard Oliver Drinkwater Read is a British screenwriter, comedian, and animator. He is best known for his stand-up comedy and television work alongside his animated sidekick, "Little Howard". His other animated creations include characters such as Roger T. Pigeon and H:BOT 2000.

Read is a regular contributor to Robin Ince's Book Club and has written extensively for children's television networks, including CBBC, Cartoon Network, Disney XD, and Nickelodeon.

== Career ==
=== Little Howard ===
The stage show The Big Howard and Little Howard Show was nominated for a Perrier Award at the 2003 Edinburgh Festival Fringe. This concept was later adapted into the CBBC television series Little Howard's Big Question (2009–2011), which won a British Writers' Guild Award for Best Children's Television Script in 2011. Read served as the creator, head writer, and lead animator for all 38 episodes.

=== Live comedy and television ===
Outside of his animation work, Read is known for an interactive human Guess Who? stage act. In 2005, he debuted his first solo show, 2005 Comeback Special, at the Edinburgh Festival Fringe.

== Filmography and writing credits ==
Year	Title	Role	Notes	Network / Platform
2001	Polar Bears in a Snowstorm	Creator, writer, animator, voice	Short film; BBC New Comedy Award winner	BBC
2003	Celebdaq	Segment creator, writer, animator	Animated segments	BBC Three
2004	Celebdaq	Performer	Live-action segments	BBC Choice / BBC Three
2005	The World Stands Up	Performer	Stand-up comedy	Paramount Comedy
2005–2006	Two Posh Old Men	Performer	Comedy series	UKTV G2
2006	Stairlift to Heaven	Performer	Comedy broadcast	CBBC / BBC One
2007	Comedy Cuts	Performer	Stand-up showcase	ITV2
2007	The Royal Variety Performance	Performer	Stand-up showcase	ITV1
2009–2012	Little Howard's Big Question	Creator, head writer, lead animator	38 episodes; Writers' Guild Award winner	BBC / CBBC
2013–2014	Gigglebiz	Writer	Sketch comedy	CBeebies
2015	Class Dismissed	Writer	Sketch comedy	CBBC
2015	The Tracey Ullman Show	Writer	Sketch comedy	BBC One
2015	Counterfeit Cat	Writer	Animated series	Disney XD
2014	The Amazing World of Gumball	Writer	Animated series; Episode: "The Shell"	Cartoon Network
2016	The Furchester Hotel	Writer	Children's puppetry series	CBeebies
2016	Danger Mouse	Writer	Animated series	CBBC
2016	The Floogals	Writer	Animated series	Channel 5 / Sprout
2016–2019	Dennis and Gnasher Unleashed	Writer	Animated series	CBBC
2012–2019	Horrible Histories	Sketch and song writer	Series 5–9; BAFTA Winner (Best Children's Comedy)	CBBC
2018	Totems	Writer	Animated short project	Apple TV+ / Sesame Studios
2018	The World's Worst Children	Development writer	Script adaptation	King Bert Productions
2018	Super Natural	Sketch and song writer	Development stage	King Bert Productions
2018–2021	Deer Squad	Writer	Series 1 & 2	Nick Jr. / iQIYI
2019	Ninja Express	Writer	Animated series	CBBC / Boomerang
2019	Incredible Ant	Writer	Animated series	Wildseed Studios / iQIYI
2019	Not the End of the World	Writer	Animated series	Wildseed Studios / Sky
2019	I Don't Wanna Grow Up	Creator, co-writer, performer	Live comedy pilot	Fremantle
2019–2020	Family Jewels	Writer	Adult animation pilot	Wildseed Studios
2021	Rabbids Invasion: Mission to Mars	Writer	Television film	Netflix / France Télévisions
2021–2022	It's Pony	Writer	Series 2	Nickelodeon

== Other work ==
=== Radio credits ===
- 2005: The Milk Run (BBC Radio 1)
- 2007: An A-Z of the British Countryside (BBC 7)
- 2007: Peacefully in Their Sleeps (BBC Radio 4)

=== Theatre credits ===
- 2002: Words and Pictures
- 2003: The Big Howard and Little Howard Show
- 2004: At Home with the Howards
- 2005: The Little Howard Appeal
- 2005: 2005 Comeback Special
- 2007: Little Howard and the Magic Pencil of Life and Death
- 2011: Aladdin
- 2012: Little Howard's Big Show
- 2013: Howard Read - Hide and Speak
