= David Penn (magician) =

English magician

David Penn is a corporate English magician from Northampton. He has been seen in the UK on four major TV series including The Sorcerer's Apprentice on BBC1, The Sorcerer's Apprentice Extra on BBC2, Freaky on Channel 4 and Astounding Celebrities on ITV1 . He reached the live semi -finals of Britain's Got Talent on ITV1. He has been described in The Daily Telegraph as "one of the country's leading illusionists".

Penn became interested in magic after his grandfather showed him a trick that involved pulling coins from behind his ear.

He is known amongst magicians for Refraction, his re-working of the Ted Lesley wine-glass bending effect and his coin bending effect Coinvexed. He also appears every other week with Sean Haydon on a show called the Wizard Product Review.

== Awards ==
David was The Magic Circle Close-Up Magician Of The Year 1994 and in 1995 he was awarded the Zina Bennett Cup by the British Ring of the International Brotherhood of Magicians for Close-Up Magic. He won The British Champion of Illusion at The Blackpool Magic Convention and was named the overall winner of British Magical Championships.
