= Tone (musical instrument) =

Sonic characteristics

Tone is the audible characteristics of a musician's sound. Tone is the product of all influences on what can be heard by the listener, including the characteristics of the instrument itself, differences in playing technique (e.g. embouchure for woodwind and brass players, fretting technique or use of a slide in stringed instruments, or use of different mallets in percussion), and the physical space in which the instrument is played. In electric and electronic instruments, tone is also affected by the amplifiers, effects, and speakers used by the musician. In recorded music, tone is also influenced by the microphones, signal processors, and recording media used to record, mix, and master the final recording, as well as the listener's audio system.

== Stringed instruments ==
The tone of a stringed instrument is influenced by factors related to construction and player technique. The instrument's shape, particularly of its resonant cavity, as well as the choice of tonewood for the body, neck, and fingerboard, are all major determinants of its tone. The material and age of the strings is also an important factor. Playing technique also influences tone, including subtle differences in the amount of pressure applied with the fretting hand, picking or bowing intensity, use of muting and/or drone techniques.

== Amplified instruments ==
The sound of an amplified electric or electronic instrument is affected by each component of its signal chain, from the instrument to the speakers. At minimum, the signal path will consist of the instrument, a preamplifier, a power amplifier, and one or more speakers. Additional signal processing can be added at various points in the signal path, and may also be integrated into the preamplifier circuitry. Preamplifiers and signal processing units typically provide multiple controls to allow the user to "dial in" their tone. These may include equalization controls (such as the tone controls on electric guitars, basses, and amplifiers), " gain, drive, or fuzz" controls, reverb, etc. Electronic keyboards and synthesizers typically have multiple patches that can be selected to make the instrument produce a different timbre.

== See also ==
- Timbre
