= AMC Networks International UK =

EMEA division of AMC Networks International

- Formerly: Zone Vision; Zone Media; Chello Zone; AMC Networks International Zone
- Company type: Division
- Industry: Television distribution
- Founded: 1991; 35 years ago
- Headquarters: London, England
- Key people: Chris Wronski
- Parent: AMC Networks International
- Website: Official website

AMC Networks International UK (EMEA), formerly Zone Vision, Zone Media, Chello Zone and AMC Networks International Zone (EMEA), is a British television media company founded in 1991 by Chris Wronski and owned by AMC Networks International as its EMEA hub that houses its asset interests in that region.

== History ==
The company was founded to distribute television programmes in Eastern Europe, but now operates in 138 countries. They operate channels under 7 brands, albeit with some limited to specific countries, and provide 22 sound tracks across these.

Its English speaking-targeted channels show mainly US and Canadian imports as well as older BBC and ITV produced content; whereas its Central European stations show large quantities of recent British television. Original sound tracks are provided on most shows which are dubbed.

On 14 September 2009, it was revealed that the international arm of CBS, CBS Studios International, struck a joint venture deal with Chellomedia to launch six CBS-branded channels in the UK during 2009. The new channels would replace Zone Romantica, Zone Thriller, Zone Horror and Zone Reality, plus timeshift services Zone Horror +1 and Zone Reality +1. On 1 October 2009, it was announced that CBS Reality, CBS Reality +1, CBS Drama and CBS Action would launch on 16 November 2009 replacing Zone Reality, Zone Reality +1, Zone Romantica and Zone Thriller.

On 5 April 2010, Zone Horror was rebranded as Horror Channel, following the rebrand of the portfolio's other three channels in November 2009. On-air the channel name appears as Horror. The rebrand was produced by Chello Zone's in-house creative services team.

On 1 August 2012 Chellomedia revealed that the European versions of the Chello Zone channels would be rebranded into CBS Reality, CBS Drama and CBS Action as well.

On 28 October 2013, AMC Networks announced it would acquire Chellomedia (apart from its Benelux division) from Liberty Global, for around $1.04 billion. This acquisition was completed 11 February 2014.

In April 2014 it was announced that AMC Networks has acquired Kinowelt TV. A renaming of the channel is currently not planned.

On 8 July 2014, AMC Networks renamed Chellomedia as AMC Networks International and Chello Zone as AMC Networks International Zone (later dropping the 'Zone' for 'UK').

In June 2022, it was announced that AMC would drop the CBS branding from the channels owned in a joint-venture with Paramount Global in a reshuffle of their portfolio. CBS Justice closed down, with its slot being taken over by a new channel called Legend on 30 June 2022. Legend features the majority of the sci-fi, fantasy and horror programming found on Horror, with a dedicated horror sister channel only operating in the evening under the name Horror Xtra. In addition, their Reality channel would get a sister channel as CBS Drama was closed and replaced by Reality Xtra.

In August 2023, it was announced that the AMC UK channel, including all Catch Up Content, would be removed from BT TV on 28 September.

== Channels ==
=== Current ===
- AMC (African and Middle Eastern TV channel)
- AMC (European TV channel)
- True Crime (joint venture with Paramount Networks UK & Australia)
  - True Crime +1 (joint venture with Paramount Networks UK & Australia)
- True Crime Xtra (joint venture with Paramount Networks UK & Australia)
- Legend (joint venture with Paramount Networks UK & Australia)
  - Legend +1 (joint venture with Paramount Networks UK & Australia)
- LegendXtra (joint venture with Paramount Networks UK & Australia)
  - LegendXtra +1 (joint venture with Paramount Networks UK & Australia)
- Sundance TV (Europe)

=== Former ===
- MGM Channel
- Outdoor Channel (joint venture with Outdoor Channel Holdings Inc.)
- Zone Club
- Sundance TV (Africa)
- Sundance TV (Middle East)
- Zone Europa
- Zone Fantasy
- Zone Horror
- Zone Reality
- Zone Reality Extra
- Zone Reality +1
- Zone Romantica
- Zone Thriller
- EVA
- EVA+
- Extreme Sports Channel
- CBS Justice (joint venture with Paramount Networks UK & Australia)
- CBS Reality (joint venture with Paramount Networks UK & Australia)

== Logos ==
Zone Vision first logo used from 1991 to 2005

Chello Zone's final logo used from 2006 until 8 July 2014.

Logo of AMC Networks International used from 2014.
