= Megamax =

Central European pay television channel

- Broadcast area: Hungary; Czech Republic; Slovakia; Romania
- Network: AMC Networks International Central Europe

Programming
- Languages: Hungarian; Romanian; Czech
- Picture format: 576i (16:9 SDTV); 1080p

Ownership
- Owner: AMC Networks International
- Sister channels: AMC; C8; CBS Action; CBS Drama; CBS Reality; SuperOne Music; MusicMix SuperOne; MusicMix; Film Mania; A+ Spider Televízió; Film Cafe; Minimax; Sport1; Sport2; Sport M Spektrum; Spektrum Home; TV Paprika

History
- Launched: 18 April 2011 (Hungary); 19 November 2012 (Romania); 1 December 2012 (Czech Republic and Slovakia)
- Replaced: Zone Club (Hungary)
- Replaced by: JimJam (Central Europe)

Megamax was a pay television channel that was broadcast in Hungary, Romania, Czech Republic and Slovakia, owned by AMC Networks International in Central Europe. It was aimed primarily at children, 7-14 years old and broadcast animated series and teen series.

== History ==
Megamax was first launched in Hungary on 18 April 2011 at 16:00 CET on Telekom and timeshared with Zone Club, which was broadcast 24 hours a day since New Year's Day 2007. On 1 September 2011, Megamax increased broadcast time from 13:00 CET, and on 1 December 2011 from 07:00 CET. On 1 February 2012, Zone Club closed, and the channel became available on the Hungarian UPC Direct.

The channel was launched in Romania on 19 November 2012 and on 1 December 2012, in the Czech Republic and Slovakia.

Megamax began running 24 hours a day in the Czech Republic, Hungary and Slovakia on 1 October 2014 and in Romania on 15 January 2015.

Despite having obtained retransmission agreements with most operators, on 4 November 2019, AMC announced the channel's closure. The main reason of the closure was that the channel failed to obtain a higher audience share to run Hungarian advertising.

== See also ==
- AMC Networks International
- Minimax
