= Acquisition of Warner Bros. Discovery by Paramount Skydance =

2026 business acquisition

- Logos before the acquisition

- Logo after the acquisition
- Initiator: Paramount Skydance (renamed Skydance)
- Target: Warner Bros. Discovery
- Type: Full acquisition
- Cost: $110.9 billion
- Initiated: February 27, 2026; 8 months ago
- Completed: October 6, 2026; 43 days ago
- Status: Completed

On October 6, 2026, Paramount Skydance acquired Warner Bros. Discovery (WBD) for $31 per share, valuing the company at $110.9 billion, with the combined company renamed Skydance. The acquisition was funded by the Ellison family and RedBird Capital Partners, with additional funding being provided by the sovereign wealth funds of Saudi Arabia, Qatar, and the United Arab Emirates (which hold non-voting shares in the company). WBD had originally planned to spin off its less profitable linear television assets as a new company, leaving the flagship Warner Bros. studio and streaming businesses. After Paramount Skydance began making unsolicited offers to acquire WBD as a whole, its board of directors placed the company up for auction; in December 2025, WBD initially accepted an $82.7 billion offer by Netflix, Inc. to acquire the WB studios and streaming business, with the remaining assets continuing as a spin-off known as Discovery Global.

Paramount continued to make unsolicited offers for WBD into 2026, arguing that its offer provided better shareholder value than that of Netflix, would give Paramount and WBD the scale needed to compete with tech companies while preserving a commitment to the cinema industry, and would face less antitrust scrutiny due to Netflix's projected subscription video on demand (SVOD) market share post-acquisition. Paramount CEO David Ellison stated that the combined company would release at least 30 films per year, and maintain the creative independence of divisions such as HBO. On April 23, 2026, WBD shareholders approved a revised offer by Paramount at $31 per share, including an agreement to pay Netflix's breakup fee, and pay an ongoing penalty to WBD shareholders if the sale was not completed by a specific deadline.

Politicians and members of the film industry expressed concern over the resulting scale of the company, its potential impact on jobs, movie theaters, and cable television. Concerns were also raised over the Ellison family's relationship with the Trump administration, its potential influence on the editorial operations of CNN, and the backing of the acquisition by Middle-Eastern wealth funds. The acquisition was approved by the U.S. Department of Justice on June 12, 2026, with no major concessions. The European Commission imposed conditions requiring Paramount to exit its United International Pictures distribution venture with Universal Pictures, while the United Kingdom is requiring that its individual news and children's businesses maintain editorial independence, and will prohibit the combination of its linear and on-demand services for five years.

The completion of the acquisition was delayed by a federal antitrust lawsuit from California and eleven other states, which sought antitrust remedies due to the combined company's total market share of box office and cable television revenue. The Writers Guild of America (WGA) also filed a similar suit. Paramount negotiated a five-year consent decree to resolve the California lawsuit, mandating specific investments towards film production and acquisition, restrictions on its engagement with film exhibitors and television providers, and the establishment of an independent board to oversee the editorial integrity and independence of CBS News and CNN post-acquisition, among other conditions. Amid concerns that the antitrust remedies were not strong enough to address the original concerns, the settlement was approved by the court on September 30, 2026, and the acquisition was completed on October 6, 2026.

The combined company—renamed Skydance Corporation—is led by Ellison and former Mattel executive Ynon Kreiz as co-CEOs; its holdings include two of the five major film studios (Warner Bros. Pictures, Paramount Pictures and related assets such as DC Entertainment), streaming services (such as HBO Max, Paramount+, Discovery+, Philo, and Pluto TV), television studios (CBS Studios, Paramount Television Studios, and Warner Bros. Television Studios), various television networks and cable channels (including the CBS broadcast network; legacy Turner brands such as TBS, TNT, CNN, and Adult Swim; legacy Discovery Inc./Scripps channels such as its namesake, HGTV, and Food Network; legacy Paramount cable networks such as BET, Comedy Central, MTV, and Paramount Network; children's brands Cartoon Network and Nickelodeon; pay television brands HBO and Showtime; and various international television channels), as well as sports divisions (CBS Sports and TNT Sports).

== Background ==
WBD was established on April 8, 2022, and created through AT&T's divestment of WarnerMedia and WarnerMedia's subsequent merger with Discovery, Inc., via a Reverse Morris Trust transaction. Through the agreement, Discovery executives would assume majority control over the merged company, while AT&T would no longer hold any ownership interest. AT&T attempted to reinvent itself as a major player in the entertainment industry through acquiring Time Warner and DirecTV, but later reversed course after losses and unsuccessful synergies. Issues facing WBD were its initial debt load of over $43 billion and heavy market devaluation of its stock, with it losing over 60% of its value by early 2025. To bring down debt, WBD began undertaking strict cost-cutting strategies that included corporate reorganization, controversial tax write-offs, and the removal of dozens of movies and television shows from HBO Max. Despite these efforts, the linear cable networks of WBD continued to lag behind in profits compared to the more profitable streaming and studios businesses.

On December 12, 2024, WBD restructured its operations into two divisions: Streaming & Studios and Global Linear Networks. WBD president and CEO David Zaslav said the new structure would provide "flexibility with potential future strategic opportunities." On June 9, 2025, WBD announced plans to separate into two companies by mid-2026. The successor companies would have been named "Warner Bros.", comprising the Streaming & Studios division, and "Discovery Global", comprising the Global Linear Networks division. Industry analysts offered mixed assessments of the announcement. Some characterized it as an acknowledgment that the 2022 Warner Bros. Discovery merger had underperformed, while others suggested that the separation could make Warner Bros. a more attractive acquisition target for larger companies that were uninterested in its cable networks.

== Initial bidding war ==

Netflix, Paramount, Comcast, and Starz bidded against each other to acquire Warner Bros. Discovery's assets.

In September 2025, Paramount Skydance CEO David Ellison convened a board meeting to discuss a possible acquisition of WBD, a move reported as intended to strengthen Paramount's competitive position against Amazon, Disney, and Netflix. Several days later, Ellison met with Zaslav at his home to propose a cash-and-stock bid of $19 per share. The offer was formalized in a subsequent letter that set the cash component at 60%. Later in September, Paramount Skydance raised its offer to $22 per share with a 67% cash component, a $2 billion reverse-termination fee payable if the deal failed to clear regulatory review, and a provision for Zaslav to remain as co-CEO and co-chairman of the combined company. On October 13, 2025, Paramount Skydance submitted a third offer, raising the bid to $23.50 per share with an 80% cash component. WBD continued to reject Paramount's proposals. An analyst suggested that the bid was meant to preempt potential interest in the studio's business post-split, and take advantage of a "period of industry-wide instability".

After Paramount's three failed attempts, talks of a potential sale of WBD began circulating in October, and the company announced it was reviewing strategic alternatives to its previously announced plan to split into two companies after receiving unsolicited interest from multiple parties. On October 30, 2025, Netflix, Inc. was reported to be actively exploring a bid for the Streaming & Studios unit; the company stressed that it remained "predominantly focused on growing organically", and was not interested in WBD's legacy linear television businesses.

In the first round of non-binding proposals submitted on November 20, 2025, Comcast and Netflix made cash-and-stock and mostly-cash bids for the Streaming & Studios unit, respectively, while Paramount Skydance made an all-cash offer for the entirety of WBD at $25.50 per share, backed by debt financing from Apollo Global Management and Middle-Eastern sovereign wealth funds. Starz submitted a $25 billion bid for the Global Linear Networks division and 20% of the Streaming & Studios division.

After the initial round of bids, WBD solicited a second round of bids. On December 1, 2025, Netflix, Paramount and Comcast all once again submitted binding second-round bids, with Paramount submitting an all-cash $26.50 per share offer for the entire company. After the auction process concluded in December, Standard General was approached by Warner Bros. Discovery shareholders about a potential acquisition of WBD's Global Linear Networks division.

As the process moved to a final decision, Paramount sent a letter to Zaslav alleging that the sale had become "tilted" in favor of Netflix. The letter claimed that the WBD board had embarked on "a myopic process with a predetermined outcome", pointing to alleged conflicts of interest regarding the friendship of Zaslav and Netflix co-CEO Ted Sarandos and questioning whether the auction remained fair.

=== Netflix agreement ===
U.S. streaming market share as of August 12, 2026
1. Others, including Fox One/Fox Nation/Tubi (50.2%)
2. Disney+/FuboTV/Hulu (including Hulu + Live TV) (13.9%)
3. Peacock (11.1%)
4. Netflix (10.8%)
5. HBO Max/Discovery+/Paramount+/Pluto TV (9.00%)
6. Amazon Prime Video (5.00%)

On December 5, 2025, multiple news outlets reported that Netflix had emerged as the leading bidder and had entered exclusive negotiations with WBD to acquire its studio and streaming business, despite objections from Paramount Skydance. Netflix announced the acquisition shortly after, which valued WBD at $82.7 billion enterprise value ($72.0 billion equity value and $59 billion of debt from Wells Fargo, HSBC, and BNP Paribas), and priced post-split Warner Bros. shares at US$27.75. The acquisition would mark a departure from Netflix's stated "builders, not buyers" strategy and a shift toward growth through acquisition. Analysts had not widely anticipated Netflix's participation in the auction process prior to the December reports. Analysts also estimated that a merged Netflix–Warner Bros. entity would have controlled 30.3% of the U.S. streaming market.

Opponents of the acquisition, including trade unions such as the Writers Guild of America and Directors Guild of America, warned that combining WBD's film and television library with Netflix's streaming platform could increase market concentration, reduce competition, and limit creative diversity by consolidating control over content production, distribution, and release strategies within a single company, threatening competitive opportunities for talent. SAG-AFTRA stated that its final position would depend on a full review of the proposal, but assessed that any merger should increase production and protect jobs.

Cinema United—a trade association representing the U.S. cinema industry—raised concerns that Netflix would not support the theatrical release of Warner Bros. films, estimating a potential loss of 25% of domestic box office revenue attributed to its releases. The Committee for the First Amendment described the deal as an "alarming escalation of the consolidation that threatens the entire entertainment industry, the democratic public it serves and the First Amendment", and called upon regulators to ensure that they "categorically refrain from using [their] power to extract political concessions that influence content decisions or chill free speech."

On December 8, 2025, Paramount launched a hostile all-cash offer of $30 per-share for WBD, valuing the company at about $108.4 billion in enterprise value. The bid included equity backing from investors such as the Ellison family and RedBird Capital and debt commitments from major banks, and Paramount said the combined company would be a more competitive media and streaming business than alternatives under consideration. WBD's board said it would review the proposal in accordance with its fiduciary duties and existing agreements. Reports indicated that WBD's board planned to recommend shareholders reject the Paramount Skydance offer in favor of its agreement with Netflix, citing greater certainty and financial terms. The board subsequently rejected the bid and advised shareholders accordingly, while Paramount Skydance said it remained committed to pursuing the acquisition. Around the same time, Affinity Partners withdrew from participating in Paramount's financing consortium.

Paramount argued that its bid would face fewer regulatory and antitrust obstacles than the Netflix deal, as a combination of Netflix and HBO Max would have represented about 43% of global subscription video-on-demand subscribers. The company also accused Netflix of "obfuscat[ing] its dominant position in streaming" by counting social networks such as Facebook, TikTok, and YouTube as part of its competition, reflecting "neither reality nor the historical practice of competition enforcers." It also warned that the Netflix deal would likely lead to fewer theatrical film releases, referring to public statements by Netflix executives who questioned the long-term role of movie theaters. In contrast, Paramount stated that it planned to increase its output to at least 30 theatrical films per-year if it acquired WBD.

Netflix co-CEO Ted Sarandos rebuked Paramount's comments, noting that Netflix had made over 30 theatrical releases in 2026, but that he primarily had an issue with theatrical windows that were not "consumer-friendly". It was noted that most of Netflix's theatrical releases had either been limited releases intended primarily to secure awards eligibility, or alternative programming (such as a sing-along version of KPop Demon Hunters, and event screenings of the Stranger Things series finale) that are not subject to theatrical windows. Sarandos later stated that Warner Bros. would operate "largely like it is today" and maintain a 45-day theatrical window for its releases if it were acquired by Netflix, as the studio generated "billions of dollars of theatrical revenue that we don't want to put at risk".

After the board of WBD endorsed Netflix's lower but previously signed agreement instead of a higher all-cash offer from Paramount Skydance, the company filed suit in the Delaware Court of Chancery. The complaint asked the court to require WBD to provide additional details about its decision-making process, including how it assessed the Netflix transaction, valued its remaining "Global Networks" business, and evaluated the risks and pricing of Paramount's competing tender offer. At the same time, Paramount indicated that it was prepared to pursue a proxy fight. The company announced plans to nominate its own slate of directors to WBD's board in an effort to encourage shareholders to support Paramount's bid rather than the agreement with Netflix.

During the litigation, Paramount Skydance asked WBD for more disclosure about valuations, debt assumptions, adviser analyses, and the board's reasoning for favoring the Netflix deal over Paramount's offer, as part of litigation tied to its takeover attempt. The Delaware Court of Chancery declined to grant Paramount Skydance's request for expedited proceedings, but instead accepted to grant Netflix's request for expedited proceedings. The court's decision allowed WBD to continue pursuing the Netflix deal while Paramount Skydance's litigation proceeded on a standard timetable. On January 13, 2026, Netflix amended its bid from a cash-and-stock deal to all-cash, while maintaining its $27.75 per share price.

On January 22, 2026, the U.S. Department of Justice (DOJ) launched an antitrust review of Netflix's proposed deal. WBD disclosed in a regulatory filing that both companies had received a formal "second request" for information from the DOJ's Antitrust Division on January 16, which paused the statutory waiting period and prevented the transaction from closing pending further review. The second request signaled heightened scrutiny of whether the transaction could lessen competition in streaming, film production, or television distribution markets.

== Paramount Skydance agreement ==
Summary of the North American market share of each studio as of September 20, 2026.
1. Universal Studios (26.0%)
2. Walt Disney Studios (22.0%)
3. Sony Pictures (21.0%)
4. Lionsgate Studios (8.00%)
5. Skydance (via Warner Bros. Entertainment/Paramount Pictures) (9.50%)
6. Other (Note: Includes Amazon MGM Studios, Angel Studios, Fathom Entertainment, GKIDS and Neon Rated, LLC) (8.00%)
7. A24 (5.50%)

=== Revised offers ===
On December 22, 2025, Paramount Skydance amended its offer to address investor concerns, including financing assurances backed by David Ellison's father Larry Ellison. WBD said it would review the revised proposal and advised shareholders to take no action while it evaluated the offer.

Some shareholders said the revised bid still needed improvements. Harris Associates, which owned about 4% of WBD through its Oakmark funds, described the revised offer as improved but insufficient. Portfolio manager Alex Fitch said the competing bids from Paramount and Netflix appeared roughly comparable and that changing transactions would involve costs. He added that Paramount would need to offer stronger incentives to secure shareholder support. Mario Gabelli, founder and chairman of GAMCO Investors, said he was "highly likely" to tender his clients' shares to Paramount Skydance. GAMCO holds approximately 5% of WBD's non-index institutional shares.

On January 7, 2026, TheWrap reported that Pentwater Capital Management—WBD's seventh-largest shareholder—sent a letter to the board urging it to more fully engage with Paramount Skydance's amended proposal. Pentwater chief executive Matt Halbower told CNBC that he viewed Paramount's offer as economically superior to Netflix's, citing valuation and regulatory factors. He also questioned the board's stated concerns about financing risk and argued that Paramount's investors had the capacity to complete the transaction.

On January 16, 2026, British digital, culture, and media secretary Lisa Nandy met with David Ellison to discuss issues affecting the UK's film and television sector. On February 5, 2026, Ellison published an open letter to the UK creative community outlining commitments tied to Paramount's bid for WBD, including increased content investment, continued theatrical releases, and preserving HBO as a distinct brand. Ellison described a Paramount–WBD combination as pro-competition, and criticized the rival Netflix deal as potentially creating excessive market power, a claim Netflix disputed. He also highlighted Paramount's UK operations and pledged support for competition and the creative workforce.

On February 10, 2026, Paramount Skydance added incentives to its bid, stating that it would cover Netflix's $5.8 billion breakup fee, and backstop a debt exchange that would relieve WBD of its obligations to its bondholders. As a display of confidence in the "speed and certainty of regulatory approval" for the deal, Paramount also offered a "ticking fee"—under which it would pay approximately $650 million per-quarter to WBD shareholders if the acquisition was not closed within 2026.

On February 11, 2026, Ancora Holdings—an activist shareholder with a stake valued at nearly $200 million—announced it would vote against the Netflix transaction, support Paramount Skydance's bid, and threatened to initiate a proxy fight if the board declined to engage with Paramount. Ancora argued that Paramount's amended proposal could qualify as a "superior proposal" under WBD's "rushed" and "flawed" agreement with Netflix, citing what it described as regulatory risks associated with the Netflix deal.

=== Reopening negotiations with Paramount ===
On February 17, 2026, WBD said it would reopen negotiations with Paramount Skydance after Netflix granted Paramount a seven-day waiver to submit a "best and final" offer. WBD said Paramount had verbally agreed to raise its bid to at least $31 per share if talks resumed, which WBD accepted. The same day, David Ellison wrote to Senator Cory Booker arguing that Netflix's proposed acquisition would harm competition, and that Paramount Skydance's ownership would expand streaming and theatrical distribution. Ellison did not address most of Booker's questions regarding his communications with the Trump administration or potential changes to CNN. Also on February 17, Netflix co-CEO Ted Sarandos criticized Paramount's bid on CNBC, accusing the company of creating confusion for shareholders. Ancora said it would pursue a proxy fight to replace directors if WBD failed to adequately consider Paramount Skydance's offer.

Growing investor opposition strengthened Paramount's position. Pentwater Capital, a hedge fund and significant WBD shareholder, stated publicly that Paramount's offer was economically more favorable when accounting for regulatory risk and deal certainty. The firm also held discussions with Paramount about potentially supporting a challenge to WBD's board. On February 20, 2026, Paramount said it had satisfied a Hart–Scott–Rodino (HSR) waiting period related to its unsolicited bid for WBD and argued that there was no U.S. statutory barrier to completing the transaction. Netflix disputed Paramount's characterization, stating that the expiration of an HSR waiting period does not indicate regulatory approval and that further review could still occur. The exchange reflected competing public messaging by Paramount and Netflix as regulators continued examining the proposed deals.

On February 22, 2026, the DOJ issued a civil investigative demand of Netflix and WBD to investigate their offer, arguing that it threatened to create a "monopoly". On February 23, 2026, Paramount's insiders told Variety that Paramount's revised offer for WBD would likely come in at $32 per share.

=== Netflix exit, shareholder approval ===
On February 24, 2026, WBD stated it had a received a revised offer from Paramount and was reviewing it in consultation with its financial and legal advisors. Two days later, WBD confirmed that it considered Paramount's increased bid to be superior to Netflix's current offer, triggering a four-business-day period during which Netflix could improve its offer. Paramount's latest bid was reported to be valued at $31 per share. Netflix subsequently declined to increase its bid, and Sarandos and Greg Peters released a statement stating that the deal was "no longer financially attractive".

The next day, Paramount Skydance formally announced its intent to acquire WBD for $31 per share, valuing the company at around $110 billion. The deal was expected to be completed by the third quarter of 2026 at the earliest, pending regulatory and shareholder approval. The Wall Street Journal reported that $24 billion of the $110.9 billion equity acquisition would be funded by the sovereign wealth funds of Saudi Arabia, Qatar and the United Arab Emirates. A Paramount filing with the Federal Communications Commission (FCC) stated that it would be 49.5% foreign-owned following the acquisition, and that these foreign stakeholders would not have voting power. Paramount is also raising $44.5 billion in secured debt to finance the purchase and repay "certain existing debt".

During a conference call on March 2, Ellison stated that the merger was "not about consolidation", but to "expand our reach and enhance our ability to create the world's most compelling stories and experiences." Ellison confirmed that there were plans to merge Paramount+ with HBO Max, and that HBO would continue to operate with creative independence, citing its status as a "crown jewel" that had produced "some of the most powerful stories told over generations." He also stated that the company would continue to license and produce content to and with third-parties.

A shareholder vote on the deal was scheduled for April 23, 2026; the advisory firm Institutional Shareholder Services recommended that shareholders reject a $886 million golden parachute offer by Zaslav, calling it "extraordinary". On April 9, Paramount completed the syndication of a bridge facility and entered into permanent financing transactions with a group of 18 lenders to support the deal. On April 15, 2026, Senator Cory Booker held a spotlight hearing on the potential impacts of the proposed acquisition. The hearing included testimony by filmmaker David Borenstein, actor Mark Ruffalo, attorney Katie Phang, Mara Verheyden-Hilliard of the Partnership for Civil Justice Fund, and WGA East director of legal services Michael Isaac; Ellison was invited to testify at the hearing, but was unable to attend due to a death in his family.

On April 23, 2026, WBD's shareholders voted to approve the sale of the company to Paramount Skydance, but voted against compensation packages for Zaslav and other WBD executives. Zaslav is still expected to earn over $550 million in proceeds from the sale, while Ellison was expected to receive $50 million in cash awards and $100 million in restricted stock units. On May 4, Ellison stated during a Paramount earnings call that the acquisition was on track to be completed by the third quarter of 2026. Australia's Competition and Consumer Commission (ACCC) began to review the proposed acquisition in May 2026.

On May 12, 2026, Paramount's chief legal officer Makan Delrahim told California Attorney General Rob Bonta that the acquisition would "help drive meaningful improvements for movie theaters and their audiences" by "broadening theatrical distribution to tap into the magic of the moviegoing experience and create momentum behind films before they reach streaming services", reiterating Ellison's pledge for the company to release 30 films per-year with a theatrical window of at least 45 days. He contrasted the acquisition to the previous acquisition of 21st Century Fox by Disney, stating that Paramount would not consolidate studios or reduce its theatrical output like Disney, and that its offer was "informed" by a post-COVID-19 market "with three streaming giants dominating audience attention on the one hand, and theaters slowly reemerging as a critical marketing engine and cultural phenomenon that can support Paramount–WBD's efforts to compete in the entertainment ecosystem on the other."

On May 14, 2026, in a letter co-signed by House Democrats Sam Liccardo and Deborah Ross, members of European Parliament Nathalie Loiseau, Brando Benifei, and Andreas Schwab warned that the deal would undergo a "rigorous and comprehensive review" by EU officials, as it threatened to "substantially lessen competition across interconnected markets, including film and television production, content licensing, theatrical distribution, and streaming services". In Europe, it was also noted that the merger could create issues with Paramount's SkyShowtime joint venture, as HBO Max operates in nearly all of its markets, while Comcast and Paramount are subject to non-compete clauses in the markets where SkyShowtime operates.

During a lunch reception after WBD's upfronts presentation on May 14 (which Deadline writer Dade Hayes said was jokingly referred to as "the Last Supper" by a greeter), chief revenue officer Bruce Campbell acknowledged an incoming "year of change" for the company, and told his colleagues and the press that "this team is up for the challenge". On May 19, it was reported that the acquisition could be completed as early as mid-July.

On May 25, 2026, the sale was approved by the Antimonopoly Committee of Ukraine. The next day, Ellison met with members of the DOJ to discuss the deal, once again reiterating the company's plans for theatrical releases.

On June 4, 2026, WBD subsidiary Discovery Global Holdings secured new seven-year term loans to pay off a $15 billion leveraged bridge loan. On June 5, 2026, amid a review of the deal by the state, California attorney general Rob Bonta acknowledged that they had a "central role in being able to protect jobs in Hollywood", and that "there's not a lot of time left before we will need to act if that's what we decide to do." On June 9, Delrahim sent a letter to the DoJ in response to concerns from the International Brotherhood of Teamsters, stating that the deal would lead to an increase of opportunities for union workers and not a reduction, while also accusing Netflix of undermining the acquisition via a "scorched-earth campaign to try and poison regulators and other stakeholders". The same day, the UK's Competition and Markets Authority (CMA) launched a due diligence review of the deal, which was due by August 7, 2026.

On June 10, 2026, the sale was approved in Australia; the ACCC did not impose any major conditions on Paramount, ruling that the acquisition was "unlikely to have the effect of substantially lessening competition in relation to the wholesale supply of films for theatrical release in Australia." Paramount Skydance stated that it had "received necessary approvals for the merger from competition authorities in Saudi Arabia, Ukraine, Serbia and North Macedonia, and from foreign direct investment authorities in Germany, Slovenia, Belgium, Czech Republic, New Zealand, Italy, France, and Romania."

On June 12, 2026, the sale was approved in the United States by the Antitrust Division of the Department of Justice. The transaction was reportedly approved by senior department officials without the input of lower-ranking lawyers, which had sought a wider investigation of its impacts. On June 30, Lisa Nandy stated that the United Kingdom may intervene in the deal due to concerns over the company's domestic market share, and the editorial independence of its news, children's, and on-demand divisions. On July 8, the office of Oregon attorney general Dan Rayfield requested that the sale be halted for 60 days, and that Paramount provide records to the state. The office stated that Paramount planned to complete the purchase no sooner than July 22, citing the proposed review by Oregon. However, Rayfield later dropped the request.

=== Lawsuit and delay ===
On July 13, 2026, the state of California alongside 11 other states filed an antitrust lawsuit in the U.S. District Court for the Northern District of California, seeking to halt the acquisition. The motion argued that the combined company would control over a quarter of U.S. box office and cable television revenue respectively, giving it undue leverage over film exhibitors and television providers that could increase costs to consumers. The suit also argued that since Paramount's previously announced commitments were not legally-binding, the company could still "harm competition by reducing investment and innovation, degrading quality, and raising the price of those 30 films they produce".

A Paramount spokesperson stated that the company would "vigorously defend" itself in court, arguing that the lawsuit was based on a "fundamentally flawed application of the antitrust laws", and that not approving the acquisition would result in "harm [to] entertainment workers who have already suffered over recent years as technology has disrupted their livelihood and cost California tens of thousands of entertainment jobs." On July 14, 2026, the WGA filed its own antitrust lawsuit, arguing that the reduction of competition would give Paramount "both the incentive and the ability to lower costs by suppressing writers' wages and reducing output."

A court hearing for the states'' lawsuit was set to begin on July 17, 2026; the case was assigned to Judge Araceli Martínez-Olguín, after Paramount requested the recusal of Judge P. Casey Pitts due to his prior work as legal counsel for the WGA.

On July 20, 2026, Judge Martínez-Olguín issued a two-week temporary restraining order prohibiting Paramount from consummating the Warner Bros. Discovery acquisition. She ruled that the proposed transaction was likely to violate US antitrust laws, citing the plaintiffs' evidence that the combined company "will possess substantial market share in the wide-release theatrical distribution market."

On July 22, 2026, the sale was approved by the European Commission; it found that the acquisition would not significantly reduce competition in film production, content licensing, television broadcasting, or streaming. However, the Commission took issue with Paramount's ownership of United International Pictures (UIP)—an international distribution joint venture with Universal Pictures that operates in 19 European Economic Area (EEA) territories—arguing that distributing Warner Bros. films through UIP would lead to market concentration in those markets. As a condition of the acquisition, Paramount agreed to divest its stake in UIP to Universal within 13 months of the sale's closure, and to—for 10 years following the acquisition—not enter into any distribution agreements with Universal within the EEA, nor enter into distribution agreements for Warner Bros. films in the 19 aforementioned territories with companies who also distribute Universal or Disney films.

On July 23, 2026, Judge Martínez-Olguín extended the temporary restraining order through August 17, 2026 in order to provide more time for legal proceedings. The next day, Paramount Skydance entered a joint stipulation promising to not complete the WBD acquisition until a ruling in the states' case or June 1, 2027, whichever comes first. As per its agreement, Paramount will become subject to a "ticking fee" beginning in October 2026, requiring that Paramount pay WBD approximately $7 million per-day as a penalty until it completes the acquisition.

On August 1, 2026, it was reported that the office of California governor Gavin Newsom had pushed for attorney general Rob Bonta to seek an out-of-court resolution of the lawsuit, expressing concern that blocking the acquisition would harm the state's job market. On August 4, 2026, Judge Martínez-Olguín scheduled a trial for the WBD–Paramount antitrust case for March 2027. In a New York Times editorial the same day, David Ellison wrote that he felt the lawsuit was actually over whether he could be trusted as owner of CNN, reiterating that Paramount's news divisions "will continue to answer to the facts and to all the people they serve — not to any party or cause", and that "I believe that anyone who oversees a news organization [..] shouldn't put a finger on the scale, especially on matters involving his own company." In an earnings call, Zaslav stated that despite the uncertain fate of the acquisition, WBD's culture and work ethic had been "inspiring", and that "our focus has been 'how do we drive a stronger company to meet our business plan and deliver a stronger and higher-growth company to PSKY and David, so that Paramount coming together with Warner Bros. is even stronger?'"

On August 6, 2026, the acquisition was approved by British authorities, with Paramount agreeing to legally-binding concessions with Nandy prohibiting it from combining linear and on-demand services for five years, and requiring it to maintain editorial independence among its news and children's divisions, and maintain its commitments to UK-produced programming for 5. Block the Merger—an industry group opposed to the acquisition—argued that these concessions "[lend] powerful credibility" to the states' lawsuit.

==== Threats by Paramount to leave California, demand for a bond ====
On August 11, 2026, it was reported that Ellison was discussing the possibility of relocating Paramount out of California as early as October if AG Bonta refused to negotiate a settlement. Bonta released a statement arguing that this threat was "another attempt to blackmail the state into letting an illegal deal through", while the WGA stated that it "further prove[d] the danger of [Paramount's] outsized power over the industry and what that will mean for writers and the creative community." When questioned on the topic at a Politico conference the next day, Delrahim commented that "there's a point at which where you have a duty, a fiduciary duty to your shareholders, and those are the factors you consider", and that if he were governor of California, "I wouldn't want to lose Hollywood from the state. I wouldn't want to lose a major company like Paramount to another state." The company had contemplated a relocation to either Georgia, Tennessee, or Texas.

On August 14, 2026, the sale was approved by authorities in Mexico. Paramount pushed for a settlement of the US federal lawsuit, arguing that the state attorneys general had roadblocked a transaction that has been approved by the US and 67 other countries, and would rather "inflict harm without benefit to their own constituents" than "support a stronger Hollywood and deliver tangible commitments to invest in for the benefit of labor, talent and other industry participants."

On August 17, 2026, Paramount Skydance demanded that the states and the WGA place a $1.88 billion bond to cover the ticking fee among other regulatory and legal costs, citing obligations under the Clayton Act and section 65(c) of the Federal Rules of Civil Procedure; this bond was calculated based on the ticking fee and the scheduled date of the trial. Bonta once again accused Paramount Skydance of blackmail, arguing that that Paramount and Warner Bros. willfully negotiated the ticking fee in the sale agreement despite knowing that the transaction would face regulatory scrutiny. It was also argued that the bond did not have to be placed unless it was proven that the preliminary injunction was "improvidently granted".

On August 24, 2026, Bonta told TheWrap that he would be open to resume negotiating with Paramount Skydance if they stopped "disclosing confidential information from our discussions, but misrepresenting it to the press". Bonta said that the states did not want purely "behavioral" concessions, and suggested the possibility of "structural" remedies such as divesting a "significant" number of its basic cable networks. Bloomberg reported that banks and investors had been preparing for the possibility that Paramount may be required to divest assets in order to resolve the lawsuit, with New Line Cinema and individual cable networks generating particular interest; an analyst estimated that the legacy Turner networks could fetch at least $8 billion.

On August 26, 2026, the attorneys general of Iowa and Montana filed a motion for leave to file a bill of complaint in the Supreme Court, seeking to halt the trial. It argued that the California-led lawsuit constituted "politicized antitrust enforcement by a small handful of states seeking to enjoin a $110 billion merger that the United States, most American states, and competition regulators worldwide have cleared." Iowa AG Brenna Bird wrote in a Daily Wire op-ed that "If California believes a transaction that 68 regulators approved is nevertheless illegal, it is free to make that argument. But it should make it in the one court with the authority to bind all of us, and it should make it now, before the bill for the delay comes due."

A hearing on the bond request was set for September 24, 2026; on August 31, 2026, the plaintiffs filed an opposition, stating that Paramount Skydance was seeking to "extract $1.88 billion from the public and a non-profit labor union to underwrite the costs of two private contracts it entered willfully, with advice of counsel, and for its own benefit", and that granting the request "would incentivize merging parties to negotiate extraordinary fees to inoculate themselves from state and private antitrust enforcement." The plaintiffs recommended that the request be denied, or be a "nominal" $10,000.

On September 11, 2026, Judge Thomas S. Hixson requested that the plaintiffs and Paramount participate in a two-day settlement conference at the end of October, later set for October 14–15. On September 12, Politico obtained a report that was commissioned by Paramount from the Los Angeles Economic Development Corporation Institute for Applied Economics, which found that California would lose nearly 29,000 to 58,000 full-time job-years across all industries if the company were to leave the state entirely, representing a loss of $10.6 to $21.2 billion in economic output. In a court filing the same day, Paramount argued that the states "lack[ed] regulatory authority over the merger, which is vested in the U.S. Department of Justice", that the lawsuit ignored the "reality" that studios face significant competition from streaming services, and that the acquisition has the support of the United States' three largest cinema chains (AMC, Cinemark, and Regal).

On September 15, 2026, the DOJ filed a statement of interest backing Paramount's demand for a bond, stating that "the plain meaning of the statute and the contemporaneous use of 'proper bond' in dictionaries and federal court decisions makes it clear the amount of the bond must be fit, suitable, adapted, and correct to compensate the defendant for 'damages for an injunction improvidently granted'", and reiterating that the acquisition had already been approved by federal authorities. The next day, multiple officials, including Bonta and Los Angeles mayor Karen Bass, reported that Paramount officials had renewed their threat to leave California.

==== Settlement and consent decree ====
On September 18, 2026, The Wall Street Journal reported via anonymous sources that Paramount was in "advanced" talks with California officials on a possible settlement. CNN media correspondent Brian Stelter reported on September 20 that at least four attorneys general—including Letitia James of New York and William Tong of Connecticut—were hesitant and seeking additional concessions, including requiring CNN to remain separate and editorially independent from CBS News. TheWrap reported that a "hold separate" arrangement was being discussed, which would allow Paramount to complete the acquisition while the antitrust lawsuit is pending (thus reducing the impact of the "ticking fee"), but prohibit any outright integration of the companies until it is resolved. Other concessions were also reportedly discussed, including the divestment of certain cable networks, a mandate that Paramount Pictures and Warner Bros. Pictures operate independently from each other, and the formation of an independent oversight board to monitor Ellison's film output commitment and the editorial independence of CNN.

On September 21, 2026, it was announced that Paramount Skydance had reached an out-of-court settlement with the state of California and WGA that would allow the acquisition to go through, with Ellison stating that the acquisition would be completed within "approximately two weeks". Paramount agreed to a five-year consent decree, imposing various concessions, including:

- Releasing 30 films per-year for two years following the completion of the acquisition, and then at least 32 films for the next three years afterwards.
  - At least 20% of this quota must be films with a budget of at least $50 million, at least 20 must be wide releases, at least 50% must be films acquired from or co-produced with a third-party, and at least four of them must be independent films.
  - If the company does not meet the quota, it must pay a penalty of $30 million for each missed film, which will be split between the Motion Picture & Television Fund, the National Association of Attorneys General, and health care and retirement trust funds for Hollywood labor unions. If it does not fulfill the quota after a six-month grace period, the company will be required to divest its stake in Miramax.
  - All films must adhere to industry-accepted release windows of 45 days in theatres, and 90 days before they are released to subscription video on-demand.
- Investing $1.5 billion over the five years (at least $300 million per-year) into productions within the United States.
  - If a federal tax credit for film and television production of at least 20% is passed, the company must increase US film production to 20% in the first two years, and then 30% in the last three years. If California or New York pass an uncapped state tax credit, US production must increase to 40%.
- Investing at least $5 million per-year in a fund for acquiring independent films.
- Investing at least $9.5 million per-year in career development and education programs for employees that are laid off as a direct result of the merger.
- Maintaining Paramount and Warner Bros.' separate studio lots.
- Conditions on fees and distribution terms with exhibitors, including fees remaining unchanged for at least three years.
- Establishing a "news editorial independence board" to oversee CBS News and CNN's "adherence to ethical journalism as defined by journalism industry best practices and to editorial independence", based on "guiding editorial and journalism principles" derived from their existing policies for "accuracy, independence, fairness and journalistic integrity". The board will consist primarily of veteran journalists appointed by the company's board.
- Conducting carriage negotiations for the Paramount and WBD cable networks separately and independently, with restrictions on changes to existing agreements, and the use of confidential information from one half of the company being used as part of negotiations for cable networks from the other half.
  - If the company violates these conditions, it will be ordered to divest the BET channels, Comedy Central, Destination America, Science Channel, Smithsonian Channel, and/or VH1.
- Maintaining "service and quality levels" at Pluto TV that are "at or above" existing levels under Paramount.
- The WGA also reached a settlement that will prohibit layoffs of CBS News writers for the same five-year period, and require the company to pay its attorney's fees, and $17.5 million to the union's health fund.

A court hearing to finalize the terms was scheduled for September 24, 2026. Bonta stated that the settlement was "not a vote of support for this merger", but that it "locks in a massive upside" in comparison to the Disney–Fox merger, and that "I'd rather resolve the case in the boardroom rather than the courtroom, and that's what happened here." Notably, the settlement does not immediately impose any of the "structural" remedies that were proposed by Bonta, but only imposes them as penalties for violations of provisions of the consent decree. Governor Newsom stated that he "didn't pressure" anybody to make the deal, and that "we — me, many folks, including the mayor, soon-to-be governor-elect [Xavier] Becerra and others — preferred, in the words of Rob Bonta himself, that he focus on getting this done at the boardroom, not the courtroom."

On September 24, 2026, the court approved an emergency motion by Block the Merger to allow the filing of amicus briefs in opposition to the settlement, which the group stated was "weak, unenforceable, and leaves workers, journalists, and consumers in the dust." Paramount opposed the motion, stating that allowing the filings would extend the hearing, and therefore force the company to "incur tens (if not hundreds) of millions of dollars of payments", while adding nothing to the record that "offer[s] the Court information or perspective that the existing record does not already supply." Cory Booker sent a letter requesting an independent public interest review, as the settlement "has reached the Court without a competitive impact statement, without a public comment period, and without any formal opportunity for theaters, distributors, workers, or consumers to be heard."

Briefs were submitted by Block the Merger and the League of United Latin American Citizens (LULAC); Block the Merger felt that the 30-film commitment was less than what Paramount and Warner Bros. were scheduled to release in 2027 on their own, and that the settlement's conditions on their cable operations would still allow the combined company to "use its power in other offerings—a combined HBO and Showtime (premium cable channels), a combined HBO Max and Paramount+ (streaming services), and CBS (broadcast)—to extract higher prices in basic cable negotiations, as this form of leveraging is carved out." The LULAC argued that the settlement contained "defects" that "concern the competitive harms the States pleaded, including diminished quality, variety, and viewpoints." On September 30, 2026, Martínez-Olguín approved the settlement, ruling that it was a "reasonable factual and legal resolution of the dispute". Filings by Paramount stated that they aimed to complete the acquisition by October 6, 2026. The same day, it was announced that outgoing Mattel CEO Ynon Kreiz would become a co-CEO, responsible for integration and day-to-day operations. The acquisition was completed on October 6, 2026, as planned.

On October 2, 2026, Ellison announced that the combined company would be known as Skydance Corporation.

On November 18, 2026, it was announced that Warner Bros. Television Group and Paramount Television Studios would both combine to Warner Bros. Television Studios beginning in early 2027.

== Government and industry responses ==
=== Industry ===
Cinema United, a trade association representing U.S. cinema operators, warned that industry consolidation could reduce the number of films released theatrically and increase studios' leverage in negotiations with exhibitors.

Filmmaker James Cameron publicly backed an acquisition of WBD by Paramount, arguing that a Netflix takeover "would be a disaster" due to the company's perceived lack of commitment to theatrical releases, and that Paramount was "the best choice".

Senator Adam Schiff and Representative Laura Friedman asked for details on U.S. production, union jobs, AI safeguards, and competition, seeking responses by February 15, 2026, to assess the impact of both deals on Hollywood workers.

Roy Price wrote that an acquisition of Warner Bros. by Netflix could lead to fewer shows being made and "a narrower range of storytelling" with "decision making around one organization's or one individual's point of view". He supported an acquisition of WBD by Paramount, arguing that both companies were "spending enough to lose money but not enough to win" at streaming, but that combining scale would allow better investments in premium content, increase output, and allow the companies to pay top talent competitively, as multiple scale players would be "healthier for Hollywood than three giants and a couple of stragglers".

On February 13, 2026, AGC Studios chairman Stuart Ford criticized Netflix's proposed acquisition of Warner Bros. during a keynote at the European Film Market in Berlin, warning it could harm the film industry's financial model. He said a studio-streamer merger might reduce backend participation and residuals for producers and talent, though he noted that stronger theatrical commitments could lessen some concerns. Ford argued that streaming-driven consolidation could threaten traditional revenue-sharing practices that support industry workers.

On February 18, 2026, Cinemark Theatres CEO Sean Gamble said exhibitors were cautious about Netflix's pledges to maintain traditional theatrical release windows, citing the company's history and calling for firmer assurances. He described the situation as "active and fluid" as Netflix and Paramount Skydance competed for WBD. Gamble said Cinemark, individually and through Cinema United, had remained in contact with the companies and regulators to advocate for sustained exclusive theatrical windows. He added that exhibitors had long believed Netflix would eventually recognize the value of theatrical releases, noting that Amazon and Apple had embraced the model.

Prior to the shareholder vote in April 2026, an open letter signed by over 5,000 actors and creative personnel was circulated by the WGA, Committee for the First Amendment, Democracy Defenders Fund, and the Future Film Coalition. The letter argued that the proposed Paramount Skydance acquisition would "prioritize the interests of a small group of powerful stakeholders over the broader public good", and would "grievously" compromise the integrity, independence, and diversity of the industry. Mark Ruffalo stated that many industry members were afraid to sign the letter, since there was "a deep, ugly and pervasive fear of speaking out." Paramount responded to the letter, reiterating Ellison's previously announced commitments to 30 theatrical releases per-year and "independent creative leadership" of its brands, and arguing that the purchase would allow the company to "greenlight more projects, back bold ideas, support talent across multiple stages of their careers, and bring stories to audiences at a truly global scale—while strengthening competition by ensuring multiple scaled players are investing in creative talent.".

On April 14, 2026, it was reported that Paramount had pulled advertising from the entertainment news site The Ankler after chief columnist Richard Rushfield was seen carrying a bag of "Block the Merger" buttons at CinemaCon.

Bob Wieckowski wrote, in May 2026, "this deal won't seemingly impact either" consumer pricing or competition and that "without the merger, the likely outcome will be a weaker domestic market. That will mean fewer productions, investments and jobs here in California."

From June 6–16, 2026, the American Economic Liberties Project, the Committee for the First Amendment, Democracy Defenders Action, the Future Film Coalition, and WGA hosted a three-city tour of joint demonstrations known as "Main Street vs. The Merger" at the Lumiere Cinema in Los Angeles, the WGA East headquarters in New York City, and the Plaza Theater in Atlanta, Georgia.

On July 27, 2026, Benedict Cumberbatch, Alan Cumming and Benedict Wong published a joint op-ed in The Guardian urging the British government to intervene in the WBD acquisition, arguing that it "would harm our workers, our culture and the public."

On July 29, 2026, AMC Theatres CEO Adam Aron published a Variety op-ed in favor of the Paramount acquisition, arguing that increased scale was necessary for traditional studios to compete with tech companies, highlighting Ellison's commitment to theatrical releases, and arguing that his stewardship of Paramount proved that he was a "consummate movie executive". Regal Cinemas CEO Eduardo Aznar and Cinemark then made their own statements in support of the merger and calling for a settlement, stating that they believed that Ellison would stand by his commitments, and that the uncertainty of a prolonged antitrust suit would be detrimental to the industry. Cinema United then made a similar statement calling for California and Paramount to "meet in the immediate future and discuss all possible avenues" to settle the lawsuit.

In August 2026, WME Group executive chairman Ari Emanuel published a Wall Street Journal op-ed in support of the Paramount acquisition, stating that the California lawsuit was "trash" because it ignored the "fastest-growing competitors on the market" (such as A24, Amazon MGM Studios, and Lionsgate, streaming video providers such as Netflix and YouTube, as well as non-film media such as video games), and argued that "when government officials manipulate markets to reach political outcomes, antitrust stops protecting competition and starts threatening it."

On September 1, 2026, Tom Cruise voiced his support for the merger on The Pat McAfee Show; he argued that Ellison's oft-promised slate was "awesome" and that Hollywood needed to come together as a "community" to support it, as it would provide more opportunities for "every writer, every director, every producer, every artist. And the only way you do it is we have to create an abundance. Its production begets production."

Word of a potential deal was criticized by Senator Elizabeth Warren, Block the Merger, and Mark Ruffalo. Warren stated that "as [President Donald Trump] tries to ban CNN from the White House, it would be a massive mistake to cave on the Paramount merger", while Block the Merger stated that it was "an insult to everyone who has stood up against this harmful transaction and to the hundreds of thousands of workers, journalists, and consumers who will be hurt if it goes forward", and that "an agreement based on unenforceable concessions is a win only for David Ellison".

=== Consumer lawsuits ===
In April 2026, Paramount Skydance was sued by a group of streaming customers seeking to halt the acquisition, arguing that acquiring Warner Bros. Discovery would reduce viewpoint diversity and lead to an increase in prices for its services. On June 4, Paramount Skydance filed a motion to dismiss the suit, arguing that the complaint did not present enough evidence that the acquisition was anti-competitive. In July 2026, Judge Araceli Martínez-Olguín declined the consumers' request for a preliminary injunction, finding that they had "not offered any evidence and this have not made a clear showing of a likelihood of success, nor to they make a clear showing of irreparable harm."

=== Government ===
==== Congressional and political reactions ====
U.S. conservatives notably opposed Netflix's bids to acquire WBD in favor of Paramount Skydance's bids, due to David and Larry Ellison's support of U.S. president Donald Trump. Conservatives accused Netflix of using its dominance to promote left-wing and progressive ideology in the United States and internationally. On January 11, 2026, Trump shared an OANN op-ed on Truth Social that accused Netflix of seeking to "dominate the national imagination through raw market power and ideological activism", and having "repeatedly used its global platform to elevate progressive narratives while suppressing dissenting viewpoints." During hearings on the Netflix deal, Republican lawmakers similarly criticized Netflix for promoting ideological "propaganda", "DEI", and "wokeness".

==== Foreign funding concerns ====
The financing for the Paramount Skydance bid includes $24 billion in funding from sovereign wealth funds associated with Saudi Arabia, Qatar, and the United Arab Emirates. A filing stated that these investors, along with Affinity Partners, agreed to forgo governance rights and representation on the board of directors; the Ellison family and RedBird Capital Partners would remain the sole class A shareholders and hold all voting rights. The company said that this structure would place the transaction outside the scope of review by the Committee on Foreign Investment in the United States (CFIUS). The same filing reported that Tencent had also withdrawn its financing from the proposal, which Paramount Skydance said was intended to avoid potential CFIUS review. The funding would still be subject to a review by the FCC due to Paramount Skydance's ownership of broadcast licenses, as the Communications Act prohibits broadcasters from being more than 25% foreign-owned without a waiver, and the acquisition would increase Paramount's foreign ownership to 49.5%.

When asked about Jared Kushner, whose firm Affinity Partners was among the external financiers of Paramount's bid, Trump said "I've never spoken to him about it. He's really trying to work on Gaza. His primary thing is Gaza." Senior Trump administration officials had previously told CNBC that the administration viewed the Netflix acquisition with "heavy criticism". Affinity Partners withdrew its financing on December 16, 2025.

On January 14, 2026, U.S. Representative Sam Liccardo, a Democrat from California, called on Paramount Skydance to submit any potential acquisition of WBD to a foreign ownership review, even if such a filing was not legally required. In a letter to David Ellison, Liccardo said that a voluntary review would demonstrate good faith, strengthen public trust, and provide assurances regarding national security, data privacy, and potential foreign influence risks.

On March 23, 2026, a group of Democratic senators led by Cory Booker sent a letter to the FCC demanding a "full and independent review" of the acquisition. The senators wrote that "the constellation of foreign investment from China and from Gulf states, with complex and sometimes competing relationships with the United States, demands rigorous, not perfunctory, review."

On April 27, 2026, Paramount filed with the FCC for a foreign ownership waiver, stating that the investments were needed to help the company "compete more effectively in the provision of television broadcast services and in the broader video programming marketplace", and assuring that these investors would not hold any voting power. On May 20, the Senate Committee on Commerce, Science, and Transportation sent a letter to FCC chairman Brendan Carr demanding a "rigorous" review of the deal, warning that the large equity stake held by sovereign wealth funds associated with countries hostile to freedom of the press could result in "unprecedented influence".

On September 17, 2026, the FCC issued a declaratory ruling granting the foreign ownership waiver, stating that it would serve the public interest. The waiver is subject to conditions requiring Paramount to obtain new waivers if it seeks to change the voting interests of the foreign investors cleared by the waiver, or its foreign voting interests exceed 25% in aggregate. Anna M. Gomez—the sole Democratic commissioner at the FCC—criticized the decision, warning that the sale would "let some of the most repressive governments in the world indirectly control nearly all of a combined Paramount–Warner Bros.", and that "an investment this large in one of America's biggest media companies doesn't just buy equity, it secures influence over what gets said and what gets made."

==== Trump administration and political influence concerns ====
Trump discussing the Netflix–WBD agreement on the Kennedy Center Honors red carpet (from 18:10).

The Wall Street Journal reported that after the Netflix deal was publicly announced, Larry Ellison called Trump to argue that the deal would hurt competition. Before Paramount Skydance's hostile takeover bid was announced, it was also reported that David Ellison went to Washington DC and promised Trump administration officials that he would make big changes to CNN. Larry Ellison reportedly discussed with White House officials replacing specific CNN hosts that Trump reportedly dislikes. Trump has stated that he thinks that it is "imperative" that CNN be included in an acquisition "because the people that are running CNN right now are either corrupt or incompetent". CNN is among the various news organizations against which Trump has pursued retaliatory litigation and his administrations have removed the press credentials of their reporters, and while the Paramount Skydance proposal included the purchase of CNN, the Netflix proposal did not.

Taking questions before the Kennedy Center Honors on December 7, 2025 (an event historically filmed for broadcast by Paramount's CBS), Trump told a reporter that Netflix's market share after acquiring WBD "could be a problem", and that he would "be involved in that decision." He also praised Netflix co-CEO Ted Sarandos, stating that "I have a lot of respect for him. He's a great person, he's done one of the greatest jobs in the history of movies." NBC News noted that it was rare for US presidents to directly intervene in antitrust cases.

In an interview with CNBC on December 8, 2025, David Ellison suggested that CNN would be merged with CBS News, which had been included in the Paramount–Skydance merger that was completed on August 7, 2025. Before the Paramount–Skydance merger, Paramount Global paid a $16 million settlement in a lawsuit Trump filed against the company over alleged deceptive editing on 60 Minutes that observers suggested was necessary for the merger to be approved by the Federal Communications Commission (which was required because of Paramount's ownership of 28 broadcast licenses of CBS-affiliated television stations). After the acquisition, David Ellison made a series of changes to CBS News that anonymous sources within the division suggested were in response to Trump's criticisms of the organization, including hiring Kenneth R. Weinstein (the former CEO of the conservative think tank Hudson Institute) as ombudsman, conservative columnist Bari Weiss as editor-in-chief (in a deal that also included the acquisition of her digital publication The Free Press), and ending its corporate DEI initiatives. FCC chair Brendan Carr said that the agency would probably have no role in approving a proposed acquisition of WBD by Netflix, as neither companies hold broadcast licenses. (Note: Prior to its acquisition by AT&T, Time Warner sold Atlanta's WPCH-TV (the former WTBS, and its only U.S. broadcast station) to Meredith Corporation to streamline government approval of the deal. Turner had already outsourced operations of WPCH under an agreement with Meredith's then-CBS affiliate WGCL in 2011.)

When asked in the CNBC interview whether he thought Trump was more supportive of the Paramount Skydance proposal, David Ellison said, "What I would say is I'm incredibly grateful for the relationship that I have with the President, and I also believe he believes in competition." Trump also previously arranged for Larry Ellison to acquire a sizable ownership share of TikTok as part of the enforcement of the ban-or-divestment law for foreign adversary controlled social media applications enacted in the United States in 2024. As the Justice Department's Antitrust Division and the Federal Trade Commission (FTC) have overlapping jurisdiction in reviewing mergers and acquisitions for compliance with U.S. antitrust laws, Paramount Skydance submitted required forms with both the FTC and the DOJ on December 8. On December 12, 2025, Trump purchased corporate debt security bonds from both WBD and Netflix, valued at up to $500,000 each.

In a February 4, 2026, interview with NBC News' Tom Llamas, Trump walked back his previous remarks and stated that he would not involve himself in reviewing the WBD deal, leaving the process to the DOJ. He explained that "there is a theory that one of the companies is too big, and it shouldn't be allowed to do it. And the other company is saying something else. They are beating the hell out of each other, and there will be a winner."

On March 13, 2026, Defense Secretary Pete Hegseth publicly stated that he looked forward to CNN being bought by the Ellisons while criticizing the network due to its coverage of the 2026 Iran war, saying: "The sooner David Ellison takes over that network, the better".

On May 8, 2026, the Freedom of the Press Foundation and Reporters Without Borders issued a request to Paramount chief legal officer Makan Delrahim for access to books and records under Delaware law, in order to investigate allegations that the company was currying favors with the Trump administration to expedite approval of the WBD acquisition. On May 12, 2026, House Democrats Jamie Raskin and Frank Pallone sent a letter to Ellison requesting records of donations to Trump or his causes, and to similarly disclose whether he had made any offers to the president to change CNN's coverage post-acquisition in exchange for expedited approval.

US attorney general and Trump's former personal lawyer Todd Blanche stated that he was "part of [the] decision" by the DOJ to approve the Paramount acquisition.

On July 15, 2026, David and Larry Ellison were sued by a Paramount shareholder, accusing them of offering "illegal private benefits" to Trump in order to expedite government approval for the sale, including the dismissal of CNN anchors that Trump had been critical of. Paramount argued that the suit "recycles allegations that have already been reported and already addressed", and that "no commitments from either David or Larry Ellison have been made to any government body, State AG, or federal agency regarding the future of CNN or any other news property, other than the goal to deliver truth-based journalism".

On October 6, 2026, after the deal completed, Trump praised the newly formed company, stating “It’s gonna be a great company.”

==== Congressional hearings and investigations ====
In February 2026, Netflix co-chief executive officer Ted Sarandos and WBD chief strategy officer Bruce Campbell testified before the United States Senate regarding the company's proposal. While the Senate does not directly approve such transactions, the hearing provided lawmakers with an opportunity to seek information on the deal's potential impact on consumers, workers, and competitors. In response to questioning regarding the transaction's potential effects on theatrical distribution and the film production ecosystem, Sarandos stated that the company would commit to a 45-day theatrical exhibition window for films produced by WBD following the proposed acquisition. Lawmakers from both parties raised concerns regarding the deal's potential impact on competition, labor markets, and content distribution. Senators questioned Sarandos on issues including residual payments, employment conditions in the entertainment industry, and Netflix's market position relative to other platforms. Sarandos stated that residuals were governed by collective bargaining agreements negotiated through the Alliance of Motion Picture and Television Producers and cited industry data indicating growth in residual payments in recent years. Senators also examined the competitive relationship between subscription-based streaming services and advertising-supported platforms such as YouTube.

Sarandos argued that viewing patterns increasingly overlapped across platforms and cited the expansion of professionally produced content and long-form programming on YouTube, as well as its growing share of television-based viewing. Members of the Senate Judiciary Subcommittee on Antitrust described the proposed acquisition as significant in scale and raised concerns regarding consolidation in the streaming industry. Subcommittee chair Mike Lee stated that the transaction warranted scrutiny due to its potential effects on competition for creative talent, content distribution, and consumer choice, including risks associated with vertical integration. Senator Cory Booker expressed concerns about the cultural and market implications of further consolidation in the entertainment industry and said that representatives of competing bidder Netflix had agreed to testify publicly at the hearing. Also testifying was Bruce Campbell, chief revenue and strategy officer of WBD. Netflix executives have stated that they have engaged in discussions with the U.S. Department of Justice Antitrust Division, European Union competition authorities, and state attorneys general regarding the transaction. The proposed acquisition remains subject to regulatory review, and Netflix has characterized the deal as pro-competitive, while regulators and lawmakers continue to assess its potential effects on market concentration and consumer outcomes.

Following testimony in February 2026 before the Senate Judiciary Subcommittee on Antitrust, Competition Policy, and Consumer Rights, lawmakers continued to evaluate Netflix's proposed acquisition of the studio and streaming assets of WBD. During the hearing, Sarandos addressed questions related to market competition, consumer impact, and the company's role in the global entertainment industry. The hearing formed part of a broader legislative and regulatory review process examining whether the transaction would comply with antitrust standards and serve the public interest. Lawmakers did not reach conclusions during the session, and the proposed acquisition remains subject to further regulatory scrutiny.

On February 6, 2026, Senator Adam Schiff and Representative Laura Friedman sent a letter to Sarandos and Greg Peters, and to David Ellison, requesting detailed commitments regarding the preservation and expansion of film and television jobs in Los Angeles in connection with their respective proposed mergers involving Warner Bros. The lawmakers noted prior public statements by Sarandos and Ellison asserting that their bids for the studio would benefit consumers and strengthen competition. Sarandos had stated that Netflix's proposed merger with Warner Bros. would help create and protect jobs in the entertainment industry. Schiff and Friedman wrote that such statements should be supported by concrete, measurable commitments to California and U.S. workers, emphasizing the importance of maintaining California's role as a center of film and television production. Ellison said that Paramount and WBD would continue to operate separately and preserve jobs after the Paramount–WBD merger deal closed.

On February 12, 2026, Gail Slater left her post as assistant attorney general for the antitrust division; CBS News reported she was removed by senior Trump administration officials. Confirmed with bipartisan support in 2025 and seen by some Democrats as a guard against political interference, her departure came as Live Nation Entertainment faced an antitrust trial and settlement talks with Justice Department officials outside the division, while deputy Mark Hamer also exited that week.

On February 25, 2026, Sarandos scheduled a visit to the White House by February 26 to talk about Netflix's bid. Axios later reported that after Sarandos arrived in Washington, he did not meet with Trump or any White House officials because the meeting was canceled, and that he instead met only with Justice Department officials.

==== U.S. states and cities ====
In February 2026, Republican state attorneys general from (Alabama, Alaska, Iowa, Kansas, Montana, Nebraska, North Dakota, South Carolina, Tennessee, Utah and West Virginia) sent a letter to the United States Department of Justice to express concern that a Netflix merger with Warner Brothers would "likely result in undue market concentration that stifles competition and therefore creates higher prices, lower reliability, and less innovation for one of America's major industries—all to the detriment of American consumers."

In an interview with MS NOW's Jacob Soboroff, California Attorney General Rob Bonta said reports that he was looking to require Paramount to divest CNN as a condition for the deal to go through were "opining".

On July 13, 2026, 12 Democratic attorneys general from twelve states (Arizona, California, Colorado, Connecticut, Massachusetts, Minnesota, Nevada, New Jersey, New Mexico, New York, Oregon, and Washington state), sued to block the acquisition. Bonta's press release said, "The proposed merger, the largest in Hollywood history, would combine two of Hollywood's five major film distributors and two of the five major basic cable channel owners."

On July 31, 2026, California Governor Gavin Newsom expressed concerns about the state lawsuit and said that if the merger were blocked, state employment would suffer. Newsom has also encouraged Bonta to find a resolution out of court. On August 11, 2026, California Democratic gubernatorial nominee Xavier Becerra urged both sides to settle the lawsuit, followed by Los Angeles Mayor Karen Bass on August 20.

The Los Angeles County Department of Economic Opportunity estimated that the merger would result in a loss of 15,567 jobs overall, 2,495 of which being in Los Angeles County, and put $4.06 billion in local business output and $547 million in tax revenue at risk.

== Investors ==
Major investors involved in the proposed acquisition include Harris Associates, GAMCO Investors, Ancora Holdings, Pentwater Capital Management, and Sachem Head Capital Management.

=== Harris Associates (Oakmark Funds) ===
Harris Associates, through its Oakmark Funds, owned about 4% of WBD outstanding shares, making it the company's fifth-largest shareholder during the takeover battle. Portfolio manager Alex Fitch said after the initial Netflix agreement that the bidding process was not over and encouraged Paramount Skydance to raise its offer. In December 2025, after WBD's board rejected Paramount's $108.4 billion hostile bid, Fitch told Reuters that the Netflix and Paramount proposals were similar in overall value. However, he described Netflix's offer as stronger in its deal terms, indicating that Harris Associates might support a revised Paramount bid if it addressed concerns about the transaction's structure.

After Paramount amended its offer on December 22, 2025, including a personal guarantee from Larry Ellison, Alex Fitch of Harris Associates described the changes as "essential, yet inadequate". He said Paramount would need to offer "a more compelling incentive" to secure shareholder support. Harris Associates' comments were seen as influential in shaping market expectations about what would qualify as a competitive bid and maintained pressure on both Netflix and Paramount to improve their proposals. In its fourth-quarter 2025 investor letter, the Oakmark Fund stated that it was "pleased with the steps the WBD board has taken thus far to unlock shareholder value" and would "continue to closely monitor developments" as the bidding process continued.

=== GAMCO Investors ===
GAMCO Investors, led by chairman and CEO Mario Gabelli, owned about 5.7 million shares of WBD, representing roughly 5% of its non-index institutional shares and valued at about $160 million. Gabelli was an early and outspoken supporter of Paramount Skydance's takeover bid. On December 10, 2025, two days after Paramount launched its hostile tender offer, he told TheWrap that he was "highly likely" to tender his clients' shares. He cited the relative simplicity and certainty of Paramount's $30-per-share all-cash offer, compared with Netflix's more complex proposal, which included a combination of cash, stock, and a spinoff of WBD's cable networks.

In the following months, Gabelli continued to support Paramount Skydance's bid for WBD. In February 2026, he appeared on CNBC's Money Movers to discuss competing offers and their potential impact on the entertainment industry. After WBD's board determined that Paramount's revised $31-per-share offer was superior and Netflix chose not to increase its bid, Gabelli told NBC News that "the board finally woke up and did the math." He reiterated his view that Paramount's all-cash proposal offered greater value and certainty for shareholders.

=== Ancora Holdings ===
Ancora Holdings, the activist investment arm of the Ohio-based Ancora Holdings Group, which manages about $11 billion in assets, built a stake in WBD valued at roughly $200 million, or about 0.3% of the company. Although its ownership stake was relatively small, Ancora had experience in activist investing, including proxy contests at companies such as Norfolk Southern, C.H. Robinson, and Forward Air. On March 3, 2026, The Wall Street Journal described Ancora as "one of Wall Street's fiercest activist investors" in coverage of its involvement in the WBD takeover battle.

On February 11, 2026, Ancora announced that it would vote against the proposed Netflix transaction and support Paramount Skydance's bid. The firm also said it would begin a proxy contest to replace members of WBD's board if the company did not engage with Paramount. In a 51-page presentation released to investors, Ancora described the Netflix agreement as "flawed, inferior, and high-risk" compared with Paramount's all-cash offer. It criticized the board for "hastily entering into a problematic agreement with Netflix instead of diligently pursuing a better offer". r argued that the board had "no choice" but to consider Paramount's revised proposal as one that "could reasonably lead to a Superior Proposal", citing regulatory uncertainty surrounding the Netflix deal.

Ancora's involvement influenced the outcome of the takeover contest. Along with pressure from Pentwater and other shareholders, its threat to launch a proxy contest contributed to WBD reopening negotiations with Paramount after Netflix was granted a seven-day waiver in February 2026. After WBD's board determined that Paramount's $31-per-share offer was superior and Netflix withdrew its bid, Ancora issued a statement describing the result as a "win-win for both shareholders and the entertainment sector". The firm said it was "delighted to have highlighted the necessity for the WBD Board to explore a more substantial and assured arrangement with Paramount".

=== Pentwater Capital Management ===
Pentwater Capital Management, WBD's seventh-largest shareholder with about 50 million shares, played a significant role in urging the company's board to more fully consider Paramount Skydance's competing bid. In January 2026, Pentwater chief executive Matt Halbower sent a letter to WBD Chairman Samuel DiPiazza stating that the board had "violated its fiduciary duty" by rejecting Paramount's offer without sufficient review. In an interview with CNBC, Halbower described Paramount's proposal as "economically superior" to Netflix's, citing differences in valuation and potential regulatory challenges. He also questioned the board's concerns about Paramount's financing risk. Pentwater Capital Management increased its involvement in February 2026 after reports indicated that Paramount Skydance was considering chief executive Matt Halbower as a potential nominee to WBD board as part of a possible proxy contest. Halbower confirmed that discussions had taken place but said that "if they're truly fulfilling their fiduciary duties, then there would be no necessity for me to join the board." Pentwater's public backing of Paramount, along with the prospect of a board challenge, added pressure on WBD's directors to defend their support for the Netflix agreement. This pressure contributed to the board's decision to reopen negotiations with Paramount in February 2026.

=== Sachem Head Capital Management ===
Sachem Head Capital Management disclosed in a February 2026 filing with the U.S. Securities and Exchange Commission that it had more than doubled its stake in WBD during the fourth quarter of 2025, increasing its holdings to nearly 8 million shares. The investment ranked among the firm's ten largest U.S. equity positions. Sachem Head, which has been described as following an "active constructivist" investment strategy, often engages directly with portfolio companies. Its expanded position in WBD was seen as reflecting confidence in potential gains from the ongoing takeover contest and suggesting that some investors viewed the company's shares as undervalued relative to possible transaction outcomes.

Although Sachem Head did not publicly oppose the Netflix agreement or threaten a proxy contest, as Ancora and Pentwater did, its increased stake was closely watched by investors as a sign of institutional sentiment. The disclosure came at a pivotal point in the takeover battle, as Paramount intensified efforts to challenge the Netflix deal and other activist shareholders publicly urged WBD's board to enter into negotiations.

== Assets ==
Paramount Skydance projected that a merger with WBD would create a media company generating about $70 billion in annual revenue, $16 billion in EBITDA, and $10 billion in cash flow, with around 207 million streaming subscribers. The combined company would include Warner Bros. and Paramount's film, television, and video game studios, HBO/HBO Max, DC Studios, and numerous cable and broadcast networks alongside its content libraries. Its portfolio would also include major sports rights and reunite several networks—such as MTV, Nickelodeon, VH1, and Comedy Central—with other Warner companies after more than 40 years.

=== Key assets ===
Skydance
Paramount Skydance	Warner Bros. Discovery
=== Paramount Skydance Studios === ==== Paramount Motion Pictures Group ==== : Paramount Pictures; Paramount Animation; Paramount Primal; Paramount Players; Nickelodeon Movies; Republic Pictures; Miramax (49%, co-owned with beIN Media Group); Miramax Family & Animation; Miramax Television; Skydance Animation; Skydance Animation Madrid; Paramount Home Entertainment; CBS Home Entertainment; Paramount Music; Paramount Pictures Domestic Distribution (North American exhibition); Paramount Pictures International (International distribution); Paramount Studio Group – physical studio and post-production; The Studios at Paramount – production facilities & lot; Paramount on Location – production support facilities throughout North America including New York, Vancouver, and Atlanta; Worldwide Technical Operations – archives, restoration and preservation programs, the mastering and distribution fulfillment services, on-lot post-production facilities management; ==== Paramount Television Group ==== : Paramount Television Studios; South Park Digital Studios (joint venture with Park County); CBS Studios; Big Ticket Television; BET Studios; CBS Eye Animation Productions; Nickelodeon Animation Studio; Avatar Studios; United Plankton Pictures, Inc. (its management is under Nickelodeon's current SpongeBob management); Nickelodeon Digital; Paramount Television International Studios; Paramount Global Content Distribution; ==== Paramount Experiences ==== : Paramount Themed Entertainment; Paramount Parks & Resorts – licensing and design for parks and resorts; Paramount Consumer Products; Paramount Games Studio; Paws, Inc.; Paramount Global Publishing; Paramount Shop; Paramount Licensing, Inc.; Paramount Advertising; ==== Paramount Sports Entertainment ==== : Skydance Sports; === Paramount Skydance TV Media === ==== CBS Entertainment Group ==== : CBS; CBS Media Ventures; CBS Media Ventures Media Sales; Dabl (operated by Weigel Broadcasting); CBS News and Stations; CBS News; CBS News 24/7; CBS MoneyWatch; See It Now Studios; The Free Press; CBS Television Stations; KCBS-TV 2 / KCAL-TV 9 Los Angeles; KOVR 13 / KMAX-TV 31 Sacramento – Stockton – Modesto, California; KPIX-TV 5 / KPYX 44 San Francisco – Oakland – San Jose, California; KCNC-TV 4 Denver, Colorado; WFOR-TV 4 / WBFS-TV 33 Miami–Fort Lauderdale, Florida; WTOG 44 St. Petersburg – Tampa, Florida; WUPA 69 Atlanta; WBBM-TV 2 Chicago; WBXI-CD 47 Indianapolis; WJZ-TV 13 Baltimore; WBZ-TV 4 / WSBK-TV 38 Boston; WWJ-TV 62 / WKBD-TV 50 Detroit / Windsor, Ontario; WCCO-TV 4 / KCCW-TV 12 Minneapolis–Saint Paul — Walker, Minnesota; WCBS-TV 2 / WLNY-TV 55 Riverhead – New York City; KYW-TV 3 / WPSG 57 Philadelphia; KDKA-TV 2 / WPKD-TV 19 Jeannette – Pittsburgh, Pennsylvania; KTVT 11 / KTXA 21 Fort Worth – Dallas; KSTW 11 Tacoma – Seattle; Start TV (a 50% JV with Weigel Broadcasting); Dabl (Operated by Weigel Broadcasting); CBS Local Digital; CBS News New York; CBS News Los Angeles; CBS News Boston; CBS News Bay Area; CBS News Minnesota; CBS News Philadelphia; CBS News Colorado; CBS News Pittsburgh; CBS News Chicago; CBS News Texas; CBS News Sacramento; CBS News Baltimore; CBS News Miami; CBS News Detroit; CBS Sports; CBS Sports Network; CBS Sports HQ; CBS Sports Golazo Network; CBS Sports Digital; 247Sports; CBSSports.com; CBS Local Sports; CBS Broadcast Center; Ed Sullivan Theater; === Paramount Media Networks === ==== Nickelodeon Group ==== : Nickelodeon; Nick at Nite; Nick Jr.; Nick Jr. Channel; Nicktoons; TeenNick; NickMusic; ==== MTV Entertainment Group ==== : MTV; MTV2; MTV Classic; MTV Live; MTVU; Tr3s; Comedy Central; CMT; CMT Music; Logo; Paramount Network; Pop TV; Smithsonian Channel; TV Land; ==== Showtime Networks ==== : Paramount+ with Showtime; Showtime 2; Showcase; SHO×BET; Showtime Extreme; Showtime Family Zone; Showtime Next; Showtime Women; The Movie Channel; The Movie Channel Xtra; Flix; ==== BET Media Group ==== : BET; BET Gospel; BET Her; BET Jams; BET Soul; BET Digital; VH1; === Paramount International Networks === : Nickelodeon; Nick Jr.; MTV; Paramount Network (Netherlands and Poland); ==== United Kingdom & Australia ==== : Channel 5 Broadcasting Limited; 5; 5Action (formerly Paramount Network); 5Select; 5Star; 5USA; 5 (streaming service); Network Ten Pty Limited; Network 10; ATV Melbourne; TEN Sydney; TVQ Brisbane; ADS Adelaide; NEW Perth; 10 Comedy (formerly 10 Peach); 10 Drama (formerly 10 Bold); 10 HD; 10 (formerly 10 Play); Gecko; Nickelodeon Australia (formerly 10 Shake); True Crime (with AMC Networks International UK); True Crime +1; True Crime Xtra (with AMC Networks International UK); Legend (with AMC Networks International UK); Legend +1; LegendXtra (with AMC Networks International UK); LegendXtra +1; ==== The Americas ==== : TIS Productions (majority stake); ==== EMEAA ==== : Ananey Communications; Ego; The Food Channel; The Travel Channel; The Good Life Channel; Health Channel; Hot Comedy Central; Nutz Productions; Shamaim Productions; Mars Interactive; Post Office Post Production & Creative; === Paramount Skydance Direct-to-Consumer === : Paramount+; FuboTV (undisclosed stake); Pluto TV; SkyShowtime (50%, joint-venture with Comcast); Philo (joint venture with A+E Global Media, AMC Global Media, and Warner Bros. Discovery); === Other === : ParamountPressExpress.com, a hub for Paramount press releases; Showcase Cinemas (internationally)	=== Warner Bros. Entertainment === ==== Warner Bros. Motion Picture Group ==== : Warner Bros. Pictures; Warner Bros. Pictures Animation; Swaybox Studios; New Line Cinema; Warner Bros. Clockwork; Castle Rock Entertainment (brand, trademark and back library); Spyglass Media Group (minority stake); Warner Bros. Pictures Domestic Distribution (North American exhibition); Warner Bros. Pictures International Distribution (international distribution and production; most active in France, Germany, Italy, Spain, the United Kingdom, the Republic of Ireland, Poland, the Philippines, Japan, Taiwan, Thailand, South Korea, Argentina, Brazil and Mexico); Warner Bros. Film Productions Germany; ==== Warner Bros. Television Group ==== : Warner Bros. Television Studios; WBTVS Scripted Production; Alloy Entertainment; WBTVS Unscripted Production; Telepictures; Telepictures Music; DC All Access; True Crime News; Warner Horizon Unscripted Television; Shed Media; Bonanza Productions; NS Pictures; Warner Bros. Television Workshop; Creative Group; Warner Bros. Domestic Television Distribution; Warner Bros. International Television Distribution; Warner Bros. Animation; Cartoon Network Studios; Hanna-Barbera Studios Europe; Turner Classic Movies; ==== Other ==== : Warner Bros. Studio Facilities; Warner Bros. Museum; Warner Bros. Studios Burbank; Warner Bros. Studios Leavesden; Warner Bros. International Dubbing & Subtitling; Warner Bros. Digital Networks; Warner Bros. Digital Labs; OneFifty; Sports & Entertainment Digital Network; Warner Bros. Digital & Online; Warner Bros. Podcast Network; Warner Bros. Home Entertainment; Discovery Home Entertainment; Warner Bros. Anti-Piracy Operations; Warner Bros. Theatre Ventures; DC Entertainment; DC Studios; Warner Bros. Japan; Warner Bros. Japan Anime Production; Geffen Pictures; WaterTower Music; Fandango Media (25%; with Versant); Fandango (movie ticketing platform); Fandango (streaming service); INDY Cinema Group; MovieTickets.com; Rotten Tomatoes; Rotten Tomatoes Movieclips; Turner Entertainment Co.; Wolper Organization; Flagship Entertainment Group (with China Media Capital (41%) and TVB (10%)); === Warner Bros. Streaming === : WBTV (FAST streaming channels); ==== Home Box Office, Inc. ==== : HBO Max; HBO; HBO Latino; HBO Comedy; HBO Drama; HBO Movies; HBO Hits; HBO International; HBO Asia; HBO Family; HBO Hits; HBO Signature; HBO New Zealand; HBO Europe; HBO2; HBO3; HBO Latin America; HBO Brasil; HBO Caribbean; HBO2; HBO Plus (HBO+); HBO Family; HBO Signature; HBO Mundi; HBO Pop; HBO Xtreme; Cinemax; Cinemax Hits; Cinemax Action; Cinemax Classics; Cinemáx (Spanish-language); Cinemax on Demand; Cinemax International; Cinemax (Europe); Cinemax 2 (Europe); Cinemax (Latin America); Cinemax (Asia); HBO Bulk; HBO Films; HBO Documentary Films; ==== TNT Sports International ==== : TNT Sports (United Kingdom) (50% with BT Group); TNT Sports 1; TNT Sports 2; TNT Sports 3; TNT Sports 4; TNT Sports 5; TNT Sports 6; TNT Sports 7; TNT Sports 8; TNT Sports 9; TNT Sports 10; TNT Sports Ultimate; TNT Sports Box Office; TNT Sports Box 2; TNT Sports Films; TNT Sports (Argentina); TNT Sports Premium (Argentina); TNT Sports (Brazil); TNT Sports (Chile); TNT Sports Premium (Chile); TNT Sports (Mexico); === Warner Bros. Global Experiences === : Warner Bros. Discovery Global Themed Entertainment; Warner Bros. Theme Parks; Parque Warner Madrid (5%); Warner Bros. Studio Tours; Warner Bros. Studio Tour Hollywood; Warner Bros. Studio Tour London – The Making of Harry Potter; Warner Bros. Studio Tour Tokyo - The Making of Harry Potter; Warner Bros. Studio Tour Shanghai - The Making of Harry Potter; Warner Bros. Discovery Global Consumer Products; Warner Bros. Games; Avalanche Software; NetherRealm Studios; Portkey Games; Rocksteady Studios; TT Games; TT Games Publishing; TT Fusion; Traveller's Tales; TT Odyssey; WB Games Boston; WB Games Montréal; WB Games New York; WB Games San Francisco; Warner Bros. Discovery Publications; DC Comics; MAD; DC Black Label; DC's Young Animal; Sandman Universe; Hill House Comics; Murphyverse; DC Graphic Novels for Kids; DC Graphic Novels for Young Adults; Milestone Media; Wonder Comics; WildStorm; DC Universe Infinite; === Global Networks === ==== Entertainment, Factual & Lifestyle Group ==== : Discovery+; Philo (joint venture with A+E Global Media, AMC Global Media and Paramount Skydance); Discovery Studios; Discovery Digital Studios; Discovery Adventures (out-of-home brand); Discovery at Sea (joint venture with Princess Cruises); The Cartoon Network, Inc.; Cartoon Network; Boomerang; Adult Swim; Toonami; Discovery Family (60% with Hasbro); Discovery Familia; Williams Street; TBS; TNT; TruTV; American Heroes Channel; Animal Planet; Discovery Channel; Discovery en Español; Discovery Turbo; Investigation Discovery; Science Channel; Destination America; Discovery Life; HGTV; Hogar de HGTV; Travel Channel; Magnolia Network (joint venture with Chip and Joanna Gaines' XVI, LLC); Television Food Network, G.P. (69% with Nexstar Media Group); Food Network; Cooking Channel; Food.com; Oprah Winfrey Network (95% with Harpo Productions); TLC; ==== Warner Bros. Discovery News & Sports ==== : CNN; CNN en Español; CNN Business; CNN app; CNN Brasil (licensed to Novus Media); CNN Chile (licensed to Carey Media); CNN Indonesia (licensed to Trans Media); CNN-News18 (licensed to Network18 Group); CNN Portugal (licensed to Media Capital); CNN Prima News (licensed to Prima Group); CNN Türk (licensed to Demirören Group); Antena 3 CNN (licensed to Intact Media Group); A2 CNN (licensed to G2 Media sh.); CNN International; CNN Films; HLN; Great Big Story; TNT Sports; TNT Sports Interactive; NCAA.com (joint venture with the NCAA); PGA.com (joint venture with PGA of America); Bleacher Report (website); House of Highlights (social media network); MLB Network (cable channel; 16.67% with Major League Baseball, NBC Sports Group, Charter Communications and Cox Communications); Golf Digest (magazine); Eurosport; Eurosport.com (EMEA & Asia-Pacific); ==== Warner Bros. Discovery International ==== : Animal Planet; Boomerang; Cartoon Network; Adult Swim; Cartoonito; Discovery Channel; TNT; TNT Novelas; TNT Series; TruTV; Discovery Turbo; Discovery Kids; DMAX; Food Network; HGTV; Science Channel; Investigation Discovery; Travel Channel; TLC; Warner TV; Warner Bros. International Television Production; Warner Bros. Television Studios UK; Renegade Pictures; Ricochet; Twenty Twenty Television; Wall to Wall Media; WBITVP Australia; WBITVP Latin America; WBITVP Nederland; WBITVP New Zealand; WBITVP Nordics; WBITVP France; WBITVP Belgium; WBITVP Spain; WBITVP Portugal; ===== Americas ===== : Discovery Home & Health; Discovery Theater; Discovery World; HTV; Raze; Golf Channel Latin America; Space; Tooncast; ===== Asia-Pacific ===== : JTBC (5.72%); World Heritage Channel; Discovery Japan; Animal Planet; Cartoon Network; Discovery Japan Inc. (joint venture with JCom); Movieplus; LaLa TV; MONDO TV; TABI Channel; Warner Bros. Discovery India; Discovery Tamil; Pogo; ===== Europe, Middle East and Africa ===== : Boing (49% with MFE – MediaForEurope); Boing (Africa); K2 (49% with Mediaset); Frisbee (49% with Mediaset); Boing (Italy) (49% with Mediaset); Boing (Spain) (50% with Mediaset España); Fatafeat; Quest; Quest Red; Really; Tele 5; Warner Bros. Discovery Italy; Giallo; Nove; Real Time; Warner Bros. Discovery Denmark; 6'eren; Canal 9; Kanal 4; Kanal 5 (Denmark); Warner Bros. Discovery Finland; TV5; Kutonen; Frii; Warner Bros. Discovery Norway; TVNorge Gruppen; TVNorge; FEM; MAX; VOX; Rex (Norwegian TV channel); Warner Bros. Discovery Sweden; Kanal 5 (Sweden); Kanal 9; Kanal 11; ===== TVN Warner Bros. Discovery ===== : Discovery Historia; Metro; TVN Group; TVN; TVN 7; TVN24; TVN24 BiS; TVN Fabula; TVN International; TVN International Extra; TVN Style; TVN Turbo; TTV; Canal+ Poland (32%; with Canal+ Group and Liberty Global); === Other === : All Elite Wrestling (minority share)

== See also ==
- Media capture
- 2019 merger of CBS and Viacom, a media merger that recombined CBS Corporation and Viacom, which had previously split in 2005 from Viacom's original incarnation, into a single company called ViacomCBS (later known as Paramount Global).
- Acquisition of NBC Universal by Comcast, a corporate act of Comcast that acquired NBCUniversal from Vivendi and General Electric.
- Acquisition of 21st Century Fox by Disney, a corporate act of The Walt Disney Company which acquired the majority of 21st Century Fox assets.
