= Zone Fantasy =

- Broadcast area: Italy; Japan and South Korea; Netherlands; Poland; Sweden; Europe; Middle East and North Africa (especially Arab world and Israel); Sub-Saharan Africa; Asia-Pacific; (separate feeds)
- Network: Chello Zone

Programming
- Picture format: 576i (4:3 SDTV)

Ownership
- Owner: Chellomedia Liberty Global
- Sister channels: Zone Club; Zone Europa; Zone Horror; Zone Reality; Zone Romantica; Zone Thriller

History
- Launched: 15 May 2006; 19 years ago
- Closed: 6 September 2011; 14 years ago
- Replaced by: Horror Channel

Links
- Website: www.it.zonefantasy.tv

Zone Fantasy was a television film channel in Italy that featured diverse programming. Zone Fantasy was targeted towards a mixed 16- to 45-year-old demographic, and focused on adventure, fantasy, horror and science fiction genres.

The channel transmitted 24 hours a day, 7 days a week on SKY Italia.

The channel ceased its broadcasts on 6 September 2011 and was rebranded by Horror Channel.
