= AMC (African and Middle Eastern TV channel) =

Middle Eastern and African-based pay television channel

- Broadcast area: Africa; Arab world
- Network: AMC Networks International UK

Programming
- Languages: English (subtitles in Arabic available in the Arab world)
- Picture format: 1080i HDTV (downscaled to 16:9 576i for the SDTV feed)

Ownership
- Owner: AMC Networks International
- Sister channels: SundanceTV; CBS Action; CBS Reality; RealityXtra; Extreme Sports Channel; Outdoor Channel; JimJam

History
- Launched: 1 December 2014; 10 years ago
- Replaced: MGM Channel
- Closed: 1 July 2021; 4 years ago (Arab world)
- Former names: MGM Channel

Links
- Website: amctvafrica.com

AMC Middle East and Africa was a European-based pay television channel which was launched by AMC Networks International in Africa and the Arab world. AMC replaced the MGM Channel on 1 December 2014. AMC-produced dramas such as Halt and Catch Fire and The Divide are among the first original series that premiered on the channel. The channel also airs films from MGM, Universal Studios, Paramount Pictures, Disney (20th Century Studios) and Sony Pictures Entertainment.

On 1 August 2016, AMC stopped broadcasting on OSN and moved to beIN in the Arab world. On 1 July 2021, AMC stopped broadcasting on beIN in the Arab world.

== Programming ==
- 4th and Loud
- Breaking Bad
- Fargo
- Fear the Walking Dead
- Halt and Catch Fire
- Hollywood's Best Film Directors
- Mad Men
- Rectify
- The Divide
- The Night Manager
