= Zone Thriller =

European TV channel

- Broadcast area: United Kingdom; Ireland
- Network: Chello Zone

Programming
- Picture format: 576i (SDTV)

Ownership
- Owner: Chellomedia Liberty Global
- Sister channels: Zone Club; Zone Europa; Zone Fantasy; Zone Horror; Zone Reality; Zone Romantica

History
- Launched: July 3, 2006; 19 years ago
- Closed: November 16, 2009; 16 years ago
- Replaced by: CBS Action

Links
- Website: zonethriller.tv

Zone Thriller was a television channel in Europe that launched on 3 July 2006. The channel aired a number of varying movie styles including psychological dramas and murder mysteries.

On 14 September 2009, it was revealed that the international arm of CBS, CBS Studios International, struck a joint venture deal with Chellomedia to launch six CBS-branded channels in the UK during 2009. The new channels would replace Zone Romantica, Zone Thriller, Zone Horror and Zone Reality, plus timeshift services Zone Horror +1 and Zone Reality +1. On 1 October 2009, it was announced that CBS Reality, CBS Reality +1, CBS Drama and CBS Action would launch on 16 November 2009 replacing Zone Reality, Zone Reality +1, Zone Romantica and Zone Thriller. On 5 April 2010, Zone Horror and Zone Horror +1 were rebranded as Horror Channel and Horror Channel +1, following the rebrand of the portfolio's other three channels in November 2009.

== Past programming ==
This is a list of programs that was previously broadcast by Zone Thriller.

- 18 Wheels Of Justice
- Adventure Inc.
- Good Morning Psychic
- Remington Steele
- Starsky & Hutch
- The Pretender
- The Bourne Identity
- La Femme Nikita
- Twisted
- The Fugitive (2000) TV remake
- Queen of Swords
- Detective Conan
