= Zone Romantica =

- Country: United Kingdom
- Broadcast area: Europe
- Network: Chello Zone/Chello Central Europe

Programming
- Picture format: 576i 4:3 (SDTV)

Ownership
- Owner: Chellomedia Liberty Global
- Sister channels: Zone Club; Zone Europa; Zone Fantasy; Zone Horror; Zone Reality; Zone Thriller

History
- Launched: Central & Eastern Europe: 1 March 1998; UK & Ireland: 3 September 2007
- Closed: UK & Ireland: 16 November 2009; Hungary: 2 July 2012; Central & Eastern Europe: 3 December 2012
- Replaced by: Romania: Romantica (2007–2012); UK & Ireland: CBS Drama (2009); Hungary & Romania: Film Café (2012); Central & Eastern Europe: CBS Drama (2012); Poland: CBS Action (2012) Polsat Romans (2013)
- Former names: Romantica (Until 2006)

Links
- Website: zoneromantica.tv romantica.tv UK

Zone Romantica (formerly Romantica) was a European TV channel that launched in 1 March 1998. The channel broadcast a mixture of telenovelas, music and entertainment from all over the world, but mainly from Latin America. The channel was available 24 hours a day, to 20 territories across Europe and the Middle East. The channel reached 8 million subscribers.

The channel launched on Sky Digital in the UK and Ireland on 3 September 2007. It was broadcasting between 8 a.m. and 3 a.m. from the start. Its slot on the Sky EPG had been purchased from BEN TV.

On 6 May 2008, it was one of the channels that were on the free-to-air platform Freesat platform from the start.

On 14 September 2009, it was revealed that the international arm of CBS, CBS Studios International, struck a joint venture deal with Chellomedia to launch six CBS-branded channels in the UK during 2009. The new channels would replace Zone Romantica, Zone Thriller, Zone Horror and Zone Reality, plus timeshift services Zone Horror +1 and Zone Reality +1. On 1 October 2009, it was announced that CBS Reality, CBS Reality +1, CBS Drama and CBS Action would launch on 16 November 2009 replacing Zone Reality, Zone Reality +1, Zone Romantica and Zone Thriller. On 5 April 2010, Zone Horror and Zone Horror +1 were rebranded as Horror Channel and Horror Channel +1, following the rebrand of the portfolio's other three channels in November 2009.

On 2 July 2012, Hungarian version of Zone Romantica is replaced by Film Café. On 1 August 2012, Chellomedia revealed that all European versions of the Zone Channels would be rebranded into CBS Channels. CBS Action replaced Zone Romantica on 3 December 2012. On 1 September 2013, Zone Romantica had completely closed replacing Polsat Romans on Poland. On 3 December 2012, in Europe, Zone Romantica has rebranded to CBS Drama.

== Programming ==
Programme Line-up for UK/Éire features 3 Classic First Run US Daytime Soap Operas.

=== Current shows ===
- A escrava Isaura
- Amazônia, de Galvez a Chico Mendes
- Aunque mal paguen
- ¿Dónde está Elisa?
- El encantador
- Hilda Furacão
- La quiero a morir
- Los misterios del amor
- Mulher
- Muñoz vale por 2
- Pocholo
- Sabrosa pasion
- Sabrosa pasion plus
- Salvador de mujeres
- Vivir asi
- Voltea pa' que te enamores
- La diosa Coronada
