= Zone Club =

European lifestyle and entertainment channel

- Broadcast area: EMEA; Parts of Asia-Pacific
- Network: Chello Zone

Programming
- Picture format: 576i (4:3 SDTV)

Ownership
- Owner: Chello Central Europe/Chellomedia; Liberty Global
- Sister channels: Zone Europa; Zone Fantasy; Zone Horror; Zone Reality; Zone Romantica; Zone Thriller

History
- Launched: 1998; 28 years ago (EMEA); 1 April 2001; 25 years ago (Poland); 13 September 2004; 21 years ago (Hungary)
- Closed: 1 April 2010; 16 years ago (EMEA); 1 February 2012; 14 years ago (Hungary); 3 December 2012; 13 years ago (Poland)
- Replaced by: Europe: Fine Living Network (2010); Hungary: Megamax (2012); Poland: CBS Drama (2012)
- Former names: Club (1998-2006); Poland: Club TV (2010-2012)

Links
- Website: www.zoneclub.tv

Zone Club was a European lifestyle and entertainment channel. It launched in 1998 as Club. It then launched on 1 April 2001 in Poland, and on 13 September 2004 in Hungary.

== History ==
The Hungarian version was originally 24/7 on the UPC Direct satellite platform, but on cable, it timeshared with TV2's Írisz TV, which was broadcast between 18:00-23:00 CET. On 27 June 2006, as part of Zone Vision's channels rebranded under the "Zone" brand, Club became Zone Club. The channel became 24/7 in Hungary on 1 January 2007, when Írisz TV closed.

The channel focused on six programme categories: style, health, home, travel, food and relationships. It also broadcast dramas and documentaries. It targeted women aged 18 to 39 and was available 24/7 in five languages, reaching 6 million viewers in 22 countries across Europe, the Arab World and Korea. On 27 December 2010 Zone Club in Poland changed its name into Club TV.

The Hungarian version of the channel became timeshared again by 18 April 2011, when Chello Central Europe launched its new kids channel, Megamax, broadcasting between 16:00-22:00 CET. Megamax's broadcast hours were extended to 15 hours (7:00-22:00 CET) in late 2011, leading Zone Club being broadcast at night.

In EMEA, Zone Club closed on 1 April 2010 and was replaced by Fine Living Network. On 1 February 2012, Zone Club closed in Hungary and was completely replaced by Megamax. On 1 August 2012 Chellomedia revealed that all European versions of the Zone Channels would be rebranded into CBS channels. CBS Drama replaced Club TV in Poland on 3 December 2012.

== Programming ==
=== Final shows ===
- $h*! My Dad Says
- 30 Rock
- 3rd Rock from the Sun
- 8 Simple Rules
- ALF
- According to Jim
- Better with You
- The Big Bang Theory
- The Fresh Prince of Bel-Air
- Gary Unmarried
- George Lopez
- The Inbetweeners
- The King of Queens
- Malcolm in the Middle
- Mike & Molly
- Rules of Engagement
- Saved by the Bell
- Spin City
- SpongeBob SquarePants
- That '70s Show
- Tim and Eric Awesome Show, Great Job!
- Titus
- Two Guys and a Girl
- Two and a Half Men
- UEFA Europa League

=== Former shows ===
- 64 Zoo Lane
- 10 Grand in Your Hand
- Adam Richman's Best Sandwich in America
- Airwolf
- Alias
- Amazing Water Homes
- The Amazing Race
- America's Most Desperate Kitchens
- The Big C
- Beachfront Bargain Hunt
- Brian Boitano Project
- Brian Boitano's Italian Adventure
- Candice Tells All
- Caribbean Life
- Color Splash
- Cool Pools
- Cousins on Call
- Criminal Minds
- Curb Appeal
- Daryl's Restoration Over-Hall
- Dear Genevieve
- Desperate Landscapes
- Desperate Housewives
- Dharma & Greg
- Diners, Drive-Ins and Dives
- Drop 5 lbs with Good Housekeeping
- Extreme Homes
- Floyd
- Grounded for Life
- How I Met Your Mother
- Hung
- It's Always Sunny In Philadelphia
- In Plain Sight
- Kipper
- Kitchen Nightmares
- Little Einsteins
- Madagascar Maverick
- Madventures
- Making Tracks
- Market Values
- Meet the Amish
- Meet the Natives
- Miracle on Everest
- Motorcycle Karma
- The Music Nomad
- Outrageous Fortune
- Party of Five
- Playing the Field
- Psych
- The Practice
- Return to Eden
- Roswell
- Saturday Night Live
- Sex and the City
- Sex, Love & Secrets
- Shogun
- Spider-Man: The New Animated Series
- Star Trek: Deep Space Nine
- Star Trek: Enterprise
- Star Trek: The Next Generation
- Star Trek: The Original Series
- Star Trek: Voyager
- Stargate Atlantis
- Stargate SG-1
- Starsky and Hutch
- Step by Step
- Still Standing

== See also ==
- Zone Romantica
- Zone Europa
- Zone Reality
- Chello Zone
