= CBS Action (Poland) =

Polish pay television channel

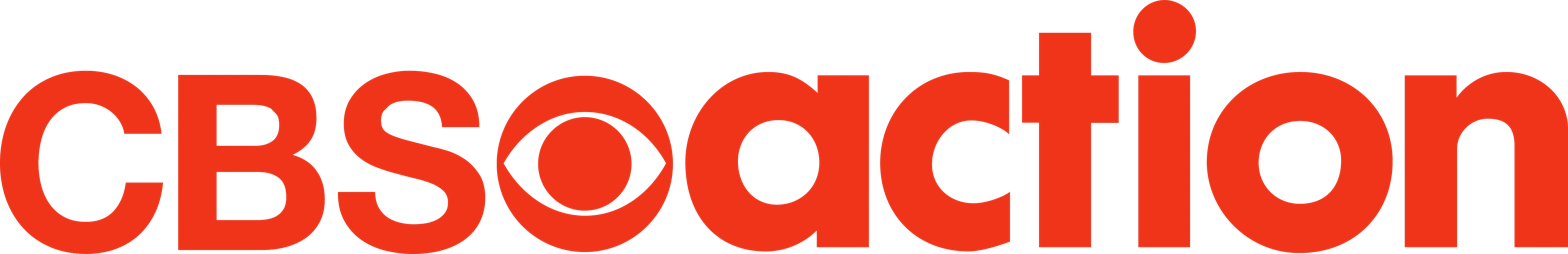
- Broadcast area: Poland

Programming
- Picture format: 576i (SDTV 16:9)

Ownership
- Owner: Paramount Networks EMEAA; AMC Networks International
- Sister channels: AMC; CBS Europa; CBS Reality; Extreme Sports Channel; JimJam

History
- Launched: 3 December 2012; 13 years ago
- Replaced: Zone Romantica (1998-2012)
- Closed: 31 December 2019; 6 years ago

Links
- Website: CBS Action

CBS Action was a Polish pay television channel specialising in action, drama and murder-mysteries programs, launched on 3 December 2012.

On 1 August 2012 Chellomedia revealed that all European versions of the Zone Channels would be rebranded into CBS Channels. CBS Action replaced Zone Romantica in Poland on 3 December 2012.
