= CBS Action =

CBS Action may refer to:

- CBS Justice, a UK TV channel, formerly CBS Action
- CBS Action (Polish TV channel)
