= CBS Paramount =

CBS Paramount may refer to the following:

- CBS Paramount Television (now CBS Studios), a television production and distribution company or any of the following subdivisions:
  - CBS Paramount Domestic Television, formerly the main United States distribution arm
  - CBS Paramount International Television, formerly the main international distribution arm
  - CBS Paramount Network Television, formerly the main production arm

== See also ==
- Paramount Global (formerly ViacomCBS), the parent company of both CBS and Paramount Pictures since 2019
