= AMC (European TV channel) =

European TV channel

- Broadcast area: Balkans; Baltics; Central and Eastern Europe; Iberia; Ireland; Israel; United Kingdom
- Network: AMC Networks International UK; AMC Networks International Central Europe; AMC Networks International Iberia

Programming
- Picture format: 1080i HDTV (downscaled to 16:9 576i for the SDTV feed)

Ownership
- Owner: AMC Networks International
- Sister channels: Film Cafe; CBS Reality; Extreme Sports Channel; JimJam; Minimax; Legend; Outdoor Channel; RealityXtra; RealityXtra2; Sundance TV

History
- Launched: 4 November 2014; 11 years ago (Portugal and Spain); 28 August 2015; 10 years ago (United Kingdom); 6 May 2016; 10 years ago (Poland); 21 February 2023; 3 years ago (Ireland)
- Replaced: MGM Channel
- Closed: 31 December 2018; 7 years ago (Netherlands and Flanders); 1 January 2019; 7 years ago (Russia); 28 September 2023; 2 years ago (United Kingdom); 31 July 2024; 23 months ago (Ireland)
- Replaced by: Hollywood (Russia only)

Links
- Website: AMC Poland; AMC Portugal; AMC Spain; AMC UK

AMC is a European TV channel launched by AMC Networks International. AMC replaced the MGM Channel in Portugal and Spain on 4 November 2014, and in Poland on 6 May 2016. AMC-produced dramas Halt & Catch Fire and The Divide are among the first original series that premiered on the channel. The channel also airs films from MGM, Universal Studios, Paramount Pictures, Warner Bros. Pictures, Walt Disney Pictures, 20th Century Studios and Sony Pictures Entertainment. The channel launched in the United Kingdom on 28 August 2015, in partnership with BT TV and branded AMC from BT. Until 2019, Sky customers in the UK had access to the channel if they subscribed to BT Sport, but was subsequently removed from the platform on 2 October 2019, making the channel exclusive to BT TV subscribers.

== History ==
The channel launched in Ireland on 21 February 2023 on Virgin Media Ireland. It was removed from the service on 30–31 July 2024.

AMC closed in the Netherlands and Flanders on 31 December 2018 and in Russia on 1 January 2019, where it was replaced by Hollywood channel.

On 17 August 2023, it was announced that the AMC UK channel and all on-demand content would be removed from BT TV on 28 September 2023, ending AMC's presence in the UK.
