= True Crime (AMC Networks) =

British free-to-air television channel

- Logo used since 2023
- Country: United Kingdom

Programming
- Language: English
- Picture format: 576i 16:9 SDTV
- Timeshift service: True Crime +1

Ownership
- Owner: AMC Networks International; Paramount Networks UK & Australia
- Parent: CBS AMC Networks UK Channels Partnership
- Sister channels: Legend; Legend Xtra; True Crime Xtra

History
- Launched: 10 October 2002; 23 years ago
- Replaced: CBS Reality
- Former names: Reality TV (2002–2006); Zone Reality (2006–2009); CBS Reality (2009–2023)

Links
- Website: True Crime UK

Availability

Terrestrial
- See separate section

Streaming media
- Official catch-up service: Watch Free UK

True Crime (stylised as TRUE CRIME, formerly known as Reality TV, Zone Reality and CBS Reality) is a British free-to-air television channel. It is the successor to CBS Reality in the United Kingdom and Ireland.

== History ==
Reality TV launched in the United Kingdom and Ireland on Sky Digital on 10 October 2002. A timeshift network called Reality TV +1 was launched on January 31, 2005, while an additional channel called Reality Extra was launched in February 2006.

With the rebranding of UPC's channels under the "Zone" brand, the channels were rebranded in the UK on June 26, 2006, as with the rest of Europe, with the channels rebranding as Zone Reality, Zone Reality +1 and Zone Reality Extra, respectively. On 20 June 2008, Chello Zone announced that Zone Reality Extra would close and its broadcast capacity would be replaced with Zone Horror +1 on 1 July, with Zone Thriller moving into its EPG slot.

On 14 September 2009, it was revealed that CBS Studios International had struck a joint venture deal with Chellomedia to launch six CBS-branded channels in the UK and Ireland during 2009. On 16 November 2009, the channel rebranded as CBS Reality and CBS Reality +1.

As of 2 April 2014, CBS Reality is available on Freeview and Freesat in the United Kingdom. A timeshift channel, CBS Reality +1, was available on YouView as of 27 July 2014, but was removed on 2 June 2015. In Ireland, the channels are available on Sky Ireland.

In addition to their slot on Freeview Channel 66, a number of CBS Reality shows can be found simulcast daily on various Local Television channels in the UK, such as Local TV Liverpool (Freeview channel 7).

On 30 June 2022, the British arm of the AMC-Paramount partnership revised their channel line-up with nearly all CBS branding being dropped and a new channel called Legend taking CBS Justice's slot on a number of services and Horror's programming.

On 22 November 2023, CBS Reality was renamed True Crime, dropping the CBS brand after 14 years in the UK. The European CBS Reality network is not a part of the rebrand and retains its name.

== Logos ==
Zone Reality (2006–2009)

CBS Reality (2013-2017)

CBS Reality (2017-2023)

== See also ==
- Paramount International Networks
- AMC Networks International
