= AMC (Asian TV channel) =

Asian TV channel (excluding Malaysia and Vietnam)

- AMC logo
- Country: Asia (except Malaysia and Vietnam)
- Broadcast area: Hong Kong, Macau, Singapore, Philippines, Thailand, Indonesia and Taiwan
- Network: AMC Networks International - Asia-Pacific
- Headquarters: Singapore

Programming
- Languages: English, Thai
- Picture format: 16:9 576i (SDTV); 1080i (HDTV)

Ownership
- Owner: AMC Networks International

History
- Launched: January 1, 2015
- Replaced: MGM Channel
- Closed: December 31, 2018 (except Taiwan)

Links
- Website: AMC Asia archive AMC Taiwan

AMC was an Asian TV channel (excluding Malaysia and Vietnam) launched by AMC Networks International. AMC replaced the MGM Channel on January 1, 2015. AMC produced dramas Halt & Catch Fire, The Divide, Fear the Walking Dead, Into the Badlands, The Night Manager were among the first original series that premiered on the channel. The channel also airs movies from MGM, Paramount Pictures, Walt Disney Pictures and Sony Pictures Entertainment.

The channel ceased broadcasting on December 31, 2018, at 00:00 hours. Meanwhile, the operation rights in Taiwan were handed over to Ulight Entertainment Technology. Its web page is referring to UMG Movie as its name, but the channel is still named AMC at the moment.

== Final Programming ==
- 4th and Loud
- Babylon
- Eli Roth's History of Horror
- Fear the Walking Dead
- Game of Arms
- Halt and Catch Fire
- Hap and Leonard
- Hell on Wheels
- Hollywood's Best Film Directors
- Humans
- Into the Badlands
- Jack Irish
- The Code
- The Divide
- The Night Manager
- The Terror
