= Skydance Global Content Sales =

Global TV distribution arm of Paramount Global

- Formerly: List: Desilu International (1962–1968); Paramount Television International (1968–1988); CBS Broadcast International (1981–1984, 1986–2007); CBS Productions (1984–1986); Paramount International Television (1988–2004); CBS Paramount International Television (2004–2009); CBS Global Distribution Group (2006–2019); CBS Studios International (2009–2020); ViacomCBS Global Distribution Group (2019–2022); Paramount Global Content Licensing (2022); Paramount Global Content Distribution (2022–2026)
- Type: Division
- Industry: Television distribution
- Founded: 1962; 64 years ago
- Headquarters: Santa Monica, California; New York City, New York
- Key people: David Decker (president); Nitin Chawla (EVP and CFO)
- Products: Television shows; Television films; Miniseries
- Owner: Desilu Productions (1962–1968); Gulf and Western Industries (1966–1989); Paramount Communications (1989–1994); Viacom (1994–2005); CBS Corporation (2005–2019); Paramount Global (2019–2025) (Note: Known as ViacomCBS from 2019 to 2022.); Skydance (2025–present) (Note: Known as Paramount Skydance from 2025 to 2026.)
- Website: Official website

Skydance Global Content Sales is an international television distribution arm of American media conglomerate Skydance originally established in 1962 as the international distribution division of Desilu Productions. With the sale of Desilu to Gulf+Western, then-owners of film studio Paramount Pictures, in 1968, the division evolved into Paramount's first foray into the international television industry in the 1970s.

The division handles the distribution of television content from the libraries of Paramount Media Networks, Paramount Television Studios, CBS Studios, Warner Bros. Television, HBO Max and Paramount+.

== History ==
=== Desilu International/Paramount Television International/Paramount International Television (1962–2006) ===
The division as well as Paramount International Television was originally established in 1962 as the international distribution division of Desilu Productions, Desilu International, which was managed by Bruce Gordon. The company co-produced The Lost Islands with the Ten Network (now Network 10) in 1975. Network 10 and this division have been in common ownership since 2019 after the ViacomCBS re-merger. In 1983, it acquired distribution rights to the Australian miniseries, Return to Eden.

In 1967, Desilu was sold to Gulf+Western, the then-owners of the film studio Paramount Pictures, adding international television to its well-known film operations. Gulf+Western rebranded the division as Paramount Television International to handle international sales of Desilu/Paramount properties from Paramount Television. The following year, John Pearson, who had run Desilu/Paramount's international operations, was fired. He proceeded to form his own company, John Pearson International, whose purpose was continue distributing the sitcom Here's Lucy for the international market.

In 1987, the company, along with MCA TV International, signed an agreement with China Central Television (CCTV), to offer a total of 100 drama hours. The deal, the largest license ever granted to Chinese television in that era, made the two Hollywood studios the largest suppliers of foreign production for that country. In 1990, it briefly considered an investment in Australia's Nine Network.

In 1986, Paramount Television International formed a partnership that would exploit the rights to the Madison Square Garden properties. In 1995, Paramount International Television launched a joint venture to be headed by Peter Press. In 1998, James Dowaliby was tapped to be vice president of production and Christopher Ottinger was named vice president of business development at the division. Later that year, Paramount announced plans to enter international co-production.

In 2000, the division was touted to develop and co-produce Jeremiah with Lions Gate Television, but was replaced by MGM Television.

=== CBS Broadcast International (1981–2007) ===
In 1981, CBS launched its international division, CBS Broadcast International, to sell news, sports and entertainment programming produced in-house to foreign markets as well as non-broadcast and new technology markets in the United States. It eventually merged into CBS Worldwide Enterprises and later incorporated into its marketing unit CBS Productions (unrelated to the later company of the same name) with CBS Theatrical Films in August 1984. In the summer of 1985, CBS Productions, CBS News and Columbia House partnered to produce a videocassette The Vietnam War with Walter Cronkite.

Later that year, CBS shut down its theatrical production unit and CBS Broadcast International spun-out from the production unit, restoring the CBS Broadcast International moniker in the process. In 1985, it sold a package of its productions to China Central Television, in an attempt at introducing TV series and sports from the western world, as Chinese television had limited international content at the time. It planned to provide the CBS Evening News bulletins to UK-based British Satellite Broadcasting in 1988.

CBS Broadcast International produced syndicated episodes of the television series, The Twilight Zone in 1985. It then signed a partnership agreement with MGM/UA Telecommunications 2 years later to syndicate its episodes from all 2 seasons with 30 new first-run episodes to form a 90-episode syndication package. On 28 October that same year, CBS Broadcast International announced its acquisition of television and ancillary market rights to four Academy Award/Oscar-winning films produced by Arthur Cohn such as Dangerous Moves, Black and White in Color, The Garden of the Finzi Continis and The Sky Above, The Mud Below. It also announced plans to pick up the bulletins of CBS Evening News with Dan Rather which would place it on a tape-delayed basis on international channel Tele Monte Carlo.

CBS Broadcast International launched a global programming alliance with Virgin Media Television in 1997. That following year, Stephanie Pacheco was named the managing director of international sales of the division.

=== CBS Paramount International Television (2004–2009) ===
CBS Broadcast International and Paramount International Television merged on August 11, 2004 to create CBS Paramount International Television and would be headed by Armando Nuarez Jr. The division was transferred to CBS Corporation when CBS spun off from Viacom on January 1, 2006, with television rights to the films from its sister company, Paramount Pictures, obtained by Trifecta Entertainment and Media. With the December 4, 2019 merger of CBS and Viacom, the television rights to Paramount's films were brought back to the now-combined Paramount Global. The company distributes television content from the libraries of CBS Studios, the King World Productions and certain HBO shows internationally the Rysher Entertainment library, the latter owned domestically by 2929 Entertainment.

=== CBS Studios International (2009–2019) ===
CBS Studios International logo (2009-2020)

In May 2009, CPITV was renamed CBS Studios International. On 14 September that year, CBS Studios International struck a joint venture deal with Chellomedia to launch six CBS-branded channels in the UK which would replace Zone Romantica, Zone Thriller, Zone Horror and Zone Reality, plus timeshift services Zone Horror +1 and Zone Reality +1. The replacement channels launched on 16 November that year. On 5 April 2010, Zone Horror and Zone Horror +1 were rebranded as Horror Channel and Horror Channel +1 respectively.

CBS Studios International licensed rights for the top international formats. In 2010, CBS Studios International went into an equal joint venture with Reliance Broadcast Network Limited to form Big CBS Networks Pvt. Ltd. At the time, the network operated 3 main channels; Big CBS Prime, a general entertainment channel, Big CBS Spark, a youth-oriented channel and Big CBS Love, a women's and urban couple-oriented channel.

In January 2011, CBS Studios International partnered with Australian company, Ten Network Holdings, to launch digital free-to-air channel known as Eleven and would hold a 33% stake in its joint-venture holding company, ElevenCo. Ten Network Holdings entered voluntary administration in June 2017 which ultimately led to CBS acquiring the entirety of the company that November.

On 1 August 2012, Chellomedia revealed that the European versions of Zone Romantica, Zone Reality and Club would be rebranded respectively as CBS Drama, CBS Reality and CBS Action.

=== ViacomCBS Global Distribution Group/Paramount Global Content Distribution (2019–2026) ===
ViacomCBS Global Distribution Group logo (2020–2022)

Paramount Global Content Distribution logo (2022–2026)

Following the December 4, 2019 merger of CBS and Viacom to create ViacomCBS, CBS Studios International and Paramount Worldwide Television Licensing & Distribution merged and rebranded to ViacomCBS Global Distribution Group. On February 16, 2022, ViacomCBS rebranded as Paramount Global, rebranding the division likewise to Paramount Global Content Distribution and restoring the "Paramount" name in television for the first time in 16 years. ViacomCBS International Studios was folded into the company later in 2022.

=== Skydance Global Content Sales (2026–present) ===
In 2026, Paramount Skydance acquired Warner Bros. Discovery and rebranded as Skydance, rebranding the division likewise to Skydance Global Content Sales.

== Past activities ==
As CBS Paramount International Television, the division distributed films/movies from the libraries of Paramount Pictures and the Republic Pictures between 2006 and 2009, as well as DreamWorks Pictures from 2006 to 2008.

As CBS Studios International, the division had 50% ownership of former Australian pay-TV channels, TV1 and SF Channel. In 2013, RTL Group and CBS Studios International announced a joint venture called RTL CBS Asia Entertainment Network for Southeast Asia with the launch of RTL CBS Entertainment in September that year, but would be acquired 5 years later in January by Blue Ant Media.

The division previously owned all CBS-branded European TV channels (until rebranded in 2025) in a joint venture with AMC Networks International and an Australian television company, Ten Network Holdings. Both have since been transferred to the primary international networks division of Paramount Global/Skydance.

== See also ==
- CBS Studios
  - Paramount Television Studios
- MTV Entertainment Studios
- Nickelodeon Group
- Warner Bros. Television Studios
  - Williams Street
