= MGM Channel (European TV channel) =

- Country: Netherlands
- Broadcast area: Balkans; Benelux; Eastern Europe; Iberia; Israel

Programming
- Picture format: 4:3/16:9 576i (SDTV); 1080i (HDTV); 16:9 576i (Video-on-demand)

Ownership
- Owner: MGM Networks (2001–2012); Chellomedia (2012–2014); AMC Networks International (2014)

History
- Launched: 2001; 24 years ago
- Closed: 5 November 2014; 10 years ago
- Replaced by: AMC

Links
- Website: MGM Netherlands; Canal MGM Spain

MGM Channel, sometimes called just MGM and in Spain Canal MGM, was a European 24-hour film channel that was launched by Metro-Goldwyn-Mayer Studios in Germany in 2001, later followed by other European countries. The programming of the channel mainly consisted of movies from MGM's library comprising approximately 4,000 titles, including West Side Story, The Adventures of Priscilla, Queen of the Desert, Madhouse, The Manchurian Candidate, 12 Angry Men, amongst many others. The main language was in English and the films were locally subtitled or dubbed. Some cable operators did offer MGM video on demand.

The European version has been operated by Chello Zone and was fully owned by Chellomedia since 2012. Only the German version of the MGM Channel is still owned by MGM. AMC Networks acquired Chellomedia on 2 February 2014. Chellomedia was rebranded by AMC Networks International on 8 July 2014.

The channel rebranded as AMC on 5 November 2014.
