= Legend (TV channel) =

British free-to-air television channel

- Broadcast area: United Kingdom; Ireland

Programming
- Picture format: 576i 16:9 SDTV
- Timeshift service: Horror Channel +1 (2010–2022)

Ownership
- Owner: AMC Networks International; Paramount Networks UK & Australia
- Parent: CBS AMC Networks UK Channels Partnership
- Sister channels: True Crime; True Crime Xtra; Legend Xtra

History
- Launched: 3 May 2004; 22 years ago
- Former names: The Horror Channel (2004–2006); Zone Horror (2006–2010); Horror Channel (2010–2022)

Links
- Website: www.legend-tv.co.uk

Availability

Terrestrial
- Freeview: Channel 41

Streaming media
- Virgin TV Anywhere: Watch live (UK only)
- Official catch-up service: Watch Free UK (UK only)

Legend, formerly Zone Horror and Horror Channel, is a free-to-air television channel specialising in sci-fi, fantasy, thriller, and action series, broadcasting in the UK and Ireland.

== Horror Channel ==
Launching in 2004, the Horror Channel went into administration within months and was acquired by Zone Vision Networks Ltd., which renamed the channel "Zone Horror" in 2006.

Zone Horror +1 launched on Sky in 2008, replacing Zone Reality Extra. Zone Horror was seen in The Netherlands from 2006 to 2009 and in Italy as The Horror Channel from 2011-15.

In 2009, CBS Studios International launched six CBS-branded channels in the UK. These channels replaced Zone Romantica, Zone Thriller, Zone Horror, Zone Reality, and timeshift services Zone Horror +1 and Zone Reality +1. In 2010, Zone Horror was renamed "Horror Channel".

In 2012, a simulcast of Horror Channel was on Sky until 2013, when it was replaced by Reality TV, which was itself a simulcast of CBS Reality. In 2015, Horror Channel appeared on Freeview. In 2022, Horror moved to a higher position on the Freeview guide, by switching positions with CBS Justice.

=== Horror Channel Films ===
Throughout its run as Horror Channel, the network broadcast a wide range of horror, cult, and genre films, including classic British titles, European horror seasons, and occasional themed blocks such as Hammer Horror. Gradually the focus shifted to more recent films.

List of films broadcast by Horror Channel.

== Legend ==
On 30 June 2022, Horror was rebranded Legend with a schedule of sci-fi, fantasy, thriller, and action movies and TV series. On most platforms it took the slot vacated by CBS Justice.

== Logos ==
Logos of Horror Channel
Logo used 2004–2006

Logo used 2006–2010

Logo used 2010–2022

Logo used 2022–2023

== Legend Xtra ==

Legend Xtra (styled as LEGEND XTRA and formerly HorrorXtra) is a British free-to-air television channel. HorrorXtra launched as a spin-off channel to Legend on 1 July 2022, retaining the "Horror" branding used prior to Legend's rebrand. At launch it was carried on cable and satellite platforms but was not seen on Freeview until April 2023, when it replaced the short-lived placeholder service, RealityXtra 2. Initially a movie channel, after rebranding as Legend Xtra in November 2023, it airs a mix of television series and films across the action, science fiction, and horror genres. In 2024, the broadcast hours were expanded to a full 24-hour schedule.
