= CBS Justice =

TV channel active in Africa and Ireland and formerly in the UK

- Broadcast area: Europe; Africa

Programming
- Picture format: 576i 16:9 SDTV
- Timeshift service: CBS Justice +1

Ownership
- Owner: Paramount Networks UK & Australia (British feed); Paramount Networks EMEAA (Africa feed); AMC Networks International
- Sister channels: AMC; CBS Reality; True Crime Xtra; Legend; HorrorXtra; Extreme Sports Channel

History
- Launched: 16 November 2009; 16 years ago (British version); 21 November 2019; 6 years ago (Africa)
- Replaced: Zone Thriller (2009)
- Closed: 30 June 2022; 4 years ago (British version); 31 December 2025; 9 months ago (African version)
- Former names: CBS Action (2009–2018)

Links
- Website: CBS Justice (UK, archived); CBS Justice (Africa, archived)

Availability

Terrestrial
- Freeview (UK): Channel 41

Streaming media
- Virgin TV Go: Watch live (UK only)

CBS Justice, formerly CBS Action, was a television channel specializing in factual programming ranging from action films to drama and murder-mysteries. It was previously available free-to-air in the UK from 16 November 2009 to 30 June 2022 and in Africa from 21 November 2019 to 31 December 2025.

== History ==
On 14 September 2009, CBS Studios International (now Paramount Global Content Distribution) struck a joint venture deal with Chellomedia (now AMC Networks International) to launch six CBS-branded channels in the UK during 2009. The channels would replace Zone Romantica, Zone Thriller, Zone Horror and Zone Reality (now CBS Reality), plus timeshift services Zone Horror +1 and Zone Reality +1. CBS Reality, CBS Reality +1, CBS Drama and CBS Action launched and replaced Zone Reality, Zone Reality +1, Zone Romantica and Zone Thriller on 16 November 2009. On 5 April 2010, Zone Horror and Zone Horror +1 were respectively rebranded as Horror Channel and Horror Channel +1, following the rebrand of the portfolio's other three channels in November 2009.

CBS Reality launched on Freeview on 1 April 2014 and as of that July, CBS Reality +1, CBS Action, CBS Drama and Horror Channel are available on the YouView platform as part of TalkTalk TV's "Entertainment Boost". A placeholder launched on Freeview and YouView on 29 August 2014 for CBS Action on channel 90, in addition to the channel being provided on the YouView TalkTalk platform. The channel started broadcasting on channel 70 on 1 October 2014. Then on 19 February 2015, CBS Action moved from channel 70 to channel 64 on Freeview. On 2 June 2015, it was removed from YouView channel 485. On 15 March 2017, a timeshift version of CBS Action launched on Freeview channel 90. It was affected by the Freeview changes on 2 August 2017, moving to channel 64 and CBS Action to 39. The timeshift version of CBS Action ceased broadcasting on Freeview on 31 January 2018, and was removed from the EPG on 23 April 2018. It returned on 7 January 2020 on DVB-T2 devices as CBS Justice +1 on channel 69, but closed again on 22 June 2020 to make room for COM7 following the closure of COM8.

On 5 December 2018 CBS Action rebranded as CBS Justice.

The channel launched across Africa on satellite pay-TV DStv on 21 November 2019, replacing the African feed of Crime & Investigation.

On 4 November 2020, the channel moved to channel 40 on Freeview as part of a move up where every channel from channel 24 to 54 on the platform moved up one place to allow BBC Four to move to channel 24 in Scotland due to new Ofcom rules regarding certain PSB channels requiring greater prominence on electronic programme guides (EPGs).

On 18 June 2022, CBS Justice announced its closure on all platforms in the UK, with its slot on a number of satellite and cable platforms to be taken by Legend, on 30 June 2022, following the decision by AMC to drop the CBS branding from their channels owned in a joint-venture with Paramount Global.

In November 2025, it was reported that CBS Justice would be closing in Africa on 31 December 2025 alongside CBS Reality.

== Final programming (British version) ==
- Bonanza (Universal Television) (NBC)
- The High Chaparral (Universal Television) (NBC)
- CSI: Miami (CBS Studios) (CBS)
- CSI: NY (CBS Studios) (CBS)
- Diagnosis: Murder (CBS Studios) (CBS)
- Father Dowling Mysteries (CBS Studios) (ABC)
- JAG (CBS Studios) (CBS)
- MacGyver (CBS Studios) (ABC)
- Matlock (CBS Studios) (ABC)
- Mission: Impossible (CBS Studios) (ABC)
- NCIS (CBS Studios) (CBS)
- NCIS: Los Angeles (CBS Studios) (CBS)
- Walker, Texas Ranger (CBS Studios) (CBS)

== Former programming (British version) ==
- The 4400 (now airing on Horror Channel)
- 18 Wheels of Justice
- The A-Team (now on Paramount Network)
- Bad Girls (now on CBS Drama)
- Cops (now airing on TruTV)
- CSI: Crime Scene Investigation
- Diagnosis Murder
- Profit
- Queen of Swords (aspect ratio pan and scan version from 16:9 aspect ratio)
- Adventure Inc. (aspect ratio pan and scan version from 16:9 aspect ratio)
- F/X: The Series
- Gunsmoke (seasons 7–18) (now on CBS Drama)
- Hawaii Five-O
- In Deep
- Jake 2.0
- Knight Rider (now on Paramount Network)
- La Femme Nikita
- Mission: Impossible (1988 TV series)
- Star Trek: Deep Space Nine (now on Horror Channel)
- Star Trek: The Next Generation (now on Horror Channel)
- Star Trek: The Original Series (now on Horror Channel)
- Star Trek: Voyager (now on Horror Channel)
- Wonder Woman (now on Horror Channel)
- Lois and Clark The New Adventures of Superman (now on Horror Channel)
- The Pretender
- The Sentinel
- Suspicious Agenda
- To Serve and Protect
- Jake and the Fatman
- The Twilight Zone
- Thunder in Paradise
- Ultimate Force

== See also ==
- CBS Reality
- CBS Drama
- CBS Europa
- Paramount International Networks
- AMC Networks International
- Rock Action
- Rock Entertainment
