= True Crime Xtra =

British free-to-air television channel

- Logo used since 2023
- Broadcast area: United Kingdom

Programming
- Picture format: 576i 16:9 SDTV

Ownership
- Owner: AMC Networks International; Paramount Networks UK & Australia
- Parent: CBS AMC Networks UK Channels Partnership
- Sister channels: True Crime; Legend; Legend Xtra

History
- Launched: 16 November 2009; 16 years ago
- Replaced: Zone Romantica (Europe); Zone Club (Poland)
- Former names: CBS Drama (2009–2022); RealityXtra (2022–2023)

Links
- Website: realityxtra.co.uk

Availability

Terrestrial
- Freeview (UK): Channel 68

Streaming media
- Virgin TV Anywhere: Watch live (UK only)

TRUE CRIME XTRA, formerly known as CBS Drama and RealityXtra) is a British free-to-air television channel that centres its programming on American television shows produced by CBS. It is the sister channel of True Crime and is owned in partnership by AMC Networks and Paramount Networks.

== History ==
CBS Drama logo, used until 30 June 2022.

=== CBS Drama ===
On 14 September 2009, it was revealed that the international arm of CBS, CBS Studios International, struck a joint venture deal with Chellomedia to launch six CBS-branded channels in the UK during 2009. The new channels would replace Zone Romantica, Zone Thriller, Zone Horror and Zone Reality, plus timeshift services Zone Horror +1 and Zone Reality +1. On 1 October 2009, it was announced that CBS Reality, CBS Reality +1, CBS Drama and CBS Action would launch on 16 November 2009 replacing Zone Reality, Zone Reality +1, Zone Romantica and Zone Thriller. On 5 April 2010, Zone Horror and Zone Horror +1 were rebranded by Horror Channel and Horror Channel +1, following the rebrand of the portfolio's other three channels in November 2009.

On 1 August 2012 Chellomedia revealed that all European versions of the Zone Channels would be rebranded into CBS Channels. CBS Drama replaced Zone Romantica on 3 December 2012 (in Poland replaced Zone Club).

CBS Reality launched on Freeview on 1 April 2014 followed by CBS Action on 1 October 2014 and as of July 2014, CBS Reality +1, CBS Action, CBS Drama & Horror Channel are available on the YouView platform as part of TalkTalk TV's Entertainment Boost, but were removed from the EPG on 2 June 2015.

CBS Drama closed in Poland on 31 December 2016 Due To Low Audience. It had broadcast UK shows such as Bad Girls, Waterloo Road and Footballers Wives, American shows such as Dallas, Beverly Hills, 90210, CSI and Knots Landing, as well as Australian shows such as Return To Eden and Bondi Rescue.

=== RealityXtra ===
On 30 June 2022, the British arm of the AMC-Paramount partnership revised its channel line-up with all CBS branding, with the exception of CBS Reality, being dropped and new channel Legend taking CBS Justice's slot and Horror's programming. In the reshuffle, CBS Drama was renamed Reality Xtra, becoming a sister channel to the current (CBS) Reality channel.

RealityXtra logo used until 22 November 2023

With the rebrand and reshuffle of channels, RealityXtra changed frequencies on Freeview and became a limited-reach channel for viewers who could receive the range of Local channels on channel 7 or 8.

=== True Crime Xtra ===
On 22 November 2023, RealityXtra rebranded as True Crime Xtra to be more in-line with the True Crime brand.

== Programming ==
=== Shows broadcast on CBS Drama ===
- Bonanza (Also shown on Spotlight TV)
- CSI: Miami
- CSI: NY
- Dr. Quinn, Medicine Woman
- Dynasty
- ER
- JAG
- Judge Judy
- The Love Boat
- Medium
- Touched by an Angel
- Bad Girls
- Beauty and the Beast
- Beverly Hills, 90210
- Bondi Rescue
- Boston Legal
- Charmed
- Cheers (Seasons 1–4 only) (Now on Channel 4)
- The Colbys
- Cutting It
- Dallas
- Days of Our Lives
- The Division
- Diagnosis: Murder
- Ed
- Falcon Crest
- Footballer's Wives
- Guiding Light
- Hack
- The Jerry Springer Show
- Judge Joe Brown
- Judging Amy
- Keen Eddie
- Knots Landing
- The Last Frontier
- Matlock
- Melrose Place
- Mile High
- Models Inc.
- Moonlighting
- North and South
- Outrageous Fortune
- Party of Five
- Playing the Field
- The Practice
- Return to Eden
- Sex and the City
- Sex, Love & Secrets
- Shogun
- Sunset Beach (Seasons 1 and 2 only)
- The Streets of San Francisco
- Taxi
- That's Life
- The Thorn Birds
- Twin Peaks
- Waterloo Road
- Wheel of Fortune
- The Young and the Restless

== RealityXtra2 ==
RealityXtra2
- Broadcast area: United Kingdom

Programming
- Picture format: 576i 16:9 SDTV

Ownership
- Owner: Paramount Networks UK & Australia; AMC Networks International

History
- Launched: 26 October 2022; 3 years ago
- Closed: 26 April 2023; 3 years ago
- Replaced by: HorrorXtra

Links
- Website: realityxtra.co.uk

Availability

Terrestrial
- Freeview (UK): Channel 69

RealityXtra2 was a short-lived sister channel to RealityXtra exclusively broadcast on Freeview, deemed to be a placeholder channel so AMC Networks could utilize the space for another network. Unlike the main RealityXtra channel, RealityXtra2 is not available on Freesat, Sky and Virgin Media.

The channel launched on 26 October 2022, on Freeview channel 69. with the channel only broadcasting two episodes of Donal MacIntyre's Murder Files from 12:00am until 2:00am. The channel used CBS Justice's on-screen bug from 26 October until 11 November) but with the channel ident used on-air. and eventually changed to the standard RealityXtra bug.

The channel hours were changed to 3:00am to 5:00am by 2023, with the channel showing random episodes of The Fugitive and Written In Blood

On 24 April 2023, it was announced that RealityXtra2 would be replaced with HorrorXtra, and that the channel space would gain full daytime hours in the process. RealityXtra2 closed on 26 April, and HorrorXtra launched on the same day.

=== Programming on RealityXtra2 ===
- Donal MacIntyre's Murder Files
- Written in Blood
- The Real Prime Suspect
- The Fugitive

== See also ==
- CBS Reality
- CBS Justice
- CBS Europa
- Paramount International Networks
- AMC Networks International
- Rock Action
- Rock Entertainment
