= AMC Networks International =

International pay television operational division of AMC Networks

- Formerly: Chellomedia (1998–2014)
- Type: Division
- Industry: Entertainment
- Founded: 1998; 28 years ago
- Headquarters: New York City, New York, U.S. London, England, United Kingdom
- Key people: Eduardo Zulueta (president)
- Products: Television; Motion pictures
- Parent: Liberty Global (1998–2013); AMC Global Media (2013–present)
- Divisions: AMCNI UK; AMCNI Central Europe; AMCNI Southern Europe; AMCNI Latin America; AMCNI DMC
- Website: amcnetworks.com/amc-networks-international/

AMC Networks International is the division of AMC Global Media that operates outside the United States. AMC Networks commissions and distributes TV channels, content and video services. The division's operating companies and business units currently own and operate in joint venture a total of 68 branded TV channels and run a suite of digital, on demand and broadband services in Europe. In aggregate, its channels and feeds reach 382 million homes. AMC Networks International also provide a set of advanced digital services, such as ad sales and broadcast solutions to international channel operators.

The company was originally named Chellomedia and was part of Liberty Global. In 2013, it was sold to AMC Networks (a former subsidiary of Cablevision), and was renamed AMC Networks International.

== History ==
On July 31, 2012, Chellomedia purchased MGM Networks, Inc. from MGM while MGM retaining its United States, Canada, United Kingdom, Germany and joint ventures in Brazil and Australia. Chellomedia has licensed the MGM brand and content to continue on the purchased MGM channels.

On May 21, 2013, it was announced that Liberty Global had put Chellomedia up for sale. Liberty agreed on October 28 to sell Chellomedia to AMC Networks for $1.035B, except for its Benelux unit. The purchase was completed on February 2, 2014.

On July 8, 2014, Chellomedia was renamed AMC Networks International. In November, AMC Networks renamed the European MGM Channel to AMC.

== Business units ==
AMC Networks International runs its businesses through four business units:

- AMC Networks International UK (EMEA)
- AMC Networks International Central Europe
- AMC Networks International Latin America
- AMC Networks International Southern Europe

== Current channels ==
- AMC (European TV channel)
- AMC (Latin America)
- AMC Break (Spain & Portugal)
- AMC Crime (Spain & Portugal)
- AMC Series (Latin America)
- Biggs (co-owned with NOS)
- Blast
- Blaze (co-owned with A+E Networks UK)
- Canal Cocina
- History (European TV channel) (co-owned with A+E Networks UK)
- Canal Hollywood (co-owned with NOS)
- Canal Panda Portugal (co-owned with NOS)
- Legend and True Crime (co-owned with Paramount Networks UK & Australia)
  - Legend
  - Legend Xtra
  - True Crime
  - True Crime Xtra
- Crime & Investigation (co-owned with A+E Networks UK)
- Dark
- Decasa
- Disney XD Poland (20% owned)
- El Gourmet
- Europa Europa
- Extreme Sports Channel
- Film & Arts
- Film Café
- Film Mania
- JimJam
- Kids TV Russia
- Minimax
- Odisea/Odisseia
- Selekt
- ShortsTV (co-owned with Shorts International)
- Sol Música
- Somos
- Sport 1
- Sport 2
- Sport M
- Spektrum TV
- Spektrum Home
- SundanceTV Spain
- SundanceTV Poland
- TV Paprika
- VinTV
- XTRM
- Zoomoo Asia-Pacific and Latin America (co-owned with Beach House Kids, NHNZ and Rock Entertainment Holdings)
- Outdoor Channel Asia-Pacific and EMEA (joint venture with Kroenke Sports & Entertainment and Rock Entertainment Holdings)

== Former channels ==
- AMC (African and Middle Eastern TV channel)
- AMC (Asian TV channel)
- C8
- CBS Reality
- CBS Justice (Africa)
- CBS Drama (Poland)
- CBS Action
- CBS Europa
- CBS Justice (UK)
- Canal Panda (Spain)
- Horror Channel (Italy)
- Enfamilia
- Eva
- Eva+
- Más Chic
- MOV
- Megamax
- OBN
- SundanceTV Africa
- SundanceTV France
- SundanceTV Middle East
- SundanceTV Latinoamérica

== Logos ==
Logo of Chellomedia until Summer 2014

Logo of AMC Networks International from 2014 till 2021

Current AMC Networks International Since 2021
