= Film Cafe =

Film Cafe Poland
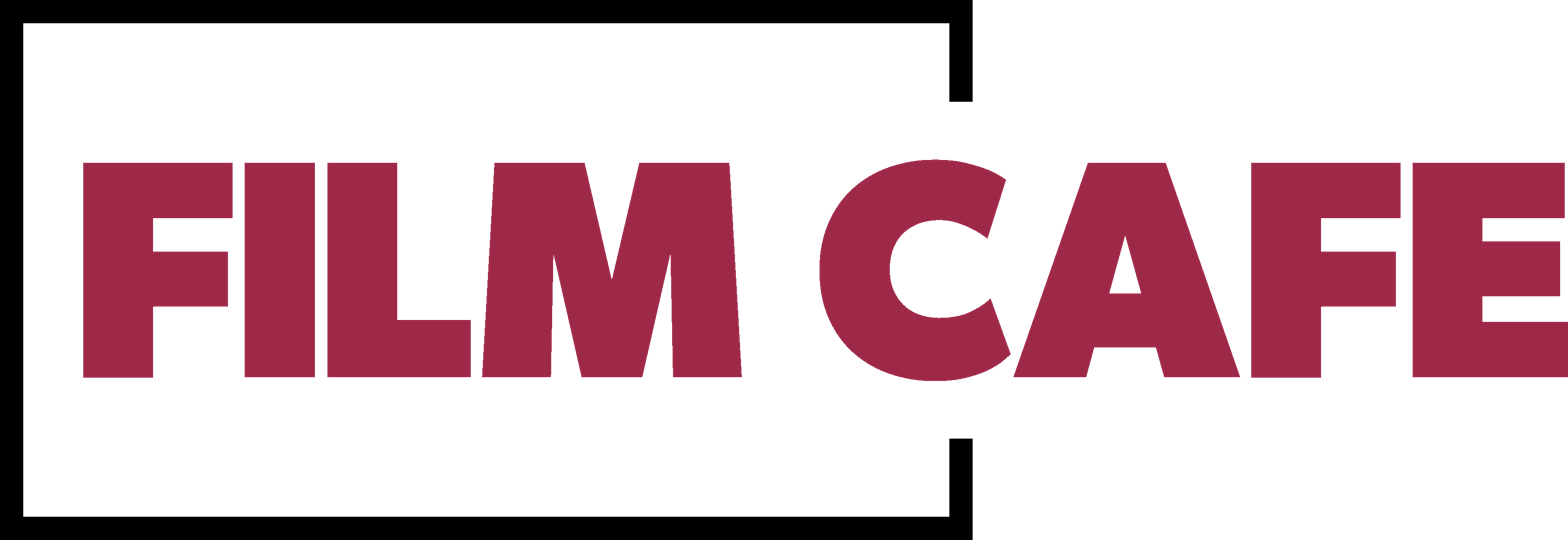
- Country: Poland
- Broadcast area: Poland

Programming
- Languages: Polish; English
- Picture format: 1080i HDTV (downgraded to 16:9 576i for the SDTV feed)

Ownership
- Owner: AMC Networks International; Paramount Networks EMEAA

History
- Launched: 15 March 1999; 27 years ago
- Closed: 31 December 2025; 9 months ago
- Former names: Wizja Le Cinema (1999–2002); Le Cinema (2002–2003); Europa Europa (2003–2006); Zone Europa (2006–2012); CBS Europa (2012–2024)

Film Cafe Poland was a Polish movie channel that originally launched in 1999 as Wizja Le Cinema. In 2003, the channel changed its name to Europa Europa in order to focus on European cinema. In 2006, the channel changed its name again to Zone Europa as part of the Zone channels rebranding. In 2012, the channel changed its name once again to CBS Europa. An HD feed launched on HotBird 13°E on October 1st, 2015. In 2024, the channel rebranded to Film Cafe. The channel ceased broadcasting on January 1st, 2026.

Distributors including Universal Studios, Film4 Productions, the British Film Institute, M6 and Sogepaq contribute the independent productions to the channel.

The channel was originally available in 15 territories across Europe and the Americas to over 6.6 million subscribers. Spanish language content was also available to Comcast On Demand en Español in the United States.

== History ==
A Hungarian version of the channel was launched in 2004, as an expansion of the Polish channel, but it closed on 1 May 2009 because the channel was not popular amongst Hungarian advertisers.

Zone Europa's 14-hour schedule was extended to 20 hours at weekends.

On 1 August 2012 Chellomedia revealed that all European versions of the Zone Channels would be become CBS channels. Zone Europa was renamed CBS Europa on 3 December 2012 in Poland.

On 1 October 2015 CBS Europa HD was launched, replacing the SD version on the satellite.

On 19 June 2024, it was announced that CBS Europa would change its name to Film Cafe by 21 August 2024.

Film Cafe Poland was closed down alongside CBS Reality Poland on December 31, 2025.

== Logos ==
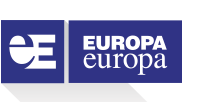
Europa Europa logo from 2003 to 2006

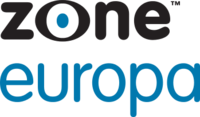
Zone Europa logo from 2006 to 2012

CBS Europa logo from 2012 to 2024

== See also ==
- CBS Reality
- CBS Justice
- CBS Drama
- Paramount International Networks
- AMC Networks International
- Rock Action
- Rock Entertainment
