= CBS Reality =

Defunct documentary television channel

- Country: United Kingdom

Programming
- Languages: English, Polish, Romanian
- Picture format: 1080i HDTV (Poland); 576i 16:9 SDTV

Ownership
- Owner: AMC Networks International; Paramount Networks EMEAA
- Sister channels: Film Cafe (Poland only)

History
- Launched: 1 December 1999; 26 years ago
- Closed: 1 June 2022; 4 years ago (Russia); 23 November 2023; 2 years ago (UK and Ireland, replaced by True Crime); 31 December 2023; 2 years ago (Czech Republic, Slovakia and in the Netherlands); 3 January 2024; 2 years ago (CIS, Baltic, Hungary, Bulgaria and Croatia); 31 December 2025; 7 months ago (Poland, Romania, Middle East and Africa)
- Replaced by: True Crime (UK and Ireland)
- Former names: Reality TV (1999–2006); Zone Reality (2006–2012)

Links
- Website: CBS Reality Europe & Middle East; CBS Reality Poland; CBS Reality Africa; CBS Reality Romania

Availability

Terrestrial
- Unavailable

CBS Reality was an international documentary and reality television brand owned by AMC Networks International and Paramount Networks EMEAA. It launched in 2000 as Reality TV then in 2006 as part of Zone channels rebrand the channel rebranded to Zone Reality and then between 2009 and 2012 the channel renamed to CBS Reality. In 2023 free-to-air UK version rebranded into True Crime. On 1 January 2026, CBS Reality ceased broadcasting worldwide.

In recent years, CBS Reality has significantly reduced its presence across Europe. The channel ceased broadcasting in selected countries, including Portugal (2022), the Netherlands (by 31 December 2023) and parts of Central and Eastern Europe (by 31 December 2023). In the United Kingdom and Ireland, the channel was rebranded as True Crime in November 2023 under the same ownership. Earlier rationalisation outside Europe also included the withdrawal of a Southeast Asia feed (then branded Zone Reality/Reality TV) that operated in the mid-2000s. By the end of 2025, CBS Reality stopped broadcasting in Romania, Poland, the Middle East and Africa.

Programming was centred on true crime and factual entertainment, including police-pursuit and custody series and courtroom shows; the schedule has featured U.S. imports from networks such as truTV/Court TV (Bait Car, Jail) alongside titles like Judge Judy and 48 Hours.

== History ==
CBS Reality was launched as Reality TV on 1 December 1999 as a joint-venture between UPCtv and Zone Vision. The Reality TV channel began broadcasting in Poland on 17 March 2000 on the UPC subsidiary Wizja TV satellite platform. The channel started broadcasting to Africa on 1 November 2001. In 2005, Liberty Global, owner of UPC, bought Zone Vision. In 2006, they decided to put all their channels under the unified "Zone" brand. Reality TV became Zone Reality.

On 1 August 2012, Chellomedia revealed that the European version of Zone Reality would be rebranded into CBS Reality. In Europe, Zone Reality was rebranded on 3 December 2012. AMC Networks acquired Chellomedia on 2 February 2014. Chellomedia was rebranded by the new owner AMC Networks International on 8 July 2014.

CBS Reality is available in HD in Poland since 23 September 2019.

A dedicated Romanian feed was launched on 13 May 2022, with a different schedule and Romanian adverts. However, promos and trailers are subtitled in Romanian.

CBS Reality closed on 1 June 2022 in Russia, and on 1 July 2022 in Portugal.

CBS Reality closed in the UK on 22 November 2023 and was renamed True Crime.

CBS Reality closed on 31 December 2023 in the Czech Republic, Slovakia and in the Netherlands.

CBS Reality closed on 3 January 2024 in Hungary, Bulgaria, Croatia, CIS and Baltic.

CBS Reality closed in Poland, Romania, Middle East and Africa alongside Film Cafe on 31 December 2025.

== Logos ==
Reality TV (2002–2006)

Zone Reality (2006–2012) (UK 2006-2009)

CBS Reality (2012–2017)

== See also ==
- CBS Drama
- CBS Justice
- Paramount International Networks
- AMC Networks International
