= Fordham Preparatory School =

- Divisio Secunda Fordhamensis

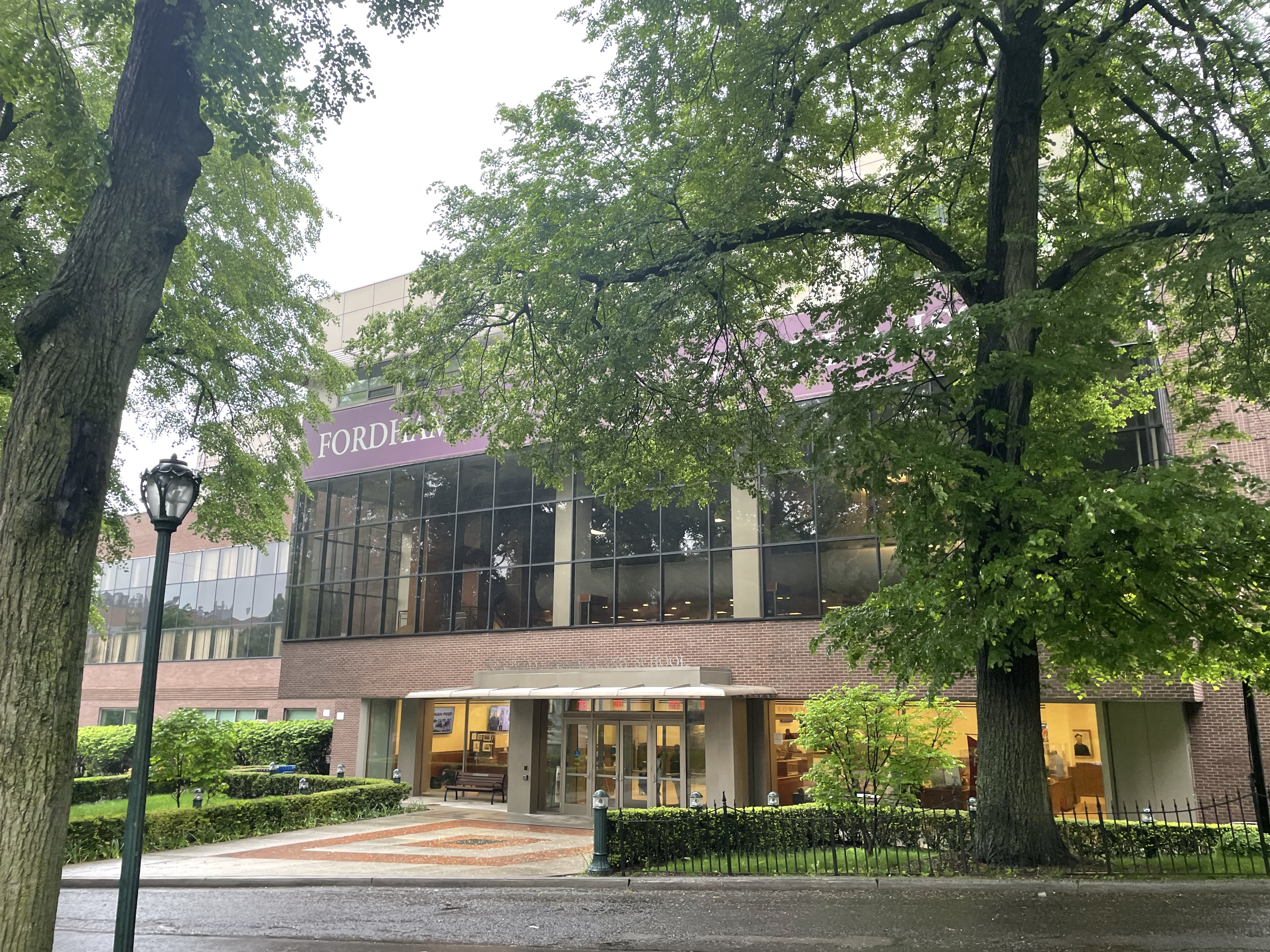
- Shea Hall, the third and current home of Fordham Preparatory School. (2024)

Location
- 441 East Fordham Road; Rose Hill, Bronx; Bronx, New York 10458; United States; 40°51′52″N 73°53′09″W

Information
- Former name: Second Division of St. John's College
- Type: Private secondary college-preparatory school
- Motto: Amor et Conscia Virtus (Love and Conscious Virtue)
- Religious affiliation: Roman Catholic (Society of Jesus)
- Established: 1841 (185 years ago)
- Founder: Archbishop John Joseph Hughes
- President: Mr. Anthony Day
- Dean: Mr. Steven Pettus
- Headmaster: Dr. Joseph A. Petriello '98
- Chaplain: Fr. Jim Coughlin SJ
- Teaching staff: 79
- Grades: 9–12
- Gender: Boys
- Student to teacher ratio: 12:1
- Colors: Maroon and white
- Slogan: Men for others
- Fight song: "The Ram"
- Nickname: Rams
- Rival: Xavier High School; Iona Preparatory School
- Publication: Labyrinth (Literary Magazine) Ramview (Alumni Magazine) Muse (Artistic Journal)
- Newspaper: Rampart
- Yearbook: Ramkin
- Affiliation: Society of Jesus (Jesuits)
- Website: fordhamprep.org
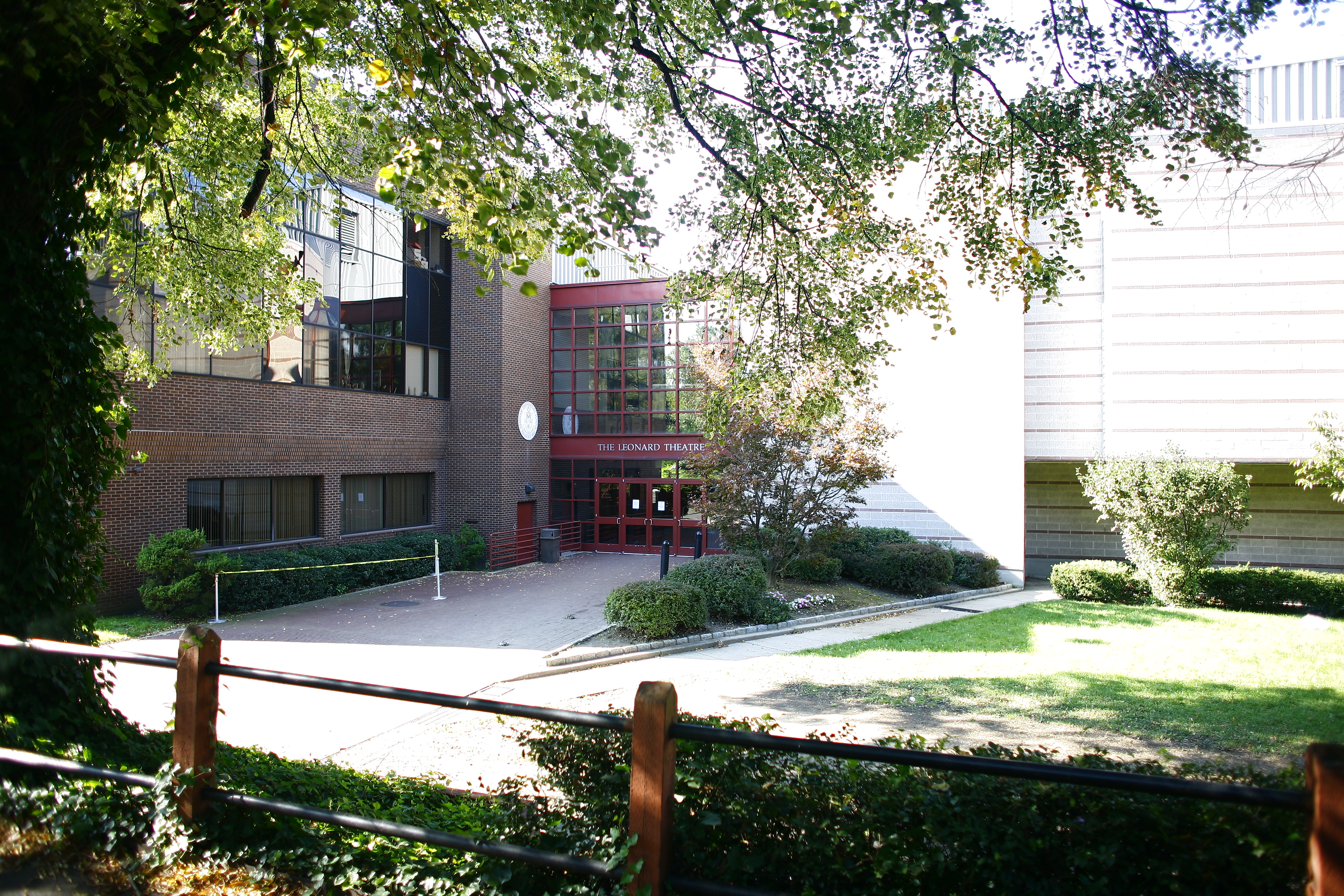
- Entrance to the Leonard Theatre

Fordham Preparatory School (commonly known as Fordham Prep) is an American, independent, boys' college-preparatory school in the Jesuit tradition located on the Rose Hill campus of Fordham University in the Bronx, a borough of New York City.

From its founding in 1841 until 1970, the school was under the direction of Fordham University. In 1970, it separated from the university, establishing itself as an independent preparatory school with its own administration, endowment, and Board of Trustees.

== History ==
Fordham Preparatory School was established in 1841 by bishop John Hughes, later Archbishop of New York, as the Second Division of St. John's College, on the Feast of St. John the Baptist, situated at Rose Hill in what was then known as the village of Fordham, New York.

In 1846, the Society of Jesus was invited to preside over the institution. The Second Division's curriculum consisted of four years of study in Latin, Greek, grammar, literature, history, geography, mathematics, and religion, followed by three years of study in the First Division (equivalent to present-day Fordham University). The degree of Artium Baccalaureus was awarded for completion of both curricula. The Second Division was a boarding school from its founding until 1920 when it ceased boarding operations and assumed its present form as a day school.

St. John's College was re-chartered under its current name of Fordham University in 1907, and the school officially became known as Fordham Preparatory School in 1937, having been unofficially known as "Fordham Prep" for some years prior. In 1970, Fordham Preparatory School formally separated from the university, establishing itself as an independent preparatory school with its own administration, endowment, and Board of Trustees.

=== Hughes Hall to present day ===
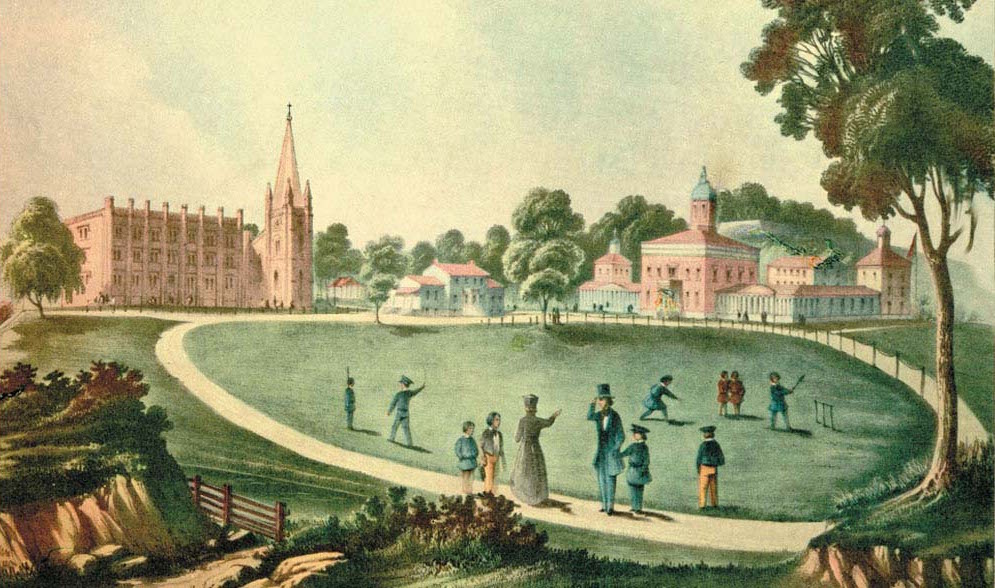
An early campus view showing the University Church and the original school buildings

Fordham Preparatory School was originally housed in a wing of what is today Fordham University's Administration Building, now known as Cunniffe House. That Second Division Wing has long since been demolished. In 1890, the school was relocated to the recently constructed Hughes Hall, originally called Second Division Hall or Junior Hall.

Hughes Hall now houses the Fordham University Gabelli School of Business. After formally separating from the university, the Prep moved to then-new Shea Hall in 1972, erected on what were once fields at the northwestern corner of the campus. Rising construction costs, coupled with the recent separation from the university, brought the Prep into poor financial standing by the early 1970s. Generous donations by alumni, including those of aerosol-valve inventor and 1939 alumnus Robert Abplanalp, and a series of benefit concerts given by entertainers such as Bing Crosby and Bob Hope, were instrumental in funding the expansion to Shea Hall. By the end of the decade, however, the school still remained burdened by the immensity of its debt, which was subsequently reduced after the failure of its mortgage-holder, Franklin National Bank, and a compromise bartered by 1929 alumnus and former Governor of New York Malcolm Wilson.

Maloney Hall, which comprises the Hall of Honor, the Leonard Theater, and the intramural gymnasium and fitness center, was completed in 1991 to form the present iteration of the Prep grounds.

== Academics ==
Fordham Preparatory School instructs students in a classical liberal arts curriculum, in the disciplines of classical languages, English, history, mathematics, modern languages, science, theology, and fine arts. Students either study Latin or Ancient Greek freshman year, after which they may continue or take a modern language such as French, Italian, Mandarin Chinese, or Spanish.

There are twenty-four Advanced Placement courses offered, in addition to a variety of advanced courses in other disciplines. Certain students are also invited to take courses at Fordham University.

=== The Leonard Theatre ===
Constructed in 1991 as part of the Maloney Hall addition, The Leonard Theatre is a one-thousand-seat performing arts venue. It is the home of the Fordham Prep Dramatic Society, which is among the oldest preparatory school theatre companies in the nation. The Leonard Theatre has hosted the MSNBC news program Hardball with Chris Matthews twice, and Irish tenor Ronan Tynan in concert.

== Administration ==
=== Presidents ===
(Since the creation of the position in 1975.)

- Eugene O'Brien, SJ (1975–1980)
- Edward Maloney, SJ (1980–1996)
- Joseph Parkes, SJ (1996–2004)
- Kenneth Boller, SJ (2004–2013)
- Christopher J. Devron, SJ (2013–2022)
- Anthony Day (2023– )

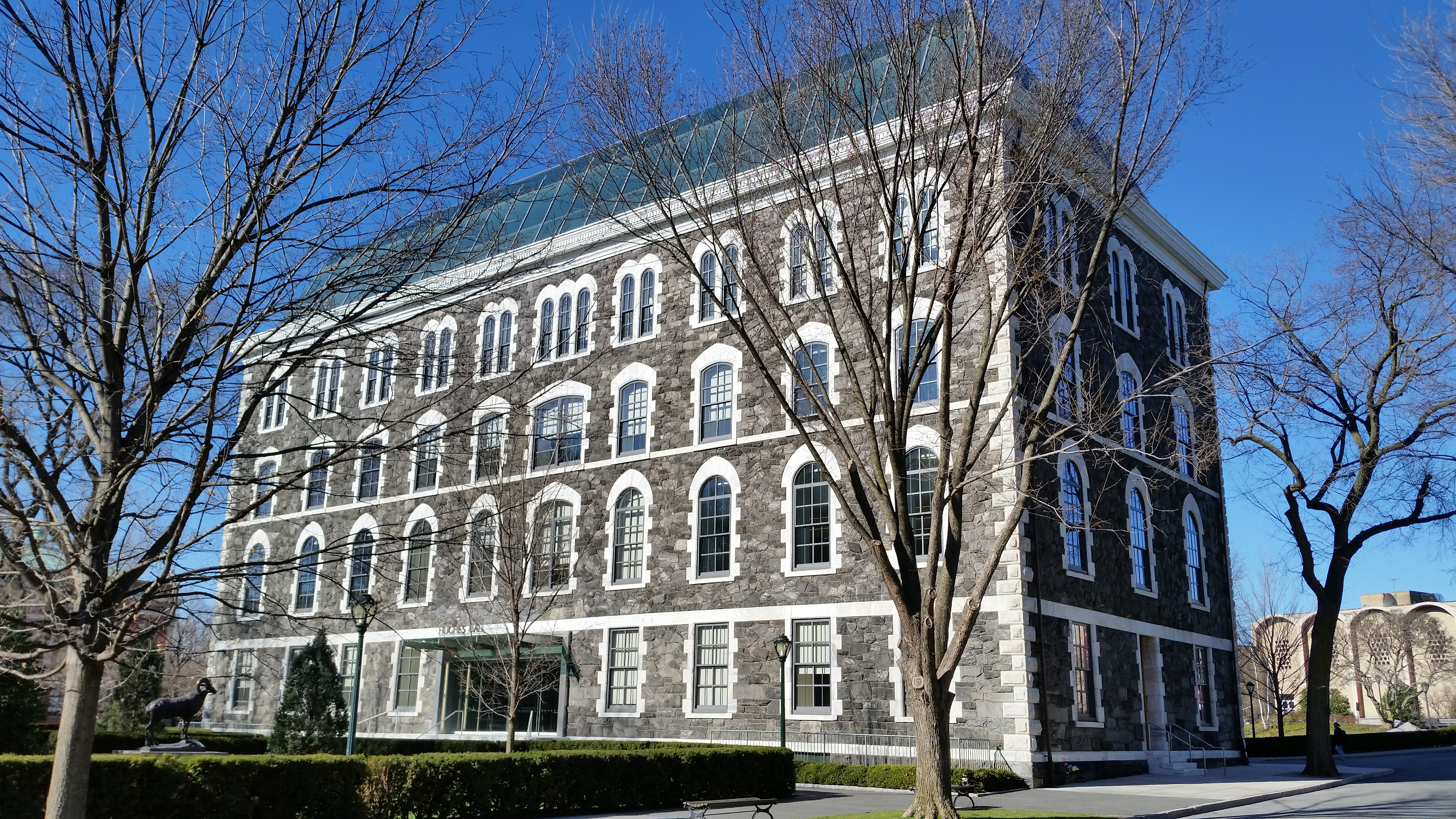
Hughes Hall, the second home of Fordham Preparatory School, from 1890 to 1972.

=== Headmasters/Principals ===
(Since separation from the university in 1970.)

- Eugene O'Brien, SJ (1960–1975)
- Bernard Bouillette, PhD (1975–1982)
- Cornelius F. McCarthy, PhD '53 (1982–1994)
- Robert Gomprecht '65 (1994–2015)
- Joseph Petriello, PhD '98 (2016– )

== Athletics ==
The school has teams that participate in eighteen different sports, with forty teams altogether. The athletic facilities include Fordham Prep's playing fields and running track, the university's adjacent fields and tennis courts, and some other facilities, such as the crew team's boathouse located in nearby New Rochelle.

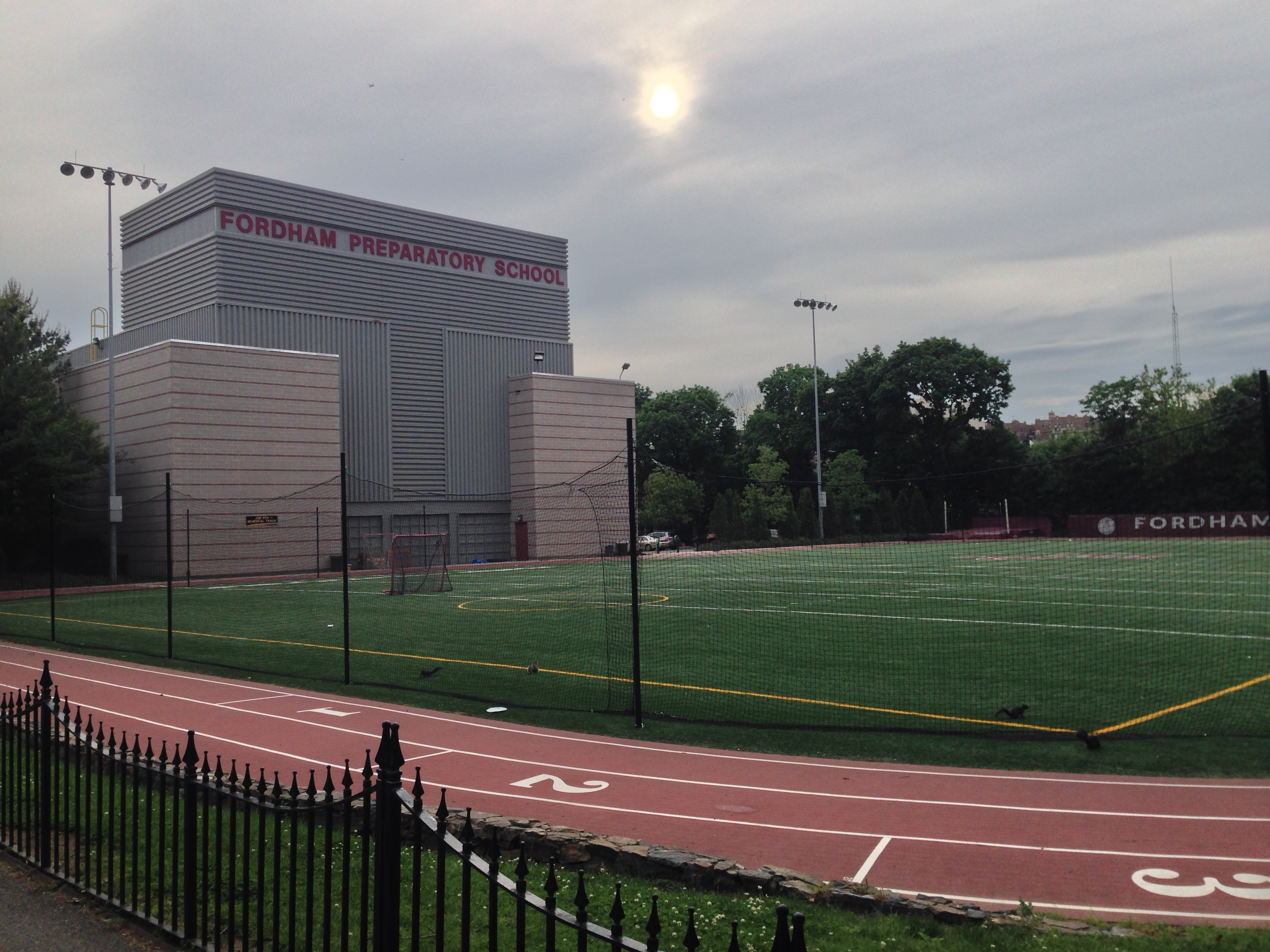
Back view of the Leonard Theater and the Rowen Athletic Field

=== Autumn ===
- Baseball (autumn varsity)
- Bowling (junior varsity, varsity)
- Cross country (freshmen, varsity)
- Football (freshmen, junior varsity, varsity)
- Swimming and diving (freshmen only)
- Soccer (junior varsity, varsity)

=== Winter ===
- Basketball (freshmen, junior varsity, varsity)
- Ice hockey (junior varsity, varsity)
- Squash (varsity)
- Swimming and diving (varsity only)
- Indoor track and field (freshmen, junior varsity, varsity)
- Wrestling (junior varsity, varsity)

=== Spring ===
- Baseball (freshmen, junior varsity, varsity)
- Golf (varsity)
- Lacrosse (junior varsity, varsity)
- Rugby (junior varsity, varsity)
- Tennis (junior varsity, varsity)
- Track and field (freshmen, junior varsity, varsity)
- Volleyball (varsity)

== Notable alumni ==
- Robert Abplanalp (1939) – inventor of the aerosol valve; founder of the Precision Valve Corporation
- Anthony J. Alvarado (1960) - former New York City Schools Chancellor
- Joseph Bastianich (1985) – winemaker; restaurateur; judge on the television series MasterChef
- Emil Bavasi (1932) – baseball executive
- Martin Beck (1918) – former professional football player
- Esteban Bellan (1868) – first Latin American professional baseball player
- Thomas V. Bermingham, S.J. (1936) – scholar, professor at Georgetown University, actor
- Loring M. Black (1903) – lawyer and United States Congressman
- Matthew W. Brennan (1915) – former professional football player
- Thomas Cahill (1948) - historian and author
- John W. Clancy (1905) - judge, United States District Court for the Southern District of New York
- John M. Cunningham (1914) – lawyer and politician
- Lee Curreri (1977) – actor and musician
- Aidan Curry (2020) – professional baseball player
- Arthur Daley (1922) – The New York Times sports columnist; Pulitzer Prize winner for journalism
- Landon Dais (1999) - politician
- Patrick F. Dealy, SJ (1846) – 11th President of Fordham University, 1882–1885
- Ralph DeNunzio (1949) - former chairman, New York Stock Exchange; Kidder, Peabody & Company
- Carmine DeSapio (1927) – Secretary of State of New York 1955–1959; Grand Sachem of Tammany Hall 1954–1961
- William Dickerson (1996) – filmmaker and director
- Joseph J. DioGuardi (1958) – U.S. Congressman
- Jorge I. Domínguez (1963) – scholar and professor, Harvard University
- Joey Fallon (1959) – child actor and New York City politician
- Richard Foerster (1967) – poet
- Pete Fornatale (1963) – disk jockey; music historian
- Frankie Frisch (1916) – Major League Baseball Hall of Famer; known as "The Fordham Flash"
- Mario Gabelli (1961) – CEO and founder of Gabelli Asset Management Company
- Edward J. Glennon (1901) – Bronx County District Attorney and New York State Supreme Court Judge
- Anthony Guida (1959) – television and radio personality
- J. Hunter Guthrie (1917) – Jesuit philosopher; president of Georgetown University
- Robert Hackett (1977) – silver medalist in Swimming at the 1976 Summer Olympics
- John Halligan (1959) – New York Rangers public relations director; NHL executive
- Desmond Harrington (1994) – actor
- John Holland (2006) - professional basketball player
- George Jackson (1976) – film director and producer
- Robert L. James (1953) - former chairman/CEO, McCann-Erickson
- Kenneth Jenkins (1991) - politician; current Westchester County Executive
- Walter P. Kellenberg (1919) – Bishop of Rockville Centre
- James Kerrigan (1846) - U.S. Congressman from New York
- Walter Kinsella (1917) – actor
- Joseph E. Kinsley (1914) – lawyer and politician
- William Kuntz (1968) – United States District Judge for the United States District Court for the Eastern District of New York
- John L. Lahey (1964) – president of Quinnipiac University
- John La Farge (1852) – artist; stained-glass innovator
- John Liscio (1967) – financial analyst and journalist
- Gerald W. Lynch (1954) – former president of John Jay College of Criminal Justice
- Walter A. Lynch (1911) – congressman from 22nd District of New York, 1940–1951; 1950 nominee for Governor of New York
- Juan Tomas Macmanus (1867) – banker, Senator in Mexico from Chihuahua
- Thomas P. Maguire (1965) – Adjutant General of New York
- Francis J. McCaffrey (1935) – lawyer and politician
- Horace McKenna, S.J. (1916) – founder of S.O.M.E. (So Others Might Eat); advocate of the Sursum Corda Cooperative
- Francis McLaughlin (1965) - former head coach, Harvard Crimson men's basketball
- Thomas McLaughlin (1969) – basketball player and coach
- Martin T. McMahon (1855) – Union Army officer, politician, and ambassador to Paraguay
- William R. Meagher (1921) - attorney
- Ryan Meara (2008) – professional soccer player
- Larry Miggins (1943) – former professional baseball player
- John Purroy Mitchel (1894) – 95th Mayor of New York City
- Colman Mockler (1947) – CEO of the Gillette Company, 1975–1991
- Joseph H. Moglia (1967) – CEO of TD Ameritrade
- William J. Moore (1936) – attorney, Fordham University School of Law Dean of Admissions
- Paul Morrissey (1956) - film director
- Edward Murphy Jr. (1856) - U.S. Senator from New York
- John J. Murphy (1925) – New York Yankees pitcher who appeared in eight World Series games
- SSgt. Robert C. Murray (1964) – Medal of Honor recipient
- John J. F. Mulcahy (1891) – Olympic medalist in rowing, politician
- William Hughes Mulligan (1935) - judge, United States Court of Appeals for the Second Circuit
- Rafael Novoa (1985) – former professional baseball player
- Bill O'Donnell (1943) – sports announcer for the Baltimore Orioles
- John Morrison Oliver (1846) - American Civil War general
- Lester W. Patterson (1911) – lawyer, politician, and judge
- Louis A. Perrotta (1920) – surgeon, Metropolitan Opera house physician
- Frank J. Petrilli (1968) – former president and CEO of American Express Centurion Bank
- Vincent Richards (1920) – Olympic medalist in tennis
- Norbert Sander (1960) – physician, runner; founder of the Fort Washington Avenue Armory Foundation
- Ricky Schramm (2003) - professional soccer player
- Vin Scully (1944) – sports announcer for the Los Angeles Dodgers; Ford C. Frick Award honoree; Radio Hall of Fame inductee
- Robert Gould Shaw (ex-1854, did not graduate) – commanding officer of the 54th Massachusetts Regiment, the first all African-American regiment during the American Civil War; portrayed by Matthew Broderick in the 1989 movie Glory
- John Gilmary Shea (1844) - writer and historian
- George Stirnweiss (1936) – professional baseball player for the New York Yankees; American League batting champion in 1945
- David Tubiolo (2005) - Westchester County politician
- Andrew Velazquez (2012) – professional baseball player
- Donnie Walsh (1958) – president of basketball operations for the New York Knicks; former general manager for the Indiana Pacers
- Edward J. Walsh (1908) – lawyer and politician
- James Joseph Walsh (1881) - physician and author
- Ray Walsh (1934) - general manager and vice president, New York Giants
- Malcolm Wilson (1929) – Lieutenant Governor of New York; Governor of New York
- Victor R. Yanitelli, SJ (1933) – former president of Saint Peter's University
- Cameron Young (2015) – professional golfer

=== Notable faculty ===
- Timothy Healy, S.J.; Faculty 1950s
- John Cardinal McCloskey; Rector of Fordham 1841–43
- Martin Joseph Neylon, S.J.; Faculty 1944–46
- William O'Malley, S.J.; Faculty 1986–2012
- Heiner Wilmer, S.C.J.; Faculty 1997–98

=== Notable trustees ===
- J. Peter Grace

== See also ==
- List of Jesuit sites
- List of Jesuit secondary schools
