= Gabelli School of Business =

Business schools of Fordham University

Coordinates: 40.860°N 73.891°W

- Latin: Schola Negotiorum Gabelliana
- Motto: Sapientia et Doctrina (Latin for Wisdom and Learning)
- Type: Private, Independent, Catholic, Jesuit
- Established: 1920
- Parent institution: Fordham University
- President: Tania Tetlow
- Dean: Lerzan Aksoy, Ph.D.
- Faculty: 254 full-time
- Undergraduates: 2,024
- Postgraduates: 1,828
- Location: New York City and West Harrison, New York, USA
- Campus: Lincoln Center (Manhattan): Urban, 8 acres (32,000 m^{2}) Westchester (West Harrison): Suburban, 32 acres, Rose Hill (Bronx) 85 acres
- Colors: Maroon and White
- Mascot: Ram
- Website: fordham.edu/gabelli-school-of-business/

The Gabelli School of Business is the undergraduate and graduate business school of Fordham University, a private Jesuit research university in New York City, New York.

Fordham University's involvement in business started early in the 20th century with the founding of the School of Business in 1920. The Gabelli School of Business has been an AACSB-accredited business school for over 50 years, and is a partner of the CFA Institute. As of March 2015, it incorporated the former Fordham Graduate School of Business.

== History ==
The Gabelli School of Business was established in 1920 in the Financial District of Lower Manhattan, and is now located on Fordham's Rose Hill campus in the Bronx as well as on the Lincoln Center campus in Manhattan. Fordham established itself as a provider of graduate business education in 1969, with the launch of its first master's degree programs at the Lincoln Center campus. The undergraduate and graduate business schools were separate entities until 2001 when the university administration made the decision to unify them under one Dean until 2005 when they were again put under separate leadership. In 2014 the university administration began a yearlong process of unifying them again with a single identity and one dean.

The Graduate School of Business opened in 1969 as part of the redevelopment of Lincoln Center. The Graduate School of Business was part of a consortium offering an MBA at Peking University in Beijing China from 1998 to 2008 and was replaced by Vlerick University. This program, known as BiMBA (Beijing international MBA), was listed by Forbes Magazine as one of the most valuable Chinese programs.

== Campus ==
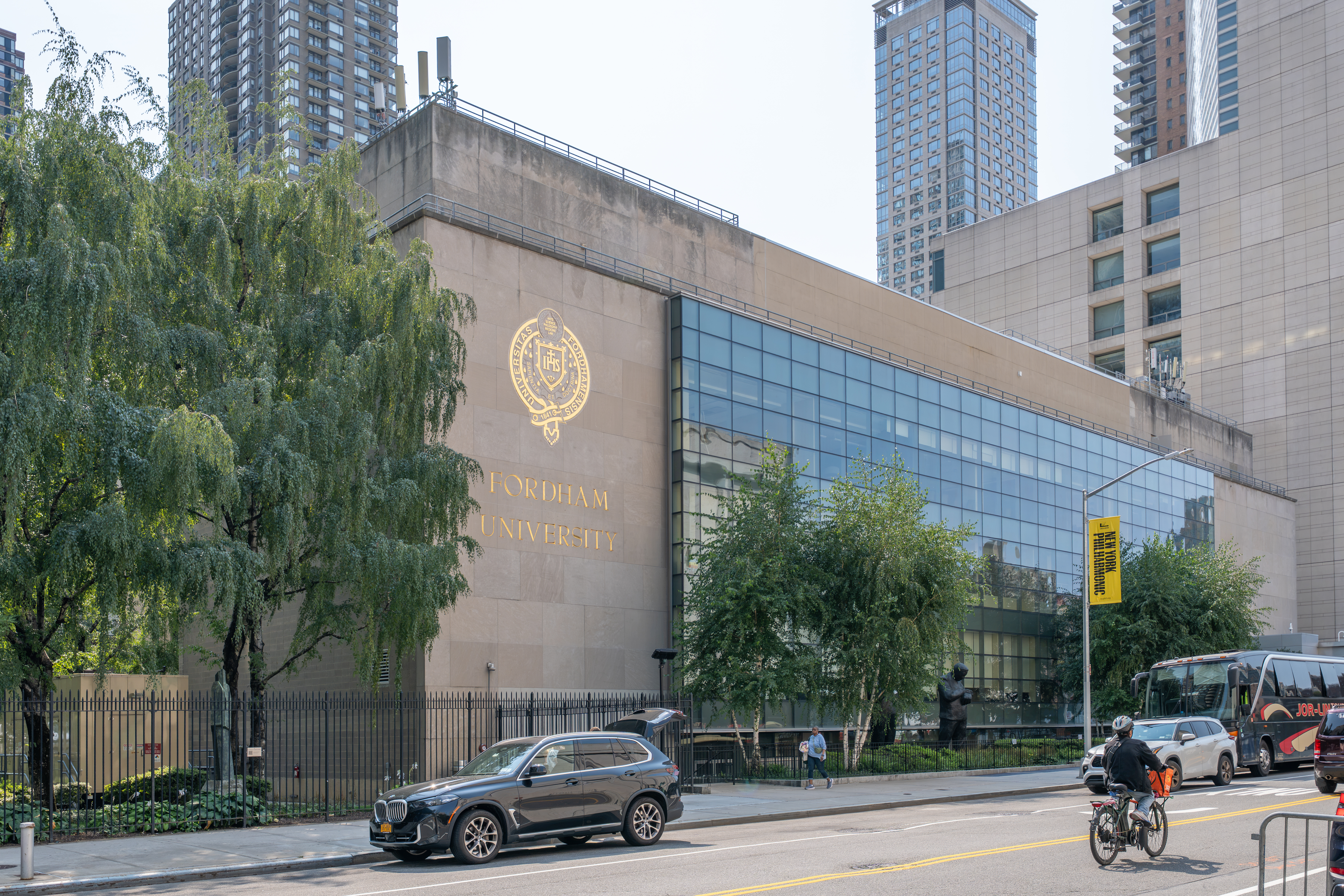
Former Fordham Law School building on Lincoln Center campus, now home to Gabelli School of Business

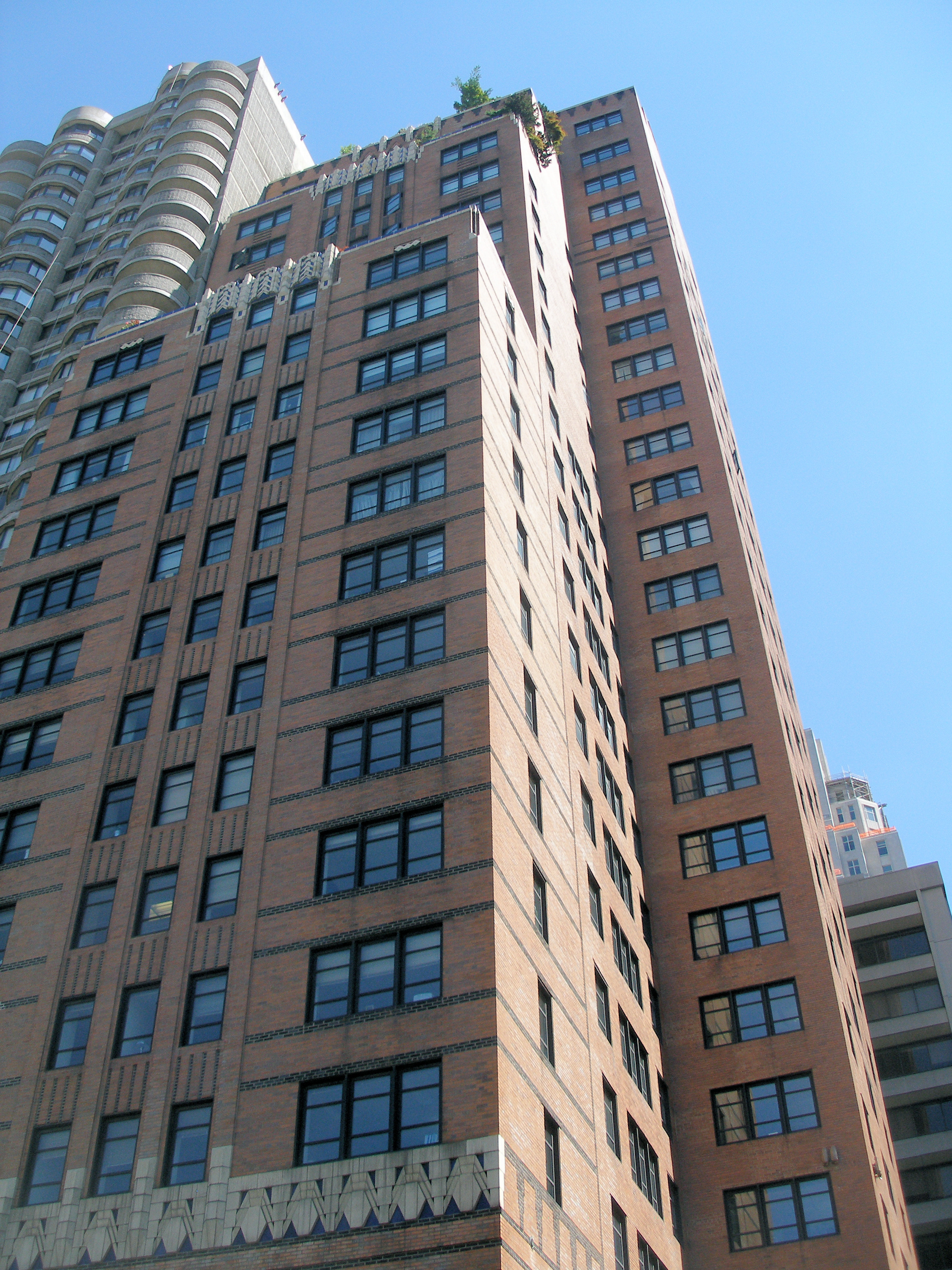
Former College Board headquarters at 45 Columbus Avenue near Lincoln Center campus, now home to professor and administrator offices

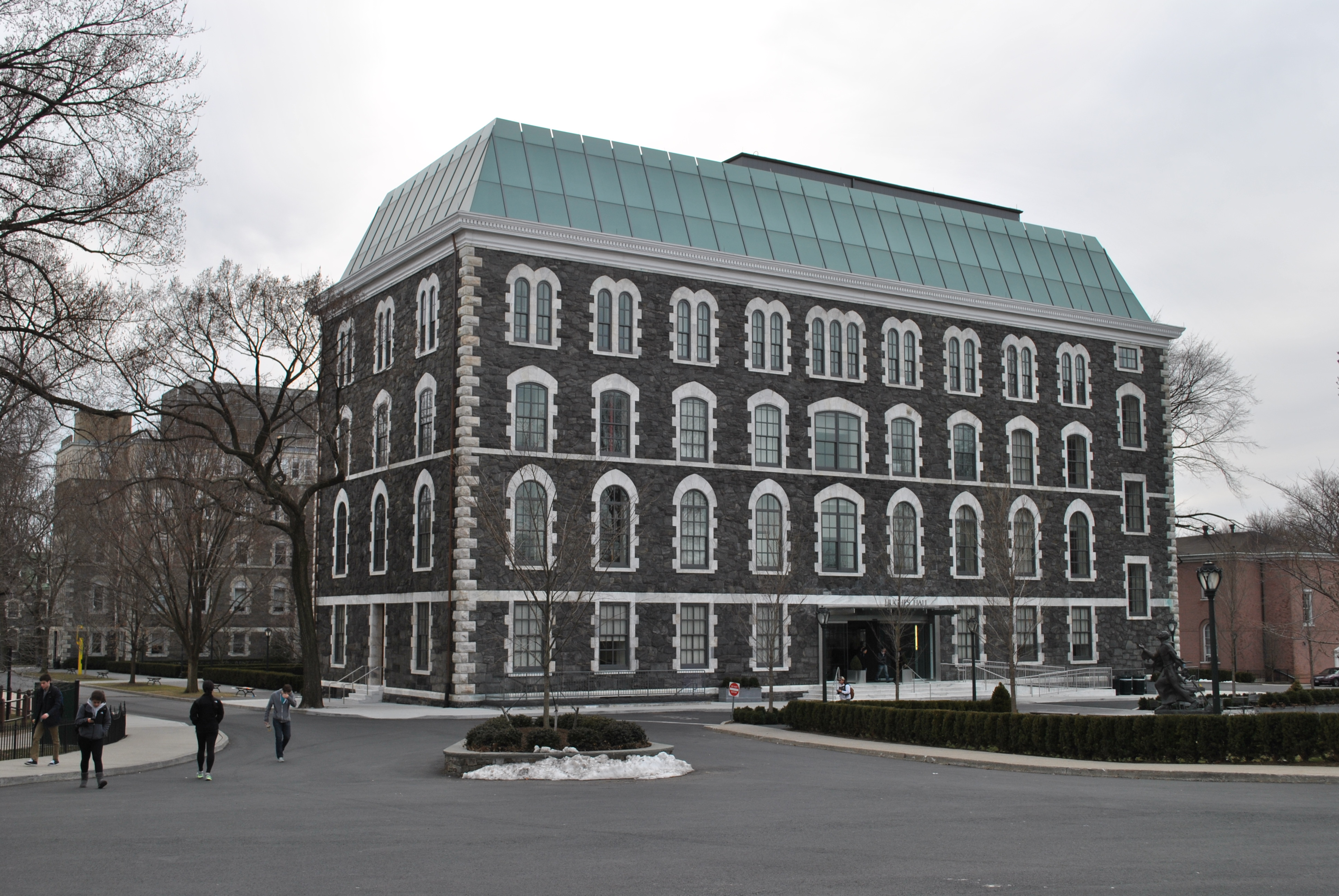
Hughes Hall on the Rose Hill campus, home to Gabelli School of Business

The school is housed across two campuses: in Hughes Hall on the Rose Hill campus, and at Lincoln Center, in the former Law School building and at 45 Columbus Avenue (former College Board headquarters in Manhattan bought by Fordham in 2014, that is located right across the street from the former Law School building). The former Law School building reopened as the "140 W. 62nd St." building of the Lincoln Center campus in Summer 2016. It is primarily the building for the Gabelli School of Business at Lincoln Center, but it is shared with the Quinn Library, student clubs offices, Argo Tea, Health Services, Student Leadership, Multicultural Affairs and Counseling.

== Academics ==
The Gabelli School of Business offers undergraduate day and evening programs that lead to Bachelor of Science degrees in finance, Public Accounting, Marketing, Applied Accounting and Finance, Accounting Information Systems, and Management of Information and Communications Systems (MICS).

Within the Master of Business Administration (MBA) program, concentrations are offered in Accounting, Communications and Media Management, Finance and Business Economics, Information Systems, Management Systems, Marketing, Public Accounting and Taxation/Accounting (MTA Program). Within the Master of Science (MS) programs, degrees are awarded in Accounting, Business Enterprise (MBE), Information Technology (MSIS), Accounting, Investor Relations (IR), Media Management, Taxation, Quantitative Finance, Global Finance, and 3 Continent Master of Science in Global Management (3CMGM), Business Analytics (MSBA), Marketing Intelligence (MSMI), and MS in Media Entrepreneurship (MSME).

Special Programs include:

- Executive MBA
- Deming Scholars MBA
- Global Professional MBA
- Joint JD/MBA
- ESADE Business School in Barcelona
- Ph.D. in business administration

The Gabelli School's first cohort of Ph.D. students will begin the school's first doctoral program in the Fall of 2016.

== Research centers ==
Research centers at Fordham Business School include:

- Center for Communications
- Center for Digital Transformation
- Center for Humanistic Management
- Center for Positive Marketing
- Center for Research in Contemporary Finance
- Consortium for Trustworthy Organizations
- Frank J. Petrilli Center for Research in International Finance
- Fordham University Pricing Center
- Gabelli Center for Global Security Analysis
- Global Healthcare Innovation Management Center

== Rankings ==
Business school rankings

U.S. MBA Rankings
- Bloomberg (2025): 55

U.S. News & World Report subject area rankings at the undergraduate level (2020): International business: 10; Finance: 14; Marketing: 20; Entrepreneurship: 15.

Poets & Quants undergraduate ranking (2021): 25 out of 100 nationwide.

U.S. News & World Report subject area rankings at the graduate level (2021): Accounting: 36; Business Analytics: 39; Finance: 15; International Business: 15; Marketing: 14.

U.S. News & World Report graduate ranking (2021): Part-time MBA: 57; Full-time MBA: 64.

Businessweek graduate ranking: 57

Poets & Quants graduate ranking (2020): MBA: 50; EMBA: 50.

Financial Times Global MBA Rankings: Corporate social responsibility: 28; Full-time MBA: 92; EMBA: 79

Corporate Knights Better World MBA Ranking: MBA: 9 worldwide

Forbes MBA Rankings: Full-time MBA: 58

The Economist Rankings (2020): EMBA: 33; WhichMBA 2020 EMBA Gender Balance: 1

QS Business School Rankings: MBA: 56 nationwide; MS in Business Analytics: 37 worldwide

CEO Magazine Rankings: MBA: Tier 1, North America; EMBA: Tier 1, Global - 52 worldwide

== Admissions ==
Admissions decisions are made on a holistic basis that considers academic record, standardized test scores, accomplishments outside of the classroom, recommendations, and essays. The average SAT score (math + verbal only) is 1302. The average GMAT score is 603.

According to BusinessWeek's MBA Profile, between the New York City and Westchester campuses, the school has 349 full-time students and 1,202 part-time students.

== Student life ==
Gabelli School of Business has over 50 active student clubs. Gabelli School of Business also organizes many business conferences each year.

== Notable alumni ==
There are more than 35,000 Fordham School of Business alumni.

- Mario Gabelli, CBA '65, Founder, Chairman, CEO and Chief Investment Officer, GAMCO Investors.
- Stephen J. Hemsley, CBA '74, CEO of UnitedHealth Group
- Maria Elena Lagomasino, GBA '77, CEO (2001–2005) of JP Morgan Private Bank; Board of Directors, Coca-Cola
- Lorenzo Mendoza, CEO of Empresas Polar.
- Angelo R. Mozilo, CBA '60, co-founder, Chairman and CEO, Countrywide Financial Corporation
- Eugene Shvidler, GBA (MBA and MS in International Taxation).
- Jack Keane, co-founder and Senior Managing Director, Keane Advisors; Retired 4-star General and Former Vice Chief of Staff-US Army
