= Petrilli =

Petrilli is a surname. Notable people with the surname include:

- Aristide Petrilli (1868-1930?), Italian sculptor
- Frank J. Petrilli, American business executive
- Giuseppe Petrilli (1913–1999), Italian professor and European Commissioner
- Savina Petrilli (1851–1923), Italian Roman Catholic professed religious
- Susan Petrilli (born 1954), Italian semiotician
