= Robert L. James =

American businessman

- Born: September 23, 1936; New York City, U.S.
- Died: August 29, 2021 (aged 84)
- Education: Colgate University; Columbia University
- Occupation: Businessman

Robert L. James (September 23, 1936 – August 29, 2021) was an American businessman.

== Life and career ==
James was born in New York City. He attended Fordham Preparatory School, followed by Colgate University, graduating in 1958. He also attended Columbia University, earning his M.B.A. degree in 1961.

James was chairman and chief executive of McCann-Erickson Worldwide during the 1980s/1990s.

James died on August 29, 2021, at the age of 84.
