= Marty Beck =

American football player (1900-1968)

Profile
- Position: Back

Personal information
- Born: January 2, 1900; New York, New York, U.S.
- Died: June 15, 1968 (aged 68); New York, New York, U.S.
- Listed height: 5 ft 9 in (1.75 m)
- Listed weight: 175 lb (79 kg)

Career information
- High school: Fordham Prep (Bronx, New York)
- College: None

Career history
- Akron Pros / Indians (1921–1922, 1924, 1926)

Career statistics
- Games played: 11
- Games started: 3
- Stats at Pro Football Reference

Martin J. Beck (January 2, 1900 – June 15, 1968) was an American multi-sport athlete, playing both American football and baseball. He played as a halfback for the Akron Pros / Indians of the National Football League (NFL) between 1921 and 1926.
