= Liza Featherstone =

American journalist

- Born: April 21, 1969 (age 57); Washington, D.C., U.S.
- Education: University of Michigan; Columbia University
- Occupations: Journalist; writer; teacher
- Years active: 1992–present
- Spouse: Doug Henwood
- Children: 1

Liza Featherstone (born April 21, 1969) is an American journalist and journalism professor who writes frequently on labor and student activism for The Nation and Jacobin.

== Early life and education ==
Featherstone was born in Washington, D.C., and grew up in greater Boston. She graduated from the University of Michigan in Ann Arbor in 1991 with honors and from the Columbia University Graduate School of Journalism in 2008. Featherstone was a Knight-Bagehot Fellow in Business and Economics Journalism at Columbia for 2007–08.

== Career ==
From 2013 to 2015, Featherstone held the Belle Zeller visiting chair in public policy at Brooklyn College. She teaches at New York University and Columbia's School of International Public Affairs.

Featherstone's writing has appeared in Lingua Franca, San Francisco Bay Guardian, Left Business Observer, Dissent, Sydney Morning Herald, Columbia Journalism Review, The New York Times, The Washington Post, Newsday, In These Times, Ms., Salon.com, Nerve, Us, Nylon, and Rolling Stone.

Featherstone has also written several books. She is the author of Divining Desire: Focus Groups and the Culture of Consultation, published by OR Books, a popular history of the focus group that situates it in a political context and examines its relationship to democracy. Featherstone is also the co-author of Students Against Sweatshops: The Making of a Movement (2002). In 2004, she published Selling Women Short: The Landmark Battle for Workers' Rights at Wal-Mart, a history of Dukes vs. Wal-Mart, the largest civil rights class-action suit in history.

== Personal life ==
Featherstone lives in Brooklyn and is married to economics journalist Doug Henwood. They have a son. She is a member of the Democratic Socialists of America.

== Books ==
- Selling Women Short: The Landmark Battle for Workers' Rights at Wal-Mart (2002) ISBN 0-465-02315-0
- False Choices: The Faux Feminism of Hillary Rodham Clinton (2016) ISBN 1784784613
- Divining Desire: Focus Groups and the Culture of Consultation (2017) ISBN 978-1-682191-06-4
