= Ralph DeNunzio =

American businessman

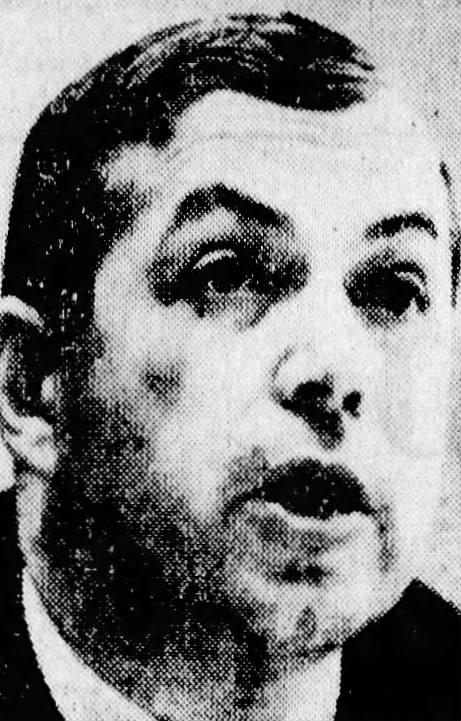
- DeNunzio in 1972
- Born: November 17, 1931; White Plains, New York, U.S.
- Died: October 17, 2022 (aged 90)
- Education: Princeton University
- Occupation: Businessman

Ralph DeNunzio (November 17, 1931 – October 17, 2022) was an American businessman.

== Life and career ==
DeNunzio was born in White Plains, New York. He graduated from Fordham Preparatory School and Princeton University.

DeNunzio was chairman of the New York Stock Exchange during the 1970s. He was also chairman and president of Kidder, Peabody & Company during the 1980s.

DeNunzio died on October 17, 2022, at the age of 90.
