= Horace McKenna =

Horace B. McKenna, S.J. (January 2, 1899 — May 11, 1982) was an American Catholic priest, founder of S.O.M.E. (So Others Might Eat), and advocate of the Sursum Corda Cooperative.

== Biography ==
The sixth of 12 children, Horace was born in 1899 New York City, the son of Dr. Charles F. McKenna, a respected chemist and first chemical engineering graduate of Columbia University School of Mines, and Laura O'Neill McKenna. Educated at Fordham Preparatory School, McKenna entered the Society of Jesus at St. Andrew-on-the-Hudson on July 30, 1916. Between 1921 and 1923, he taught in a Jesuit school in Manila, Philippines. There, he discovered the desperate needs of the poor and oppressed. He was ordained June 23, 1929 and assigned to pastor parishes in southern Maryland amidst poverty and segregation including St. Peter Claver's Church, St. James' Church, St. Ignatius' Church and St. Inigoes's where he was assigned in June 1931. Here he worked for twenty-two years, and among his efforts helped create the Ridge Purchasing and Marketing Association. He was active in civil rights, Vietnam-era anti-war protests and the Poor People's Campaign.

From 1953 to 1958, he served at St. Aloysius Gonzaga parish, a Jesuit church a few blocks north of the U.S. Capitol, and then as assistant pastor at the Church of the Gesú in Philadelphia, Pennsylvania from 1958 to 1964. In 1964 he returned to St. Aloysius and remained there for the rest of his life, living at Gonzaga College High School and serving the poor. In his commitment to social justice in Washington, D.C., Fr. McKenna founded So Others Might Eat, a soup kitchen, clinic and employment center; Martha's Table, a soup kitchen and child education center; and House of Ruth, a center for homeless women. He was also one of the leaders in establishing the Sursum Corda Cooperative, a housing development for the poor. Documentation of his life's work is maintained in the Georgetown University Library Special Collections Division.

McKenna was named "Washingtonian of the Year" by Washingtonian Magazine in 1977. He received an honorary degree from the University of Scranton in 1998. The McKenna Center, a local shelter and soup kitchen for homeless men, located under the Great Church of St. Aloysius, was named after him in 1982. McKenna Walk NW, a short street within Sursum Corda, is also named after him.

The Father McKenna Center is still located in the basement of Saint Aloysius Catholic Church at 900 North Capitol Street NW in Washington, DC. The McKenna Center exists to meet the needs of the poor and homeless who reside in one of Washington's poorest neighborhoods despite being in the shadow of the US Capitol Building. McKenna Center serves the needs of the poor, men, women and children. Each day, the McKenna Center fulfills the Gospel instruction to “feed the hungry, shelter the homeless and clothe the naked”.
