= Frank J. Petrilli =

American businessman

- Born: c. 1950
- Died: December 16, 2025 (aged 74–75)
- Education: Fordham University
- Occupations: E-Trade (chief executive officer, 2012-2013); Surge Trading, Inc. (former CEO); NExxar Group, Inc. (former President & CEO); TD Waterhouse (former President & CEO, 1995-2004); American Express Centurion Bank (former President & COO)

Frank J. Petrilli (c. 1950 – December 16, 2025) was the interim chief executive officer of E-Trade (August 2012 - January 2013) and served as Chairman of the company's board of directors from January 2012 through May 2013. Before that he was CEO of Surge Trading, Inc. and previously served as president and CEO of Nexxar Group, Inc. From 1995 to 2004 he held several positions at TD Waterhouse, including President and CEO. Prior to TD Waterhouse, he was President and Chief Operating Officer of American Express Centurion Bank.

== Education ==
Petrilli attended the Fordham Preparatory School. Petrilli holds a Bachelor of Science from Fordham College of Business and an MBA from Fordham Graduate School of Business. He received his Chartered Financial Analyst (CFA) designation in 1986.
