= John Liscio =

American journalist and financial analyst

- Born: 1949; Manhattan, New York City, New York, U.S.
- Died: November 29, 2000 (aged 51); Manhattan, New York City, New York, U.S.
- Education: Fordham University
- Occupations: Writer, analyst, journalist
- Employer(s): U.S. News & World Report; Barron's
- Known for: The Liscio Report
- Spouse: Frances Pelzman Liscio

John Liscio (1949 – November 29, 2000) was an American journalist covering finance and the economy as well as an independent financial analyst. He was the founder of the influential bond market newsletter, The Liscio Report.

Liscio was born to Armand and Josephine Liscio in Manhattan and matriculated from Fordham Preparatory School in the Bronx to Fordham University where he earned a bachelor's degree. He served in the Marine Corps before becoming a financial writer and analyst in the late 1970s. He was a senior editor at U.S. News & World Report and worked at Barron's in the late 1980s into the early 1990s. In 1992 he started The Liscio Report, a financial newsletter that became influential on Wall Street and especially so among bond traders. Upon his death in 2000 the newsletter was continued by trusted associates Doug Henwood and Phillipa Dunne.

Liscio died, aged 51, on November 29, 2000, at Mount Sinai Hospital in Manhattan from liver and kidney failure complications due to a hepatitis C infection. He was survived by his wife, Frances Pelzman Liscio, a humor writer, two preadolescent children, both his parents, and a sister.
