= Doug Henwood =

American journalist (born 1952)

Douglas Francis Henwood
- Born: December 7, 1952 (age 73); Teaneck, New Jersey, U.S.
- Education: Yale University; University of Virginia
- Occupation: Writer
- Known for: Economic and cultural analysis
- Notable work: Wall Street: How It Works and for Whom
- Spouse: Liza Featherstone
- Children: 1
- Website: lbo-news.com

Doug Henwood (born December 7, 1952) is an American writer. Until 2013, he published a newsletter, Left Business Observer, that analyzed economics and politics from a left-wing perspective. He is a contributing editor at The Nation.

== Early life and education ==
Henwood was born to Harold and Victorine Henwood in Teaneck, New Jersey, and grew up in Westwood, New Jersey. As a youth, he was acquainted with Marxism, but he briefly self-identified with conservatism toward the end of high school. According to Henwood: "Sometime late in high school, I fell under the spell of Milton Friedman and Bill Buckley, and about the first thing I did when I got to college was join the Party of the Right (POR). I got tired of all the pompous rituals, and political sanity returned, bringing me back to the left from which I'd started."

Henwood received a B.A. in English from Yale University in 1975. After college, he worked as secretary to the chair of a small Wall Street brokerage firm headed by a former Bell Labs physicist who used quantitative analysis techniques in the mid-1970s, predating the later widespread adoption of similar methods on Wall Street.

From 1976 to 1979, Henwood pursued a doctorate in English at the University of Virginia, but left before completing his dissertation. He then worked for two years as a copywriter and assistant to a medical publisher in New York.

== Career ==
=== Writing ===
In September 1986, Henwood launched Left Business Observer (LBO) (ISSN 1042-0134).

In 1992, Henwood worked with John Liscio on The Liscio Report on the Economy. In 2000, after Liscio's death, Henwood and Phillipa Dunne, a business partner, inherited The Liscio Report and continue to publish it.

Henwood has written four books. His first, The State of the USA Atlas (1994), is a social atlas of the U.S. in the Pluto Press atlas series. This was followed in 1997 by Wall Street (Verso Books), in which Henwood describes the workings of high finance, and then by After the New Economy (The New Press, 2003), an analysis of the 1990s boom and bust. Henwood's most recent book is My Turn: Hillary Clinton Targets the Presidency (Seven Stories Press, 2016).

His articles have appeared in The Nation, Harper's Magazine, Grand Street, The Village Voice, Newsday, the Los Angeles Times, The Guardian, and Extra!. He is a contributing editor at The Nation.

=== Radio and other media ===
Henwood began hosting the weekly radio show and podcast Behind the News in 1996. It is produced at KPFA and, formerly, WBAI. Henwood had been a regular contributor to Samori Marksman's show starting in 1989. Notable guests include Noam Chomsky, James K. Galbraith, Christopher Hitchens, Lewis H. Lapham, George McGovern, Joseph Stiglitz, Gore Vidal, Yanis Varoufakis, and Slavoj Žižek.

On November 11, 2010, Henwood announced his retirement from Behind the News under WBAI.

In 2017, Behind the News was picked up by Jacobin for its Jacobin Radio Podcast.

Henwood appeared in Lapham's dramatic documentary film The American Ruling Class.

== Personal life ==
Henwood is married to journalist Liza Featherstone; they live in Brooklyn with their son. He is a member of the Democratic Socialists of America.

== Books ==
Henwood has written four books and is working on a fifth.

- State of the U.S.A. Atlas (1994), ISBN 978-0-671-79696-9
- Wall Street (1997), ISBN 0-86091-670-7
- After the New Economy (2003), ISBN 1-56584-770-9
- My Turn: Hillary Clinton Targets the Presidency (2015), ISBN 978-1-682190-32-6
