= Martha's Table =

U.S. non-profit organization

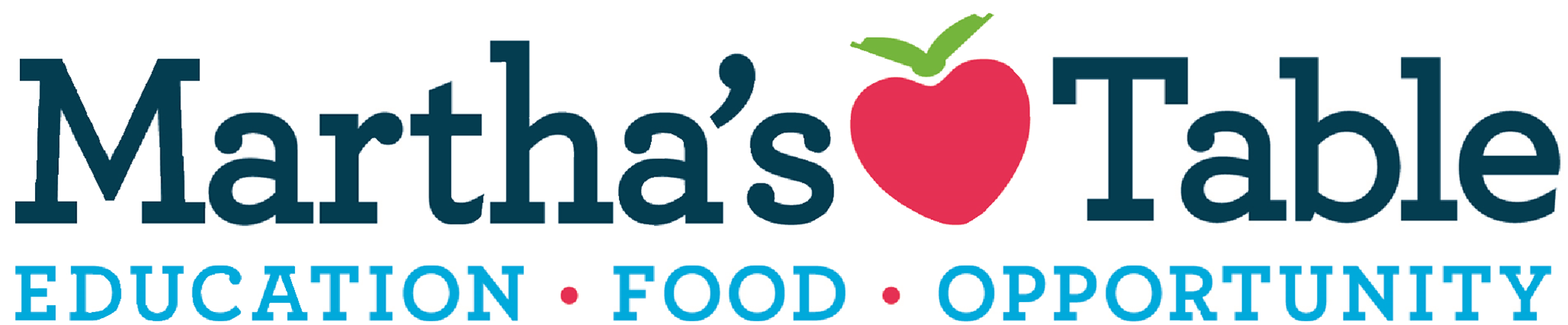
- Founded: September 1980; 45 years ago
- Purpose: Children's Education, Nutrition, Clothing
- Location: 2375 Elvans Road SE Washington, DC 20020
- Key people: Tiffany Williams, President and CEO
- Employees: 120
- Website: marthastable.org

Martha's Table (founded in 1980) is a non-profit organization, an active charity and volunteer center in the Washington, D.C., area.

== History ==
Martha's Table started in 1980 as a safe place for children to receive free sandwiches and food after school. The organization was named after the Martha of The Bible, a follower and friend of Jesus. While Martha's Table is not a religiously based organization, the founders Veronica Maz, a social worker, and Father Horace McKenna, a Jesuit Priest, chose the name "Martha’s Table" to represent the dignity of the one who serves.

Martha's Table gradually grew to address the additional needs of the community through its onsite early childhood education programs and expanded food distribution programs.

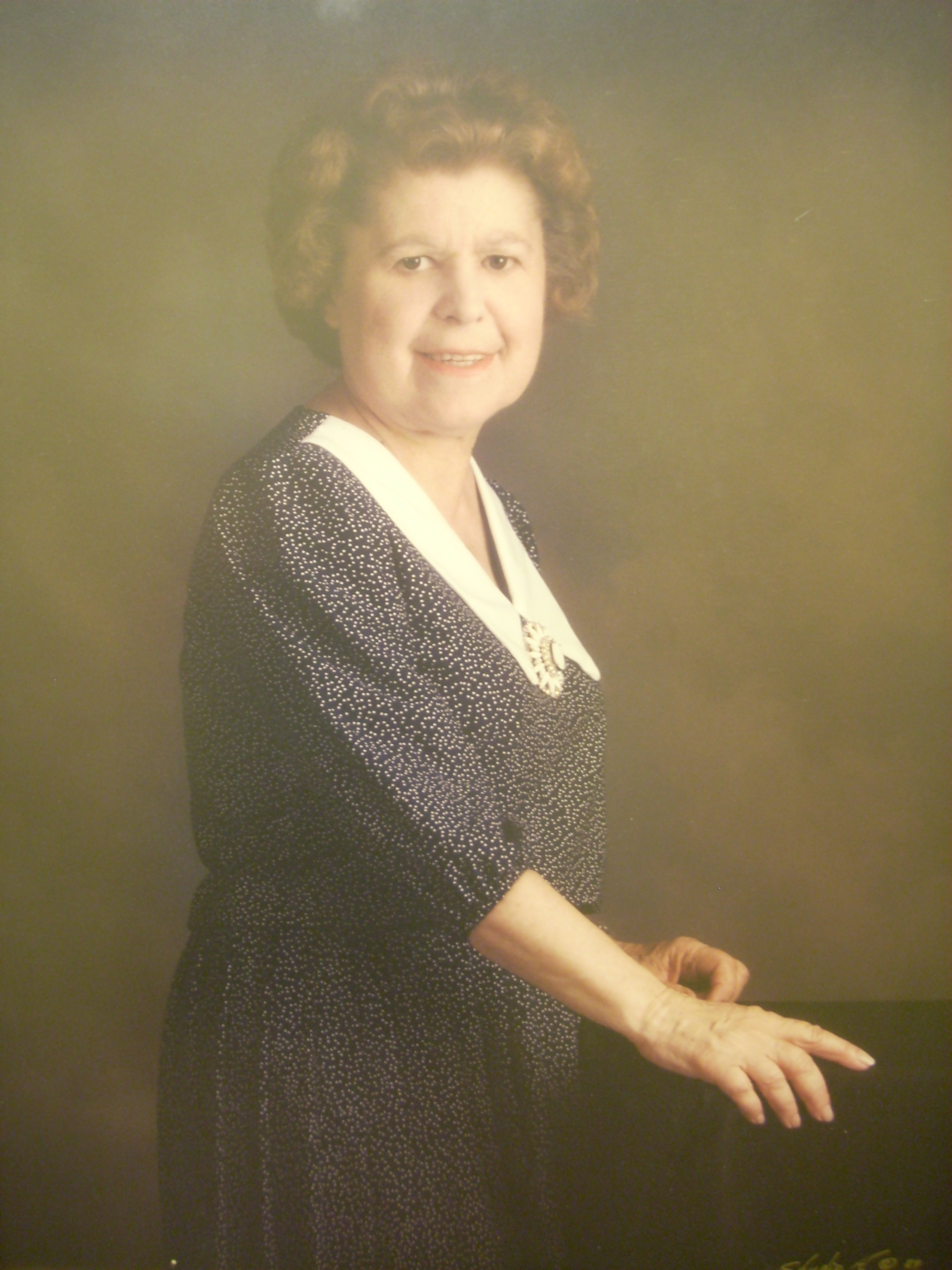
Veronica Maz (founder of Martha's Table)

=== Veronica Maz (1980–1987) ===
Veronica Maz served as the first president and CEO of Martha's Table. Maz was a sociology professor at Georgetown when she began working with Jesuit priest Horace B. McKenna in an attempt to turn concerns about poverty in the District into action.

=== Veronica Parke (1987–2004) ===
Maz was succeeded Veronica Parke. Under Parke the programs at Martha's Table expanded to serve children along the entire age spectrum, from 3 months to 18 years. The children's program expanded into three areas: a daily program for preschoolers and their mothers; daily provision of breakfast, lunch, and snacks; education and play activities for children both during the school year and summer vacation, as well as activities on weekends.

=== Lindsey Buss (2004–2012) ===
Lindsey Buss succeeded Parke in 2004.

=== Patty Stonesifer (2013–2022) ===
In April 2013, Martha's Table hired the former CEO of the Bill & Melinda Gates Foundation, Patty Stonesifer, as the new President and CEO.

=== Tiffany Williams (2022–present) ===
In December 2022, Martha's Table announced that Tiffany Williams would be appointed as the new President and CEO.

== Programs ==
=== Food ===
==== McKenna's Wagon ====
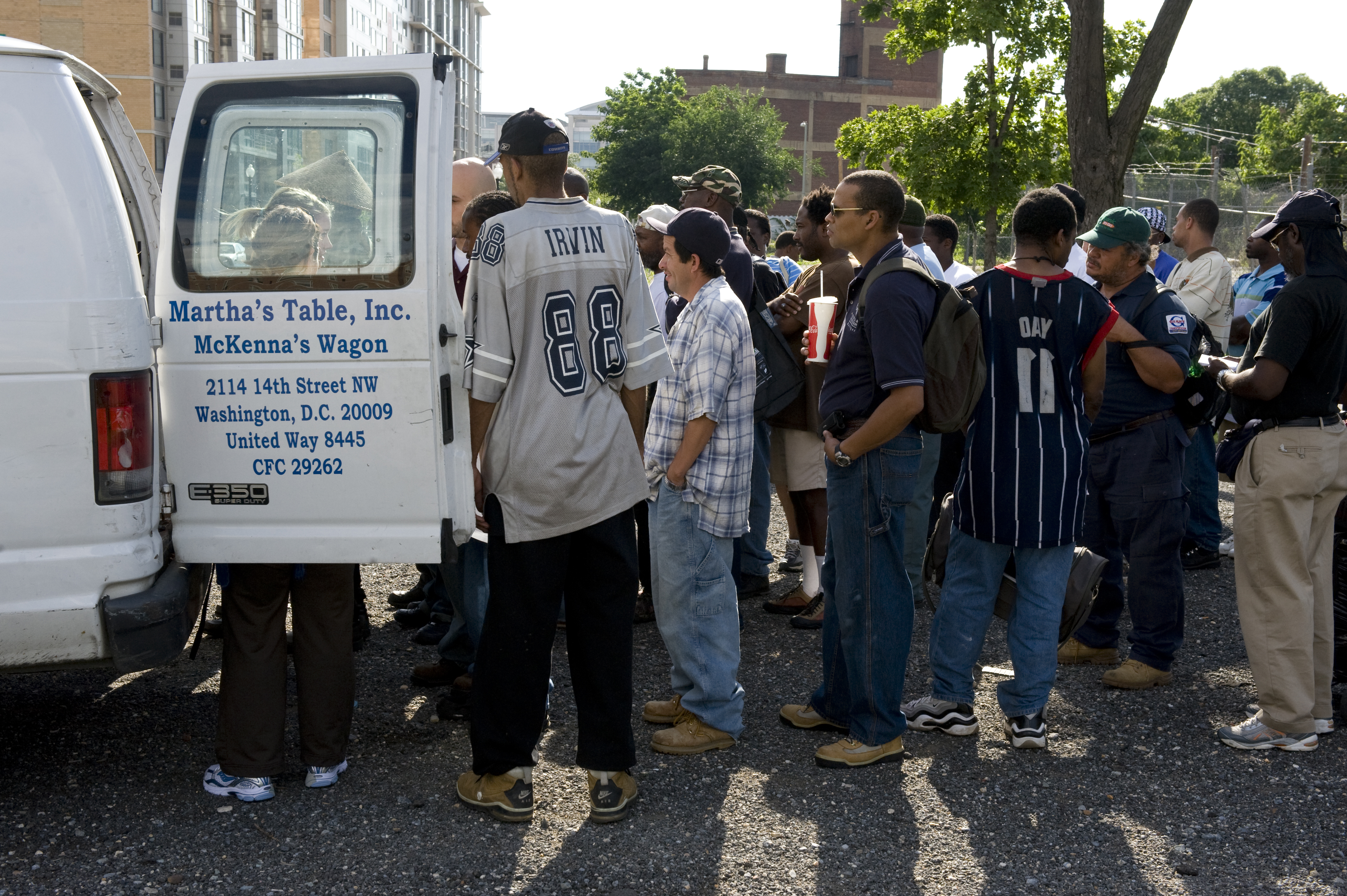
McKenna's Wagon

McKenna's Wagon, the organization's mobile food truck, runs 365 days a year to help feed the District's homeless and hungry population. The Wagon is named after the founder of Martha's Table, Horace McKenna. Volunteers stop at locations around the D.C. metro area and serve hot meals, sandwiches, homemade muffins, fresh fruit and refreshments.

=== Education ===
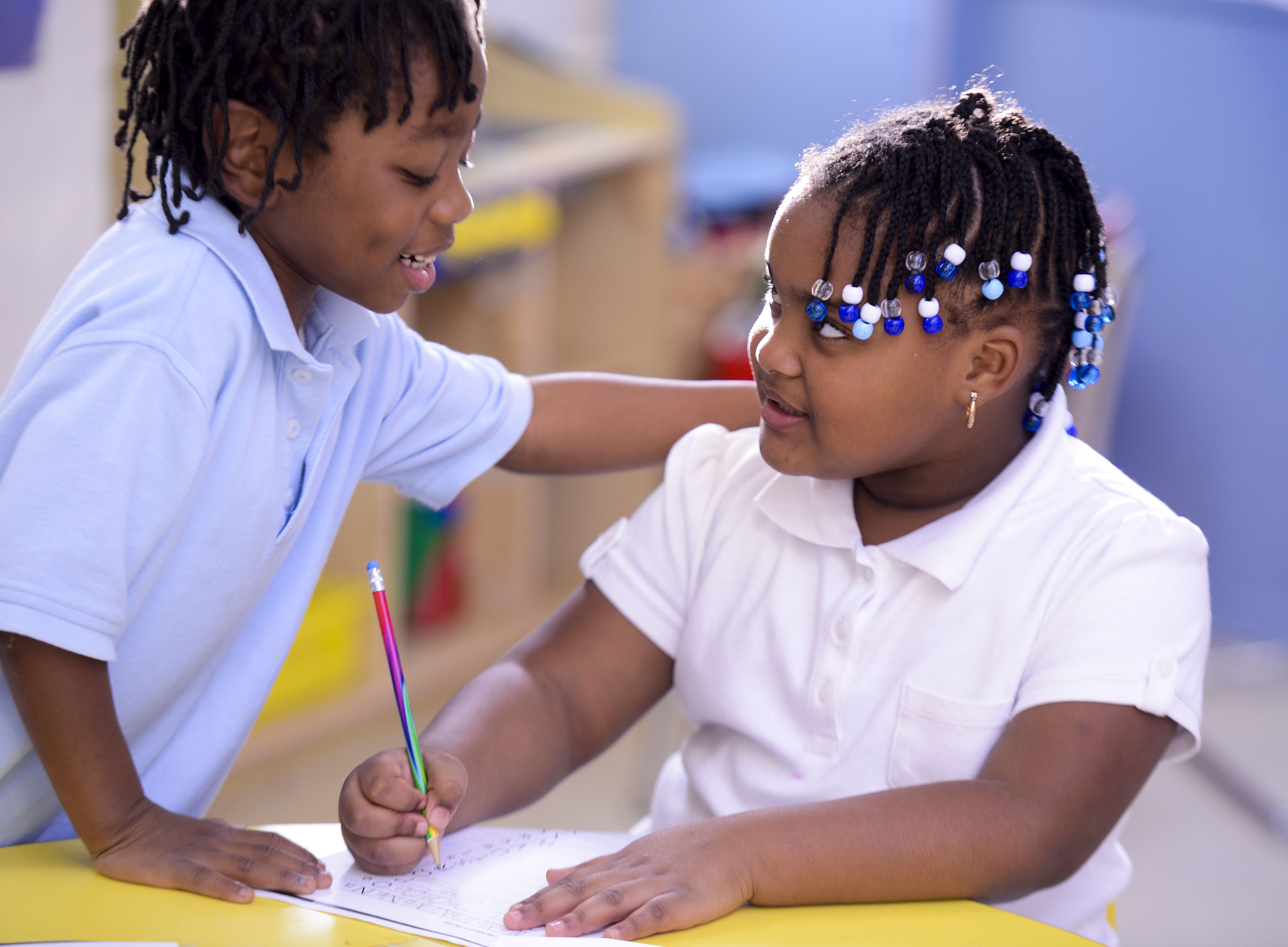
Early Child Care program

==== Early Child Education ====
Martha's Table is a nationally accredited Child Development Center. It is a fully bilingual program for children ages 3 months to 3 years. The center explores a "Learn through Play" approach with its infants, toddlers and preschoolers. T

==== Elementary to Career Program (5–13 years) ====
Nationally accredited through the National After-School Association, the after-school programs for younger children offers students a range of academic and enrichment opportunities, including tutoring, homework assistance, and developing literacy and math skills.

=== Opportunity ===
==== Martha's Outfitters ====
Martha's Outfitters is a second-hand thrift store that originally started in 2004 as a clothes closet. The store serves roughly 50,000 customers a year, generating more $425,000 in revenue. Revenue from purchases are dedicated to the education, food and clothing programs. Martha's Outfitters also offers a free clothing distribution program to clients referred by one of the 100 agency partners throughout the Washington, D.C., area, allowing them access to free casual and work clothing, interview attire, housewares, and linens.

== Recognition ==
Martha's Table has been granted accreditation status through the National Association for the Education of Young Children (NAEYC) for their Child Development Center.

Charity Navigator gave Martha's Table a four-star rating in 2017.
