= Louis A. Perrotta =

Italian-American surgeon (1900–1985)

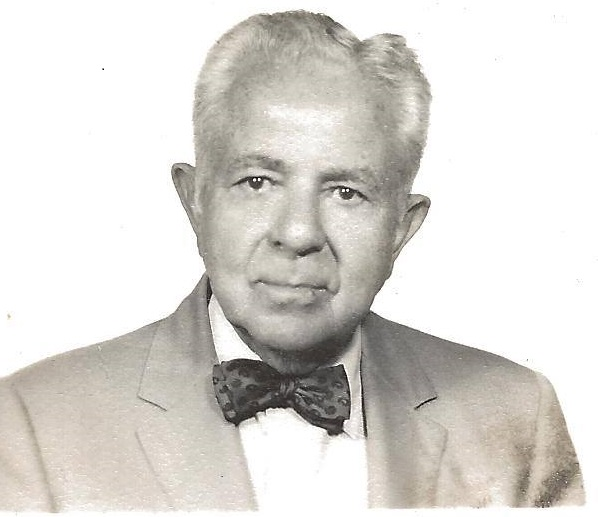
- Perrotta, aged 65
- Born: September 27, 1900; Arienzo, Italy
- Died: March 29, 1985 (aged 84); The Bronx, New York City
- Education: Fordham University; Bellevue Hospital Medical College

Louis A. Perrotta (September 27, 1900 – March 29, 1985) was an Italian-American surgeon in New York. His research in spinal anesthesia in 1943 demonstrated that pain control during childbirth could be achieved. His clinical study showed that rapid painless childbirth was safe and possible with the use of regional anesthesia at a time when this was not accepted common practice. The study utilized two controversial and polarizing techniques in obstetrics: Spinal anesthesia and manual cervical dilation. Perrotta was an owner and founder of Pelham Bay General Hospital in New York in 1960 where he was the Director of Surgery. Perrotta held academic positions as Professor of Pediatrics at Bellevue Medical College, Clinical Professor at New York University School of Medicine and Associate Clinical Professor of Surgery New York Medical College. Perrotta served as the house physician to the Metropolitan Opera House in New York City from 1950 to 1966 and as a personal physician to the opera stars from the Met. Perrotta was interviewed on Midday Live regarding his work ethic and professional life.

== Early life ==
Perrotta was born in Italy on September 27, 1900. He was the seventh of ten children who survived past infancy. His family immigrated to America in 1908, arriving at Ellis Island on the S.S. Venezia. They settled in the Bronx, New York. At Fordham Preparatory School in the Bronx, he studied music and took violin, mandolin and vocal lessons. Singing helped finance his college tuition at Fordham University. He graduated from Bellevue Hospital Medical College in Manhattan in 1927 with the degree Doctor of Medicine.

== Research ==
In 1943, Perrotta and Dr. H. Koster published the clinical study "Elective Painless Rapid Childbirth Anticipating Labour ( by procaine spinal anesthesia)". The study demonstrated that neuraxial anesthesia could be safely used to alleviate the pain of childbirth . In 1943, spinal anesthesia was not the standard of care and was widely considered dangerous for pregnant women. Present day obstetrics shows that the opposite is true, and caudal anesthesia is presently the most common and safest modality for anesthesia in pregnant women. Early recognition of the technique was met with resistance. While spinal anesthesia would go on to be indispensable in the world of obstetrics, manual cervical dilation would fall out of favor in the years since the study. Perrotta and Koster originally employed the combined procedures to facilitate delivery in cases of cervical dystocia, while also eliminating pain from the event. The study showed that a healthy full term fetus could be delivered comfortably, before labor, in less than 40 minutes. Spinal anesthesia is now implemented routinely in labor and cesarean section as it provides a rapid onset of sensory motor block and excellent pain control. The techniques of spinal and epidural anesthesia became common practice as they were shown to be safer for the mother and newborn than sedatives and opioids.

== Professional life ==
In 1960 Perrotta founded Pelham Bay General Hospital in the Bronx, where he served as director of surgery and co-owner. The hospital provided emergency, surgical and maternity services until it closed on January 30, 2004. Perrotta was a surgeon practicing in New York from 1927 until his death in 1985. He had a large Bronx-based practice of predominantly Italian American patients. He was the house physician at The Metropolitan Opera House in New York and the personal physician to Opera stars Franco Corelli and Carlo Bergonzi.

== Academic appointments ==
- Professor of Pediatrics at Bellevue Medical School from 1928–1931.
- Attending Physician at NYU Medical College 1930–1931.
- Attending Surgeon Columbus Hospital 1935–1937.
- Attending Surgeon Lutheran Hospital from 1935–1955.
- Associate Attending Surgeon at the City Hospital of New York on Welfare Island 1938–1940.
- Attending Surgeon in the Department of Urology at the New York Cancer City Hospital 1940-1944
- Director of Surgery at Crown Heights Hospital in Brooklyn 1944-1954
- Director of the Department of Medicine and Professor at SUNY Maritime College from 1954–1955.
- Associate Clinical Professor of Surgery at New York Medical College from 1944–1959.
- Director of Surgery at Lutheran Hospital in NY from 1955–1956.
- Director of Surgery Pelham Bay General Hospital 1960–1970.

== Personal life ==
In 1928 he married Caroline Perrillo, and they had two daughters, Sophia and Dolores. In 1928 he opened a medical practice on Morris Avenue in the Bronx. In 1937, Caroline died of rheumatic heart disease. On April 26, 1942 he married Elvira Spatafore. They lived in the Country Club area of the Bronx and had four children, Maria, Paulette, Louis and Vera Lou.
