= Matt Brennan (American football) =

American football player (1897–1963)

No. 5, 7/8
- Position: Back

Personal information
- Born: October 3, 1897; Stamford, Connecticut, U.S.
- Died: January 3, 1963 (aged 65); Bethlehem, Pennsylvania, U.S.
- Listed height: 6 ft 1 in (1.85 m)
- Listed weight: 190 lb (86 kg)

Career information
- High school: Fordham Prep (The Bronx)
- College: Villanova (1916); Fordham (1917); Lafayette (1920–1922)

Career history
- New York Giants (1925); Brooklyn Lions (1926)
- Stats at Pro Football Reference

Matthew William Brennan (October 3, 1897 – January 3, 1963) was an American professional football back who played two seasons in the National Football League (NFL) with the New York Giants and Brooklyn Lions. He played college football at Villanova University, Fordham University, and Lafayette College.

== Early life and college ==
Matthew William Brennan was born on October 3, 1897, in Stamford, Connecticut. He attended Fordham Preparatory School in the Bronx.

Brennan was a letterman for the Villanova Wildcats of Villanova University in 1916, the Fordham Maroon of Fordham University in 1917, and Lafayette College from 1920 to 1922.

== Professional career ==
Brennan played in six games, starting three, for the New York Giants of the National Football League (NFL) in 1925 and missed one field goal. He wore jersey number 5 while with the Giants.

He appeared in ten games, starting nine, for the Brooklyn Lions of the NFL during the 1926 season, scoring one passing touchdown, one rushing touchdown, and one field goal. He wore both number 7 and 8 with the Lions.

== Personal life ==
Brennan served in the United States Marine Corps. He died on January 3, 1963, in Bethlehem, Pennsylvania.
