= Kent Automatic Garages =

Former chain of parking garages

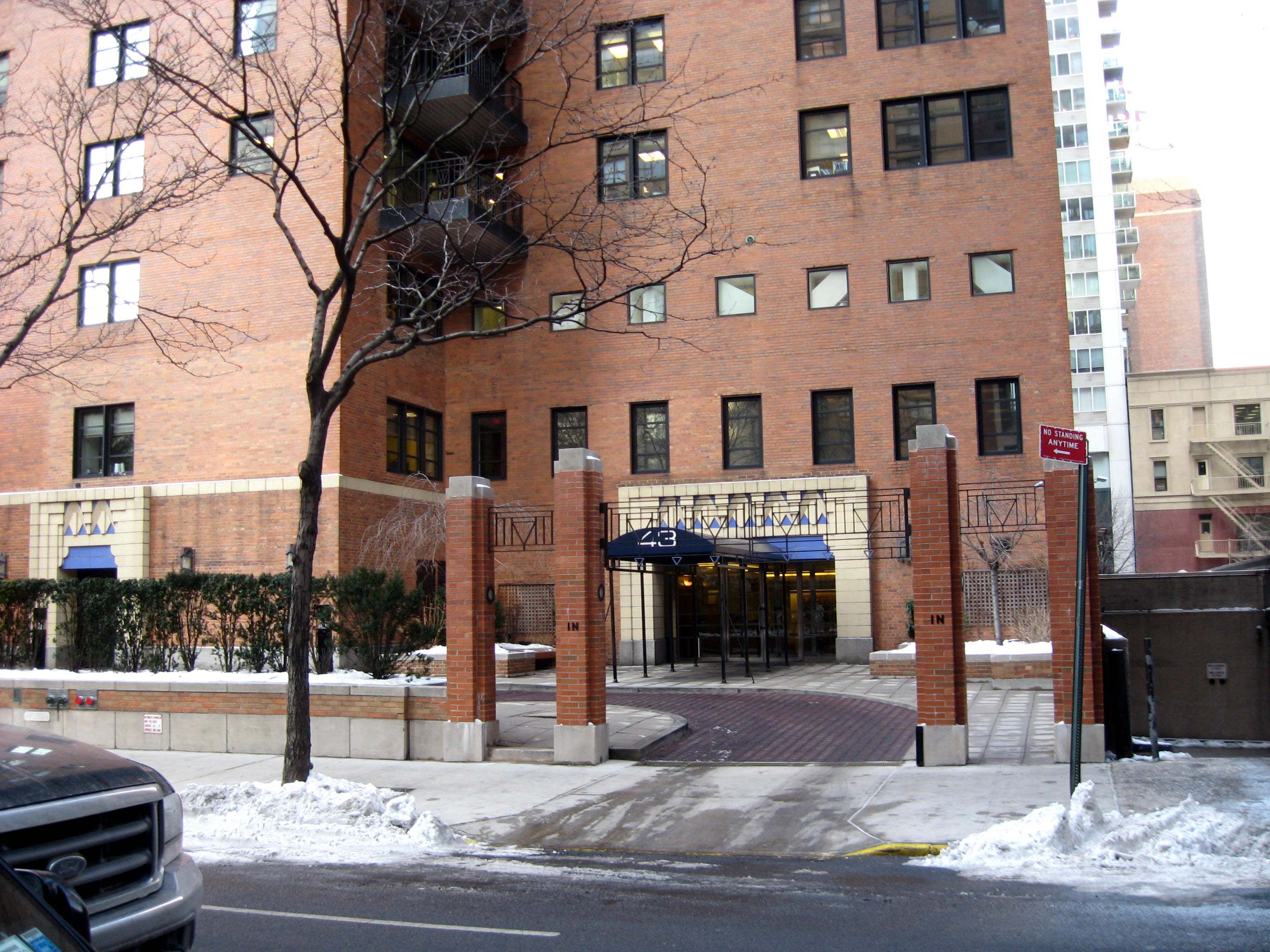
Columbus Circle garage, now the Sofia apartment house

Kent Automatic Garages were popular in several metropolitan areas in the U.S. from the late 1920s through the early 1960s. They enabled customers to park their cars for an hour or longer with a standard rate of $.50 per hour for the first two hours, and $.05 for each additional hour or fraction thereof, for a 24-hour period. One of the first Kent Automatic Garages was at 44th Street, just east of 3rd Avenue, and another (now the Sofia) is a block west of Columbus Circle.

== Overview ==
The parking facilities were convenient, beginning with electric automatic parkers that received vehicles. Autos could be stored and returned to patrons at a moment's notice. Specifically, cars were handled by an electric parker, a small rubber-tired machine which ran beneath the auto and engaged with the rear axle using a rubber-cleated coupler. The parker required approximately fifteen seconds to move sixty feet from an elevator, lift the car, and return with it. It saved time by bringing a car from its parking space and returning it to the ground floor, without starting the motor. The auto rolled on its wheels but was moved by the parker.

== Business chronology ==
Kent Automatic Garages were financed by the Kent Garage Investing Corporation of New York City. The first garage, at 209–211 East 43rd Street through to 208–210 East 44th Street, opened in February 1929. In 1928 the Packard Motor Company sold a plot 100 by 140 feet (30 by 43 m), which became a 25-story Kent Automatic Garage on 43 West 61st Street (now the Sofia condominium building) at the northeast corner with Ninth Avenue. The building was a likeness of the Kent Grand Central Station Garage. The land adjoined the Packard showrooms and sold for $600,000. The garage held 1,000 cars. Both garages had been devised by life-insurance salesman Milton A. Kent, who planned to build 15 to 20 such garages across the United States.

Kent announced the construction of a third garage in Newark, New Jersey, in July 1929. By December 1930 the firm had erected a 28-story garage on Quincy Street in Chicago, Illinois, with space for 1,200 cars. The Wabash-Harrison Garage was built in connection with the $15,000,000 Carew Tower in Cincinnati, Ohio. This included a combination 650-room hotel and a 750-car Kent garage. Contracts for equipment and the erection of a $2,000,000 parking garage in Philadelphia, Pennsylvania, had been signed. Kent planned to build other garages, but it is unknown if they were built.

The Kent Automatic Garage at 43rd and 44th Streets was sold in a foreclosure sale by Joseph P. Day, on November 13, 1931. The property brought $60,000 above liens which totaled $700,000. The plaintiff, Fred T. Ley & Co., was the purchaser.

== Decline following World War II ==
The post–World War II economic expansion brought many large autos which cut the capacity of the garages in half. One East Side garage became an office building in 1964. Louis C. Kay bought the 43rd Street garage in 1960. He reduced it to a shell of brick walls and a steel framework. It was converted into a modern office building with a seven-story extension which had a glazed facade. The extension possessed a lobby and additional office space. 40°45′5″N 73°58′23″W

== See also ==
- Knickerbocker and Arnink Garages
- List of New York City Designated Landmarks in Manhattan from 59th to 110th Streets
- National Register of Historic Places listings in Manhattan from 59th to 110th Streets
