= Colman M. Mockler Jr. =

American executive

Colman M. Mockler Jr. (1929–1991) was an American executive who served as the chair of Gillette from 1976 to 1991. Mockler Center is named after him.

== Biography ==
Mockler was born in 1929 in St. Louis, Missouri. He attended Harvard College and Harvard Business School. Mockler was involved in Harvard's governance, serving on the Harvard Corporation and as president of the Board of Overseers from 1979 to 1981.

Mockler joined Gillette in 1957 as a staff assistant. He became the company's president in 1974, CEO in 1975, and chairman in 1976. During his tenure, Mockler maintained Gillette's financial stability and successfully defended the company against takeover attempts, such as the proxy fight initiated by the Coniston Group in 1987.

Mockler served as chairman of Simmons College's Corporation, and held overseer roles at the New England Medical Center, the Boston Museum of Fine Arts, and the Boston Symphony Orchestra. He was also a trustee of the New England Conservatory of Music.
