= Maria Elena Lagomasino =

American businesswoman

Mel Lagomasino

Personal details
- Born: 1950 (age 74–75)
- Education: Manhattanville College (BA); Fordham University (MBA)

Maria Elena Lagomasino is a businesswoman who has been an executive at companies such as Coca-Cola and JPMorgan Chase. In 2007, she was named Hispanic Business Woman of the Year by Hispanic Business magazine.

== Biography ==
Lagomasino received her B.A. from Manhattanville College and her M.B.A. from Fordham University. Before 1983, Lagomasino was a vice president at Citibank, then joined Chase in 1983 as vice president, in charge of Latin America. In 1989, she was named head of the private bank for the Western Hemisphere, then became managing director in charge of its Global Private Banking Group in 1997. She was chairwoman and chief executive officer of JP Morgan Private Bank, a unit of JP Morgan Chase from 2001 to 2003, when she became a director of The Coca-Cola Company. She left Morgan to become CEO of Asset Management Advisors (AMA), an affiliate of SunTrust Banks, in November 2005. She sits on the board of directors of The Coca-Cola Company (where she was voted director in 2008), Avon Products, and the Lincoln Center for the Performing Arts. Ms. Lagomasino has been a Director of The Walt Disney Company since 2015.
