= So Others Might Eat =

Nonprofit organization in Washington, D.C., U.S.

Coordinates: 38.908382°N 77.011173°W

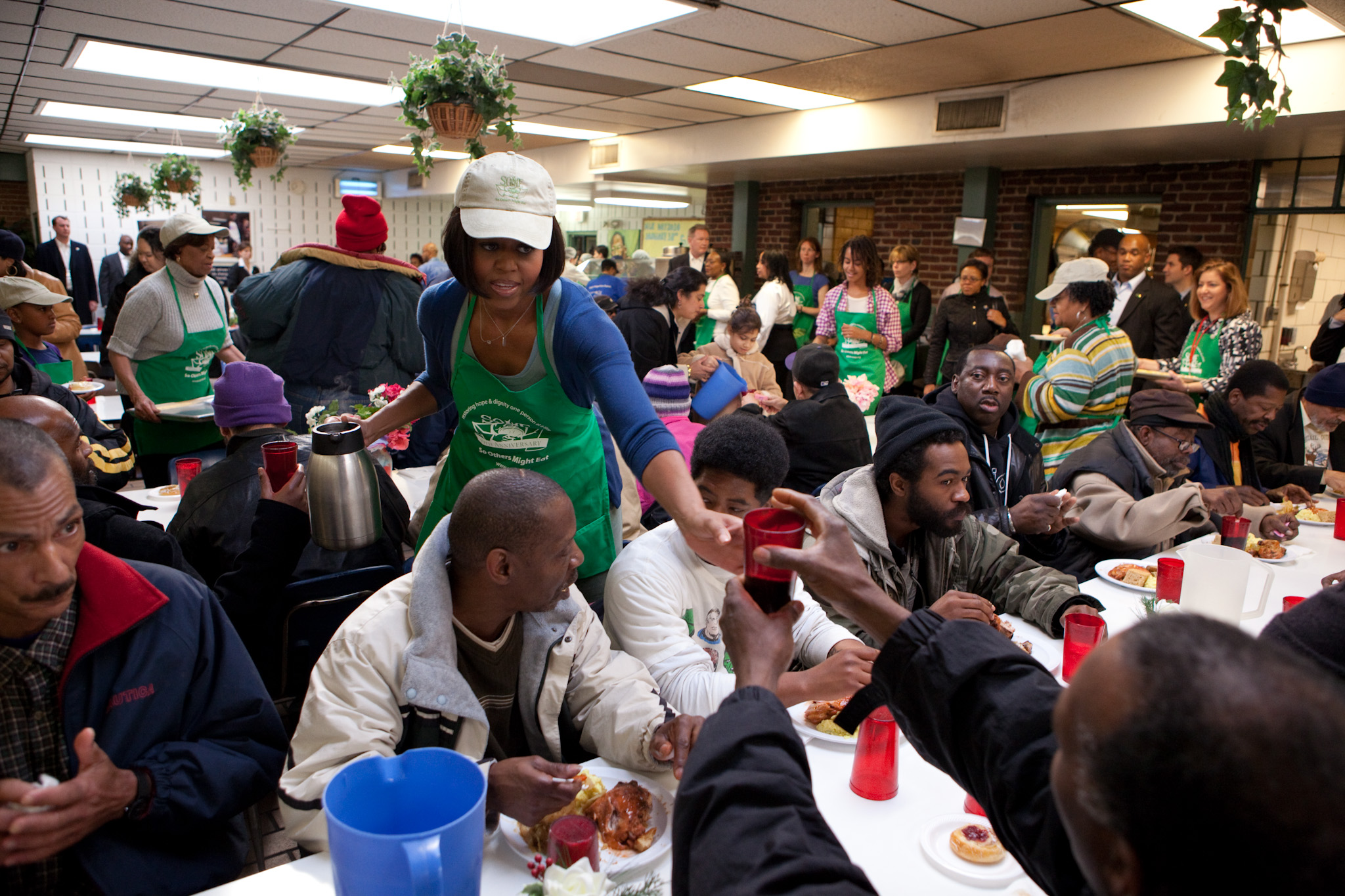
- In honor of Martin Luther King Jr. Day, First Lady Michelle Obama serves lunch in the dining room at So Others Might Eat, in Washington, D.C., January 18, 2010
- Abbreviation: SOME
- Formation: 1970
- Founder: Horace McKenna
- Type: 501(c)(3) nonprofit organization
- Tax ID no.: 23-7098123
- Headquarters: Truxton Circle, Washington, D.C.
- Region served: Washington, D.C.
- Chief Executive Officer: Ralph Boyd
- Subsidiaries: Affordable Housing Opportunities Inc.
- Budget: $35 million (2020)
- Staff: 384 (2020)
- Volunteers: 8,000 (2020)
- Website: some.org

So Others Might Eat (SOME) is a nonprofit organization that provides services to assist those dealing with poverty and homelessness in Washington, D.C. The organization offers affordable housing, job training, counseling and other healthcare services, and daily needs such as food and clothing to the poor and homeless. It spends the largest portion of its annual budget on affordable housing, with a majority of its residents recovering from addiction.

== History ==
=== 1970s ===
SOME was founded in 1970 by Horace McKenna as a soup kitchen. Meals were served in the basement of the St. Aloysius Church on the campus of Gonzaga College High School on North Capitol Street. Father John Adams was appointed as its inaugural president. Over the next few years, SOME bought a property on Abbey Place NE to be used as a rehabilitation center for people with alcoholism. SOME also bought a property on nearby K Street NW called Shalom House for homeless women. The Substance Abuse Program was started in October 1975, including individual and group counseling as well as vocational and job training.

In 1978, SOME appointed Adams as its chief executive officer. The organization also moved to 71 O Street NW, and started the Provide-A-Meal Program in November, with the soup kitchen transitioning into a nutritional meal program serving breakfast and lunch daily. In October 1979, SOME opened a dental clinic to provide dental care to the homeless and others unable to afford a dentist. The Georgetown University Dental School later began to provide care.

=== 1980s ===
In January 1982, SOME opened a medical clinic, operated by the Columbia Road Physician Group, that provided healthcare and counseling services for homeless and low-income individuals. Their Caregivers Program began in May 1984, with case management and volunteer services provided to isolated, home-bound elderly persons in Southeast, Washington, D.C. In January 1986, Isaiah House opened in a townhouse in Northwest, Washington, D.C. as a therapeutic socialization residence for individuals who are homeless and have mental illnesses. SOME's first transitional housing facility opened in February 1986. The facility helped homeless men prepare to live in permanent housing in the community. Six months later, Dwelling Place Emergency Shelter for Abused Elderly opened in Southeast, Washington, D.C.

In July 1989, SOME opened Shalom House through a public-private partnership in Northeast, Washington, D.C., as the organization's first single-room occupancy (SRO) housing residence. The building provided housing for 96 formerly homeless and low-income men and women, including the elderly and the disabled.

=== 1990s ===
A second 90-day transitional housing program, Mickey Leland Place, for homeless men opened in October 1990. Exodus House, a 90-day residential substance abuse treatment program for homeless men, was opened on a 45-acre (180,000 m^{2}) mountaintop plot in West Virginia in June 1991. In September 1991, the Thea Bowman House opened as a 10-unit, two-year transitional apartment house for women with children in Northeast, Washington, D.C. Gandhi Place, house for long-term volunteers, opened in July 1992 in Northeast, Washington, D.C. SOME opened the Anna Cooper House in April 1993 from a converted hotel.

The Maya Angelou House for women was dedicated in January 1996, located on 45 acres (18 ha) that were donated to SOME, and providing a 90-day residential substance abuse treatment program for homeless women. SOME renovated and opened a new facilities for homeless individuals at 60 O Street NW in June 1996, including medical, dental, and eye clinics as well as social service and addiction counseling offices. In August 1996, SOME opened Harvest House Women's Program opened as 12-bed transitional housing with a job readiness training program for homeless women. The Women and Children's Dining Room on O Street was opened in May 1997. In June 1998, SOME's Center for Employment Training opened as an employment training program that will incorporate support services, human development, basic education, and skills training in a program lasting from four to six months. The Center for Employment Training's goal is for adults to find full-time jobs with benefits at a living wage.

=== 2000s ===
The Isaiah House vacated its building and was replaced by the Jordan House in October 2002. The Jordan House provided a crisis stabilization center for those with mental illness and are awaiting access to residential treatment programs. In September 2003, the Leland Place annex project was completed by volunteer construction crews from Holy Trinity's Hands on Housing, and clients from Joshua House moved into the newly expanded space. The Affordable Housing Development Initiative launched in January 2004. The goal of the initiative is to develop 1,000 new units of safe, affordable housing to meet the needs of 2,000 homeless and extremely poor men, women, and children. The next month, the Harvest House Women's Program moved into the space previously occupied by Joshua House. In March 2005, SOME opened the Michael Kirwan House in a donated building to serve as the new location of the Jordan House safe-house program. The program provides a safe and structured alcohol-free and drug-free residence for homeless individuals who are awaiting access to SOME's residential treatment programs. The next month, the Jordan House Crisis Stabilization Program opened, providing housing and residential supportive services to residents who are experiencing a psychiatric crisis, including individual counseling and case management.

Independence Place opened in September 2005, providing permanent affordable housing and an afterschool program. Joseph Smith House opened the following month. In May 2006, Freedom House opened, becoming SOME's fourth SRO. The Mary Claire House opened in September 2006, providing transitional housing to adults with chronic mental illness as they leave SOME's Jordan House Crisis Stabilization Program. In April 2007, SOME purchased a property on Texas Avenue SE, with the intention of using it to provide 48 efficiency units for low income single adults. During the same month, the Father Horace McKenna House opened in Winchester, Virginia, providing affordable housing in the Oxford House model to ten men recovering from addictions. Also in the same month, SOME bought two properties, Bedford Falls and Chabraja House, to provide affordable housing with supportive services. Barnaby House opened in June 2007 as an affordable family housing program in Southeast, Washington, D.C., providing housing to ten low-income and formerly homeless families. During the same month, SOME bought two buildings on Chesapeake Street for family affordable housing. In February 2008, Zagami House opened as an affordable family housing program with supportive services for twelve formerly homeless and extremely low-income families.

SOME opened the Kuehner House on Good Hope Road in 2011 to provide affordable housing to seniors, which provides transitional housing for women who are enrolled as students at the Center for Employment Training. In 2016, SOME started an intervention and support program, Rapid Re-engagement Program. In 2018, SOME opened the Conway Center in Northeast, Washington, D.C., which includes affordable housing units and a health center, and serves as the new location for the Center for Employment Training.

In April 2020, SOME appointed Ralph Boyd as its CEO, replacing Father John Adams who had been in the role for 42 years.
