= The Sofia =

Building in Manhattan, New York

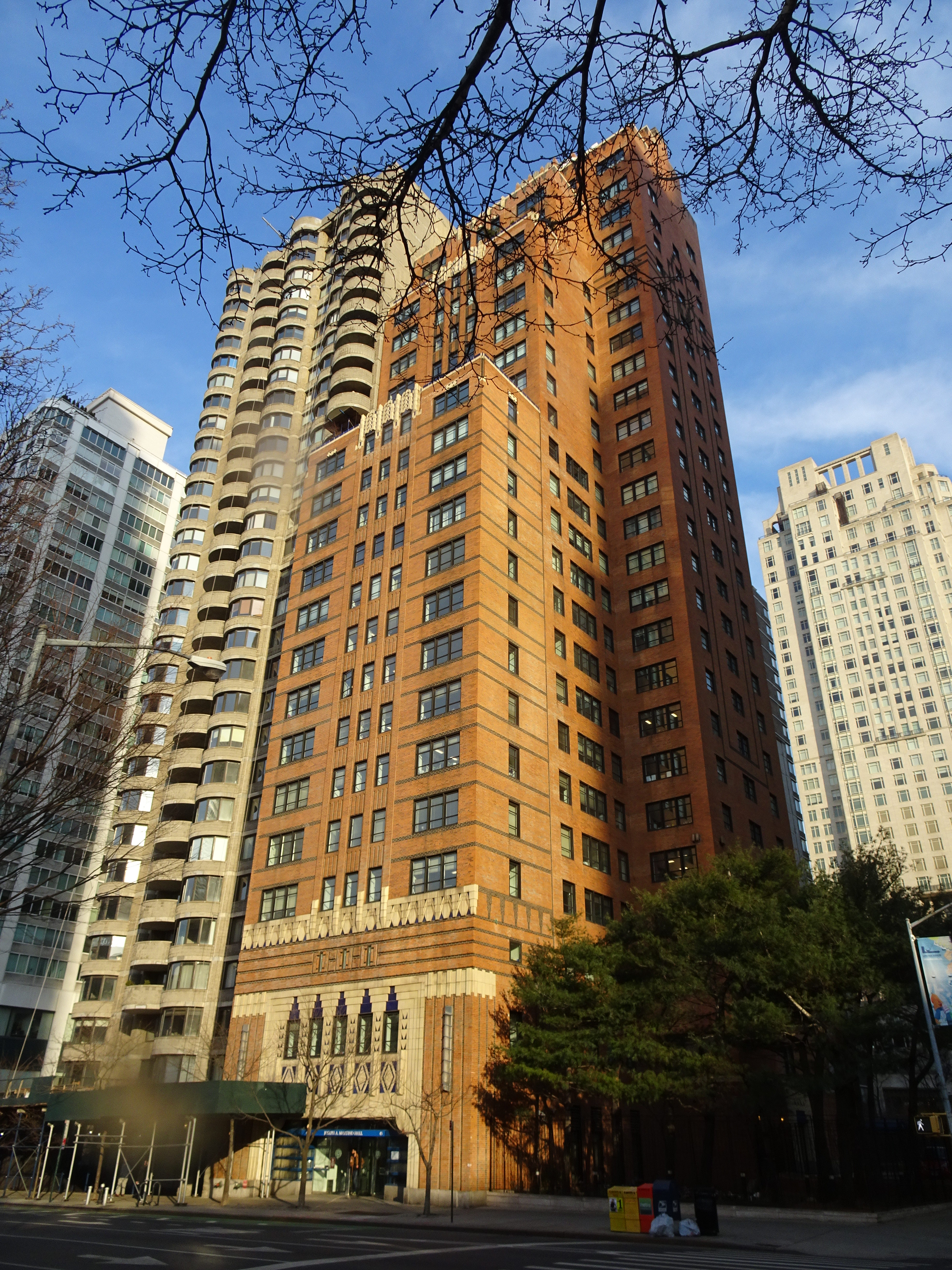
- View from 61st Street and Columbus Avenue
- Interactive map of the The Sofia area
- Former names: Kent Automatic Garage, Sofia Brothers Warehouse
- Alternative names: Sofia Apartments

General information
- Type: Condominium
- Architectural style: Art Deco
- Location: 43 West 61st Street, Manhattan, New York, United States
- Coordinates: 40°46′14″N 73°59′00″W
- Construction started: 1929
- Completed: 1930

Height
- Height: 285 ft (87 m)

Technical details
- Structural system: Steel superstructure
- Floor count: 27

Design and construction
- Architect: Jardine, Hill & Murdock
- Sofia Warehouse
- U.S. National Register of Historic Places
- New York State Register of Historic Places
- New York City Landmark
- Area: 14,059 ft^{2} (1,306 m^{2})
- NRHP reference No.: 84002801
- NYSRHP No.: 06101.001770
- NYCL No.: 1239

Significant dates
- Added to NRHP: September 27, 1984
- Designated NYSRHP: August 28, 1984
- Designated NYCL: April 12, 1983

References
- "Emporis building ID 115241". Emporis. Archived from the original on June 24, 2022.

The Sofia (formerly the Kent Automatic Garage and the Sofia Brothers Warehouse) is a condominium building at the corner of Columbus Avenue and 61st Street on the Upper West Side of Manhattan in New York City, United States. It was constructed from 1929 to 1930 and was designed by the firm of Jardine, Hill & Murdock in the Art Deco style for Kent Automatic Garages. The Sofia is 27 stories tall; the first nine stories above the ground level are used as offices, while the top 17 stories contain residential condominiums. The building is a New York City designated landmark and on the National Register of Historic Places.

The building originally functioned as a 1,000-spot garage, with a gas station at the corner of Columbus Avenue and 61st Street. The ground level contains multiple entrances, surrounded by multicolored pieces of terracotta. There was a vehicular entrance on Columbus Avenue and an exit on 61st Street. On the upper floors, the facade is made largely of orange brick, interspersed with bands of black brick, and there are several setbacks with terracotta parapets. The building contains an extremely strong steel superstructure inside. Originally, the building had large vehicular elevators, as well as electric trolleys on each floor, which automatically transported vehicles to parking spots. Since the 1980s, the building has contained 94 apartments, ranging from studio apartments to three-bedroom units.

Kent Automatic Garages bought the site from automobile company Packard in 1928, and the garage opened on July 30, 1930. Kent obtained various loans to finance the building's construction but lost the building to foreclosure within a year. The building was then acquired by the Central Savings Bank in 1936 and by the Sofia Brothers Warehousing Company in 1944. The Sofia family converted the building into a warehouse, though the structure also housed offices and studios. Aaron Green and Growth Realty Companies bought the building for $9.3 million in August 1983 and converted it into a residential and commercial condominium over the next year. College Board occupied the commercial portion of the building from the 1980s until 2015, when Fordham University acquired the commercial space.

== Site ==
The Sofia is at the northeast corner of Columbus Avenue and 61st Street, two blocks northwest of Columbus Circle, on the Upper West Side of Manhattan in New York City, United States. It has two addresses: 45 Columbus Avenue to the west and 43 West 61st Street to the south. The building occupies a rectangular land lot of 14,059 ft^{2} (1,306 m^{2}), with a frontage of 144 ft (44 m) on Columbus Avenue and 100 ft (30 m) on 61st Street. The building originally surrounded a gas station at the corner of Columbus Avenue and 61st Street.

The surrounding section of Columbus Avenue contains many residential buildings, including a 30-story apartment house directly north of the Sofia. The building is on the same block as Park Loggia to the east, and it faces the Fordham University School of Law to the west. In addition, the David H. Koch Theater of the Lincoln Center performing-arts complex is one block north.

== Architecture ==
The Sofia was designed by Jardine, Hill & Murdock and was built for Kent Automatic Garages as a parking garage. The building was designed in the Art Deco style and is the only building that Jardine, Hill & Murdock is known to have designed in that style. It is also the only large Art Deco parking garage that is known to have been constructed in New York City. The modern structure is 27 stories high and contains both residences and offices. Historically, the building has been cited as having 24, 25, or 26 stories. The building's main roof is 242 ft (74 m) above ground level, while its pinnacle is 285 ft (87 m) high.

=== Facade ===
==== Lower stories ====
The Sofia's main entrance, on the Columbus Avenue elevation of the facade, contains a two-story-high frame made of multicolored pieces of terracotta. The main entrance is extremely wide because, when the building was used as a garage, the main entrance was used as an entry ramp for vehicles. The modern-day entrance functions as a doorway to the offices inside the building. Immediately above the entryway are multicolored Art Deco chevrons and medallions, which are inspired by Aztec designs. The two-story frame on Columbus Avenue is flanked by black bands of brick. A similar band, decorated with chevrons, runs above the third floor.

The 61st Street side also contained a wide exit ramp from the garage. There are also one- and two-story terracotta frames on 61st Street, which originally led to the offices but later led to the residences. From 1943 until the early 1980s, the south elevation also had a one-story annex.

==== Upper stories ====
On the upper stories, the facade is divided vertically into multiple bays and is composed of orange bricks. Each story is separated by horizontal courses of black bricks, which run directly below the lintels of the windows. The outer bays contained wide 12-paned metal sash windows, originally divided into a transom above and a hopper below. The three center bays contain smaller sash windows, separated vertically by slightly projecting piers. The Columbus Avenue elevation has setbacks with parapets at the 15th, 22nd, and 25th stories; there is also a parapet just below the roof. Each of the parapets is decorated with blue-and-white terracotta as well as cast stone ornament, which resemble the decoration above the main entrance. Above the 15th story, the windows on different stories are separated by spandrel panels with black horizontal or vertical bands. The three center bays are articulated with projecting vertical piers of brick, which end at terracotta parapets. The windows on the Columbus Avenue elevation were widened in the 1980s.

The south elevation on 61st Street was originally a blank wall without windows. The original plans indicate that the south elevation was supposed to have setbacks complementing those on the northern elevation, but those setbacks were never built. Windows were added in the 1980s after the building was designated as a landmark. The 61st Street elevation contains horizontal bands, which are continuations of the bands on the Columbus Avenue elevation. The center of the wall contains a projecting pavilion, which formerly housed the garage's elevator shafts and is one bay deep. It is decorated with black geometric ornamentation. Adjacent to this pavilion, there were steel-and-concrete balconies on each story, connected by an emergency-exit stair tower.

The black bands of the facade wrap around to the east and north elevations. There are three window bays in the center of the east elevation. The north elevation has very few windows.

=== Interior ===
The steel superstructure was constructed by Post & McCord. Because it was originally used as a parking garage, the Sofia was built as a fireproof structure with an extremely strong frame. Originally, the building had 1,000 parking spaces. Drivers would leave their vehicles in front of a large elevator at the ground level, where an elevator operator would move the vehicle to a floor with an open parking space. There were three elevators, each of which could fit two cars; this was later expanded to four elevators. Once on that floor, the operator would then push a button to operate a conveyor belt with a small electric carriage. The carriage was then pushed beneath the vehicle and engaged with the rear axle. The New York Times estimated that cars could travel between ground level and the top floor in 90 seconds and that five cars could be delivered from the upper floors to the ground level every minute. Except for the elevator operator, there were no employees above the first floor, nor were any personnel allowed on the parking floors.

When the Sofia was converted into a condominium, it was divided into 94 units, each covering between 580 and 2,200 ft^{2} (54 and 204 m^{2}). There are 21 studio apartments, 30 one-bedroom apartments, 40 two-bedroom apartments, and 3 three-bedroom apartments. Ten of the apartments are duplexes, including two penthouse apartments that cover 2,000 and 2,200 ft^{2} (190 and 200 m^{2}), respectively. Additionally, twenty apartments have outdoor terraces; the western penthouse has a terrace covering 1,000 ft^{2} (93 m^{2}), while the eastern penthouse has a terrace covering 2,300 ft^{2} (210 m^{2}). Kitchens and master bathrooms contain marble decoration, and the apartments also contain furnishings and wooden paneling in the Art Deco style. During the condo conversion, the Sofia's marketing specialist traveled to London to research interior designs of large apartment buildings. The specialist recommended including European-style tubs and fixtures in the bathrooms; as such, many of the bathrooms are larger than the master bedrooms.

== History ==
During the late 19th century, the site of the Sofia was within San Juan Hill, a primarily Black neighborhood with many tenement houses, and the Ninth Avenue elevated railroad line ran nearby. The section of Ninth Avenue on the Upper West Side was renamed Columbus Avenue in an attempt to improve the neighborhood's reputation. In the 20th century, the surrounding area evolved into Manhattan's "Automobile Row", centered along a stretch of Broadway extending mainly between Times Square at 42nd Street and Sherman Square at 72nd Street. Automobile-related businesses and structures stretched as far west as West End/Eleventh Avenue. These included the Sofia, which adjoined a warehouse and showroom owned by the Packard Motor Company.

=== Use as garage ===
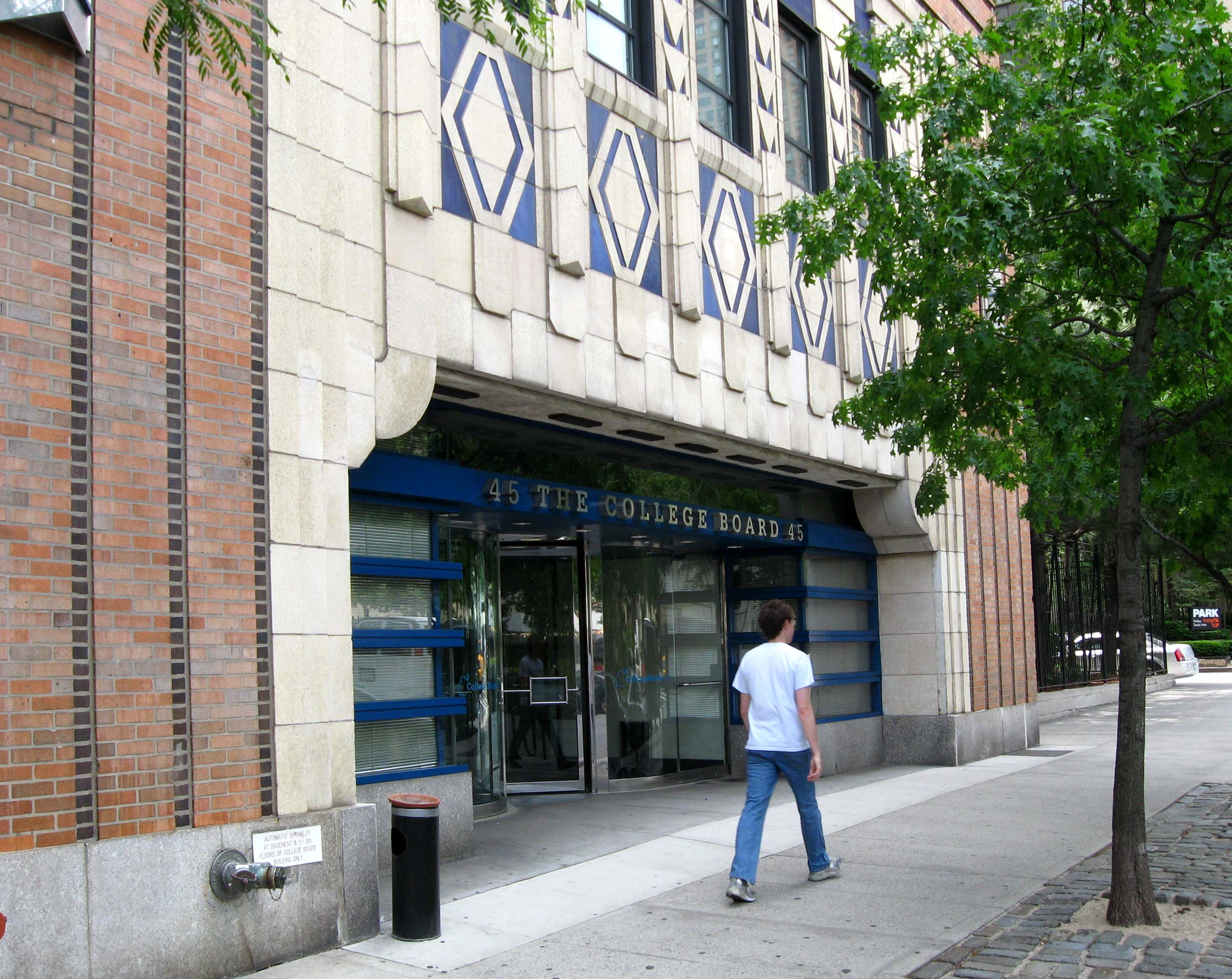
Office building entrance, formerly the entrance ramp to the garage

In October 1928, Packard sold a plot measuring 100 by 140 ft (30 by 43 m), at the northeast corner of 61st Street and Columbus Avenue, to Kent Automatic Garages. The site would contain the Kent company's second high-rise "automatic parking garage"; the first garage had been built on 43rd Street, near Grand Central Terminal in Midtown Manhattan. Both garages had been devised by life-insurance salesman Milton A. Kent, who planned to build a chain of high-rise garages across the United States. The project received a $700,000 mortgage loan in February 1929, replacing a temporary loan on the site. Jardine, Murdock & Wright filed plans for the garage in July 1929, and Kent Columbus Circle Garage Inc. received a $900,000 mortgage loan for the garage's construction that October. The superstructure topped out during January 1930. The two mortgage loans for the project were consolidated into one loan of $800,000 that April.

The 61st Street garage opened on July 30, 1930, when New York City Police Department officials attended a demonstration of the new technology. The Kent Company originally charged 50 cents for two hours of parking (equivalent to $9 in 2025) and 5 cents for every hour thereafter; the monthly fee was $30 (equivalent to $563 in 2025). The rates were higher than those offered by many of the company's competitors. Like the 43rd Street garage, the new 61st Street garage could accommodate 1,500 to 2,000 vehicles per day. In late 1930, Jardine, Murdock & Wright filed plans for a 15-story office structure adjacent to the garage, which would be connected to the garage's steel superstructure.

Kent Columbus Circle obtained a permanent mortgage loan in April 1931, but the firm had trouble making mortgage payments by that August. The next month, Kent announced plans to reorganize its businesses, and Fred T. Ley moved to foreclose on the 43rd and 61st Street garages. Ley took over the garages that November for about $1.6 million. The Columbus Realty Corporation, led by William Everdell, acquired the garage in October 1932. The next year, Fred W. Moe of the Ramp Buildings Corporation took over the garage's operation. Columbus Realty itself defaulted on its mortgage payments, and the Central Savings Bank foreclosed on the garage. In December 1936, the bank purchased the garage at a nominal price of $10,000. At the time, the garage was valued at $1.09 million.

=== Use as warehouse ===
In January 1944, the Sofia Brothers Warehousing Company acquired the Kent Parking Garage with plans to convert the building into a storage warehouse. George E. Kingsley designed the conversion, and he filed a set of alteration plans for the building in 1949. The Sofia Brothers removed the automated parking equipment in the process. The Sofia Brothers also sealed off the vehicular entrance on Columbus Avenue and advertised the building as the "World's Tallest Storage Warehouse". The building then housed the offices of the Sofia Brothers, as well as the Sofia family's T & J Management Company, which managed several buildings in Manhattan and the Bronx. The Arthur Ross Auction Galleries also hosted auctions for furniture and art at the warehouse. The Sofia Brothers refinanced the building with a $520,000 mortgage loan in 1953.

Tenants during the 1950s included the Underwood Corporation, which sold business machines, and De Luxe Pictures, which leased some space for film storage. The Public Service Mutual Insurance Company also had offices in the building until the mid-1960s, and HBO predecessor Manhattan Cable Television operated a studio within the building in the early 1970s. Art dealer Leo Castelli relocated his Castelli Gallery to the building in the early 1980s, branding it as "Castelli at Lincoln Center". By the early 1980s, the Sofia family was considering selling the building, prompting the New York City Landmarks Preservation Commission (LPC) to consider designating the old Kent Garage as an official landmark. The Sofia family supported the designation, as did the prospective buyers. The building was designated as a city landmark on April 12, 1983, making it one of a few garages in New York City to be designated as such.

=== Condominium conversion ===
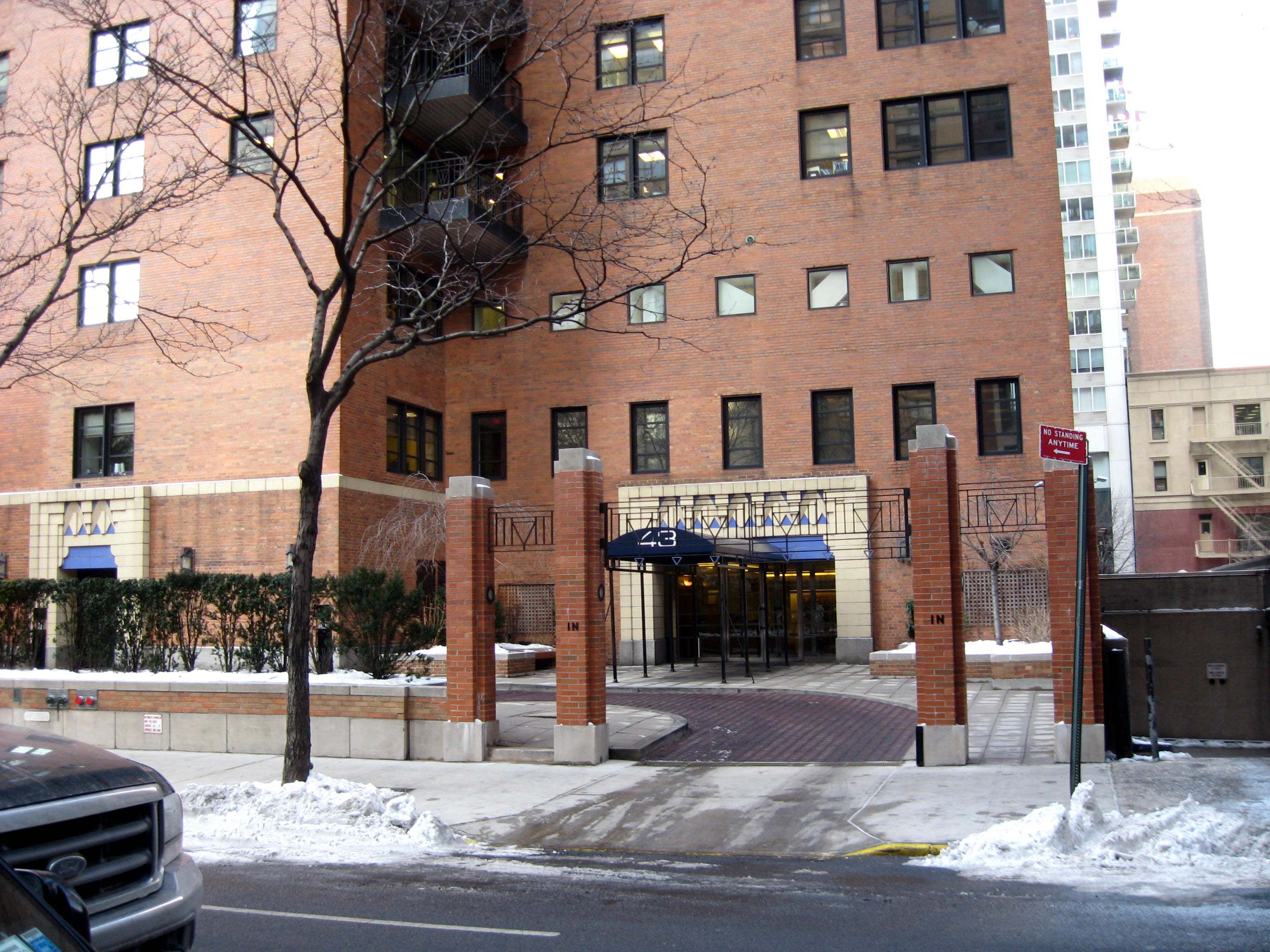
Entrance to the apartment house, formerly the garage exit

Aaron Green and Growth Realty Companies bought the building for $9.3 million in August 1983. The buyers converted the Kent Garage building into the Sofia, a residential condominium with 94 units on the top 17 stories. The nine stories immediately above the lobby were converted into a 65,000 ft^{2} (6,000 m^{2}) office condominium, which was sold to the College Board. The conversion was designed by the firms of Allan Lapidus; Abraham Rothenberg Associates; and Rothzeid, Kaiserman, Thomson & Bee. The development was originally marketed as the "Sofia at Lincoln Center". After the performing arts complex's president Nathan Leventhal pointed out that it was illegal to brand structures outside Lincoln Center as being "at Lincoln Center", the developers changed this to "Sofia Opposite Lincoln Center".

The developers put a sign on the building in early May 1984 to gauge public interest in the building's condominiums. Within three weeks, over 400 people had called the development office to ask about the condominiums. The first units were marketed in June 1984, and four-fifths of the apartments had been sold by October, with prices varying between $200,000 and $1.5 million. This put the price of each apartment at about $350/ft^{2} ($3,800/m^{2}). The conversion cost $40 million in total. It was one of several projects that were completed near Columbus Circle in the mid-1980s. At the time, the amount of storage space in Manhattan was declining, as several storage warehouses had been converted into condominiums. The building was also listed on the National Register of Historic Places in 1984.

Following the conversion, the building's residents have included actor Richard Belzer. College Board leased space in another building in 2014, and Fordham University acquired College Board's portion of the building the same year for $49.6 million. Fordham relocated the offices of 18 departments into the building in July 2015. The space contained two additional classrooms, meeting rooms, a board room, and a private garden for the university.

== See also ==
- Art Deco architecture of New York City
- List of New York City Designated Landmarks in Manhattan from 59th to 110th Streets
- National Register of Historic Places listings in Manhattan from 59th to 110th Streets
