= Mario Gabelli =

American billionaire businessman

Mario Joseph Gabelli
- Born: June 19, 1942 (age 84); The Bronx, New York, U.S.
- Education: Fordham University; Columbia Business School
- Occupations: Founder, chairman, and CEO of Gabelli Asset Management Company Investors
- Children: 4

Mario Joseph Gabelli (born June 19, 1942) is an American stock investor, investment advisor, and financial analyst. He is the founder, chairman, and CEO of Gabelli Asset Management Company Investors (Gamco Investors), an investment firm headquartered in Rye, New York.

Forbes magazine listed him as #1725 in December 2023 on its list of billionaires, with a net worth of $1.7 billion US. In January 2000, Gabelli was included on the Barron's All Century Team, their list of the most influential mutual fund industry portfolio managers. He was named an honorary member of Local 6 and the Hotel Trades Council in December 2019, and was formally inducted into the Horatio Alger Association of Distinguished Americans in April 2020.

== Early life and education ==
Gabelli, the son of Italian immigrants, was born in The Bronx and went to Fordham Preparatory School, where he graduated in 1961. He has said he read market reports for fun when he was very young and that he bought his first stock when he was 13 years old.

Gabelli won a scholarship and graduated from Fordham University summa cum laude in 1965. He received his Master of Business Administration degree from Columbia Business School. At Columbia, he was taught by Roger Murray, noted value investing professor and co-author of the Fifth Edition of Security Analysis, The Graham & Dodd Value Investing Bible. Gabelli and his firm later launched the Graham & Dodd, Murray, Greenwald Award for Distinguished Value Investors. This award is presented yearly at his annual client symposium.

== Investment career ==
=== Loeb, Rhoades & Co. ===
After graduation, Gabelli accepted a position at Loeb, Rhoades & Co. as a security analyst responsible for coverage of farm equipment, auto parts conglomerates and later media and broadcasting. He put into practice the theory of value investing he had learned at Columbia. He rated companies not by earnings but cash flow, analyzing a firm in great detail to calculate what he called private-market value: not the share price at which a stock was selling on an exchange, but the price per share someone would be willing to pay in order to buy the whole company.

=== Gabelli & Co. ===
In 1976, Gabelli formed Gabelli & Co., an institutional brokerage house, with borrowed funds and money he had accumulated trading his own account. Soon after, he formed Gabelli Investors (later Gamco Investors) to manage money for clients.

=== The Gabelli Mutual Funds ===
Gabelli's first investment vehicle for the general public, the Gabelli Asset Fund, launched in March 1986 as a no-load fund requiring a minimum of $25,000 to invest. Today, this fund is available for a minimum investment of $1,000 and accepts IRA investments without a minimum. The Asset Fund was followed by the Gabelli Equity Trust, a closed-end fund, which, at the time, was the largest equity offering on the NYSE. By the end of 1988, Gabelli's firm had three mutual funds—two run by himself—with combined assets of $650 million. By 1998, Gabelli Asset Management Inc. was managing $16.3 billion. In February 1999, the company went public, selling 6 million shares, or about twenty percent of the common stock, at $17.50 per share.

In 1997, when ten Gabelli equity funds averaged a return of 31.7 percent, the best of any U.S. mutual fund group, Gabelli was honored by Morningstar, Inc. as the domestic equity fund manager of the year.

The Institutional Investor chose Gabelli as 2010 Money Manager of the Year for its second annual U.S. Investment Management Awards. The selection was based on performance as well as a survey by U.S. institutions.

== Wealth and philanthropy ==
Signators of The Giving Pledge, Gabelli and his wife Regina joined the cause in 2017, which is a commitment by the world's wealthiest individuals and families to dedicate the majority of their wealth to giving back. According to Forbes magazine, Gabelli's net worth was $1.4 billion as of April 2020.

=== The Buoniconti Fund to Cure Paralysis ===
In September 2025, Gabelli was given the Outstanding Philanthropist Award at the 40th Annual Great Sports Legends Dinner. The dinner benefits the Buoniconti Fund to Cure Paralysis, and raises awareness and millions of dollars for research and treatment of paralysis and other neurological diseases and disorders.

=== Broadcasting & Cable Hall of Fame ===
On September 26, 2024, Gabelli was given the Chairmans Award and was inducted into the B&C Hall of Fame Class of 2024. The B&C Hall of Fame honors pioneers, creators, investors and financial supporters of the media. Gabelli's engagement and financial support has contributed to significant growth of the industry.

=== American-Italian Cancer Foundation ===
On November 8, 2023, Gabelli was given the Alessandro di Montezemolo Lifetime Achievement Award. Established in honor of Alessandro di Montezemolo, co-founder of the American-Italian Cancer Foundation, the award recognizes outstanding individuals who exemplify the highest standards of commitment to philanthropy. Di Montezemolo's motto was "you make a living by what you do - you make a life by what you give" Gabelli has been on the AICF Board of Directors since 2000.

=== The National Judicial College ===
On September 28, 2023, Gabelli was honored by the National Judicial College with the "Making the World a More Just Place" award. Created more than a half-century ago at the recommendation of a U.S. Supreme Court justice, the National Judicial College, based in Reno, Nevada since 1964, remains the only educational institution in the United States that teaches courtroom skills to judges of all types.

=== Iona University ===
In February 2023, Gabelli established an endowed professorship in finance at the LePenta School of Business. He also made a pledge to advance strategic initiatives on Iona's new campus in Bronxville, home to the NewYork-Presbyterian Iona School of Health Sciences.

=== Horatio Alger Award ===
In April 2022, during the Association's 73rd Horatio Alger Award Induction Ceremonies in Washington, D.C., Gabelli was inducted into Horatio Alger Association of Distinguished Americans and received the Horatio Alger Award. The association is a nonprofit educational organization honoring the achievements of outstanding individuals and encouraging youth to pursue their dreams through higher education. For more than 70 years, the annual award has been bestowed upon esteemed individuals who have succeeded despite facing adversities, and who have remained committed to higher education and charitable efforts in their communities.

=== St. John's University ===
In July 2025, Gabelli made a $1.5 million contribution to St. John's University to establish the Mario Gabelli Endowed Chair at St. John's University to support the continued growth and academic standing of the Peter J. Tobin College of Business.

=== Case Western Reserve University ===
In October 2022, Gabelli made a $2 million contribution to Case Western Reserve University to establish the Mario J. Gabelli Distinguished Professorship in Finance. Case Western celebrated the inaugural chairholder at a campus ceremony on October 12, 2022.

=== Pace University ===
On July 1, 2021, Gabelli, through his Gabelli Foundation, Inc., contributed $1.5 million to establish the Gabelli Endowed Anthony R. Pustorino Distinguished Professorship in Accounting, a restricted endowment at Pace University. The fund supports, in perpetuity, a named professor in the Lubin School of Business Accounting Department.

=== University of Nevada, Reno ===
In December 2013, the University of Nevada, Reno announced that it had received a $1.5 million donation from the Gabelli Foundation to help pay for the construction of the E. L. Wiegand Fitness Center. Gabelli is a member of the Wiegand Foundation's board of trustees.

=== Columbia Graduate Business School ===
In July 2013, the Gabelli Foundation pledged $15 million, earmarked for the construction of Columbia Business School's new Manhattanville campus. The building was scheduled to open in 2018.

=== Columbus Day Parade ===
On October 8, 2012, Gabelli was grand marshall of the New York City's 68th Annual Columbus Day Parade, the world's largest celebration of Italian-American culture and heritage.

=== Fordham University ===
Among those recognized at the 2010 Fordham University Founder's Award Dinner were Mario J. Gabelli, CBA '65, and Regina M. Pitaro, FCRH '76, a Fordham trustee and managing director of Gamco Asset Management. In September 2010, Fordham formally announced Gabelli's $25 million gift, the largest ever in the university's history. The gift allowed Fordham, which renamed the undergraduate business college the Gabelli School of Business, to expand student scholarships and faculty chairs, and was crucial to the creation of the Center of Global Investment Analysis, which brings together students, faculty and professionals in the financial community to enhance scholarship in the study and understanding of capital markets. In 2014, Gabelli funded the university's Gabelli Ph.D. Program, which will establish a doctoral-level business program at Fordham's Gabelli School of Business. In December 2020, Fordham announced that Gabelli, through the Gabelli Foundation, had made the largest gift in the university's history, a $35 million gift to support the business school that bears his name.

=== Boston College ===
In September 2010, Boston College announced Gabelli's $3 million gift that was used to endow a professorship in finance in the college's Carroll School of Management. An undergraduate dormitory is also named after Gabelli because of a past donation to the school. Gabelli, who serves on the college's board of trustees, previously gave $10 million to create the Gabelli Distinguished Presidential Scholars Fund, which provides fifteen students with full tuition every year. In 2012, Alan Marcus was named as the first recipient of the Endowed Professorship. In 2014, Boston College's Presidential Scholars Program was renamed the Gabelli Presidential Scholars Program, as a result of a major gift from the Gabelli Family Foundation. In December 2015, the foundation made a contribution to Boston College to further the Foundation's commitment to the Jesuit philosophy of enhancing the intellectual, spiritual and physical aspects of the whole person.

=== Roger Williams University - Mario J. Gabelli School of Business ===
The Roger Williams University Mario J. Gabelli School of Business was established in 1995, three years after the university conferred an honorary doctor of business degree on Gabelli. Gabelli has continued to support the school through additional financial pledges.

=== University of Miami ===
In 2011, a gift from Gabelli enabled the Miami Herbert Business School to establish a new endowed professorship.

=== NYC Local 6 and the Hotel Trades Council ===
At the December 2019 meeting of the Local 6 Delegate Assembly, the union bestowed an honorary membership to Gabelli, whose support for the Hotel Trades Council's scholarship fund has allowed for more awards and larger grants. His father, Joseph Gabelli, was a charter member of both Local 6 and the Hotel Trades Council.

=== Ellis Island Foundation ===
Gabelli received the 1996 Ellis Island Medal of Honor for Business Leaders. The Ellis Island Honors Society awards the medal to celebrate "inspiring Americans who are selflessly working for the betterment of our country and its citizens." The society describes medal recipients as the "best of America in their celebration of patriotism, diversity and the contributions immigrants continue to make to our nation's economic and social success."

== Legal issues ==
=== Mancheski v. Gabelli Group Capital Partners - investor lawsuit ===
Frederick J. Mancheski, who was Gabelli's first investor in 1976, and David M. Perlmutter, a former attorney for Gabelli brought a lawsuit alleging that Gabelli had prevented them from selling at fair market value their stake in his company. In March 2006, a judge awarded partial summary judgment in favor of claims that he had unfairly prevented Mancheski from selling his shares. The settlement was $100 million. In the ensuing settlement, GGCP distributed assets on a pari passu basis including nearly two million shares of NYSE listed Gamco and approximately $20 million in cash.

=== US Ex Rel. Taylor v. Gabelli - wireless spectrum auction fraud ===
The US Government picked up a complaint filed by Rufus Taylor III alleging that Gabelli and 38 other entities or individuals that participated in a scheme to use "sham" small-business affiliates to fraudulently buy parts of the U.S. cell-phone spectrum. The alleged scheme operated over the course of eight Federal Communications Commission auctions from 1995 to 2000. In 2001, whistleblower Rufus Taylor III filed a civil lawsuit against several companies owned by Gabelli, alleging fraudulent practices in FCC auctions. The suit had alleged that the Gabelli-backed false "entrepreneurs" included an NBA player, a related party, a former partner of an accounting firm, an aerobics instructor, and the caretaker of a vacation home in part owned by Gabelli. In those auctions, the government set aside cell phone licenses to be sold to small businesses. Taylor's lawsuit said that Gabelli used more than twelve "sham" startup companies to meet the requirements of a small business applicant in the auctions and acquire the licenses at a small business discount. The whistleblower was an attorney who once worked in the telecommunications business for LICT's competitor Adelphia, which went bankrupt. On July 12, 2006, Gabelli and affiliates agreed to pay $130 million to settle the lawsuit. Gabelli's money management business, Gamco Investors, was not a party to the lawsuit. The head of the FCC and his successor agreed that there was no problem.

== Personal life ==
Gabelli lives with his second wife, Regina Pitaro. He and his first wife, Elaine, the mother of his four children, divorced before 1996.

Two of his sons are on the board of directors of Gamco; his daughter manages the Gabelli Foundation.
