= GAMCO Investors =

Provider of brokerage services to mutual funds and investors based in New York

GAMCO Investors, Inc
- Company type: Public
- Traded as: OTCQX: GAMI; Russell 2000 Index component
- Industry: Financial services
- Founded: 1976
- Founder: Mario Gabelli
- Headquarters: Rye, New York, United States
- Key people: Mario Gabelli (CEO and Chairman)
- Services: Investment adviser, Brokerage firm
- AUM: US$31.1 billion (December 31, 2023)
- Owner: Mario Gabelli (72%)
- Divisions: Gabelli Funds
- Website: www.gabelli.com

GAMCO Investors, Inc., formerly known as Gabelli Asset Management Company, is an American provider of investment advice and brokerage services to mutual funds, institutional and select investors based in Rye, New York. It was founded by and is majority owned by Mario Gabelli, who has cumulatively earned more than $750 million in compensation from the company.

== History ==
The company was founded in 1976 to provide discretionary investment services to a broad spectrum of investors. In February 1999, the company held an IPO on the New York Stock Exchange under the symbol GBL. Per an agreement with the company upon its IPO, Mario Gabelli received 10 percent of its pretax profits in compensation.

In August 2005, the company elevated the brand name 'GAMCO' from its asset management business to become the name of the entire company.

== Lawsuits and Investigations ==
In 1992, Gabelli and GAMCO were under an investigation by the Federal Communications Commission that was later settled.

In March 2006, a judge determined Mario Gabelli had unfairly prevented Frederick J. Mancheski, a long time investment partner, and David M. Perlmutter, Gabelli's former lawyer, from selling their shares in Gabelli Group Capital Partners at fair market value. In the settlement, Gabelli paid the couple $100 million that would amount to a total of 2.1 million GAMCO shares, then worth about $80 million, and more than $20 million in cash.

Also in 2006, Gabelli faced a civil investigation from the U.S. Department of Justice as to whether he purposefully deceived the FCC when bidding to purchase segments of the wireless spectrum. The company, along with Gabelli, agreed to a settlement in June 2006.

The company offered to settle an investigation by the U.S. Securities and Exchange Commission in exchange for $3 million in 2007.
