= List of assets owned by Skydance =

The following is a list of major assets that are owned by American multinational media conglomerate Skydance.

== Skydance Studios ==
=== Skydance Motion Picture Group ===
- Paramount Pictures
  - Paramount Animation
  - Paramount Primal
  - Republic Pictures
  - Nickelodeon Movies
  - Paramount Music
  - Paramount Studio Group – physical studio and post-production
    - The Studios at Paramount – production facilities & lot
    - Paramount on Location – production support facilities throughout North America including New York, Vancouver, and Atlanta
    - Worldwide Technical Operations – archives, restoration and preservation programs, the mastering and distribution fulfillment services, on-lot post-production facilities management
- Warner Bros. Entertainment
  - Warner Bros. Pictures
    - Warner Bros. Pictures Animation
      - Swaybox Studios
  - New Line Cinema
  - Warner Bros. Clockwork
  - Castle Rock Entertainment (brand, trademark and back library)
  - Warner Bros. Film Productions Germany
  - Warner Bros. Studio Facilities
    - Warner Bros. Museum
    - Warner Bros. Studios Burbank
    - Warner Bros. Studios Leavesden
    - Warner Bros. International Dubbing & Subtitling
  - Warner Bros. Digital Networks
    - Warner Bros. Digital Labs
    - OneFifty
    - Sports & Entertainment Digital Network
    - Warner Bros. Digital & Online
    - Warner Bros. Podcast Network
  - Warner Bros. Theatre Ventures
  - Warner Bros. Japan
    - Warner Bros. Japan Anime Production
  - WaterTower Music
  - Turner Classic Movies
  - Turner Entertainment Co. - in-name unit only serving as the copyright holder for a portion of the Warner Bros. library
  - Cartoon Network Enterprises - in-name unit only
  - Wolper Organization
- Spyglass Media Group (minority stake)
- Flagship Entertainment Group (with China Media Capital (41%) and TVB (10%))
- DC Studios
- Skydance Animation
  - Skydance Animation Madrid
- Miramax (49%, co-owned with beIN Media Group)
  - Miramax Family & Animation
  - Miramax Television
- Skydance Pictures Distribution
  - Skydance Pictures Domestic Distribution (North American exhibition)
  - Skydance Pictures International (International distribution)
- Skydance Home Entertainment (Planned merger)
  - Paramount Home Entertainment
    - CBS Home Entertainment
    - Paramount Presents
  - Warner Bros. Home Entertainment
    - Warner Archive Collection
    - Discovery Home Entertainment
    - Skydance Anti-Piracy Operations

=== Skydance Products & Publishing ===
- DC Comics
  - Hill House Comics
  - DC Black Label
  - DC Graphic Novels for Kids
  - DC Graphic Novels for Young Adults
  - DC Universe Infinite
  - DC's Young Animal
  - MAD
  - Milestone Media
  - Murphyverse
  - Sandman Universe
  - Vertigo Comics
  - WildStorm
  - Wonder Comics
- Paws, Inc.
- Paramount Global Publishing
- Warner Bros. Discovery Publications

=== Skydance Experiences ===
- Paramount Themed Entertainment
  - Paramount Parks & Resorts – licensing and design for parks and resorts
- Paramount Consumer Products
  - Paramount Games Studio
  - Paramount Shop
  - Paramount Licensing, Inc.
  - Paramount Advertising
- Warner Bros. Discovery Global Themed Entertainment
  - Warner Bros. Theme Parks
    - Parque Warner Madrid (5%)
  - Warner Bros. Studio Tours
    - Warner Bros. Studio Tour Hollywood
    - Warner Bros. Studio Tour London – The Making of Harry Potter
    - Warner Bros. Studio Tour Tokyo - The Making of Harry Potter
    - Warner Bros. Studio Tour Shanghai - The Making of Harry Potter
- Warner Bros. Discovery Global Consumer Products
  - Warner Bros. Games
    - Avalanche Software
    - NetherRealm Studios
    - Portkey Games
    - Rocksteady Studios
    - TT Games
      - TT Games Publishing
      - TT Fusion
      - Traveller's Tales
      - TT Odyssey
    - WB Games Boston
    - WB Games Montréal
    - WB Games New York
    - WB Games San Francisco

== Skydance TV ==
=== Skydance Television Studios Group ===
- Warner Bros. Television Studios
  - WBTVS Scripted Production
    - Alloy Entertainment
    - BET Studios
    - Nickelodeon Productions
  - WBTVS Unscripted Production
    - Telepictures
      - Telepictures Music
      - DC All Access
      - True Crime News
    - Warner Horizon Unscripted Television
    - Shed Media
  - Warner Bros. International Television Production
    - WBITVP UK
      - Renegade Pictures
      - Ricochet
      - Twenty Twenty Television
      - Wall to Wall Media
    - WBITVP Australia
    - WBITVP Belgium
    - WBITVP Denmark
    - WBITVP Finland
    - WBITVP France
    - WBITVP Germany
    - WBITVP Italy
    - WBITVP Netherlands
      - BlazHoffski
      - Dahl TV
      - Eyeworks Film & Drama
      - Hollands Licht
    - WBITVP New Zealand
    - WBITVP Spain & Portugal
    - WBITVP Sweden
    - WBITVP Switzerland
  - Bonanza Productions
  - NS Pictures
  - Warner Bros. Television Workshop
  - Creative Group
- CBS Studios
  - CBS Studios International
  - Big Ticket Television
  - See It Now Studios
  - Skydance Sports Entertainment
    - Skydance Sports
- Skydance Global Content Sales
  - Warner Bros. Domestic Television Distribution
  - Warner Bros. International Television Distribution

=== CBS Entertainment Group ===
- CBS
- CBS Media Ventures
  - CBS Media Ventures Media Sales
  - Dabl (operated by Weigel Broadcasting)
- CBS News
  - CBS News 24/7
  - CBS MoneyWatch
- The CW (18.9%; with Nexstar Media Group)
  - The CW Plus (secondary national broadcast syndication service feed)
  - The CW (FAST streaming service)
- CBS Television Stations
  - KCBS-TV 2 / KCAL-TV 9 Los Angeles
  - KOVR 13 / KMAX-TV 31 Sacramento – Stockton – Modesto, California
  - KPIX-TV 5 / KPYX 44 San Francisco – Oakland – San Jose, California
  - KCNC-TV 4 Denver, Colorado
  - WFOR-TV 4 / WBFS-TV 33 Miami–Fort Lauderdale, Florida
  - WTOG 44 St. Petersburg – Tampa, Florida
  - WUPA 69 Atlanta
  - WBBM-TV 2 Chicago
  - WBXI-CD 47 Indianapolis
  - WJZ-TV 13 Baltimore
  - WBZ-TV 4 / WSBK-TV 38 Boston
  - WWJ-TV 62 / WKBD-TV 50 Detroit / Windsor, Ontario
  - WCCO-TV 4 / KCCW-TV 12 Minneapolis–Saint Paul — Walker, Minnesota
  - WCBS-TV 2 / WLNY-TV 55 Riverhead – New York City
  - KYW-TV 3 / WPSG 57 Philadelphia
  - KDKA-TV 2 / WPKD-TV 19 Jeannette – Pittsburgh, Pennsylvania
  - KTVT 11 / KTXA 21 Fort Worth – Dallas
  - KSTW 11 Tacoma – Seattle
  - Start TV (a 50% JV with Weigel Broadcasting)
  - Dabl (Operated by Weigel Broadcasting)
- CBS Local Digital
  - CBS News New York
  - CBS News Los Angeles
  - CBS News Boston
  - CBS News Bay Area
  - CBS News Minnesota
  - CBS News Philadelphia
  - CBS News Colorado
  - CBS News Pittsburgh
  - CBS News Chicago
  - CBS News Texas
  - CBS News Sacramento
  - CBS News Baltimore
  - CBS News Miami
  - CBS News Detroit
- CBS Broadcast Center
- Ed Sullivan Theater

=== Skydance Global Cable Media ===
==== Unscripted Lifestyle ====
- Discovery Channel
  - Discovery en Español
- HGTV
  - Hogar de HGTV
- Magnolia Network (joint venture with Chip and Joanna Gaines’ XVI, LLC)
- Television Food Network, G.P. (69% with Nexstar Media Group)
  - Food Network
  - Cooking Channel
  - Food.com

==== Broad-Based Entertainment ====
- Investigation Discovery
- TBS
- TNT
- TLC
- TruTV

==== Talent, Music and Live ====
- BET Media Group
  - BET
  - BET Gospel
  - BET Hip-Hop
  - BET Her
  - BET Jams
  - BET Soul
  - BET Digital
- BET Content, alternatively known as BET Creative Programming
- MTV Entertainment Group
  - CMT
    - CMT Music
  - Logo
  - MTV
    - MTV2
    - MTV Classic
    - MTV Live
    - MTVU
    - Tr3s
  - Paramount Network (trade name of Spike Cable Networks Inc.)
  - Pop TV
  - Smithsonian Channel
  - TV Land
  - VH1
- Oprah Winfrey Network (95% with Harpo Productions)

==== Comedy and Animation ====
- Comedy Central (trade name of Comedy Partners)
- Skydance Television Animation
  - The Cartoon Network, Inc.
    - Cartoon Network
      - Adult Swim
        - Toonami
    - Boomerang
  - CBS Eye Animation Productions
  - Nickelodeon Group
    - Nickelodeon
      - Nick at Nite
    - Nick Jr.
      - Nick Jr. Channel
    - Nicktoons
    - TeenNick
    - NickMusic
  - Nickelodeon Animation Studios
    - Avatar Studios
    - Nickelodeon Digital
  - South Park Digital Studios (joint venture with Park County)
  - Warner Bros. Animation
    - Cartoon Network Studios
    - Hanna-Barbera Studios Europe
  - Williams Street

==== Other assets ====
- American Heroes Channel
- Animal Planet
- Destination America
- Discovery Adventures (out-of-home brand)
- Discovery at Sea (joint venture with Princess Cruises)
- Discovery Family (60% with Hasbro)
  - Discovery Familia
- Discovery Digital Studios
- Discovery Life
- Discovery Studios
- Discovery Turbo
- Travel Channel
- Science Channel

=== Skydance Global Sports Group ===
- CBS Sports
  - CBS Sports Network
  - CBS Sports HQ
  - CBS Sports Golazo Network
  - CBS Sports Digital
    - 247Sports
    - CBSSports.com
  - CBS Local Sports
- TNT Sports
  - TNT Sports Interactive
    - NCAA.com (joint venture with the NCAA)
    - PGA.com (joint venture with PGA of America)
    - Bleacher Report (website)
      - House of Highlights (social media network)
  - MLB Network (cable channel; 16.67% with Major League Baseball, NBC Sports Group, Charter Communications and Cox Communications)
  - Golf Digest (magazine)
- Eurosport

=== Skydance International Content and Distribution ===
- 6'eren
- Animal Planet
- Boomerang
- Boing (49% with MFE - MediaForEurope)
  - Boing (Africa)
  - K2 (49% with Mediaset)
  - Frisbee (49% with Mediaset)
  - Boing (Italy) (49% with Mediaset)
  - Boing (Spain) (50% with Mediaset España)
- Canal 9
- Cartoon Network
- Adult Swim
- Cartoonito
- Comedy Central
- Discovery Channel
- Giallo
- Nove
- Real Time
- TNT
  - TNT Novelas
  - TNT Series
- TruTV
- Discovery Turbo
- Discovery Kids
- DMAX
- Frii
- Food Network
- HGTV
- Kanal 4
- Kanal 5 (Denmark)
- Kanal 5 (Sweden)
- Kanal 9
- Kanal 11
- Kutonen
- MTV
- Nickelodeon
- Nick Jr.
- Quest
  - Quest Red
- Really
- Paramount Network (Netherlands and Poland)
- Science Channel
- Investigation Discovery
- Travel Channel
- TLC
- Tele 5
- TV5
- TVNorge Gruppen
  - TVNorge
  - FEM
  - MAX
  - VOX
  - Rex (Norwegian TV channel)
- Warner TV

==== United Kingdom & Australia ====
- Channel 5 Broadcasting Limited
  - 5
  - 5Action (formerly Paramount Network)
  - 5Select
  - 5Star
  - 5USA
  - 5 (streaming service)
- Network Ten Pty Limited
  - Network 10
    - ATV Melbourne
    - TEN Sydney
    - TVQ Brisbane
    - ADS Adelaide
    - NEW Perth
  - 10 Comedy (formerly 10 Peach)
  - 10 Drama (formerly 10 Bold)
  - 10 HD
  - 10 (formerly 10 Play)
  - Gecko
  - Nickelodeon Australia (formerly 10 Shake)
- True Crime (with AMC Networks International UK)
  - True Crime +1
- True Crime Xtra (with AMC Networks International UK)
- Legend (with AMC Networks International UK)
  - Legend +1
- LegendXtra (with AMC Networks International UK)
  - LegendXtra +1

==== Other channels ====
- Discovery Home & Health
- Discovery Theater
- Discovery World
- HTV
- Raze
- Golf Channel Latin America
- Space
- Tooncast
- TIS Productions (majority stake)
- Ananey Communications
  - Ego
  - The Food Channel
  - The Travel Channel
  - The Good Life Channel
  - Health Channel
  - Hot Comedy Central
  - Nutz Productions
  - Shamaim Productions
  - Mars Interactive
  - Post Office Post Production & Creative
- Asian Food Network
- JTBC (5.72%)
- World Heritage Channel
- Discovery Japan
  - Animal Planet
  - Cartoon Network
  - Discovery Japan Inc. (joint venture with JCom)
  - Movieplus
  - LaLa TV
  - MONDO TV
  - TABI Channel
- Warner Bros. Discovery India
  - Discovery Tamil
  - Pogo

==== TVN Warner Bros. Discovery ====
- Discovery Historia
- Metro
- TVN Group
  - TVN
  - TVN 7
  - TVN24
    - TVN24 BiS
  - TVN Fabula
  - TVN International
    - TVN International Extra
  - TVN Style
  - TVN Turbo
  - TTV
  - Canal+ Poland (32%; with Canal+ Group and Liberty Global)

== Skydance Direct-to-Consumer ==
- CNN All Access
- Discovery+
- HBO Max
- Paramount+
- Fandango Media (25%; with Versant)
  - Fandango (movie ticketing platform)
  - Fandango (streaming service)
  - INDY Cinema Group
  - MovieTickets.com
  - Rotten Tomatoes
    - Rotten Tomatoes Movieclips
- The Free Press
- FuboTV (undisclosed stake)
- Philo (joint venture with A+E Global Media and AMC Global Media)
- Pluto TV
- SkyShowtime (50%; with Comcast)
- WBTV (FAST streaming channels)

=== Home Box Office ===
- HBO
  - HBO Latino
  - HBO Comedy
  - HBO Drama
  - HBO Movies
  - HBO Hits
  - HBO International
    - HBO Asia
      - HBO Family
      - HBO Hits
      - HBO Signature
    - HBO New Zealand
    - HBO Europe
      - HBO2
      - HBO3
    - HBO Latin America
      - HBO Brasil
      - HBO Caribbean
      - HBO2
      - HBO Plus (HBO+)
      - HBO Family
      - HBO Signature
      - HBO Mundi
      - HBO Pop
      - HBO Xtreme
- Cinemax
  - Cinemax Hits
  - Cinemax Action
  - Cinemax Classics
  - Cinemáx (Spanish-language)
  - Cinemax on Demand
  - Cinemax International
    - Cinemax (Europe)
      - Cinemax 2 (Europe)
    - Cinemax (Latin America)
    - Cinemax (Asia)
- HBO Bulk
- HBO Films
- HBO Documentary Films

=== Showtime Networks ===
Sources:

- Paramount+ with Showtime
  - Showtime 2
  - Showcase
  - SHO×BET
  - Showtime Extreme
  - Showtime Family Zone
  - Showtime Next
  - Showtime Women
- The Movie Channel
  - The Movie Channel Xtra
- Flix

== Miscellaneous ==
=== CNN Worldwide ===
- CNN
  - CNN en Español
  - CNN Business
  - CNN app
- CNN International
- CNN Films
- HLN
- Great Big Story

=== Other assets ===
- All Elite Wrestling (<10%)
- Discovery Private Networks
- Harbor Lights Entertainment
  - Showcase Cinemas (16 United Kingdom locations)
- ParamountPressExpress.com, a hub for Paramount press releases

== Former assets ==
=== Divested ===
- AXS TV (20%) – sold to Anthem Sports & Entertainment in 2019
  - HDNet Movies
- Bellator MMA – Sold to Professional Fighters League in 2023
  - Bellator Kickboxing
- Blockbuster – spun off in 2004
  - DEJ Productions
  - Discovery Zone
  - GameRush
  - Gamestation
  - KPS Video Express
  - Xtra-vision
- CBS Building – purchased by Harbor Group International in 2021
- CBS/Columbia Records – sold to Sony in 1987, renamed Sony Music Entertainment in 1991
  - CBS Records International
  - Columbia House
  - CBS Music Publishing – sold to SBK Entertainment World in 1986
- CBS Educational and Professional Publishing – sold to Harcourt Brace Jovanovich in 1986
  - Praeger Publishers – sold to Greenwood Press
- CBS Eye on People – acquired by Discovery Communications in 1998/1999
- CBS/Fox Video
- CBS Musical Instruments
  - Fender
  - Gemeinhardt
  - Gulbransen
  - Lyon & Healy
  - Rhodes
  - Rodgers
  - Rogers
  - Steinway & Sons
- CBS Outdoor (now Outfront Media) – spun off into an independent real estate investment trust in 2014
  - CBS Outdoor International – sold to Platinum Equity in 2013
  - CBS Outernet – renamed Outfront Media Outernet
- CBS Radio – merged with Entercom (former CBS Corporation shareholders received a 72% stake in Entercom)
  - List of broadcast stations owned by CBS Radio
  - Boston Bruins Radio
  - CBS Altitude Group
  - Eventful
  - New York Yankees Radio
  - New York Yankees
  - Play.it
  - Radio.com
- CBS Studio Center – sold to Hackman Capital Partners and Square Mile Capital Management in 2021
- CBS Telenoticias
- CBS Television City – sold to Hackman Capital Partners in 2018
- CIC Video
- Chilevisión – sold to Vytal Group Ltd. in 2026
- CNET Media Group – sold to Red Ventures in 2020
  - CNET – sold to Ziff Davis in 2024
    - CNET Video
    - Download.com
    - CNET Content Solutions
  - Chowhound – shut down in 2022 and sold to Static Media in October 2023 to revive Chowhound website
  - GameSpot – sold to Fandom, Inc. in 2022
    - Comic Vine
    - GameFAQs
    - Giant Bomb
  - Metacritic – sold to Fandom, Inc. in 2022
  - MetroLyrics
  - TV Guide – sold to Fandom, Inc. in 2022
  - ZDNet – sold to Ziff Davis in 2024
    - TechRepublic
- Decades (50%, with Weigel Broadcasting) – Since fall 2019, Decades is carried on Fox-owned stations in 12 markets as part of a multi-year agreement between Weigel Broadcasting and Fox Television Stations, after switching from CBS-owned stations.
- DreamWorks Pictures – spun off in 2008, currently a label of Amblin Partners. However, Paramount retains the rights to the studio's pre-2011 live-action back-catalog, while the DreamWorks Animation back-catalog is now owned by NBCUniversal.
- Epix – Metro-Goldwyn-Mayer acquired Viacom's stake in the network in 2017
- Famous Music – in-house music publishing arm of Paramount Pictures, sold to Sony/ATV Music Publishing in 2007
- Famous Music Group – sold to American Broadcasting Company in 1974; catalogues currently owned by Universal Music Group
  - Blue Thumb Records
  - Dot Records
- Famous Players – sold to Cineplex Galaxy in 2005
  - Paramount Theater
  - SilverCity
  - Colossus
  - Coliseum
- Fox-Paramount Home Entertainment (Nordic countries, joint venture with Walt Disney Studios Home Entertainment) – shut down in 2020
- GameTrailers – sold to Defy Media; later shut down and sold to IGN
- Home Team Sports – sold to Comcast in 2000/2001 and renamed Comcast SportsNet Mid-Atlantic
- Harmonix
- Ideal Toy Company – sold to View-Master in 1986
  - Creative Playthings – sold to Swing Design
- KVMM-CD – sold to HC2 Holdings in 2019
- Last.fm
- Lifetime – Viacom sold its stake to co-owners Hearst Communications and Capital Cities/ABC Inc. in 1994
- Midwest Sports Channel – acquired by News Corporation in 2000 and renamed Fox Sports Net North
- MTV8 – sold to Sky Italia
- MTV (Asia; 1st incarnation)
- MTV (Brazil; 1st incarnation) (50%; 1996–2009) – sold its stakes back to Abril Radiodifusão around December 2009, branding continued to license until 1 October 2013
- MTV (Canada) (license only) – Closed by Bell Media on December 31, 2024 (New Year's Eve).
- MTV (Taiwan; 1st incarnation)
- Multi Channel Network – 24.99% stake held by Ten Network Holdings sold to Foxtel on January 1, 2019
- MTV Networks on Campus – acquired by Cheddar in May 2018 and used to launch CheddarU
- Neopets – acquired by JumpStart Games in 2014
- Orion Pictures – other stake acquired by Viacom in 1986, subsequently it sold to Metromedia in 1987; currently owned by Amazon (through Amazon MGM Studios).
- Paramount Parks: Closed and sold to Cedar Fair in 2006 not only due to the failure of competition against Disney Experiences and Universal Destinations & Experiences, but also because of the split of Viacom and CBS.
- Pop Culture Media – sold to Savage Ventures in 2024
  - ComicBook.com
  - PopCulture.com
- Porta dos Fundos (51%) – sold back to its co-founders in 2025.
- Prentice Hall – sold to Pearson in 1998
- Rainbow – 30% stake purchased by Viacom in 2011 re-acquired by Iginio Straffi in 2023
  - Gruppo Iven S.p.A.
    - Colorado Film
  - Bardel Entertainment
  - Rainbow CGI
  - Moviement Talent Agency
  - Witty Toys
  - Tridimensional S.r.l.
- RateMyProfessors.com – acquired by Cheddar in October 2018
- Rede Telecine (12.5% each with Disney via Disney Studios, NBCUniversal via Universal Studios, Amazon MGM Studios via Metro-Goldwyn-Mayer; 50% with Grupo Globo via Canais Globo)
- RTL CBS Entertainment – joint venture with RTL Group; acquired by Blue Ant Media and renamed Blue Ant Entertainment, later split up from Blue Ant Media and renamed Rock Entertainment.
  - RTL CBS Extreme – renamed Blue Ant Extreme, then split up from Blue Ant Media and renamed Rock Extreme, later Rock Action while Rock Extreme remains only in Taiwan.
- Rysher Entertainment – assets sold to 2929 Entertainment in 2001; library currently owned by Vine Alternative Investments and distributed by Paramount Global Content Distribution
- SBS MTV – expired the rights and then sold to SBS Media Holdings and later rebranded as SBS M; shut down on May 14, 2025
- Sega: Sold by Paramount Pictures to SCSK Corporation in 1984, but continued to partner with them for the Sonic the Hedgehog live-action movies.
- Showtime Arabia – 21%; co-owned with KIPCO; spun off and merged with Orbit Communications Company to form Orbit Showtime Network in 2009
- Showcase Cinemas (United States) – sold to Kinepolis Group in 2026
- Simon & Schuster – sold to KKR & Co. Inc. in 2023
- Stax Records
- Sundance Channel (now Sundance TV) – sold to Rainbow Media (now AMC Global Media) in 2008
- Super! – sold back to De Agostini in 2026
- Telefe – sold to Grupo Televisión Litoral in 2025
  - Telefe Internacional
  - Telefe Rosario
  - Telefe Córdoba
  - Telefe Santa Fe
  - Mi Telefe
- Telemeter — spun off in 1966 after Gulf+Western bought Paramount; shut down in 1969
- Tempo – sold to Frederick Morton Jr. in 2007
- TriStar Pictures – joint venture with Time Inc.'s (now Warner Bros. Discovery) HBO and Columbia Pictures. In 1985, CBS sold a small percent of TriStar to Columbia and HBO.
- TV Land (Canada) – rebranded as Comedy Gold in 2010 and sold to Bell Media in 2011; shut down in 2019
- UCI Cinemas Brazil – sold to Cia Brasileira de Cinemas in 2026
- United International Pictures – 50%, co-owned with NBCUniversal via Universal Pictures; stake divested by August 22, 2027
- USA Networks (brand; joint venture with Seagram) – sold to Universal Pictures in 1997 and continued to be under Universal Pictures' sister owner NBCUniversal Media Group until 2026; currently owned by Versant
  - USA Network
  - Sci-Fi Channel
- Viacom Cable – sold to TCI in 1995; Ohio systems resold to Time Warner Cable in 1998
- Viacom Radio
- Viacom18 (13.01%) – sold its stake to Reliance Industries in 2024
  - Viacom18 US
  - Viacom18 Media
    - Colors
    - Viacom18 Studios
    - The Indian Film Company
    - JioCinema
- Virgin Interactive Entertainment – US branch sold to Electronic Arts in 1998 and UK branch sold to Interplay
- VidCon – sold to Informa in 2024
- Westwood One – sold to The Gores Group in 2008
- Westinghouse Licensing Corporation - sold to Westinghouse Electric Corporation in 2021
  - Westinghouse Broadcasting Company (Group W)
    - InterStar Releasing (51% controlling stake)
- Xfire

=== Dormant or shuttered ===
- 3net - 3D television channel jointly owned with Sony and IMAX Corporation; operated from 2011 to 2014
- 7food network
- Animal Planet Italy
- Adult Swim (UK & Ireland)
- AT&T SportsNet - shut down on October 21, 2023
  - AT&T SportsNet Pittsburgh - sold to Fenway Sports Group
  - AT&T SportsNet Southwest - sold to a joint venture between the Houston Rockets and Houston Astros (50% stake)
  - AT&T SportsNet Rocky Mountain - ceased operations at the end of 2023
  - Root Sports Northwest (29% stake with Baseball Club of Seattle, LP) - had sold its stake to the Mariners in January 2024
- Awesomeness – folded into Paramount Television Studios in 2025
  - Awesomeness Ink
  - Awesomeness Films
  - Awesomeness News
- Beme Inc. - merged into CNN Digital Studios in 2018
- BET+ - folded into Paramount+ in 2026
- Big Pixel Studios
- Blue Ribbon Content - closed in 2020
- Boomerang Germany - closed in 2018 and replaced by Boomerang CEE with German advertisements.
- Boomerang (Latin America) - closed in 2021 and replaced by Cartoonito (Latin America)
- Cartoon Network Amazone - closed in 2022 and replaced by Columbia Pictures Aquaverse
- Cartoon Network Hotel - closed on January 1, 2026 and replaced by Dutch Wonderland Inn
- Cartoon Network On-Air - Replaced by the Creative Group in 2010
- Cartoon Network (Spain) - Shut down in 2013 and replaced by the Spanish version of Boing
- Cartoon Network Too
- CBS Cable
- CBS Consumer Products – founded in 2009; folded into Nickelodeon & Viacom Consumer Products forming ViacomCBS Consumer Products (now Paramount Consumer Products)
- CBS Cable Networks – folded into Viacom Media Networks, later renamed ViacomCBS Domestic Media Networks (now Paramount Media Networks)
- CBS Connections
- CBS EcoMedia
- CBS Experiences Inc.
- CBS EYE Productions
- CBS Films – Dormant and absorbed into CBS Entertainment Group
- CBS Innertube
- CBS News Radio
- CBS Productions – folded into CBS Studios
- CBS Records
- CBS Satellite Communications
- CBS Technology Center
- CBS Sporting Club
- CBS Stages Canada
- CBS Theatrical Films
- CBS VFX
- CBS Vision
- Cinema Center Films
- Club MTV
  - Club MTV Australia
  - Club MTV EMEA
  - Club MTV UK
- CNN Airport
- CNN Checkout Channel
- CNNfn
- CNN Philippines (Nine Media Corporation and Radio Philippines Network) - closed on February 1, 2024 and replaced by RPTV
- CNN Pipeline
- CNN/SI
- CNN+ (in conjunction with CNN Worldwide) - second incarnation; shut down on April 28, 2022
- CNN+ (Spanish TV network) - first incarnation; joint venture with Sogecable
- CNN Money Switzerland - joint venture with MediaGo
- Comedy Central Records
- Cooking Channel (Canada) (19.8%) - shut down on December 31, 2024
- Crime Library
- DC Entertainment - folded into DC Comics in 2023
- DC Universe (SVOD) - shut down with catalog absorbed into HBO Max and spun off into DC Universe Infinite on January 21, 2021
- Dimension Films (pre-October 2005)
- Discovery Channel Multimedia
- Discovery Channel Radio
- Discovery Channel Romania
- Discovery Civilization
- Discovery Destinations Hotels & Resorts (joint venture with Scottford Enterprises)
- Discovery Family (France) - shut down in 2022
- Discovery Family Go - shut down on May 2, 2022
- Discovery Films
- Discovery Geschichte
- Discovery Health Channel
- Discovery Home & Health Southeast Asia
- Discovery Home & Health UK
- Discovery Kids Australia
- Discovery Kids UK
- Discovery People
- Discovery Real Time
- Discovery Real Time France
- Discovery Science CEEMEA - shut down on January 5, 2024
- Discovery Science France - shut down on February 26, 2024; replaced by TLC
- Discovery Shed
- Discovery Travel & Living
- Discovery Wings
- Discovery World Europe
- DKids
- DMAX MENA
- Dplay - replaced in available regions by Discovery+
- DTX - shut down on January 5, 2024
- DramaFever - shut down in 2018
- Ellen Digital Ventures (joint venture between Warner Bros. Digital Networks and Ellen DeGeneres)
  - A Very Good Production
    - eleveneleven – Defunct 2012.
- Discovery Program Sales
- Estudios TeleMéxico
- Eurosport UK - merged/absorbed into TNT Sports in 2025
  - Eurosport 360
  - Eurosport Norge
  - Esporte Interativo - TV channels shut down in 2018; brand replaced by TNT Sports in 2021
  - Eurosport 360°
  - Eurosport 2 Xtra (Portugal)
  - Eurosport News
  - Eurosport Player - replaced in available regions by Discovery+
  - Eurosport Plus
- Famous Studios (later Paramount Cartoon Studios) – closed after Gulf+Western's acquisition of Paramount Pictures in 1967
- FandangoNOW
- Fave TV
- FindArticles
- Fine Living Europe
- Fine Living Italy
- Fleischer Studios – acquired by Paramount Pictures and reorganized as Famous Studios in 1942
- Game One
  - Game One Music 3D
  - Game One Music HD
  - J-One
- King World Productions
  - Camelot Entertainment Sales
  - Eyemark Entertainment
    - Group W Productions
    - MaXam Entertainment
  - King World Direct Inc.
  - King World Merchandising, Inc.
- Hanna-Barbera - absorbed into Warner Bros. Animation
  - Hanna-Barbera Home Video
  - Hanna-Barbera Poland
- HBO Defined (India)
- HBO Family - Shut down on August 15, 2025
- HBO Now - replaced/dissolved by HBO Max
- HBO Downtown Productions — dissolved in 2001; pre-1992 library owned by HBO
- HBO Hits (India)
- HBO Independent Productions
- HBO Netherlands - joint venture with Ziggo
- HBO Go - replaced by HBO Max in the United States, Latin America, Nordics, Spain, Portugal, Central and Eastern Europe, was also active in Asian countries, until it folded and converted into simply Max which merging HBO Max and Discovery+ on November 19, 2024
  - HBO Nordic
  - HBO Portugal
  - HBO España
- HBO NYC Productions (formerly called HBO Showcase) - folded into HBO Films
- HBO Home Entertainment - transferred and folded into Warner Bros. Home Entertainment in 2019
- HBO Latin America Group - transferred and folded into Warner Bros. Discovery Latin America Group
- HBO Kids - discontinued on February 29, 2024
- Headstrong Pictures
- HOOQ (streaming service joint venture with Sony Pictures Entertainment and Singtel) - shut down on 30 April 2020 due to liquidation and eventually sold to Coupang in July 2020 to form the nucleus of its streaming service named Coupang Play
- I.Sat - closed on February 29, 2024
- In2TV - joint venture between AOL and Warner Bros. Television, integrated into AOL Video in December 2006
- Insurge Pictures
- iStreamPlanet - shuttered in 2023
- Legacy Releasing folded into Warner Home Video in 1999
- Liberty Films
- Lorimar Film Entertainment
  - Monogram Pictures/Allied Artists Pictures Corporation - sold to Lorimar in 1979; post-August 17, 1946 library currently owned by Warner Bros. Entertainment
    - Interstate Television - founded in the early 1950s as the TV arm of Allied Artists, became Allied Artists Television in the 1960s and was folded into Lorimar with the rest of AAPC in 1979
- Lorimar Home Video - folded into Warner Home Video in 1988
- Lorimar Records
- Lorimar Television
  - Rankin/Bass Productions - post-1974 library currently owned by Warner Bros.
  - ZIV International - acquired by Lorimar Productions in 1982; the library contents were sold to Coral Pictures in 1986.
- Machinima, Inc. - merged into Fullscreen in 2019
- Melange Pictures, LLC – library holder of Republic Pictures films
  - Budd Rogers Releasing Corporation
  - Commonwealth United Entertainment
    - The Landau-Unger Company
      - Astor Pictures
    - United Pictures Corporation
  - Enterprise Productions
  - Spelling Films
    - Taft International Pictures
      - Sunn Classic Pictures
- Momlogic
- Mondo Mah-jong TV - ceased broadcasting on March 31, 2022, due to the closure of the platform that carried the channel.
- Monolith Productions – closed in February 2025
- MotorTrend+ (subscription streaming service) - closing at the end of March 2024, with most of its subscribers and programming migrating to Discovery+ and Max
- MovieMax - Shut down on August 15, 2025
- MTV 80s
  - MTV 80s UK
- MTV 90s
  - MTV 90s UK
- MTV Animation
- MTV Base Africa
- MTV Base France
- MTV Base UK
- MTV Brazil
- MTV Greece
- MTV Live
- MTV Music
- MTV Base
- MTV Chi
- MTV Desi
- MTV K
- MTV News
- MuchMusic - closed on February 29, 2024
- National General Pictures - sold to Warner Bros. in 1973
- Nelson Entertainment - acquired by New Line Cinema in 1991; library currently owned by Amazon MGM Studios (via Orion Pictures)
  - Embassy Home Entertainment - former divisions of its sister company, Embassy Pictures
  - Galactic Films, Inc.
  - Spikings Corporation
  - Charter Entertainment
- New Line Home Entertainment - folded into Warner Home Video
- New Line Television - folded into Warner Bros. Television
- New Line Television Pay-Per-View - folded into Warner Bros. Television Distribution
- Nickelodeon Games Group – merged with Paramount Digital Entertainment to form Paramount Game Studios
- Nickelodeon Productions – folded into Paramount Television Studios
- Nick+ – shut down in 2022
- Noggin
- Oh!K
- Outright Distribution
- Otter Media - folded into WarnerMedia Entertainment on May 31, 2019
- OuterMax - Shut down on August 15, 2025
- Paramount Comics – partnership with Marvel Comics for comics based on Paramount's film library
- Paramount Digital Entertainment – merged with Nickelodeon Games Group to form Paramount Game Studios
- Paramount DVD
- Paramount High Definition
- Paramount Stations Group
- Paramount Famous Productions
- Paramount Television Studios - merged with Warner Bros. Television Group to form Warner Bros. Television Studios in 2026
- Paramount Television
  - Desilu Productions
  - Viacom Enterprises – assets currently owned by CBS Operations Investments, Inc.
    - Terrytoons
  - Viacom Productions
    - Viacom Pictures.
  - Wilshire Court Productions – made-for-TV movie division
- Paramount Vantage/Paramount Classics
- Paramount Worldwide Television Licensing & Distribution – folded into CBS Media Ventures and Paramount Global Content Distribution
- Quizilla
- Raquel Productions
- Scout.com
- Showtime/MTV Entertainment Studios – merged with Skydance Television to form Paramount Television Studios
- People's Court Raw
- Player First Games – closed in February 2025
- Prime Time Entertainment Network
- Quest Arabiya
- Quibi - Minority stake; shut down.
- Red by HBO (24/7 Asian cinema channel; joint venture with Mei Ah Entertainment) - ceased broadcasting on July 1, 2021
- Redknot - production company jointly owned by Discovery Kids Latin America and Nelvana
- Revision3
  - Rev3Games
  - What's the Big Deal?
- Screenlife Games
- Setanta Sports Asia
- Seven Arts Productions – merged with Warner Bros. in 1967
- Shed Productions - folded into Wall to Wall
- Showtime Studios – folded into Paramount Television Studios
- Skydance Games – divisions merged to form Paramount Games Studio
  - Skydance Interactive
  - Skydance New Media
- Skydance Media – library transferred to Paramount Pictures
- Skydance Television – merged with Showtime/MTV Entertainment Studios to form Paramount Television Studios
- Snowblind Studios - merged into Monolith Productions in 2012
- Spelling Television
  - Thomas-Spelling Productions
  - Laurel Entertainment
  - Worldvision Enterprises
    - ABC Films
    - Taft Entertainment Television
      - QM Productions
      - Schick Sunn Classic Productions
      - Titus Productions
    - Evergreen Programs, Inc.
    - Worldvision Home Video LLC
  - Charter Company
  - Republic Pictures (original)
    - National Telefilm Associates
      - Hollywood Television Service
        - Studio City TV Productions
      - NBC Films
        - California National Productions
      - U.M. & M. TV Corporation
  - Spelling Daytime Television
- Stage 13 - closed in 2022.
- Screwattack - Folded into Death Battle
- Studio T - combined Turner brand name for TBS Productions and TNT Productions; dissolved in 2019
- Super Deluxe
- Tabi Tele - ceased broadcasting on March 31, 2022, due to the closure of the platform that carried the channel.
- Take 2
- TBS (Latin America) - closed in 2023 and replaced by TNT Novelas
- TCM Movies
- ThreeLife
- ThrillerMax - Shut down on August 15, 2025
- Toonami (channels in India, Southeast Asia, and UK & Ireland)
- TNT Sweden - closed in 2019
- Toonami (UK and Ireland) - originally CNX until 2003; closed in 2007 and replaced by Cartoon Network Too (version 2)
- TruTV (Latin America) - closed in 2023 and replaced by Adult Swim (Latin America)
- Turner Broadcasting System - closed in 2019
  - Turner Broadcasting System Latin America
  - Turner International Argentina
- Turner Classic Movies 2
- Turner Classic Movies (Asia)
- Turner Classic Movies (Northern Europe)
- Turner Home Entertainment - folded into Warner Home Video as an in-name-only unit in December 1996
- Turner Japan - Japanese division which operations were absorbed into Discovery Japan on 1 August 2023
- Turner Pictures - folded into Warner Bros.
- Turner Program Services - folded into Warner Bros. Television Distribution
- Turner Studios
- UPN
- VH1 Classic Europe
- VH1 Europe
  - VH1 Denmark
  - VH1 Italia
  - VH1 India
  - VH1 Poland
- VHQ Indonezian
- VH1 Latinoamerica
  - VH1 Brazil
  - VH1 MegaHits
- VH1 UK
- VH1 Uno
- VH2
- Viacom Velocity
  - Nickelodeon Velocity
    - Nickelodeon Creative Advertising
- Viacom Digital Studios
- Warner Bros. Cartoons
- Warner Bros. Domestic Pay TV, Cable & Network Features - a former division of Warner Bros. Domestic Television Distribution that licensed Warner Bros. feature films, television series, miniseries, TV films, and specials to the pay television and basic cable markets, as well as feature films to the broadcast networks. Formed in 1994, it was re-organized in 2001 as “Warner Bros. Domestic Cable Distribution”, before folding into Warner Bros. Domestic Television Distribution in 2008
- Warner Bros. Family Entertainment - closed in 2011
- Warner Bros. Feature Animation
- Warner Bros. Global Kids, Young Adults and Classics - closed in 2022
- Warner Bros. Jungle Habitat
- Warner Bros. Studio Store
- Watch! Magazine
- WB Channel
- WB Games San Diego – closed in February 2025
- Watershed Television
- Warner Horizon Scripted Television - merged into Warner Bros. Television Studios in 2020
- WarnerMax - short-lived film production company joint venture by Warner Bros. and HBO Max, it closed down in October 2020
- Warner Independent Pictures - closed in 2008
- Warner Premiere - closed in 2013
  - Warner Premiere Digital
  - Raw Feed
- The WB - 64% joint venture with Tribune Broadcasting; closed in 2006.
- WhoSay
- World Championship Wrestling (WCW) - video library, selected wrestler contracts and other intellectual property sold to World Wrestling Federation Entertainment, Inc., now known as WWE (World Wrestling Entertainment), through its subsidiary W. Acquisition Company (which was subsequently renamed WCW Inc. following the sale) in 2001.
- Yalli Productions

==== Cable networks ====
- All News Channel (50% joint venture with Hubbard Broadcasting)
- Atom.com – absorbed into Comedy Central
  - AddictingClips.com
- BET France
- The Box
- CMT Films
- Comedy Central Brazil
- Comedy Central Films
- Comedy Central Now
- Comedy Central Productions – folded into MTV Entertainment Studios
- Defy Media (7%)
  - AddictingGames
  - Shockwave
- GoCityKids.com
- iFilm
- MTV Urge
- MTV SnowGlobe Music Festival
- Nickelodeon Games and Sports for Kids
- Nickelodeon Magazine
- Nickelodeon on Sunset
- Nickelodeon Studios (theme park & productions)
- Nickelodeon (Brazil)
- Nick Jr. (Brazil)
- NickMusic EMEA
- NickMusic Latin America
- NickMom – TV block on Nick Jr.
- Nick Radio
- Nickelodeon Records
- NickRewind – TV block on TeenNick
- Paramount Network Brazil
- Quizilla
- Viacom Music – music publisher affiliated with BMI
- Viacom NEXT
- World Sports Enterprises

==== International networks ====
- 5Spike – succeeded by Paramount Network in 2020
- Kindernet
- TMF
- Spree TV (50%)
- VIVA
- Voot – merged into JioCinema in 2023

==== Joint ventures ====
- Big CBS Prime (joint venture with Reliance Broadcast Network)
- Big CBS Love (joint venture with Reliance Broadcast Network)
- BIG CBS Spark (joint venture with Reliance Broadcast Network)
- CBS Action (joint venture with AMC Networks International)
- CBS Reality (with AMC Networks International)
- Film Cafe (Poland; with AMC Networks International)

== See also ==
- Lists of corporate assets
