= Arthur R. Taylor =

American television executive (1935–2015)

Arthur Robert Taylor (July 6, 1935 – December 3, 2015) was an American businessman.

Taylor was born in Elizabeth, New Jersey. He was a Phi Beta Kappa graduate of Brown University. He began his corporate career with the First Boston Corporation. He was later Vice President Finance and Executive Vice President of International Paper Company. He was president of CBS from 1972 until 1976. He then founded Arthur Taylor & Company, a private investment concern. In 1985, Fordham University named him dean of its Graduate School of Business Administration. Taylor also served as president of Muhlenberg College for a decade (1992–2002), during which Muhlenberg tripled its endowment, halved its debt, and saw a significant rise in admissions selectivity. Despite these institutional successes, Taylor's resignation in 2002 followed several meetings by the College Board of Trustees over his increasingly concerning behavior; this included an ongoing investigation by the Board that Taylor had been sexually harassing employees, supplemented by an anonymously authored document submitted to the Board detailing those actions and other inappropriate behaviors. At present, he is the college's only confirmed entry in the Academic Sexual Misconduct Database. He was a former member of the Steering Committee of the Bilderberg Group.

He was married to Kathryn Pelgrift Taylor. Arthur Taylor died on December 3, 2015, from pulmonary failure in Allentown, Pennsylvania.

Business positions
| Preceded by Charles Thomas Ireland Jr. | President of CBS, Inc. 1972–1976 | Succeeded by John D. Backe |
