= CBS Mobile =

Division of CBS Interactive Incorporated

CBS mobile logo

CBS Mobile was a division of CBS Interactive Inc. charged with building CBS Corporation's wireless business across entertainment, sports, and news for CBS, The CW, and CBS Paramount Television. CBS Mobile offered content ranging from mobile video alerts for CBS Mobile News, CBS Sports Mobile and entertainment properties, to mobile websites, made-for-mobile video on all major carriers, a 24/7 mobile television network, and partnerships with ad targeting companies.

== Features ==
=== Aggregate Knowledge ===
CBS Mobile partnered with the company Aggregate Knowledge, which sifts through click-histories of every story on the site and looks at users in aggregate in order to find patterns in those clicks so that it can recommend the most relevant web content based on what other people with similar tastes are reading and clicking on.

=== Ads ===
On February 6, 2008, CBS Mobile and Loopt announced an agreement to deliver the first location-based mobile website advertisements in the United States. Through this partnership, advertisers were able to use GPS and other localization technology to reach consumers at their physical location, enabling them to target users who are near a particular place of business.

==== Privacy ====
The ads are not sent via SMS to consumers' mobile devices, but instead appear on mobile websites which consumers can access from their phones. Loopt claimed that all consumer location data used is privacy protected in compliance with industry practices.

CBS Mobile and Loopt also require that interested customers “opt in” to the ad service. And to further protect privacy, the two executives say the ads are delivered anonymously and location history is not stored.

== See also ==
- Loopt
- CBS
