= Stanton Foundation =

Private American foundation

- Founded: January 2009
- Founder: Dr. Frank Stanton
- Type: Private Independent Foundation
- Tax ID no.: 13-3598005
- Purpose: Informed Citizen/First Amendment, Nuclear Security, Canine Welfare
- Location(s): New York, New York; Cambridge, MA
- Key people: Liz Allison Co-director; Andrew Weiss Co-director
- Endowment: $108,481,509 (2022)
- Website: thestantonfoundation.org
- Formerly called: Frank and Ruth Stanton Fund

The Stanton Foundation is a private foundation established by Frank Stanton, a long-time president of Columbia Broadcasting System ("CBS"). The Foundation focuses primarily on three areas in which Stanton was unable to complete his philanthropic plans within his lifetime: (1) supporting the First Amendment and creating a more informed citizenry, particularly in regard to civic issues, (2) supporting policy research in international security, with special emphasis on nuclear security and (3) advancing canine welfare. The Stanton Foundation is primarily a "no unsolicited proposals" foundation, although it operates several open application programs as detailed on its website.

== History ==
The Stanton Foundation is the creation of Frank Stanton, who served as president of CBS from 1946 through 1971, and, following his retirement from CBS, as chairman of the American Red Cross, chairman of the Harvard Kennedy School's Visiting Committee, trustee of the Center for Advanced Study in the Behavioral Sciences in Stanford, California, Harvard Overseer, trustee of the Museum of Broadcasting, and chairman of the RAND Corporation. He died in December 2006 at the age of 98.

Upon his death, he provided funding for the Stanton Foundation, a New York Foundation and successor to the previously unfunded Ruth and Frank Stanton Fund. The Stanton Foundation began grant-making activity in 2009. Its early grants included funding for the Stanton Nuclear Security Fellows and for strengthening Wikipedia's technology infrastructure.

== Activities/Mission ==
The Stanton Foundation's mission is to complete Frank Stanton's philanthropic agenda. The areas it funds are three: Informed Citizens/First Amendment, Nuclear Security, and Canine Welfare.

=== Informed Citizens/First Amendment ===
==== Informed Citizens ====
The Foundation's interests include classic and twenty-first century First Amendment issues and the larger challenge of the creation of a better informed citizenry.

Major grants in this area include two technology grants to the Wikimedia Foundation to improve Wikipedia's ease of use ($890,000) and the development of the Visual Editor ($3.6 million), and a $1.2 million grant to improve the quality of public policy articles. A grant of $1.39 million was made to the Wiki Education Foundation, a Wikipedia spinoff.

Numerous small grants are also made to innovative high school teachers in U.S. History and Civics.

==== First Amendment ====
Frank Stanton was generally praised for his "passionate and courageous commitment to a free press."

Major grants in this area include: a First Amendment professorship at Stanford Law School, the creation of First Amendment Fellowships at Electronic Frontier Foundation (EFF), the Reporters Committee for Freedom of the Press (RCFP), and, jointly with the Knight Foundation, at Yale Law School's Media freedom and Information Access Clinic.

=== Nuclear Security ===
Within the general area of international security, the Foundation has a very strong emphasis on nuclear security issues. It defines nuclear security as including nuclear terrorism, nuclear proliferation, nuclear weapons, nuclear force posture, and, as it relates to nuclear security, nuclear energy.

Major grants in this area include two nuclear security professorships at Stanford, and one at MIT in the Political Science department, currently held by Frank Gavin. It also funds postdoctoral Stanton Nuclear Security Fellows six major research centers, including the Carnegie Endowment, Council on Foreign Relations (CFR), Harvard, Massachusetts Institute of Technology, RAND, and Stanford.

=== Canine Welfare ===
The Foundation's support for canine health and welfare includes both research and traditional grant programs to promote the welfare of dogs and strengthen the human/dog bond. The Foundation is pragmatic in its orientation and strives to approach the question of, "What is good for the dog?" without preconception. This mission statement has led The Foundation to fund pioneering research in Veterinary Spectrum of Care with the goal of allowing animals across the country to receive reliable care at any price.The Foundation has several open application programs in this area.

Major grants and programs include the Center for Shelter Dogs at Cummings School of Veterinary Medicine, and a professorship in canine health and welfare at Ohio State College of Veterinary Medicine as well as the Frank Stanton Veterinary Spectrum of Care clinic. The Foundation also funds post doctoral research fellows at Duke's Center for Canine Cognition and other research and academic institutions, both in the US and abroad. Its open application programs include support for the establishment of K9 units in local police departments, the creation of dog parks in Massachusetts communities, and acquisition of mobile adoption vans.

== Controversies ==
In 2012, the Foundation provided funds for a paid Wikipedian in residence at the Belfer Center for Science and International Affairs. This became controversial due to links between the Belfer Center and the Stanton Foundation (the directors of each are married) and ongoing concerns about conflict-of-interest editing on Wikipedia.
