= Charles Thomas Ireland Jr. =

Charles Thomas Ireland Jr. (1921-1972) was a president of CBS, whose appointment from another company and then death caused turmoil within the corporation.

== Career ==
Educated at Bowdoin College and then Yale Law School, Ireland had worked at the ITT Corporation before he was appointed CBS president in 1971, making him third in power to Frank Stanton and William S. Paley. His appointment, which made him the likely successor to Stanton in the long run, caused turmoil at CBS since he came from outside the company and was placed ahead of several internal candidates. Shockingly, in 1972, Ireland died of a heart attack less than a year after his appointment and was succeeded by Arthur Taylor who held the job for another four years.

- Captain in the US Marines during World War II
- President of Alleghany Corporation
- Secretary of New York Central Railroad
- Vice president of ITT Corporation
- New England tennis champion
- Father to Claire (deceased), Ann, stepfather to Alan Ireland (Gardner) and Stephen Gardner

Business positions
Preceded by Frank Stanton	President of CBS, Inc. 1971-1972	Succeeded by Arthur Taylor
