= CBS Cable =

US cable television network (active 1981–1982)

- Country: United States

Programming
- Picture format: NTSC

Ownership
- Owner: CBS

History
- Launched: October 12, 1981
- Closed: December 17, 1982 (1 year, 66 days)

CBS Cable was an early but short-lived cable television network operated by CBS, Inc., dedicated to the lively arts (i.e. symphony, dance, theatre, opera, etc.). It debuted on October 12, 1981 and ceased operations on December 17, 1982.

== History ==
CBS Cable was a personal project of CBS founder William Paley, who hoped it would blaze a trail for cultural programming in the then-emerging cable television medium. Its program offerings were ambitious and often critically praised. Nevertheless, the network struggled, and ultimately failed, largely because of the reluctance of many cable systems across the United States to give it carriage, limiting severely its ability to attract both viewers and advertisers for its costly lineup of programming. Its program offerings, while critically hailed in their own right, frequently overlapped cultural, literary and historical programs broadcast over the air in prime time by PBS in nearly every television market. Further, cable systems in the early 1980s had far more limited channel capacity than they do today (usually the standard thirty-five channels in most cities). CBS Cable was competing for channel space by appealing to a select and relatively small upscale audience, while other networks coming on line at the same time such as MTV and ESPN promised larger and more broad-based viewership and therefore got cable operators to carry them far more easily. MTV and ESPN thrived and gave rise to additional companion channels within a short time, while the CBS Cable channel folded after just over 14 months in operation.

CBS made another effort to launch a cable network using the CBS name, CBS Eye On People, which launched in 1997, featuring mostly biography programming and programs from the CBS News archives, along with old episodes of 60 Minutes and other CBS newsmagazines. However the effort proved to be unsuccessful, and in 1998 CBS sold its stake in the network to Discovery Communications, which rebranded it as Discovery People before utilizing the channel slots acquired in the deal for their other networks.

== As a CBS division name ==
The CBS Cable name was used for three years as the name of the network's cable division, after the 1996 purchase of The Nashville Network (now the general-interest Paramount Network) and Country Music Television from Gaylord Entertainment, along with CBS' existing stakes in the regional sports networks Midwest Sports Channel in the Twin Cities/Milwaukee (now split into Bally Sports North, serving Minnesota and the Dakotas, and Bally Sports Wisconsin for Wisconsin, purchased in 1992 by CBS as part of their acquisition of Midwest Television, the owners of WCCO-TV and Green Bay's WFRV-TV) and the Home Team Sports network in the Baltimore/Washington market (now Monumental Sports Network). TNN and CMT were folded into MTV Networks after the 1999 merger with Viacom, with the sports networks sold to other parties shortly after the merger.

== Host ==
- Patrick Watson (also known for PBS' Live at Lincoln Center)

== Programs ==
- Artists and Mothers included the film A Film About My Home, an autobiographical piece by Oren Rudavsky, as well as pieces by Joseph Cornell, Martin Scorsese, Jonas Mekas and Mark Rance.
- Confessions of a Cornermaker, an original dance piece by Twyla Tharp.
- Count Basie Live at Carnegie Hall, one of Basie's final performances, featuring guests Tony Bennett, George Benson, Joe Williams and Sarah Vaughan.
- Gertrude Stein Gertrude Stein Gertrude Stein, starring Pat Carroll, a video recreation of her one-woman off-Broadway play of the same name from 1977.
- Gilbert & Sullivan productions by Brent Walker (H.M.S. Pinafore, The Pirates of Penzance, Iolanthe, The Mikado, and The Gondoliers) aired in its last week of broadcast.
- Kennedy's Children (1982), play by Robert Patrick, directed by Marshall W. Mason, produced by Glenn Dubose, Feb. 11 & 12, 1982, starring Shirley Knight, Jane Alexander, Lindsay Crouse, Brad Dourif, and personnel from the Caffe Cino.
- Mornings at Seven
- Music Music Music (1981), the history of music in 90 seconds, with a score arranged by Mel Tormé; designed and directed by John Canemaker.
- Nichols and Dimes: A documentary film about business investment, with Mike Nichols' very successful Arabian horse business portrayed as an example. This was the first show broadcast on the network.
- The Quiz Kids, a revival of the 1950s game show, hosted by Norman Lear.
- The Ring of the Fettuccines, parody opera co-authored by Marie Allyn King
- Signature, an interview series in which the camera never cut away from the interviewee.
- Singin'!, three specials produced by and featuring Nancy Dussault with Karen Morrow singing popular classics.
- The Song Writers, a series saluting composers of The Great American Songbook
- Tintypes, a revue of American music from 1895 to 1912.
- Mixed Bag, a selection of highlights from the channel's short history, shown as the network's final program.
