= Frank Stanton (executive) =

American broadcasting executive (1908–2006)

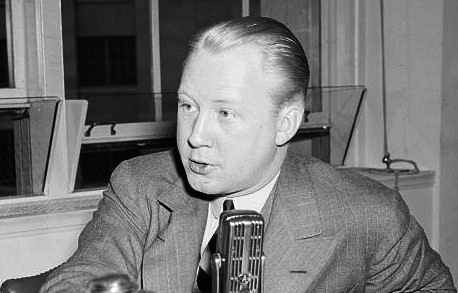
- Stanton in c. 1939
- Born: Frank Nicholas Stanton; March 20, 1908; Muskegon, Michigan, U.S.
- Died: December 24, 2006 (aged 98); Boston, Massachusetts, U.S.
- Occupation: President of CBS
- Spouse: Ruth Stephenson

Frank Nicholas Stanton (March 20, 1908 – December 24, 2006) was an American broadcasting executive who served as the president of CBS between 1946 and 1971 and then as vice chairman until 1973. He also served as the chairman of the Rand Corporation from 1961 until 1967.

== Early life ==
Stanton was born March 20, 1908, in Muskegon, Michigan, to Helen Josephine Schmidt and Frank Cooper Stanton. He attended Stivers School for the Arts (then called Stivers High School) in Dayton, Ohio. He then attended Ohio Wesleyan University in Delaware, Ohio, receiving a B.A. in 1930. He married his childhood sweetheart, Ruth Stephenson, in 1931. He taught for one year in the manual arts department of a high school in Dayton, then attended Ohio State University, where he received his Ph.D. in 1935. He also held a diploma from the American Board of Professional Psychology. His doctoral thesis was entitled A Critique of Present Methods and a New Plan for Studying Radio Listening Behavior; for his research, he invented a device that would make a reliable, automatic record of radio listening.

Soon after earning his Ph.D., Stanton became the third employee in the CBS research department. By 1942 he was a vice president of CBS and a fellow of the American Association of Applied Psychology, as well as a member of the American Psychological Association, the American Statistical Association, and the American Marketing Association; he was on the editorial board of the journal Sociometry. During World War II, he consulted for the Office of War Information, the Secretary of War, and the Department of the Navy, while serving as a vice president at CBS. He was selected as the administrator-designate of the Emergency Communications Agency, part of a secret group created by President Eisenhower in 1958 that would serve in the event of a national emergency that became known as the Eisenhower Ten.

== Career ==
=== Color television ===
Stanton helped lead the fight for color television. By 1950 CBS had been working on its field-sequential system of color TV for a decade. On October 11, 1950 the Federal Communications Commission (FCC) approved CBS's system as the first official color standard for commercial broadcasting in the U.S., although subsequent court challenges delayed actual commercial broadcasting until June 25, 1951.

On that day, Stanton appeared on an hour-long special, Premiere, with Robert Alda, Faye Emerson, Ed Sullivan, Arthur Godfrey, William S. Paley and others to introduce the CBS color system.

CBS color broadcasting only lasted for four months. CBS suspended it when the manufacture of color television receivers was halted by the US government as part of the Korean War effort. When the ban on color sets was rescinded in 1953, CBS announced that it had no plans to resume broadcasting using its field-sequential color system. A major problem with the CBS system was that the video was not "compatible" with existing black-and-white TV sets. A competing dot-sequential color system being developed by RCA was compatible, and in late 1953, the FCC switched its approval to an RCA-based system of broadcasting color TV.

=== 1950s controversies ===
During the period of McCarthyism, Stanton created an office at CBS to review the political leanings of employees. Although right-wing journalists considered CBS left-leaning, branding it "the Red Network," CBS maintained a questionnaire inquiring about journalists' political affiliations. At Stanton's direction, employees were required to take an oath of loyalty to the US government. Stanton and Paley "found it expedient to hire only those who were politically neutral" as they wished to avoid taking a position against the FCC and Congress or to jeopardize profit by taking "a stand against the vigilantes." According to radio historian Jim Cox, "CBS and the blacklisting became synonymous." CBS, in response to the culture of blacklisting, instituted a "purge of its own," as had Hollywood and President Truman. Paley was more responsible for policy setting, and Stanton was its main executor. Radio producer William N. Robson was one victim of the CBS purge; initially reassured by Stanton that his listing in the anticommunist Red Channels pamphlet would not mean the end of his career with CBS, Robson eventually found the executive office of CBS nonresponsive to his inquiries, and his earnings collapsed. Good Night, and Good Luck, a 2005 film portraying this era, avoids mentioning Stanton, partly because Stanton was still living and could have objected to his portrayal.

Stanton played a role in the infamous controversy involving Arthur Godfrey, CBS's top money-earner in the early 1950s. Godfrey insisted that the cast members of two of his three CBS shows, a group of singers known as the "Little Godfreys," refrain from hiring managers. When one singer, Julius La Rosa, hired a manager after a minor dispute with Godfrey, the star consulted with Stanton, who suggested that he fire the popular La Rosa, then a rising star, on the air, just as he had hired him on the air in 1951. Godfrey did so on October 19, 1953 without informing La Rosa before the airing. The move caused an enormous backlash against Godfrey. Stanton later told Godfrey biographer Arthur Singer, "Maybe (the recommendation) was a mistake."

=== Role in televising presidential debates ===
Stanton organized the first televised presidential debate in American history. After an eight-year effort, he convinced the U.S. Federal Communications Commission (FCC) to suspend Section 315 of the Communications Act of 1934 for the election in 1960, which stipulated the provision of equal air time to all candidates. Stanton thereby enabled the first two-candidate presidential television debate, which was held at and televised from the CBS studio in Chicago, with candidates John F. Kennedy and Richard Nixon.

The debates, however, ceased after the 1960 election, as Lyndon B. Johnson avoided debating in 1964, and Nixon, widely perceived to have made a poor impression on television viewers in 1960, declined to debate in 1968 and in 1972. Thus televised presidential debates did not resume until 1976, when incumbent president Gerald Ford, perceiving he was behind in the polls, agreed to debate challenger Jimmy Carter.

=== Quiz show scandals ===
While Edward R. Murrow's 1958 speech before the Radio-Television News Directors Association is often praised for its call for a deeper commitment among broadcasters to public service, Stanton in May 1959 (speaking before his graduate alma mater, Ohio State) also voiced his own commitment to public affairs. He promised that the following year, CBS would air a frequent prime-time public-affairs series, a series which later became CBS Reports. A few months later, in an October 1959 speech before the same RTNDA that Murrow had addressed in 1958, Stanton promised there would be no repeat of the program deceptions embodied by the quiz show scandals and cancelled all quiz shows at the time.

=== The Selling of the Pentagon ===
As president of CBS, Stanton's greatest battle with the government occurred in 1971, and focused on just this parallel to print press rights. The controversy surrounded "The Selling of the Pentagon," a CBS Reports documentary, which exposed the huge expenditure of public funds, partly illegal, to promote militarism. The confrontation raised the issue of whether television news programming deserved protection under the First Amendment.

The program came under intense criticism from two men who appeared on the program, from the House of Representatives, other media and some prominent politicians. Daniel Henkins, Undersecretary of Defense for Public Relations, charged that statements from his interview with Roger Mudd about his work had been doctored, as did Col. John MacNeil, who accused CBS of rearranging his comments in a speech he gave about the situation in Southeast Asia. The Investigations Subcommittee of the House Commerce Committee subpoenaed CBS's outtakes to determine whether or not distortion had taken place. Meanwhile, critics at the Washington Post and Time magazine, while not taking issue with the thesis of "Selling" that the Pentagon was engaging in propaganda, objected to the editing techniques employed in its production. The program was also criticized by Vice President Spiro Agnew and Secretary of Defense Melvin Laird.

Against threat of jail, Stanton refused the subpoena from the House Commerce Committee ordering him to provide copies of the outtakes and scripts from the documentary. He claimed that such materials are protected by the freedom of the press guaranteed by the First Amendment. Stanton observed that if such subpoena actions were allowed, there would be a "chilling effect" upon broadcast journalism.

For his efforts in that situation, Stanton was awarded one of three personal Peabody Awards (the others coming in 1959 and 1960). He also shared two other Peabodys that were awarded to CBS as a network.

== Retirement ==
Stanton was required to retire from CBS at 65 by a policy he had established. (The same policy would lead to Walter Cronkite's retirement from the CBS Evening News in 1981.) Although Stanton said he "wasn't about to break" his own policy, it is often speculated that he wanted to stay on longer but was prevented from doing so by Paley. The two men had a bitter relationship by the time of Stanton's retirement: Stanton resented being forced to retire and being denied the chairmanship of CBS, while Paley thought Stanton ungrateful for Paley's contribution to his career. Stanton continued his relationship with CBS, contractually receiving at least $100,000 per year for consulting until 1988, plus office space, secretarial support, and other expenses. In 1975 Stanton held about 355,000 shares in CBS, then worth more than $18 million. After CBS Stanton made numerous investments in start-ups and other companies.

=== Philanthropy ===
Stanton served for many years as a Red Cross volunteer, concentrating on public information and fundraising. After retiring from CBS, he was appointed Chairman of the American National Red Cross by President Richard Nixon in 1973, serving in that capacity until 1979.

From 1969 to 1970, while still president of CBS, Stanton served on the Metropolitan Museum of Art's 100th Anniversary Committee.

== Death and legacy ==
Stanton died in his sleep at his home in Boston on December 24, 2006, at the age of 98.

The Center for Communication in New York, founded by Stanton in 1980, presents a Frank Stanton Award annually to "individuals who exemplify achievement and excellence in any genre of mass communication". The Center's mission is to connect students of media to professionals in the industry. Stanton cofounded with Andrew Heiskell the Center for Public Policy in Telecommunication at the City University of New York.

The Frank Stanton Studios in Los Angeles house American Public Media's Marketplace Productions.

The Harvard School of Public Health established the Frank Stanton Directorship of the Center for Health Communication, with Dr. Jay Winsten as the incumbent.

The philanthropic Stanton Foundation was created upon his death.

In 2007, donations in undisclosed amounts were made on Stanton’s behalf to the Cooper Union college in New York City. The funds endowed the position of the college’s professor of design and contributed to the Cooper Union Building Fund.

On October 5, 2011 the Stanton Foundation awarded the Wikimedia Foundation $3.6 million, the foundation's largest-ever grant. The Frank Stanton Veterinary Spectrum of Care Clinic at the Ohio State University was named in his honor when it opened in spring 2021.

== Accolades ==
- 1957: Paul White Award, Radio Television Digital News Association
- 1971: Paul White Award, Radio Television Digital News Association
- 1984: Walter Cronkite Award for Excellence in Journalism.
- 1986: Television Hall of Fame
- 1990: National Radio Hall of Fame

Business positions
Preceded by unknown	President of CBS, Inc. 1946-1971	Succeeded by Charles Thomas Ireland Jr.
Preceded by	Vice Chairman, CBS, Inc. 1971–1973	Succeeded by
