= CBS =

American broadcast television and radio network

CBS Broadcasting Inc.
- Type: Television network
- Country: United States
- Broadcast area: United States, Bermuda, and Saint Vincent and the Grenadines, reaching bordering regions via overspill of their terrestrial networks
- Affiliates: List
- Headquarters: CBS Broadcast Center, Manhattan, New York City, United States

Programming
- Language: English
- Picture format: 1080i HDTV

Ownership
- Owner: Skydance
- Parent: CBS Entertainment Group
- Key people: George Cheeks (President and CEO, CBS Entertainment Group); Amy Reisenbach (President, CBS Entertainment); Bari Weiss (Editor-in-chief, CBS News); David Berson (President and CEO, CBS Sports)

History
- Founded: January 27, 1927; 99 years ago
- Launched: Radio: September 18, 1927 (as United Independent Broadcasters); Television: July 1, 1941; 85 years ago
- Founder: Arthur Judson; William S. Paley
- Closed: Radio: May 22, 2026; 5 months ago
- Former names: United Independent Broadcasters, Inc. (1927); Columbia Phonographic Broadcasting System (1927–28); Columbia Broadcasting System, Inc. (1928–74); CBS, Inc. (1974–97)

Links
- Website: cbs.com

Availability

Streaming media
- Affiliated Streaming Service(s): Paramount+ Pluto TV
- DirecTV Stream: Channel 390 (CBS HD East); Channel 391 (CBS HD West)
- Service(s): DirecTV Stream, FuboTV, Hulu + Live TV, Paramount+, YouTube TV

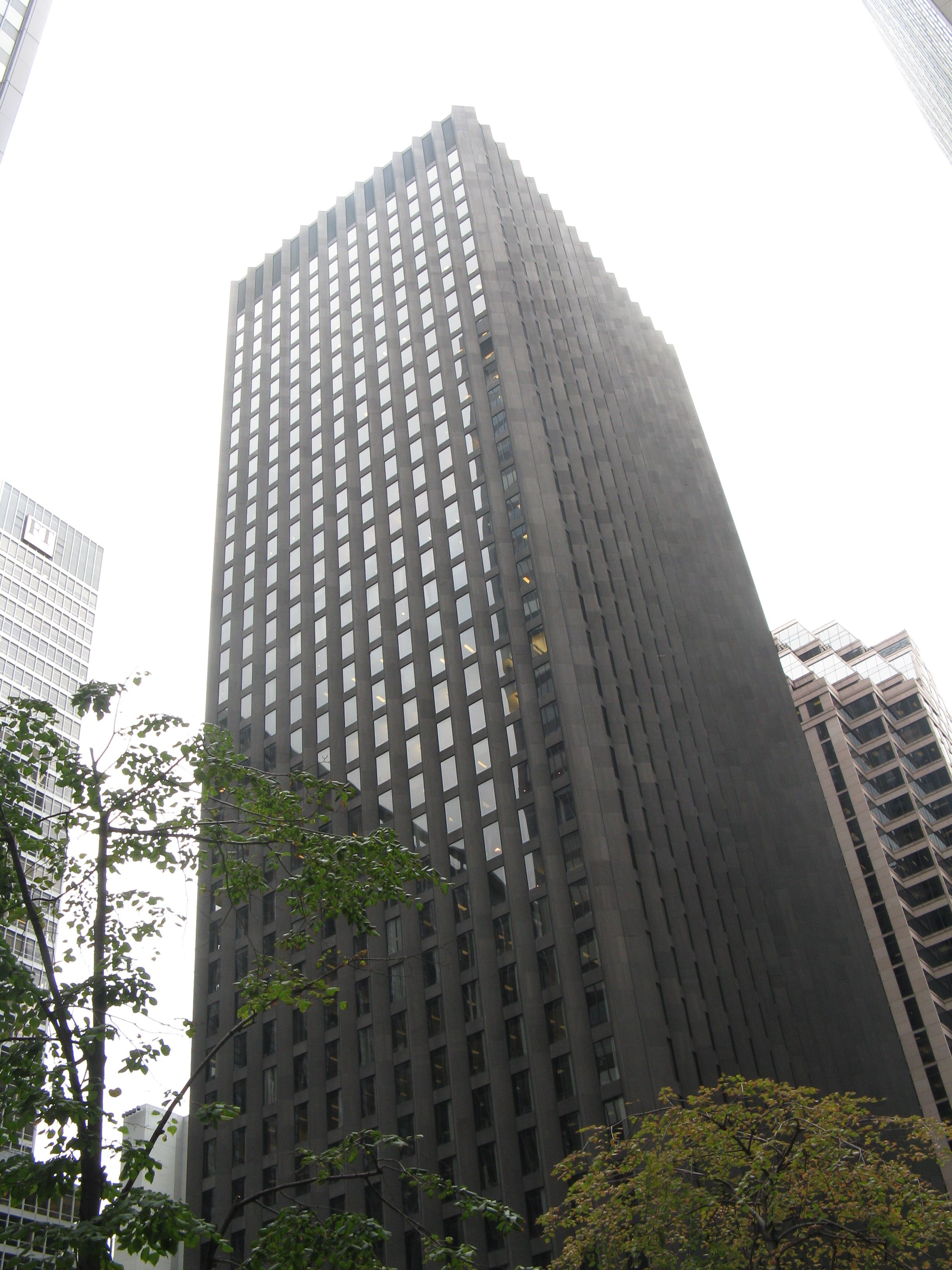
CBS Building

CBS Broadcasting Inc. (CBS, an abbreviation of its original name, the Columbia Broadcasting System) is an American commercial broadcast television network and the flagship property of the CBS Entertainment Group division of Skydance. It is one of Skydance's flagship subsidiaries.

Founded in 1927 as a radio network, headquartered at the CBS Building in New York City and being part of the "Big Three" television networks, CBS has major production facilities and operations at the CBS Broadcast Center and One Astor Plaza in New York City, and Television City and the CBS Studio Center in Los Angeles. It is sometimes referred to as the Eye Network, after the company's trademark symbol of an eye, which has been in use since October 20, 1951, and also the Tiffany Network, which alludes to the perceived high quality of its programming during the tenure of William S. Paley (and can also refer to some of CBS's first demonstrations of color television, which were held in the former Tiffany and Company Building in New York City in 1950).

== History ==
The network has its origins in United Independent Broadcasters, Inc., a radio network founded in Chicago by New York City talent agent Arthur Judson on January 27, 1927. In April of that year, the Columbia Phonograph Company, parent of Columbia Records' record label, invested in the network, resulting in its rebranding as the Columbia Phonographic Broadcasting System (CPBS). In early 1928, Judson and Columbia sold the network to Isaac and Leon Levy, two brothers who owned WCAU, the network's Philadelphia affiliate, as well as their partner Jerome Louchheim. They installed William S. Paley, an in-law of the Levys, as president of the network. With the Columbia record label out of ownership, Paley rebranded the network as the Columbia Broadcasting System.

By September 1928, Paley became the network's majority owner with 51 percent of the business. Paramount Pictures then acquired the other 49 percent of CBS in 1929, but the Great Depression eventually forced the studio to sell its shares back to the network in 1932. CBS would then remain primarily an independent company throughout the next 63 years. Under Paley's guidance, CBS would first become one of the largest radio networks in the United States and eventually one of the Big Three American broadcast television networks. CBS ventured and expanded its horizons through television starting in the 1940s, spinning off its broadcast syndication division Viacom to a separate company in 1971. In 1974, CBS dropped its original full name and became known simply as CBS, Inc.

The company was listed on the New York Stock Exchange under the ticker symbol "CBS". The Westinghouse Electric Corporation acquired the network in 1994, renaming its legal name to the current CBS Broadcasting Inc. two years later, and in 1997 adopted the name of the company it had acquired to become CBS Corporation. In 1999, CBS came under the control of the original incarnation of Viacom, which was formed as a spin-off of CBS in 1971. In 2005, Viacom split itself into two separate companies and re-established CBS Corporation through the spin-off of its broadcast television, radio and select cable television and non-broadcasting assets, with the CBS network at its core. CBS Corporation was controlled by Sumner Redstone through National Amusements, which also controlled the second incarnation of Viacom until December 4, 2019, when the two separated companies agreed to re-merge to become ViacomCBS (later Paramount Global, then Paramount Skydance, and now Skydance). Following the sale, CBS and its other broadcasting and entertainment assets were reorganized into a new division, CBS Entertainment Group.

CBS operated the CBS Radio network until 2017 when it sold its radio division to Entercom (now known as Audacy, Inc. since 2021). Before this, CBS Radio mainly provided news and feature content for its portfolio of owned-and-operated radio stations in large and mid-sized markets, as well as its affiliated radio stations in various other markets. While CBS Corporation common shareholders (i.e. not the multiple-voting shares held by National Amusements) were given a 72% stake in the combined Entercom, CBS no longer owns or operates any radio stations directly; however, it still provided radio news broadcasts to its radio affiliates and the new owners of its former radio stations until 2026, and licenses the rights to use CBS trademarks under a long-term contract. The television network has over 240 owned-and-operated (O&O) and affiliated television stations throughout the United States, some also available in Canada via pay-television providers or border areas over-the-air.

== Programming ==
As of 2026, CBS provides 87 1/2 hours of regularly scheduled network programming each week. The network provides 22 hours of primetime programming to affiliated stations Monday through Saturday from 8:00 p.m. to 11:00 p.m. and Sunday from 7:00 p.m. to 11:00 p.m. Eastern and Pacific time (7:00 p.m. to 10:00 p.m. Monday through Saturday and 6:00 p.m. to 10:00 p.m. on Sunday in Central/Mountain time).

The network also provides daytime programming from 11:00 a.m. to 4:00 p.m. Eastern and Pacific weekdays (subtract 1 hour for all other time zones), including a half-hour break for local news and features game shows The Price Is Right and Let's Make a Deal and soap operas The Young and the Restless, The Bold and the Beautiful, and Beyond the Gates.

CBS News programming includes CBS Mornings from 7:00 a.m. to 9:00 a.m. weekdays and CBS Saturday Morning in the same period on Saturdays; nightly editions of CBS Evening News; the Sunday political talk show Face the Nation; early morning news program CBS News Mornings; and the newsmagazines 60 Minutes, CBS News Sunday Morning, and 48 Hours. On weeknights, CBS aired the talk show The Late Show with Stephen Colbert and reruns of Comics Unleashed until May 21, 2026, and after that, reruns of Comics Unleashed and Funny You Should Ask aired in the 11:35 and 12:37 am ET/PT slots respectively.

CBS Sports programming is also provided most weekend afternoons. Due to the unpredictable length of sporting events, CBS occasionally delays scheduled primetime programs to allow the programs to air in their entirety, a practice most commonly seen with the NFL on CBS. In addition to rights to sports events from major sports organizations such as the NFL, PGA, and NCAA, CBS broadcasts the CBS Sports Spectacular, a sports anthology series that fills certain weekend afternoon time slots before (or in some cases, in place of) a major sporting event.

=== Daytime ===
CBS's daytime schedule is the longest among the major networks at 4 1/2 hours. It is the home of the long-running game show The Price Is Right, which began production in 1972 and is the longest continuously running daytime game show on network television. After being hosted by Bob Barker for 35 years, the show has been hosted since 2007 by actor and comedian Drew Carey. The network is also home to the current incarnation of Let's Make a Deal, hosted by singer and comedian Wayne Brady.

CBS is the only commercial broadcast network that continues to broadcast daytime game shows. Notable game shows that once aired as part of the network's daytime lineup include Match Game, Tattletales, The $10/25,000 Pyramid, Press Your Luck, Card Sharks, Family Feud, and Wheel of Fortune. Past game shows that have had both daytime and prime time runs on the network include Beat the Clock and To Tell the Truth. Two long-running primetime-only games were the panel shows What's My Line? and I've Got a Secret.

The network was also home to The Talk, a panel talk show similar in format to ABC's The View. It debuted in October 2010. The panel featured Sheryl Underwood, Amanda Kloots, Jerry O'Connell, Akbar Gbajabiamila, and Natalie Morales who served as moderator. The Talk officially ended its run on December 20, 2024.

CBS Daytime airs three daytime soap operas each weekday: the hour-long series The Young and the Restless, which debuted in 1973, and the half-hour series The Bold and the Beautiful, which debuted in 1987 and hour-long series Beyond the Gates which debuted in 2025. CBS has long aired the most soap operas out of the Big Three networks, carrying 3 1/2 hours of soaps on its daytime lineup from 1977 to 2009, and still retains the longest daily schedule. Other than Guiding Light, notable daytime soap operas that once aired on CBS include As the World Turns, Love of Life, Search for Tomorrow, The Secret Storm, The Edge of Night, and Capitol.

=== Children's programming ===
CBS broadcast the live-action series Captain Kangaroo on weekday mornings from 1955 to 1982, and on Saturdays until 1984. From 1971 to 1986, CBS News produced a series of one-minute segments titled In the News, which aired between other Saturday morning programs. Otherwise, CBS's children's programming has mostly focused on animated series such as reruns of Mighty Mouse, Looney Tunes, and Tom and Jerry cartoons, as well as Scooby-Doo, Fat Albert and the Cosby Kids, Jim Henson's Muppet Babies, Garfield and Friends, and Teenage Mutant Ninja Turtles. In 1997, CBS premiered Wheel 2000, a children's version of the syndicated game show Wheel of Fortune which aired simultaneously on the Game Show Network.

In September 1998, CBS began contracting the time out to other companies to provide programming and material for its Saturday morning schedule. The first of these outsourced blocks was the CBS Kidshow, which ran until 2000 and featured programming from Canadian studio Nelvana such as Anatole, Mythic Warriors, Rescue Heroes, and Flying Rhino Junior High.

After its agreement with Nelvana ended, the network then entered into a deal with Nickelodeon to air programming from its Nick Jr. block beginning in September 2000, under the banner Nick Jr. on CBS. By the time of the deal, Nickelodeon and CBS were corporate sisters through the latter's then parent company Viacom as a result of its 2000 merger with CBS Corporation. From 2002 to 2005, live-action and animated Nickelodeon series aimed at older children also aired as part of the block under the name Nick on CBS.

Following the Viacom-CBS split, the network decided to discontinue the Nickelodeon content deal. In March 2006, CBS entered into a three-year agreement with DIC Entertainment, which was acquired later that year by the Cookie Jar Group, to program the Saturday morning time slot as part of a deal that included distribution of select tape-delayed Formula One auto races. The KOL Secret Slumber Party on CBS replaced Nick Jr. on CBS that September, with the inaugural lineup featuring two new first-run live-action programs, one animated series that originally aired in syndication in 2005, and three shows produced before 2006. In mid-2007, KOL, the children's service of AOL, withdrew sponsorship from CBS's Saturday morning block, which was subsequently renamed KEWLopolis. Complementing CBS's 2007 lineup were Care Bears, Strawberry Shortcake, and Sushi Pack. On February 24, 2009, it was announced that CBS would renew its contract with Cookie Jar for another three seasons through 2012. On September 19, 2009, KEWLopolis was renamed Cookie Jar TV.

On July 24, 2013, CBS agreed with Litton Entertainment, which already programmed a syndicated Saturday morning block exclusive to ABC stations and later produced a block for CBS's sister network The CW that received its debut the following year, to launch a new Saturday morning block featuring live-action reality-based lifestyle, wildlife, and sports series. The Litton-produced CBS Dream Team block, aimed at teenagers 13 to 16 years old, began broadcasting on September 28, 2013, replacing Cookie Jar TV. The block was renamed CBS WKND in 2023.

=== Specials ===
==== Animated primetime holiday specials ====
CBS was the original broadcast network home of the animated primetime specials based on the Peanuts comic strip, beginning with A Charlie Brown Christmas in 1965. Over 30 Peanuts specials (many for a specific holiday such as Halloween) were broadcast on CBS until 2000 when the broadcast rights were acquired by ABC. CBS also aired several primetime animated specials based on the works of Dr. Seuss (Theodor Geisel), beginning with How the Grinch Stole Christmas in 1966, as well as several specials based on the Garfield comic strip during the 1980s (which led to Garfield getting his Saturday-morning cartoon on the network, Garfield and Friends, which ran from 1988 to 1995). Rudolph the Red-Nosed Reindeer, produced in stop motion by Rankin/Bass, has been another annual holiday staple of CBS; however, that special first aired on NBC in 1964. As of 2011, Rudolph and Frosty the Snowman was the only two pre-1990 animated specials remaining on CBS; the broadcast rights to the Charlie Brown specials are now held by Apple, The Grinch rights by NBC, and the rights to the Garfield specials by Boomerang.

All of these animated specials, from 1973 to 1990, began with a fondly remembered seven-second animated opening sequence, in which the words "A CBS Special Presentation" were displayed in colorful lettering (the ITC Avant Garde typeface, widely used in the 1970s, was used for the title logo). The word "SPECIAL", in all caps and repeated multiple times in multiple colors, slowly zoomed out from the frame in a spinning counterclockwise motion against a black background, and rapidly zoomed back into frame as a single word, in white, at the end; the sequence was accompanied by a jazzy though majestic up-tempo fanfare with dramatic horns and percussion (which was edited incidental music from the CBS crime drama Hawaii Five-O, titled "Call to Danger" on the Capitol Records soundtrack LP). This opening sequence appeared immediately before all CBS specials of the period (such as the Miss USA pageants and the annual presentation of the Kennedy Center Honors), in addition to animated specials.

==== Classical music specials ====
CBS was also responsible for airing the series of Young People's Concerts, conducted by Leonard Bernstein. Telecast every few months between 1958 and 1972, first in black-and-white and then in color beginning in 1966, these programs introduced millions of children to classical music through the eloquent commentaries of Bernstein. The specials were nominated for several Emmy Awards, including two wins in 1961 and later in 1966, and were among the first programs ever broadcast from the Lincoln Center for the Performing Arts.

Over the years, CBS has broadcast three different productions of Tchaikovsky's ballet The Nutcracker – two live telecasts of the George Balanchine New York City Ballet production in 1957 and 1958 respectively, a little-known German-American filmed production in 1965 (which was subsequently repeated three times and starred Edward Villella, Patricia McBride and Melissa Hayden), and beginning in 1977, the Mikhail Baryshnikov staging of the ballet, starring the Russian dancer along with Gelsey Kirkland – a version that would become a television classic, and remains so today (the broadcast of this production later moved to PBS).

In April 1986, CBS presented a slightly abbreviated version of Horowitz in Moscow, a live piano recital by pianist Vladimir Horowitz, which marked his return to Russia after over 60 years. The recital was televised as an episode of CBS News Sunday Morning (televised at 9:00 a.m. Eastern Time in the U.S., as the recital was performed simultaneously at 4:00 p.m. in Russia). It was so successful that CBS repeated it a mere two months later by popular demand, this time on videotape, rather than live. In later years, the program was shown as a standalone special on PBS; the current DVD of the telecast omits the commentary by Charles Kuralt but includes additional selections not heard on the CBS telecast.

In 1986, CBS telecast Carnegie Hall: The Grand Reopening in primetime, in what was then a rare move for a commercial broadcast network, since most primetime classical music specials were relegated to PBS and A&E by this time. The program was a concert commemorating the re-opening of Carnegie Hall after its complete renovation. A range of artists were featured, from classical conductor Leonard Bernstein to popular music singer Frank Sinatra.

==== Cinderella ====
To compete with NBC, which produced the televised version of the Mary Martin Broadway production of Peter Pan, CBS responded with a musical production of Cinderella, with music by Richard Rodgers and lyrics by Oscar Hammerstein II. Based upon the classic Charles Perrault fairy tale, it is the only Rodgers and Hammerstein musical to have been written for television. It was originally broadcast live in color on CBS on March 31, 1957, as a vehicle for Julie Andrews, who played the title role; that broadcast was seen by over 100 million people. It was subsequently remade by CBS in 1965, with Lesley Ann Warren, Stuart Damon, Ginger Rogers, and Walter Pidgeon among its stars; the remake also included the new song "Loneliness of Evening", which was originally composed in 1949 for South Pacific but was not performed in that musical. This version was rebroadcast several times on CBS into the early 1970s, and is occasionally broadcast on various cable networks to this day; both versions are available on DVD.

==== National Geographic ====
CBS was also the original broadcast home for the primetime specials produced by the National Geographic Society. The Geographic series in the U.S. started on CBS in 1964, before moving to ABC in 1973 (the specials subsequently moved to PBS – under the production of Pittsburgh member station WQED – in 1975 and NBC in 1995, before returning to PBS in 2000). The specials have featured stories on many scientific figures such as Louis Leakey, Jacques Cousteau, and Jane Goodall, that not only featured their work but helped make them internationally known and accessible to millions. A majority of the specials were narrated by various actors, notably Alexander Scourby during the CBS run. The success of the specials led in part to the creation of the National Geographic Channel, a cable channel launched in January 2001 as a joint venture between the National Geographic Society and Fox Cable Networks. The specials' distinctive theme music, by Elmer Bernstein, was also adopted by the National Geographic Channel.

==== Other notable specials ====
From 1949 to 2002, the Pillsbury Bake-Off, an annual national cooking contest, was broadcast on CBS as a special. Hosts for the broadcast included Arthur Godfrey, Art Linkletter, Bob Barker, Gary Collins, Willard Scott (although under contract with CBS's rival NBC), and Alex Trebek.

The Miss USA beauty pageant aired on CBS from 1963 to 2002, during a large portion of that period, the telecast was often emceed by the host of one of CBS's game shows including Bob Barker from 1967 to 1987 (at which point Barker, an animal rights activist who eventually convinced producers of The Price Is Right to cease offering fur coats as prizes on the program, quit in a dispute over their use), succeed by Alan Thicke in 1988, Dick Clark from 1989 to 1993, and Bob Goen from 1994 to 1996. The pageant's highest viewership was recorded in the early 1980s when it regularly topped the Nielsen ratings on the week of its broadcast. Viewership dropped sharply throughout the 1990s and 2000s, from an estimated viewership of 20 million to an average of 7 million from 2000 to 2001. In 2002, Donald Trump (owner of the Miss USA pageant's governing body, the Miss Universe Organization) brokered a new deal with NBC, giving it half-ownership of the Miss USA, Miss Universe and Miss Teen USA pageants and moving them to that network as part of an initial five-year contract, which began in 2003 and ended in 2015 after 12 years amid Trump's controversial remarks about Mexican immigrants during the launch of his 2016 campaign for the Republican presidential nomination.

On June 1, 1977, it was announced that Elvis Presley had signed a deal with CBS to appear in a new television special. Under the agreement, CBS would videotape Presley's concerts during the summer of 1977; the special was filmed during Presley's final tour at stops in Omaha, Nebraska (on June 19) and Rapid City, South Dakota (on June 21 of that year). CBS aired the special, Elvis in Concert, on October 3, 1977, nearly two months after Presley died in his Graceland mansion on August 16.

Since its inception in 1978, CBS has been the sole broadcaster of The Kennedy Center Honors, a two-hour performing arts tribute typically taped and edited in December for later broadcast during the holiday season.

== Stations ==
CBS has 15 owned-and-operated stations, and current and pending affiliation agreements with 228 additional television stations encompassing 50 states, the District of Columbia, two U.S. possessions (Guam and the U.S. Virgin Islands) and Bermuda and St. Vincent and the Grenadines. The network has a national reach of 95.96% of all households in the United States (or 299,861,665 Americans with at least one television set). Currently, New Jersey, New Hampshire and Delaware are the only U.S. states where CBS does not have a locally licensed affiliate (New Jersey is served by New York City O&O WCBS-TV and Philadelphia O&O KYW-TV; Delaware is served by KYW and Salisbury, Maryland, affiliate WBOC-TV; and New Hampshire is served by Boston O&O WBZ-TV and Burlington, Vermont, affiliate WCAX-TV).

CBS maintains affiliations with low-power stations (broadcasting either in analog or digital) in a few markets, such as Harrisonburg, Virginia (WSVF-CD), Palm Springs, California (KPSP-CD), and Parkersburg, West Virginia (WIYE-LD). In some markets, including both of those mentioned, these stations also maintain digital simulcasts on a subchannel of a co-owned/co-managed full-power television station. CBS also maintains a sizeable number of subchannel-only affiliations, the majority of which are with stations in cities located outside of the 50 largest Nielsen-designated markets; the largest CBS subchannel affiliate by market size is KOGG in Wailuku, Hawaii, which serves as a repeater of Honolulu affiliate KGMB (the sister station of KOGG parent KHNL).

Nexstar Media Group is the largest operator of CBS stations by numerical total, owning 49 CBS affiliates (counting satellites); Tegna Media is the largest operator of CBS stations in terms of overall market reach, owning 15 CBS-affiliated stations (including affiliates in the larger markets in Houston, Tampa and Washington, D.C.) that reach 8.9% of the country.

== Related services ==
=== Video-on-demand services ===
CBS provides video-on-demand access for delayed viewing of the network's programming through various means, including via its website at CBS.com; the network's apps for iOS, Android, and newer version Windows devices; a traditional VOD service called CBS on Demand available on most traditional cable and IPTV providers; and through content deals with Amazon Video (which holds exclusive streaming rights to the CBS drama series Extant and Under the Dome) and Netflix. Notably, however, CBS is the only major broadcast network that does not provide recent episodes of its programming on Hulu (sister network The CW does offer its programming on the streaming service, albeit on a one-week delay after becoming available on the network's website on Hulu's free service, with users of its subscription service being granted access to newer episodes of CW series eight hours after their initial broadcast), due to concerns over cannibalizing viewership of some of the network's most prominent programs; however, episode back catalogs of certain past and present CBS series are available on the service through an agreement with CBS Television Distribution.

Upon the release of the app in March 2013, CBS restricted streaming of the most recent episode of any of the network's programs on its streaming app for Apple iOS devices until eight days after their initial broadcast to encourage live or same-week (via both DVR and cable on demand) viewing; programming selections on the app were limited until the release of its Google Play and Windows 8 apps in October 2013, expanded the selections to include full episodes of all CBS series to which the network does not license the streaming rights to other services.

==== Paramount+ (formerly CBS All Access) ====
On October 28, 2014, CBS launched CBS All Access, an over-the-top subscription streaming service – priced at $5.99 per month ($9.99 with the no commercials option) – which allows users to view past and present episodes of CBS shows. Announced on October 16, 2014 (one day after HBO announced the launch of its over-the-top service HBO Now) as the first OTT offering by a USA broadcast television network, the service initially encompassed the network's existing streaming portal at CBS.com and its mobile app for smartphones and tablet computers; CBS All Access became available on Roku on April 7, 2015, and on Chromecast on May 14, 2015. In addition to providing full-length episodes of CBS programs, the service allows live programming streams of local CBS affiliates in 124 markets reaching 75% of the United States.

CBS All Access offered the most recent episodes of the network's shows the day after their original broadcast, as well as complete back catalogs of most of its current series and a wide selection of episodes of classic series from the CBS Television Distribution and ViacomCBS Domestic Media Networks program library to subscribers of the service. CBS All Access also carried behind-the-scenes features from CBS programs and special events.

Original programs aired on CBS All Access included Star Trek: Discovery, The Good Fight, and Big Brother: Over the Top.

In December 2018, the service was launched in Australia under the name 10 All Access, due to its affiliation with CBS-owned free-to-air broadcaster Network 10. Due to local programming rights, not all content is shared with its U.S. counterpart, whilst the Australian version also features numerous full seasons of local Network 10 shows, all commercial-free.

It was announced in September 2020 that the service would be rebranded as Paramount+ in early 2021, and would feature content from the wider ViacomCBS library following the re-merger between CBS and Viacom. The name was also extended to international markets and services such as 10 All Access. The rebrand to Paramount+ took place on March 4, 2021.

=== CBS HD ===
CBS's master feed is transmitted in 1080i high definition, the native resolution format for CBS Corporation's television properties. However, seven of its affiliates transmit the network's programming in 720p HD, while seven others carry the network feed in 480i standard definition either due to technical considerations for affiliates of other major networks that carry CBS programming on a digital subchannel or because a primary feed CBS affiliate has not yet upgraded their transmission equipment to allow content to be presented in HD. A small number of CBS stations and affiliates are also currently broadcasting at 1080p via an ATSC 3.0 multiplex station to simulcast a station's programming such as WNCN through WRDC in Durham, North Carolina, WTVF through WUXP-TV in Nashville, and KLAS-TV through KVCW in Las Vegas, Nevada.

CBS began its conversion to high definition with the launch of its simulcast feed CBS HD in September 1998, at the start of the 1998–99 season. That year, CBS aired the first NFL game broadcast in high-definition, with the telecast of the New York Jets–Buffalo Bills game on November 8. CBS gradually converted much of its existing programming from standard definition to high definition beginning with the 2000–01 season, with select shows among that season's slate of freshmen scripted series being broadcast in HD starting with their debuts. The Young and the Restless became the first daytime soap opera to broadcast in HD on June 27, 2001.

CBS's 14-year conversion to an entirely high-definition schedule ended in 2014, with Big Brother and Let's Make a Deal becoming the final two series to convert from 4:3 standard definition to HD (in contrast, NBC, Fox, and The CW were already airing their entire programming schedules – outside of Saturday mornings – in high definition by the 2010–11 season, while ABC was broadcasting its entire schedule in HD by the 2011–12 midseason). All of the network's programming has been presented in full HD since then (except for certain holiday specials produced before 2005 – such as the Rankin-Bass specials – which continue to be presented in 4:3 SD, although some have been remastered for HD broadcast).

On September 1, 2016, when ABC converted to a 16:9 widescreen presentation, CBS and The CW were the only remaining networks that framed their promotions and on-screen graphical elements for a 4:3 presentation, though with CBS Sports' de facto 16:9 conversion with Super Bowl 50 and their new graphical presentation designed for 16:9 framing, in practice, most CBS affiliates ask pay-TV providers to pass down a 16:9 widescreen presentation by default over their standard definition channels. This continued for CBS until September 24, 2018, when the network converted its on-screen graphical elements to a 16:9 widescreen presentation for all non-news and sports programs. Litton Entertainment continues to frame the graphical elements in their programs for Dream Team within a 4:3 frame due to them being positioned for future syndicated sales, though all of its programming has been in high definition.

== Branding ==
=== Logos ===
CBS Eye logo used since 1951

The CBS television network's initial logo, used from the 1940s to 1951, consisted of an oval spotlight which shone on the block letters "CBS". The present-day Eye device was conceived by William Golden, based on a Pennsylvania Dutch hex sign and a Shaker drawing. While the logo is commonly attributed to Golden, some design work may have been done by CBS staff designer Georg Olden, one of the first African-Americans to attract some attention in the postwar graphic design field. The Eye device made its broadcast debut on October 20, 1951. The following season, as Golden prepared a new "ident", CBS President Frank Stanton insisted on keeping the Eye device and using it as much as possible. Golden died unexpectedly in 1959, and was replaced by Lou Dorfsman, one of his top assistants, who would go on to oversee all print and on-air graphics for CBS for the next 30 years.

The CBS eye has since become a widely recognized symbol. While the wordmark has been changed, the Eye device itself has never been redesigned. As part of a then-new graphical identity created by Trollbäck + Company that was used by the network during the 2006–2007 network television season, the eye was placed in a "trademark" position on show titles, days of the week and descriptive words, an approach highly respecting the value of the design. The logo is alternatively known as the "Eyemark", a branding used for CBS's domestic television syndication division, under the Eyemark Entertainment name, in the mid-to-late 1990s after Westinghouse Electric bought CBS, but before the King World acquisition (which Eyemark was folded into), and subsequent merger with Viacom; Eyemark Entertainment was the result of the merger of MaXaM Entertainment (an independent television syndication firm which Westinghouse acquired shortly after its merger with CBS in 1996), Group W Productions (Westinghouse Broadcasting's own syndication division), & CBS Enterprises (CBS's syndication arm from the late 1960s to the early 1970s).

The eye logo has served as inspiration for the logos of Associated Television (ATV) in the United Kingdom, Canal 4 in El Salvador, Televisa in Mexico, France 3, Latina Televisión in Peru, Fuji Television in Japan, Rede Bandeirantes and TV Globo in Brazil, and Canal 10 in Uruguay.

In October 2011, the network celebrated the 60th anniversary of the introduction of the Eye logo, featuring special IDs of logo versions from previous CBS image campaigns being shown during the network's primetime lineup.

CBS historically used a specially-commissioned variant of Didot, a close relative to Bodoni, as its corporate font until 2021.

=== Image campaigns ===
==== 1980s ====
CBS has developed several notable image campaigns, and several of the network's most well-known slogans were introduced in the 1980s. The "Reach for the Stars" campaign used during the 1981–82 season features a space theme to capitalize on both CBS's stellar improvement in the ratings and the historic launch of the space shuttle Columbia. 1982's "Great Moments" juxtaposed scenes from classic CBS programs such as I Love Lucy with scenes from the network's then-current classics such as Dallas and M*A*S*H. From 1983 to 1986, CBS (by now firmly atop the ratings) featured a campaign based on the slogan "We've Got the Touch". Vocals for the campaign's jingle were contributed by Richie Havens (1983–84; one occasion in 1984–85) and Kenny Rogers (1985–86).

The 1986–87 season ushered in the "Share the Spirit of CBS" campaign, the network's first to completely use computer graphics and digital video effects. Unlike most network campaign promos, the full-length version of "Share the Spirit" not only showed a brief clip preview of each new fall series but also utilized CGI effects to map out the entire fall schedule by night. The success of that campaign led to the 1987–88 "CBS Spirit" (or "CBSPIRIT") campaign. Like its predecessor, most "CBSpirit" promos utilized a procession of clips from the network's programs. However, the new graphic motif was a swirling (or "swishing") blue line that was used to represent "the spirit". The full-length promo, like the previous year, had a special portion that identified new fall shows, but the mapped-out fall schedule shot was abandoned.

For the 1988–89 season, CBS unveiled a new image campaign officially known as "Television You Can Feel", but more commonly identified as "You Can Feel It On CBS". The goal was to convey a more sensual, new-age image through distinguished, advanced-looking computer graphics and soothing music, backgrounding images, and clips of emotionally powerful scenes and characters. However, it was this season in which CBS saw its ratings freefall, the deepest in the network's history. CBS ended the decade with "Get Ready for CBS", introduced with the 1989–90 season. The initial version was an ambitious campaign that attempted to elevate CBS out of last place (among the major networks); the motif centered around network stars interacting with each other in a remote studio set, getting ready for photo and television shoots, as well as for the new season on CBS. The high-energy promo song and the campaign's practices saw many customized variations by all of CBS's owned-and-operated stations and affiliates, which participated in the campaign per a network mandate. In addition, for the first time in history, CBS became the first broadcast network to partner with a national retailer (in this case, Kmart) to encourage viewership, with the "CBS/Kmart Get Ready Giveaway".

==== 1990s ====
For the 1990–91 season, the campaign featured a new jingle performed by the Temptations, which featured an altered version of their hit "Get Ready". The early 1990s featured less-than-memorable campaigns, with simplified taglines such as "This is CBS" (1992) and "You're on CBS" (1995). Eventually, the promotions department gained momentum again late in the decade with "Welcome Home to a CBS Night" (1996–1997), shortened to "Welcome Home" (1997–1999), and succeeded by the spin-off campaign "The Address is CBS" (1999–2000), whose history can be traced back to a CBS slogan from the radio era of the 1940s, "The Stars' Address is CBS". During the 1992 season for the end-of-show network identification sequence, a four-note sound mark was introduced, which was eventually adapted into the network's IDs and production company vanity cards following the closing credits of most of its programs during the "Welcome Home" era.

==== 2000s ====
Throughout the 2000s, CBS's rating resurgence was backed by the network's "It's All Here" campaign (which introduced updated versions of the 1992 sound mark used during certain promotions and production company vanity cards during the closing credits of programs); in 2005 campaign introduced the slogan "Everybody's Watching", the network's strategy led to the proclamation that it was "America's Most Watched Network". The network's 2006 campaign introduced the slogan "We Are CBS", with Don LaFontaine providing the voiceover for the IDs (as well as certain network promos) during this period. In 2009, the network introduced a campaign entitled "Only CBS", in which network promotions proclaim several unique qualities it has (the slogan was also used in program promotions following the announcement of the timeslot of a particular program). The "America's Most Watched Network" was re-introduced by CBS in 2011, used alongside the "Only CBS" slogan.

==== 2020s ====
In October 2020, CBS unveiled a new unified branding scheme to be implemented across the network and its divisions; the two main components of the rebranding are a "deconstructed eye" motif using the individual shapes of the eyemark (such as an animated ID), and a five-note sound trademark developed by the audio design agency Antfood, phonetically resembling the "This is CBS" slogan. Alongside the rebranding, CBS Television Studios was renamed CBS Studios, and CBS Television Distribution was renamed CBS Media Ventures. The network also dropped the "America's Most Watched Network" and "Only CBS" taglines, with chief marketing officer Michael Benson explaining that "it's tough to unify if you're bragging about yourself." Due to its programming being licensed to third-party streaming services, CBS programming began to carry a CBS Studios production logo based on the ID when applicable, and are billed with "CBS Original" or "CBS Presents" (specials) bylines in promotional material.

As part of the rebranding, CBS News and CBS Sports also introduced new logos and imaging incorporating the deconstructed eye motif, sonic branding, and corporate typeface, with CBS News initially using it for coverage of the 2020 presidential election, and CBS Sports launching its rebrand ahead of Super Bowl LV in 2021. In December 2022, CBS News and Stations began to deploy the branding on the local news operations of CBS's owned-and-operated stations, with most now being branded as "CBS News (region)" to align themselves with CBS News and its chain of local streaming news channels (with some exceptions in markets with heritage station brands, such as KPIX), and adopting new graphics and music incorporating the eye motif and sound mark (replacing Frank Gari's "Enforcer" music package, which was based on a theme historically used by WBBM-TV).

== International broadcasts ==
CBS programs are shown outside the United States: through various Paramount Skydance international networks and/or content agreements, and in two North American countries, through U.S.-based CBS stations. Sky News broadcasts the CBS Evening News on its channels serving the United Kingdom, Ireland, Australia, New Zealand, and Italy.

=== Canada ===
In Canada, CBS network programming is carried on cable, satellite, and IPTV providers through affiliates and owned-and-operated stations of the network that are located within proximity to the Canada–United States border (such as KIRO-TV in Seattle; KBJR-DT2 in Duluth, Minnesota: WWJ-TV in Detroit; WIVB-TV in Buffalo, New York; and WCAX-TV in Burlington, Vermont), some of which may also be receivable over-the-air in parts of southern Canada depending on the signal coverage of the station. Most programming is generally the same as it airs in the United States; however, some CBS programming on U.S.-based affiliates permitted for carriage by the Canadian Radio-television and Telecommunications Commission by Canadian cable and satellite providers are subject to simultaneous substitutions, a practice in which a pay television provider supplants an American station's signal with a feed from a Canadian station/network airing a particular program in the same time slot to protect domestic advertising revenue.

=== Bermuda ===
In Bermuda, CBS maintains an affiliation with Hamilton-based ZBM-TV, locally owned by Bermuda Broadcasting Company.

=== Mexico ===
CBS programming is available in Mexico through affiliates in markets located within proximity to the Mexico–United States border (such as KYMA-DT/Yuma, Arizona; KVTV/Laredo, Texas; KDBC-TV/El Paso, Texas; KVEO-DT2/Brownsville/Harlingen/McAllen, Texas; and KFMB-TV/San Diego), whose signals are readily receivable over-the-air in border areas of northern Mexico.

=== Central America, the Dominican Republic and the Caribbean ===
In Central America, the Dominican Republic and the Caribbean, many subscription providers carry either select U.S.-based CBS-affiliated stations or the main network feed from CBS O&Os WCBS-TV in New York City or WFOR-TV in Miami. In addition, network's programming has been available in the U.S. Virgin Islands since 2019 on WCVI-TV in Christiansted (owned by Lilly Broadcasting).

=== Guam ===
In the U.S. territory of Guam, the network is affiliated with low-power station KUAM-LP in Hagåtña. Entertainment and non-breaking news programming is shown day and date on a one-day broadcast delay, as Guam is located on the west side of the International Date Line (for example, NCIS, which airs on Tuesday nights, is carried on Wednesdays on KUAM-LP, and is advertised by the station as airing on the latter night in on-air promotions), with live programming and breaking news coverage airing as scheduled, meaning live sports coverage often airs early in the morning.

=== Puerto Rico ===
In the U.S. territory of Puerto Rico, CBS is carried through a special feed of Erie, Pennsylvania affiliate WSEE-TV, relayed via Mayagüez-based translator W22FA-D.

=== South America ===
In Ecuador, Peru, Argentina, Venezuela, Colombia and Brazil, many subscription providers carry either select U.S.-based CBS-affiliated stations or the main network feed from CBS O&Os WCBS-TV in New York City or WFOR-TV in Miami.

=== United Kingdom ===
On September 14, 2009, the international arm of CBS, CBS Studios International, reached a joint venture deal with Chellomedia to launch six CBS-branded channels in the United Kingdom – which would respectively replace Zone Romantica, Zone Thriller, Zone Horror, and Zone Reality, as well as timeshift services Zone Horror +1 and Zone Reality +1 – during the fourth quarter of that year. On October 1, 2009, it was announced that the first four channels, CBS Reality, CBS Reality +1, CBS Drama, and CBS Action (later CBS Justice), would launch on November 16 respectively replacing Zone Reality, Zone Reality +1, Zone Romantica and Zone Thriller. On April 5, 2010, Zone Horror and Zone Horror +1 were rebranded as Horror Channel and Horror Channel +1.

CBS News and BBC News have maintained a news-sharing agreement since 2017, replacing the BBC's longtime agreement with ABC News and CBS's with Sky News (which would have ended in any event in 2018 due to that entity's purchase by NBCUniversal).

As of the close of the Viacom merger on December 4, 2019, Channel 5 is now a sister operation to CBS, though no major changes to CBS's relationship with the BBC are expected shortly, as Channel 5 sub-contracts its news programming obligations to ITN.

=== Australia ===
Australian free-to-air broadcaster Network 10 has been owned by CBS Corporation since 2017 (subsequently, Paramount Global and currently, Paramount Skydance Corporation). Network 10's channels, 10, 10 Comedy, 10 Drama, and Nickelodeon, all carry CBS programming, with the latter drawing extensively from the wider Paramount Global library including MTV and Nickelodeon. Before the acquisition, CBS had long been a major supplier of international programs to the network. The cost of maintaining program supply agreements with CBS and 21st Century Fox was a major factor in the network's unprofitability during the mid-2010s. Network Ten entered voluntary administration in June 2017. CBS Corporation was the network's largest creditor. CBS Corporation chose to acquire the network, completing the transaction in November 2017.

=== Asia ===
==== Hong Kong ====
In Hong Kong, the CBS Evening News was initially broadcast live during the early morning hours on ATV World and replayed on International Business Channel from i-CABLE HOY; networks in that country maintain an agreement to rebroadcast portions of the program 12 hours after the initial broadcast to provide additional content in case their affiliates have insufficient news content to fill time during their local news programs.

==== Philippines ====
In the Philippines, CBS Evening News is broadcast on satellite network Q (a sister channel of GMA Network which is now GTV), while CBS This Morning is shown in that country on Lifestyle (now Metro Channel). Several CBS entertainment programs such as CSI, Late Show with David Letterman, and Survivor Series are broadcast by Studio 23 (now S+A) and Maxxx, which are both owned by ABS-CBN Corporation. 60 Minutes is currently broadcast on CNN Philippines as a part of their Stories block, which includes documentaries and is broadcast on Wednesday at 8:00 p.m. before CNN Philippines Nightly News with replays in a capacity as a stand-alone program on Saturdays at 8:00 a.m. & 5:00 pm and Sundays at 6:00 a.m, all in local time (UTC + 8).

==== India ====
In India, CBS maintained a brand licensing agreement with Reliance Broadcast Network Ltd. for three CBS-branded channels: Big CBS Prime, Big CBS Spark, and Big CBS Love. These channels were shut down in late November 2013. Following the CBS-Viacom remerger, the Hindi-language general entertainment channel Colors TV became a sister network to CBS through the Viacom18 joint venture with TV18.

==== Israel ====
In Israel, in 2012, the channels Zone Reality and Zone Romantica were rebranded as CBS Reality and CBS Drama, respectively. The channels were carried by Israeli television providers Yes and Hot, although as of 2018 they both only carry CBS Reality.

== Controversies ==
=== "Gay Power, Gay Politics" ===
On April 26, 1980, CBS aired "Gay Power, Gay Politics", an episode of the CBS Reports documentary series which purported to document the growing political significance of the LGBTQ community in San Francisco. The documentary was accused of purposeful misrepresentation and propagating misinformation, including in its coverage of the 1979 mayoral election. In spite of the documentary's premise, the episode focused largely on gay sexual practices and among other claims, alleged that 10% of deaths in San Francisco were related to BDSM. Journalist George Crile III also attempted to initiate an interview with then mayor Dianne Feinstein by asking her "how does it feel to be the mayor of Sodom and Gomorrah?" The documentary was aired at a time when the Christian right in the United States sought to use homophobic sentiment as a political tactic. Six months after the episode aired, the National News Council, in response to a complaint by journalist Randy Alfred, found that CBS had violated journalistic standards in airing the program.

=== Brown & Williamson interview ===
In 1995, CBS refused to air a 60 Minutes segment that featured an interview with a former president of research and development for Brown & Williamson, the U.S.'s third largest tobacco company. The controversy raised questions about the legal roles in decision-making and whether journalistic standards should be compromised despite legal pressures and threats. The decision nevertheless sent shockwaves throughout the television industry, the journalism community, and the country. This incident was the basis for the 1999 Michael Mann-directed drama film, The Insider.

=== Super Bowl XXXVIII halftime show controversy ===
In 2004, the Federal Communications Commission (FCC) imposed a record $550,000 fine, the largest fine ever for a violation of federal decency laws, against CBS for an incident during its broadcast of Super Bowl XXXVIII in which singer Janet Jackson's right breast (which was partially covered by a piece of nipple jewelry) was briefly and accidentally exposed by guest performer Justin Timberlake at the end of a duet performance of Timberlake's 2003 single "Rock Your Body" during the halftime show (produced by then sister cable network MTV). Following the incident, CBS apologized to its viewers and denied foreknowledge of the incident, which was televised live. The incident resulted in a period of increased regulation of broadcast television and radio outlets (including self-imposed content regulation by networks and syndicators), which raised concerns surrounding censorship and freedom of speech, and resulted in the FCC voting to increase its maximum fine for indecency violations from US$27,500 to US$325,000. In 2008, a Philadelphia federal court annulled the fine imposed on CBS, labeling it "arbitrary and capricious".

=== Killian documents controversy ===
On September 8, 2004, less than two months before the Presidential election in which he defeated Democratic candidate John Kerry, CBS aired a controversial episode of 60 Minutes Wednesday, which questioned then-President George W. Bush's service in the Air National Guard in 1972 and 1973. Following allegations of forgery, CBS News admitted that four of the documents used in the story had not been properly authenticated and admitted that their source, Bill Burkett, had admitted to having "deliberately misled" a CBS News producer who worked on the report, about the documents' origins out of a confidentiality promise to the actual source. The following January, CBS fired four people connected to the preparation of the segment. Former CBS news anchor Dan Rather filed a $70 million lawsuit against CBS and former corporate parent Viacom in September 2007, contending the story, and his termination (he resigned as CBS News chief anchor in 2005), were mishandled. Parts of the suit were dismissed in 2008; subsequently in 2010, the entire suit was dismissed and Rather's motion to appeal was denied.

=== Hopper controversy ===
In January 2013, CNET named Dish Network's "Hopper with Sling" digital video recorder as a nominee for the CES "Best in Show" award (which is decided by CNET on behalf of its organizers, the Consumer Electronics Association), and named it the winner in a vote by the site's staff. However, CBS division CBS Interactive disqualified the Hopper and vetoed the results as CBS was in active litigation with Dish Network over its AutoHop technology (which allows users to skip commercial advertisements during recorded programs). CNET announced that it would no longer review any product or service provided by companies that CBS Corporation was in litigation with. The "Best in Show" award was instead given to the Razer Edge tablet. On January 14, 2013, CNET editor-in-chief Lindsey Turrentine said in a statement that its staff was in an "impossible" situation due to the conflict of interest posed by the lawsuit, and promised to prevent a similar incident from occurring again. The conflict also prompted the resignation of CNET senior writer Greg Sandoval. As a result of the controversy, the CEA announced on January 31, 2013, that CNET will no longer decide the CES Best in Show award winner due to the interference of CBS (with the position being offered to other technology publications), and the "Best in Show" award was jointly awarded to both the Hopper with Sling and Razer Edge.

=== Harassment allegations ===
In July 2018, an article by Ronan Farrow in The New Yorker claimed that thirty "current and former CBS employees described harassment, gender discrimination, or retaliation" at CBS and six women accused Les Moonves of harassment and intimidation. Following these allegations, it was reported on September 6, 2018, that CBS board members were negotiating Les Moonves's departure from the company.

On September 9, 2018, The New Yorker reported that six additional women (in addition to the six original women reported in July) had raised accusations against Moonves, going back to the 1980s. Following this, Moonves resigned the same day as chief executive of CBS.

=== Second Trump administration ===
In 2025, some accused CBS of capitulating to the second Donald Trump administration, allegedly in part to gain federal government approval for the Skydance–Paramount merger.

In April, in response to a lawsuit filed by Trump, 60 Minutes editor Bill Owens resigned, saying "he no longer has control of the show."

On July 17, Stephen Colbert announced that his show, The Late Show with Stephen Colbert would be canceled effective May 2026 at the conclusion of his current contract, and that the entire Late Show franchise would be retired at that time. While CBS stated that the decision was "purely financial", many were skeptical, since the decision came shortly after Colbert had publicly called CBS's $16 million settlement to Trump "a big fat bribe", the pending Skydance merger was approved soon after by the FCC, and Trump publicly celebrated the show's cancellation. Other late night hosts spoke out in support of Colbert, with several appearing in cameo roles on the July 20 episode of The Late Show to offer their support.

On January 14, 2026, CBS reported that Jonathan Ross, the ICE agent who shot Renee Nicole Good in Minneapolis, suffered internal bleeding to the torso after the incident. A CBS staffer who was unauthorized to speak publicly said, "It was viewed as a thinly veiled, anonymous leak by [the Trump administration] to someone who'd carry it online." Forbes, The Guardian and Mediaite reported that there was "huge internal concern" at CBS News over running that news report.

==== Postponed CECOT story ====
On December 21, CBS postponed a 60 Minutes report on the CECOT prison in El Salvador three hours before it was due to air. A CBS News spokesperson said the segment "needed additional reporting." The New York Times reported that Sharyn Alfonsi, who reported the segment, wrote that the segment had been "screened five times and cleared by both CBS attorneys and Standards and Practices"; Alfonsi called the postponement a "political" decision.

==== Peter Attia resignation over involvement in Epstein files ====
In February 2026, Peter Attia, who joined as part of a new contributor group in January, resigned after U.S. Justice Department documents revealed past email exchanges with convicted sex offender Jeffrey Epstein.

== Presidents of CBS Entertainment ==
CBS Entertainment logo

Executive	Term
Arthur Judson	1927–1928
William S. Paley	1928–1946
Frank Stanton	1946–1971
Louis Cowan	1957–1959
James Thomas Aubrey	1959–1965
Michael Dann	1963–1970
Fred Silverman	1970–1975
Arthur R. Taylor	1972–1976
John Backe	1976–1980
B. Donald Grant	1980–1987
Kim LeMasters	1987–1990
Jeff Sagansky	1990–1994
Peter Tortorici	1994–1995
Leslie Moonves	1995–1998
Nancy Tellem	1998–2004
Nina Tassler	2004–2015
Glenn Geller	2015–2017
Kelly Kahl	2017–2022
Amy Reisenbach	2022–present

== See also ==
- CBS Cable, the company's early (and abortive) foray into cable broadcasting
- CBS Innertube
- CBS Kidshow
- CBS Mobile
- ExtraVision (teletext service broadcast by the network in the 1980s)
- History of CBS
- Lists of CBS television affiliates
- Meredith Corporation
- Westmoreland v. CBS
