= Discovery People =

- Country: United States

Programming
- Language: English
- Picture format: 480i (SDTV)

Ownership
- Owner: CBS Corporation (1997-1999); Discovery Communications (1999-2000)

History
- Launched: March 31, 1997; 29 years ago
- Closed: 2000
- Former names: CBS Eye on People (1997–1998); Eye on People (1998–1999)

Discovery People was an American cable television network.

The channel was launched on March 31, 1997 by CBS as CBS Eye on People, and featured news and human interest stories from CBS News.

The channel suffered significant losses, in part because few cable providers were willing to carry it. By the end of its first year on the air, it was only available in 11 million homes, less than half of what most cable channels need to turn a profit. In mid-1998, it was announced that Discovery Communications would buy 50 percent of the channel and take operational control. It dropped "CBS" from its title to become simply Eye on People.

On January 11, 1999, Discovery bought the network from CBS Corporation and renamed it Discovery People. Discovery continued to license programming from CBS, combining it with some of its own programming.

Discovery Communications began gradually phasing out Discovery People's operations, using Discovery People's distribution for other networks. For DirecTV customers, the channel was replaced by Discovery Health on December 1, 1999. In February 2000, Discovery announced that they intended to pull the plug on the channel.
