= Mobile news =

News for mobile devices

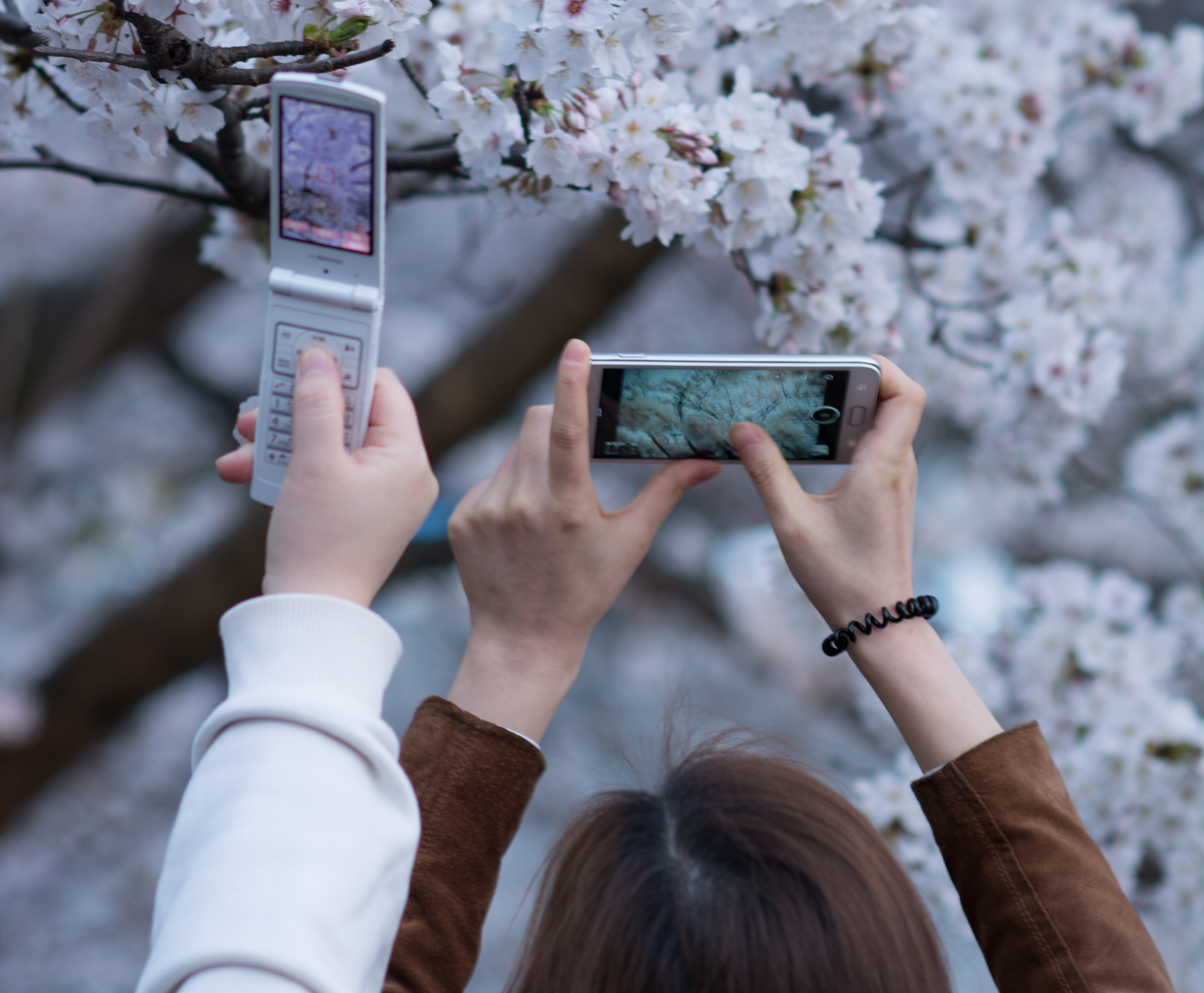
Viewing and/or gathering news on a mobile phone

Mobile news refers to both the delivery and creation of news using mobile devices.

== Mobile news delivery ==
Today, mobile news delivery can be done via SMS, by specialized applications, or using mobile versions of media websites. According to a recent market study across six countries (France, Germany, Italy, Spain, UK, and US), 16.9% of consumers access news and information via mobile devices, either via browser, downloaded application, or SMS alerts.

The demand for mobile news delivery is growing quickly, with 107 percent growth in daily access to mobile news in the last year alone. For example, the New York Times mobile site registered 19 million views in May 2008, compared to 500,000 in January 2007.

July 18, 2011, Time Warner announced that news coverage from CNN and Headline News will be streamed live over the Internet and available for people to view on their laptops, smartphones, or tablets if they subscribe to certain paid TV services.

From 2014 many media companies launched their native mobile application including Newsdash to engage global users by delivering quick and short news of their choice.

== Mobile news creation ==
Mobile news also has the potential to place the power of breaking news reporting in the hands of small communities and facilitate a much better exchange of information among users due to the ease of usage of mobile phones compared with conventional media such as radio, TV or newspapers, though issues of quality, journalistic standards and professionalism are of concern to some critics..

Mobile telephony and full featured mobile devices also facilitate activism and citizen journalism. In addition to individual efforts, major media outlets like CNN, Reuters, and Yahoo are attempting to harness the power of citizen journalists.

The creation of mobile news was fuelled first by the popularity of receiving text alerts, and then hugely accelerated when mobile companies embraced social media, making content creation easy and accessible.

== See also ==
- Citizen journalist
- Mobile journalism
- Ushahidi
