= Turner Japan =

Japanese television broadcasting company

Turner Japan K.K.
- Native name: ターナージャパン株式会社
- Romanized name: Tānā Japan Kabushiki-gaisha
- Formerly: Japan Entertainment Network (1997–2013)
- Type: Subsidiary
- Industry: Entertainment
- Founded: 8 May 1997; 29 years ago
- Founder: Time Warner; Itochu
- Defunct: 1 August 2023
- Fate: Rendered inactive; linear television channels absorbed to Discovery Japan
- Successor: Discovery Japan
- Headquarters: Japan
- Area served: Japan
- Key people: Kōki Takahashi (CEO); Tom Perry (CEO/General Manager)
- Parent: Warner Bros. Discovery Asia-Pacific

Turner Japan K.K. (Japanese: ターナージャパン株式会社, romanized: Tānā Japan Kabushiki-gaisha) was a Japanese commercial television broadcasting company operated as a part of Warner Bros. Discovery (WBD) through its International division. On 1 August 2023, its operations were absorbed into another WBD subsidiary, Discovery Japan.

== History ==
The company was originally established as Japan Entertainment Network K.K. (Japanese: 株式会社ジャパン・エンターテイメント・ネットワーク, romanized: Kabushiki-gaisha Japan Entāteimento Nettowāku) on 8 May 1997, as a joint venture between Itochu and Time Warner (later known as WarnerMedia). On 1 September 1997, the company launched the Japanese version of Cartoon Network on PerfecTV (a forerunner to what is now Sky PerfecTV Premium Service). The company officially renamed itself as Turner Japan K.K. on 1 April 2013.

In July 2009, the company acquired Japan Image Communications Co., Ltd. (JIC), which owned Mondo TV and Tabi Channel, from Secom, Fuji Xerox and Hikari Tsushin, Inc.. On 1 January 2014, JIC was merged into Turner Japan.

On 30 January 2018, Turner Japan launched three new channels, Boomerang (a spin off channel to Cartoon Network), Tabi Tele (a spin off to Tabi Channel) and Mondo Mah-jong TV (a spin off to Mondo TV), on NTT Docomo's DTV Channel OTT multichannel television platform. The channels were closed down on 31 March 2022 with DTV Channel's termination of service.

Following the April 2022 merger between WarnerMedia and Discovery, Inc. that led to the formation of Warner Bros. Discovery (WBD), Turner Japan's linear television channels were absorbed into Discovery Japan (a joint venture between WBD and J:COM) on 1 August 2023, rendering its status as an inactive company.

== Final operations ==
- Cartoon Network
- Mondo TV
- Tabi Channel

=== Channels on DTV Channel ===
- Boomerang
- Mondo Mah-jong TV
- Tabi Tele
