= Viacom NEXT =

American media conglomerate

- Founded: 2015; 10 years ago
- Defunct: February 2018
- Products: Augmented reality/ Virtual reality
- Parent: Viacom

Viacom NEXT was Viacom's production studio focused on building immersive experiences, interactive music videos, narrative worlds, and video games. Based in New York, the studio employed developers and specialists with expertise in 3D modeling and animation, storytelling, and experience design.

Founded in 2015, they first collaborated with the New York City Media Lab (NYCML) on a VR fellowship exploring storytelling mechanisms afforded by virtual reality.

In 2016, Viacom NEXT released their first brand project, "Open Your Eyes,” a free virtual reality art show for MTV's Elect This campaign. The project was met with great reception.

Some of the artists, brands, creators, and universities Viacom NEXT has collaborated with include Billy Corgan, Cabbibo, Daniel Bittman, Hot Sugar, Isobar, Massachusetts Institute of Technology, Max Frost, MTV, Paramount Home Media, and Tyler Hurd.

Viacom NEXT was dissolved in February 2018 after a company-wide restructuring.

== Awards ==
The company's Virtual Reality music video "Chocolate" was selected to premiere in the New Frontier showcase at the 2017 Sundance Film Festival in Park City, Utah and recognized by The Verge as a Best Interactive Virtual Reality runner-up.

Their final project, Aeronaut VR, won the Cannes Lions Grand Prix for Digital Craft in 2018.

== Projects ==
Title	Year	Collaborators	Type
Transformers: Cade's Junkyard	2017	Paramount Home Media Distribution	AR
Aeronaut	2017	Billy Corgan, Isobar	VR
ARQUA!	2017	Cabbibo	AR
VMA Facebook Camera Effects	2017	MTV	AR
Chocolate	2017	Tyler Hurd	VR
The Melody of Dust	2017	Hot Sugar	VR
Withdrawal	2017	Max Frost	VR
Smash Party	2016	Titmouse	VR
Open Your Eyes	2016	MTV	VR
