= John Backe =

American television executive

John David Backe (July 5, 1932 – October 22, 2015) was an American television executive who served as the President and CEO of CBS from 1977 until 1980. Previously a bomber pilot, Backe helped CBS return to number 1 in the late 1970s before being ousted by CBS' founder, William S. Paley. He died on October 22, 2015, from heart failure. He was 83.
