= Big CBS Love =

Indian TV channel

- Country: India
- Headquarters: Mumbai, Maharashtra

Ownership
- Owner: Joint Venture between Reliance Broadcast Network Limited and CBS Studios International
- Sister channels: Big CBS Prime; Big CBS Spark

History
- Launched: 21 March 2011
- Closed: 26 November 2013

Links
- Website: Official Website

Big CBS Love was an Indian English-language television channel established as a joint venture between Reliance Broadcast Network and CBS Studios International in March 2011 to focus on young urban viewers. It was closed in late November 2013.

== Programming ==
- America's Got Talent
- Australia's Next Top Model
- Canada's Next Top Model
- Dexter
- Elite Model Look
- Everybody Loves Raymond
- Excused
- I Love Style
- ILS Special Weekend
- Love Flicks
- New Zealand's Next Top Model
- Ringer
- Rules of Engagement
- Sex and the City
- Shedding for the Wedding
- Under the Dome

== See also ==
- Big CBS Spark
- Big CBS Prime
