= BIG CBS Spark =

Big CBS Spark
- Country: India
- Headquarters: Mumbai, Maharashtra

Ownership
- Owner: Joint venture between Reliance Broadcast Network Limited and CBS Studios International
- Sister channels: Big CBS Prime; Big CBS Love

History
- Launched: 2010
- Closed: 2013

Links
- Website: Official website

Big CBS Spark was a youth entertainment channel which was a joint venture between Reliance Broadcast Network and CBS Studios International. It was shut down from June 2013.

In January 2014, CBS Studios International and Reliance Broadcast Network Ltd. ended their three-year joint venture. The joint venture was carrying three television channels for broadcast in India including Big CBS Prime, Big CBS Love and youth channel Big CBS Spark. Along with this dissolution between the two companies, Reliance started discontinuing CBS Spark from major cable operators in India including Reliance Digital TV, Den Networks, Airtel Digital TV, Dish TV, Videocon D2H and Hathway.

== Shows broadcast ==
- Spark Hitz
- Warbirds
- Hot Hitz
- The Jerry Springer Show
- Livewire
- America's Got Talent
- Spark's B Crunk'd
- Mojai Moja
- 90210
- Weekend Special
- Spark Hitz Vdos
- Ggits
- Ultimate Top 50
- Cheaters
