= Big CBS Prime =

Indian TV channel

- Big CBS Prime
- Country: India
- Headquarters: Mumbai, Maharashtra

Ownership
- Owner: Joint Venture between Reliance Broadcast Network Limited and Paramount International Networks
- Sister channels: Big CBS Spark; Big CBS Love

History
- Launched: November 29, 2010; 15 years ago
- Closed: November 2013; 12 years ago

Links
- Website: Official Website

Big CBS Prime was an Indian English-language television channel established as a joint venture between Reliance Broadcast Network Limited and CBS Studios International (now Paramount International Networks).

The channel went on air and began telecasting from 29 November 2010 along with sister channels Big CBS Spark, which was aimed at youth and Big CBS Love, aimed at women.

== Availability and distribution ==
Big CBS Prime was distributed through DTH platforms such as Big TV, Videocon d2h and Airtel Digital TV, and on cable network via Digicable, Den Networks, Hathway, InCable and 7Star.

== Shows broadcast on Big CBS Prime ==
- Dexter
- Galileo Extreme
- Bullets, Blood & a Fistful of Ca$h
- America's Got Talent
- Big Wheels
- The Jerry Springer Show
- Survivor
- Aspire
- Blue Bloods
- 13: Fear Is Real
- CSI: New York
- Hawaii Five-0

== See also ==
- Big CBS Spark
- Big CBS Love
