= Animax =

Japanese anime satellite television network

- Logo used since 2006
- Country: Japan
- Broadcast area: Nationwide
- Headquarters: Ebisu, Shibuya, Tokyo

Programming
- Language: Japanese
- Picture format: 1080i (HDTV)

Ownership
- Owner: AK Entertainment (Nojima Corporation)
- Key people: Masao Takiyama, President; Ryoji Nojima, Executive Vice President

History
- Founded: July 1, 1998; 28 years ago

Links
- Website: www.animax.co.jp

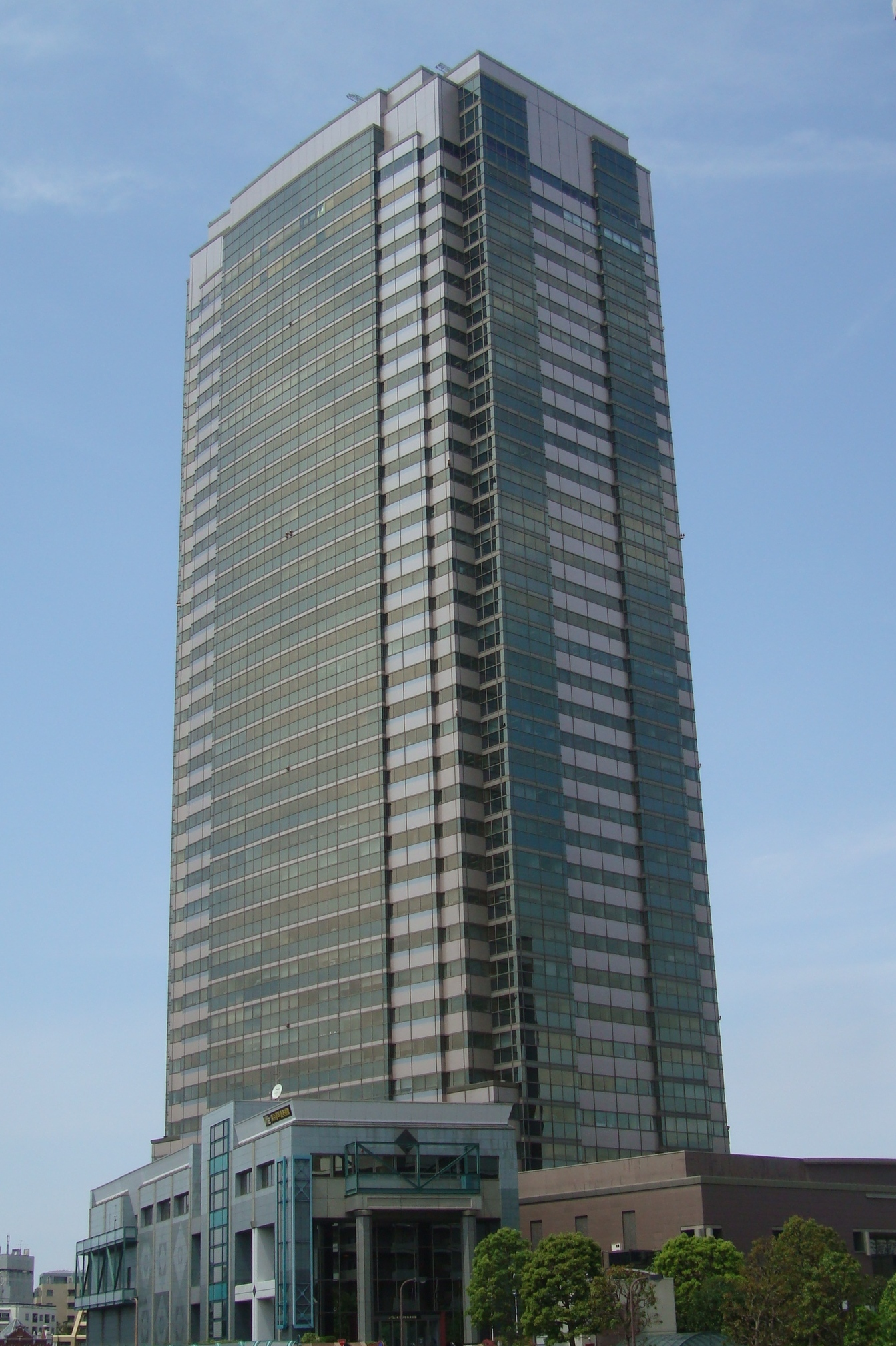
Headquarters in Ebisu, Shibuya, Tokyo.

Animax (Japanese: アニマックス, Hepburn: Animakkusu), stylized as ANIMAX in all caps, is a Japanese animation satellite television network, dedicated to broadcasting anime programming. Launched on July 1, 1998, Animax is the first 24-hour network in the world dedicated to anime.

Animax is part of AK Entertainment, owned by Nojima, and is headquartered in New Pier Takeshiba North Tower in Minato, Tokyo, Japan. The channel was originally co-founded by Sony Pictures Entertainment Japan, with its shareholders including studios Sunrise, Toei Animation, TMS Entertainment (previously known as Kyokuichi), and production company Nihon Ad Systems.

Animax previously operated separate TV channels for Asia (four separate feeds for South East Asia, the Philippines, Hong Kong and Taiwan), South Asia and South Korea; in addition to either owning, or licensing its brand to, several television networks, programming blocks, and VOD platforms around the world. As of 2020, most of these services have either been sold off to third-parties or closed altogether.

== History ==
=== Under Sony ===
Animax's original logo, used from its formation until 2006

Animax's second logo, solidly used from 2006 to 2010, and 2013 to 2016 (except Japan).

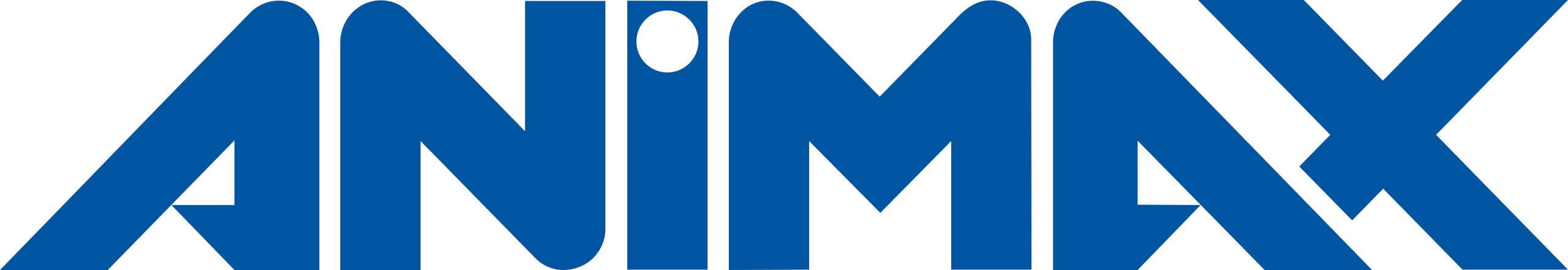
Animax's third logo, used from 2010 to 2016 in the European countries.

Established on May 20, 1998, by Sony, Animax Broadcast Japan Inc. (株式会社アニマックスブロードキャスト・ジャパン(Hiragana), Kabushiki-gaisha Animakkusu Burōdokyasuto Japan) launched in Japan on July 1, the same year, across the SKY PerfecTV! satellite television platform. Headquartered in Minato, Tokyo, Japan, and presided by Masao Takiyama, Animax's shareholders and founders included Sony Pictures Entertainment Japan, Sunrise, Toei Animation, Kyokuichi (later known as TMS Entertainment), and NAS. Its founders also include noted anime producer and production designer Yoshirō Kataoka. The network began broadcasting in high definition from October 2009.

Animax also exhibits affiliations with anime pioneer Osamu Tezuka's Tezuka Productions company, Pierrot, Nippon Animation, and numerous others. Other noted Japanese celebrities and personalities to have appeared on Animax with their own programs include actress Natsuki Katō, who appeared on Hungry Heart: Wild Striker and Pokémon Zoroark: Master of Illusions. The network's narrators are the voice actors Yukari Tamura and Kōsuke Okano; and from October 2007, Sayuri Yahagi.

Beyond the channel, Animax has hosted and organized several anime-based competitions across Japan, such as the Animax Taishō scriptwriting competition and the Animax Anison Grand Prix; an anime song music competition judged by a panel of noted anime figures

Several other Animax-branded events and concerts across Japan have included the annual Animax Summer Fest (アニマックスサマーフェス, Animakkusu Samāfesu), a live concert during which renowned Japanese bands, artists and voice actors perform, and is often held at Zepp Tokyo. They've also held another annual Anime song concert event called Animax Musix.

Animax previously operated a mobile television service, which was announced in February 2007, and launched through the mobile phone company MOBAHO! from April 2007.

=== Sale to Nojima ===
On December 18, 2023, Sony Pictures Entertainment Japan announced that will sell their stakes in both Animax and sister channel Kids Station to electronic store chain Nojima. The deal was finalized on April 1, 2024.

Sony would first establish a new company called "AK Media", which would take over all shares in Animax and Kids Station from their previous owners. Nojima's AK Entertainment subsidiary (Note: Established on October 24, 2023 to house the AXN Japan and AXN Mystery channels, now respectively known as Action Channel and Mystery Channel, which were acquired from Sony Pictures Entertainment by Nojima in 2021) would then acquire AK Media from Sony. It's been speculated that Animax was sold in-order for Sony to focus on its US-based, global, anime entertainment and streaming companies – Funimation (which was acquired in 2017) and Crunchyroll (which was acquired in 2021) – which have since been merged into Crunchyroll LLC and operate as a joint venture with Sony Music Entertainment Japan's Aniplex.

In May 2024, AK Media would be absorbed into AK Entertainment.

== Programming ==
Animax's programming is dedicated to anime and has been acknowledged as the largest 24-hour anime-only network in the world. The channel's programming has ranged from television series, films, to original video animations. It has also aired imported foreign cartoons that have been dubbed into Japanese. Its viewer reach has been quoted as spanning over 89 million homes across 62 countries and 17 languages.

The channel has co-produced and exclusively premiered several original anime series, including Ghost in the Shell: Stand Alone Complex and Marvel Anime.

== International ==
| Channel | Country or region | Formerly | Launch year | Replaced by | Shutdown year |
Current
| Animax (Asian TV channel); Owned by KC Global Media Entertainment | Asia | | January 1, 2004 | | January 1, 2022 (Malaysia); January 1, 2025 (Vietnam) |
| Animax (South Korean TV channel); Owned by JJ MediaWorks | South Korea | | April 29, 2006 | | |
Former
| Animax India | India | | July 5, 2004 | Sony YAY! Animax Asia | April 18, 2017 |
| Animax (Latin America) | Latin America | Locomotion | July 31, 2005 | Sony Spin | May 1, 2011 |
| Animax (Germany) | Germany | | May 14, 2007 | discontinued | July 7, 2016 |
| Animax (Eastern European TV channel) | Hungary | A+ Anime | July 2, 2007 | C8 | March 31, 2014 |
| Animax (Eastern European TV channel) | Romania | A+ Anime | July 2, 2007 | C8 | March 31, 2014 |
| Animax (Eastern European TV channel) | Czech Republic | A+ Anime | July 2, 2007 | C8 | March 31, 2014 |
| Animax (Eastern European TV channel) | Slovakia | A+ Anime | July 2, 2007 | C8 | March 31, 2014 |
| Animax (African TV channel) | South Africa | | November 3, 2007 | Sony MAX | February 1, 2011 |
| Animax (block on AXN Italy) | Italy | | January 12, 2008 | discontinued | 2008 |
| Animax (Portuguese TV channel) | Portugal | | April 12, 2008 | AXN Black | May 9, 2011 |
| Animax (Spanish TV channel) | Spain | | April 12, 2008 | discontinued | December 31, 2013 |
| Animax (block on SF) | Australia | | November 5, 2008 | discontinued | 2010 |

=== Asia ===
Asian versions of Animax, featuring its programming within separate networks and feeds in their respective regions and languages, were rolled out beginning in 2004. The first one was launched in Taiwan and the Philippines on January 1, 2004, and in Hong Kong on January 12, 2004. A week later, Animax launched in Southeast Asia on January 19, 2004, featuring its programming within feeds in English audio, as well as Japanese audio, with English subtitling, and other languages in the region, becoming the company's first English-language network.

On July 5, 2004, Animax India was launched across India and neighboring countries featuring its programming in English.

On April 29, 2006, Animax started its operations in South Korea, broadcasting separately from Seoul.

Animax Asia aired their first ever simulcast, Tears to Tiara, on the same time as the Japanese broadcast. They would also premiere Fullmetal Alchemist: Brotherhood series, within the same week as Japan.

In January 2020, Sony sold the South Korean and Southeast Asian Animax channels to former Sony Pictures Television executives Andy Kaplan and George Chien, who have since formed KC Global Media.

Animax ceased transmissions in Laos, 16 March 2021. One year later, Astro shut the channel down on 1 January 2022 in Malaysia.

=== Latin America ===
Animax was launched in Latin America on July 31, 2005, replacing Locomotion after Sony's purchase from Hearst Corporation and Corus Entertainment, in January 2005.

Animax Latin America would rebrand in August 2007, coinciding with the premiere of a new adult-oriented programming block named Lollipop. Likewise, on March 18, 2008, it was announced that the mobile service Animax Mobile, available on Japan and Australia, was to be launched as well in Mexico and eventually in other Latin American countries.

Animax Latin America would eventually incorporate live-action programming and was later relaunched as Sony Spin on May 1, 2011, with anime programming retained until March 2012. Sony Spin would be discontinued on July 1, 2014, and replaced with a local version of Lifetime.

=== North America ===
Animax has sponsored several anime-based events across North America, including hosting an anime festival, in association with other anime distributive enterprises such as Bandai Entertainment and Viz Media, across Sony's San Francisco-based entertainment shopping complex Metreon in October 2001, during which it aired numerous of its anime titles across the centre, including special Gundam, The Making of Metropolis, and Love Hina screenings.

The noted international business newspaper Financial Times, reported, in September 2004, of Sony planning and being "keen" to launch Animax across the United States and North America, after Sony had signed an agreement with the largest cable company in the United States, Comcast, with whom it had co-partnered in a US$4.8 billion acquisition of legendary Hollywood studio MGM, to bring at least three of Sony's television networks across the region.

On June 13, 2007, Sony Pictures Television International officially announced that Animax would be launching its mobile television service, Animax Mobile, in Canada from July 2007, on Bell Digital's mobile phone service. This was Animax Mobile's third major expansion, after initially launching the mobile television service in Japan from April 2007 and Australia from June 12, 2007.

On January 17, 2012, the streaming service Crackle, added Animax to their lineup for the North America region, marking the network's first launch in the United States. Its programming has included for the first time several of Animax's English language dubs, including that of shows that had yet been adapted into English and had only aired in Southeast Asia and South Asia prior, such as Nodame Cantabile, Yōkai Ningen Bem and several others. By the end of March 2013, the Animax branding was dropped.

=== Europe ===
In April 2007, Animax launched across several countries in Europe, including Hungary, Romania, the Czech Republic, Slovakia, with Sony announcing plans to launch in the United Kingdom, Germany, Italy, Spain, Portugal, France, Poland (put on hiatus) and other major countries in the continent, with discussions at an advanced stage. The launch marked Animax's first major expansion into Europe. The network then soon launched in Germany in May 2007, Spain and Portugal in 2008.

==== United Kingdom ====
In October 2007, further details emerged on Animax's launch details in the United Kingdom, with Sony Pictures Television International senior-vice president of international networks Ross Hair being quoted by Brand Republic's Media Week as stating that Sony was preparing to launch Animax in the United Kingdom initially as a video on demand service alongside other Sony television networks, with Sony also looking at launching Animax across the free digital television service Freeview subject to new frequencies and slot being available.

As of April 2011, one of Sony's 3 channels that they were planning to launch in the UK since 2007, Sony Entertainment Television, is now available there on Sky following Sony's acquisition of channel slots 157 and 190, which were previously owned by Film 24 and Open Access 3, respectively, not only making it now possible that Sony can launch Animax in the UK but also marking Sony Pictures Television's entry into both the British and Irish markets. On October 15, 2013, Sony Pictures Television announced it will launch a UK version of Animax as a SVOD service. SPT also announced a multi-year volume deal with Viz Media to secure exclusive content for the service.

The SVOD service launched online on October 24, 2013, with three simulcast series and over twenty archive series including many titles which originally debuted on Kaze's Anime On Demand service. Some content has also appeared on Sony Movie Channel's Late Night Anime block, with the channel's website referencing Animax. Starting from March 2014, the Late Night Anime block has since been rebranded to Animax. An app for PlayStation 4 was released in October 2014.

On March 5, 2015, Scuzz launched Animax Movie Nights, a weekly block that aired anime movies on Thursday nights for the next month.

On October 15, 2018, the service closed down, with subscribers being directed to Funimation's streaming service.

==== Hungary, Romania, Czech Republic and Slovakia ====
In September 2006, Sony Pictures Television International bought A+ (Anime+) television channel and rebranded it as Animax in July 2007 The channel aired from 8 pm to 2 am on same frequency as Minimax and broadcast anime in Japanese with Romanian subtitles and also with Romanian dubbing in Romania, with Hungarian dubbing in Hungary and with Czech dubbing for the most of them in the Czech Republic and Slovakia. Among the most popular series were: Naruto, Bleach, Fullmetal Alchemist, InuYasha, Death Note, D.Gray-man, Blood+, Kaleido Star, Hell Girl, Kilari, Dragon Ball GT, Kirarin Revolution, Love Com, Vampire Knight, MegaMan NT Warrior, Trigun, Slayers, Yu-Gi-Oh!, Digimon, Gankutsuou: The Count of Monte Cristo, Nana, Kiddy Grade, Tokyo Mew Mew.

On June 1, 2009, the channel changed its focus, targeting a more broad young adult audience and adding more American television series. At the same time, it dropped support of its forums on its website and, in September 2013, closed them entirely. On June 9, 2009, RCS & RDS (Digi), the largest Romanian cable operator dropped the channel due to high costs of broadcasting.

On March 31, 2014, the channel was closed down and replaced by C8.

Meanwhile, in Romania, Sony's AXN Spin was launched on 1 March 2013 on Romtelecom's digital lineup, a few months after both Minimax and Animax were dropped from that platform. Until 2015, AXN Spin broadcast Naruto, Dragon Ball GT, Dragon Ball Z Kai, Kinniku Banzuke, Kirarin Revolution and Hello Kitty.

==== Spain and Portugal ====
Animax began as a programming block in Spain and Portugal in the channel AXN. Shows broadcast on the block include InuYasha, Outlaw Star, Trigun, Orphen, Excel Saga and Samurai Champloo. Later shows include Corrector Yui, The Law of Ueki, Detective Conan, Lupin III and Kochikame. These shows were shown in Portugal and Spain from October 2007 until September 2008, airing weekends from 13:00 to 16:00.

The full channel was subsequently launched on April 12, 2008, on the Movistar TV and Digital+ platforms in Spain and Meo and Clix in Portugal. Among the series broadcast across Animax's networks in Spain and Portugal were Nana, Black Lagoon, Love Hina, Tsubasa: Reservoir Chronicle, Chobits, Devil May Cry. As of 2011, the Portuguese feed was removed due to low ratings and was replaced by AXN Black, an offshoot of AXN. In 2013, the Spanish feed rebranded and eliminated all of its western programming in favor for anime, although the programming consisted on continuous reruns of four anime, later reduced to two. On December 31, 2013, the Spanish feed was also removed due to its low ratings.

==== Italy ====
Animax in Italy began as a nighttime 1-hour programming block on sister channel AXN Italy on January 12, 2008, indicating that it will eventually launch as a 24/7 channel. The programs that aired on the block were Planetes, The Vision of Escaflowne, .hack//SIGN, and Noein. The block hasn't aired since 2009, likely to avoid competition with MTV, who also aired anime and was more widely available.

==== Germany ====
On May 14, 2007, Sony announced Animax would be launching in Germany from early June 2007, becoming the country's first ever television network solely dedicated to anime programming. Animax launched in the country from June 5, 2007, on Unity Media's digital subscription television service in the regions of North Rhine-Westphalia, Hesse and other regions. Among the first anime series premiering on Animax Germany were .hack//Sign, Dragon Ball, Earth Girl Arjuna, Eureka Seven, Gundam SEED, Oh My Goddess!, One Piece, Record of Lodoss War, School Rumble, The Candidate for Goddess, X and numerous others. The channel later launched into Austria and Switzerland.

Animax closed on July 7, 2016, but would continue as a VOD service in Germany, Austria and Switzerland, before it was replaced by Crunchyroll on September 30, 2022.

==== Poland ====
There were plans to launch the Polish version of the channel on January 1, 2008, but they never materialised, most likely due to financial issues.

=== Australia ===
Animax launched as a two-hour programming block on the Sci Fi Channel Australia (which was co-owned by Animax's parent Sony Pictures Entertainment) from November 5, 2008, playing on Wednesday nights and Saturday mornings. It launched with the series Ghost in the Shell: Stand Alone Complex, Cowboy Bebop, Black Lagoon and Blood+.

This was Animax's latest English-language venture, following their networks in Southeast Asia, South Asia and South Africa. As of 2010, the block no longer airs.

Animax programming has also been available since June 12, 2007, through its mobile television service, Animax Mobile, available on 3 mobile's 3G network. Its initial programming on launch consisted of four full-length anime series, Blood+, R.O.D the TV, Gankutsuou: The Count of Monte Cristo and Last Exile. As of 2016 Animax Mobile has been discontinued.

=== Africa ===
In August 2007, it was announced that Animax would be launching across several countries in Africa, including South Africa, Namibia, Zimbabwe, Botswana, Zambia, Mozambique and Lesotho, on the DStv satellite service and in Nigeria on HiTV, from March 19, 2009.

On 31 October 2010, Animax was removed from DSTV, due to a lack of viewers. The channel had engaged in channel drift with the introduction of reality shows to its line-up. It would be replaced by in February 2011 with Sony MAX.

==== South Africa ====
Animax broadcast on DStv from November 3, 2007, until October 31, 2010.

It featured English language programming. It had been lauded by publications such as The Times for having singularly spread awareness about anime than any other platform, and celebrated its first year of broadcasts in South Africa in November 2008. Sony Pictures Television International manager Philipp Schmidt was quoted by The Times as saying that Animax's primary goal was to "establish itself as the destination for anime programming" in South Africa, and also that the feedback that it has received has shown it has been making an impact in the country.

Animax South Africa premiered programs such as Neon Genesis Evangelion, Tenjo Tenge, Ghost in the Shell: Stand Alone Complex, Record of Lodoss War, .hack//SIGN, Negima! Magister Negi Magi, Mobile Suit Gundam SEED, Eureka Seven, Angelic Layer, SoltyRei, Black Cat, Hinotori, Final Fantasy: Unlimited, Chrono Crusade, Last Exile, Samurai 7, Burst Angel, Black Jack, Black Lagoon, Hellsing, Wolf's Rain, Basilisk, Gantz, Paranoia Agent, Witchblade, Elfen Lied, and Le Chevalier D'Eon.

== Other ventures ==
=== Animax Mobile ===
Apart from operating its programming as a television network, Animax begun launching its programming across mobile television, first beginning in their original home in Japan and subsequently overseas. In February 2007, Animax announced that it would be launching a mobile television service in Japan on the mobile phone company MOBAHO! from April 2007, having its programming being viewable by the company's mobile phone subscribers. Subsequently, in June 2007, it launched in Australia and Canada, its first English language mobile networks, in Latin America on March 18, 2008, and Southeast Asia on November and December 2008, their third mobile English language network, launching in Malaysia and Singapore through mobile service providers Astro, Maxis and StarHub respectively.

As of 2016 the Animax Mobile service is discontinued worldwide.

Animax-branded streaming channels are available in Hong Kong, Philippines, Indonesia, Singapore and Malaysia, Selected Countries also available On Demand Across Southeast Asia (Hong Kong, Singapore, Malaysia, Indonesia, Philippines) and Germany (Deutschland, Switzerland and Austria).

=== Game arenas ===
Sony Pictures Television International signed a deal with developer Arkadium on January 7, 2009, to provide game arenas for Sony Pictures Television International websites, including Animax, with more than forty games licensed.

== See also ==
- Animax Taishō
- List of programs broadcast by Animax
