= List of programmes broadcast by Animax =

This is a list of series broadcast by the Japanese satellite television network Animax.

== Japan ==
Animax is a Japanese, anime and animation broadcasting service. The Japanese service has programme information and schedules available from its official site.

== Currently broadcast ==
- Akage no An
- Ashita no Joe 2
- Bakugan Battle Brawlers
- Bakugan Battle Planet
- Berserk
- Bleach: The DiamondDust Rebellion
- Chibi Maruko-chan: Best Selection
- Code Geass: Lelouch of the Rebellion R2
- Combat Mecha Xabungle
- Cowboy Bebop
- D.Gray Man
- D.Gray Man Hallow
- Death Note
- Detective Conan
- Detective School Q
- Galaxy Express 999
- Ginga e Kickoff!
- Ginga: Nagareboshi Gin
- Glass no Kamen
- Go! Go! Go! Kart-kun
- Going Wild Going Green
- Great Teacher Onizuka
- Hataraki Man
- Hayate no Gotoku!
- Highlander: The Search for Vengeance
- Ikkyū-san
- Iron Man
- Jarinko Chie (a.k.a. Chie the Brat)
- Jigoku Shōjo: Mitsuganae
- Jinzō Konchū Kabuto Borg VXV
- Katekyō Hitman Reborn!
- Kenkō Zenrakei Suieibu Umishō
- Keroro Gunsō
- Kamiwaza Wanda
- Ketsu-Inu
- Kinnikuman: Kinnikusei Ōi Sōdatsu-hen (a.k.a. Kinnikuman: Scramble for the Throne)'
- Kochira Katsushika-ku Kameari Kōen-mae Hashutsujo
- Kodai Ōja Kyōryū King DKidz Adventure: Tsubasa-ryū Densetsu
- Lupin III Part II
- Macross Frontier
- Nana
- Nodame Cantabile
- Nuy Pole
- Ōkiku Furikabutte (a.k.a. Big Windup)
- Persona -trinity soul-
- Porphy no Nagai Tabi
- The Prince of Tennis Original Video Animation: Zenkoku Taikai-hen
- Real Drive
- The Rose of Versailles
- Pretty Cure (2004–2010)
- Sōten no Ken (a.k.a. Fist of the Blue Sky)
- Tales of the Abyss
- Tamagotchi!
  - Tamagotchi! Yume Kira Dream
  - Tamagotchi! Miracle Friends
  - Go-Go Tamagotchi!
- Tetsuwan Birdy: DECODE 02
- The Tower of Druaga: The Sword of Uruk
- Uchi no Sanshimai
- Ultraviolet: Code 044 (Animax's 10th anniversary original production)
- Yomigaeru Sora - Rescue Wings
- Zipang
- Zombie Loan

== Formerly broadcast ==
=== A ===
- A Certain Magical Index
- A Certain Scientific Railgun
- Accel World
- Acchi Kocchi (also known as Place to Place)
- Angel beats
- Aikatsu!
  - Aikatsu Stars!
  - Aikatsu Friends!
  - Aikatsu on Parade!
- Alice Academy
- Alice and Zoroku
- Arcana Famiglia
- Aria The Scarlet Ammo Double A (also known as Hidan No Aria)
- Ayakashi Japanese Classic Horror
- Anonymous Noise
- Arpeggio of Blue Steel
- Assassination Classroom

=== B ===
- Bleach
- The Boondocks
- Brynhildr in the Darkness

=== C ===
- The Candidate for Goddess
- Captain
- Captain (movie)
- Captain Herlock
- Captain Tsubasa
  - Captain Tsubasa: European Challenge
  - Captain Tsubasa J
  - Captain Tsubasa: Junior World Cup
- Cardcaptor Sakura
- Cardfight!! Vanguard
- Chainsaw Man
- Charawood Project
- Chobits
- Chrono Crusade
- Chūka Ichiban
- Clamp School
- Code Geass: Lelouch of the Rebellion
- Cosmo Warrior Zero
- Cowboy Bebop: Knockin' on Heaven's Door
- Crush Gear Turbo
- Curious Play
- Cyborg 009
- Cyborg Kurochan
- Charlotte (anime)
- Chrome Shelled Regois
- Chihayafuru
  - Chihayafuru 2
- Colour Cloud Palace
- Chaos;Child
- Cute High Earth Defense Club LOVE!

=== D ===
- D.Gray-man
  - D.Gray-man Hallow
- D.N.Angel
- Daigunder
- Danball Senki
  - Danball Senki Wars
  - Danball Senki W
- Darker than Black
- Death Note
- Dear Boys
- DearS
- Demon Lord Dante
- Detective Conan
- Detective School Q
- Di Gi Charat Nyo!
- D.I.C.E.
- Digimon Adventure
  - Digimon Adventure 02
  - Digimon Savers
- DNA^{2}
- Doctor Dokkiri
- Dr. Slump
- Dokonjō Gaeru (also known as Dokonjo Gaeru and Dokonjō Kaeru)
- Dotto! Koni-chan
- Dragon Ball
- Dragon Ball GT
- Dragon Ball Super
- Dragon Ball Z
  - Dragon Ball Z: Bio-Broly
  - Dragon Ball Z: Broly - Second Coming
- DT Eightron

=== E ===
- Eight Clouds Rising
- Emma - A Victorian Romance
  - Emma - A Victorian Romance: Second Act
- Elmo's World
- Eon Kid
- Ergo Proxy
- Eureka 7
- éX-Driver
  - éX-Driver - The Movie
- Excel Saga
- Eyeshield 21

=== F ===
- Fairy Tail
- Famex the Phoenix
- The Family's Defensive Alliance
- Fancy Lala
- Fang of the Sun Dougram
- Fantastic Children
- Fate/stay night
- Final Fantasy VII Advent Children
- Flame of Recca
- Flanders no Inu
  - Gekijōban: Flanders no Inu
- FREEDOM
- Full Metal Panic!
  - Full Metal Panic? Fumoffu
  - Full Metal Panic!: The Second Raid
- Fullmetal Alchemist
  - Fullmetal Alchemist the Movie: Conqueror of Shamballa
- Fushigi no Umi no Nadia
  - Gekijōban: Fushigi no Umi no Nadia
- Futari wa Pretty Cure
  - Fresh Pretty Cure!
  - Futari wa Pretty Cure: Max Heart
  - Futari wa Pretty Cure Splash Star
  - HeartCatch Pretty Cure!
  - Suite Pretty Cure
  - Yes! Pretty Cure 5
  - Yes Pretty Cure 5 GoGo!
- Future Boy Conan

=== G ===
- Gabriel Dropout
- Gad Guard
- Galaxy Angel
  - Galaxy Angel A
  - Galaxy Angel OVA
  - Galaxy Angel X
  - Galaxy Angel Z
- The Galaxy Railways
- Gallery Fake
  - Gekijo-ban: Ginga Tetsudō 999 (劇場版 銀河鉄道999)
- Ganba
- Gankutsuou: The Count of Monte Cristo
- Gantz
- Gasaraki
- Gekijōban Marco: 3000 Leagues in Search of Mother (movie)
- Geneshaft
- Genma Taisen (a.k.a. Ghenma Wars)
- GetBackers
- Ghost in the Shell
- Ghost in the Shell 2: Innocence
- Ghost in the Shell: Stand Alone Complex
  - Ghost in the Shell: S.A.C. The Laughing Man (攻殻機動隊STAND ALONE COMPLEX The Laughing Man)
  - Ghost in the Shell: S.A.C. 2nd GIG Individual Eleven (攻殻機動隊S.A.C. 2ndGIG Individual Eleven)
- Ghost in the Shell: Stand Alone Complex - Solid State Society (攻殻機動隊STAND ALONE COMPLEX Solid State Society)
- Ghosts at School
- Ginban Kaleidoscope
- Ginga Densetsu Weed
- Ginga Hyōryū Vifam (1983 series; produced by Sunrise)
- Ginga: Nagareboshi Gin
- Ginga Tetsudō 999 (銀河鉄道999)
- Ginyū Mokushiroku Meine Liebe (吟遊黙示録マイネリーベ)
- Girls' Last Tour
- Glass no Kantai
- Gokusen
- Golden Time
- Gorillaman (ゴリラーマン, Gorirrāman)
- Graduation - Sailor Victory
- Great Teacher Onizuka
- Grimgar of Fantasy and Ash
- Guilty Crown
- Gun Frontier
- Gundam series
  - Mobile Suit Gundam
  - Mobile Suit Gundam 1 (機動戦士ガンダムI（特別版）)
  - Mobile Suit Gundam II: Soldiers of Sorrow (機動戦士ガンダムII 哀・戦士編（特別版）)
  - Mobile Suit Gundam III: Encounters in Space (機動戦士ガンダムIII めぐりあい宇宙編（特別版）)
  - Mobile Suit Zeta Gundam
  - Mobile Suit Zeta Gundam A New Translation: Heirs to the Stars (機動戦士Zガンダム －星を継ぐ者－)
  - Mobile Suit Zeta Gundam A New Translation II: Lovers (機動戦士ZガンダムII －恋人たち－)
  - Mobile Suit Zeta Gundam A New Translation III: Love is the Pulse of the Stars (機動戦士ZガンダムIII －星の鼓動は愛－)
  - Mobile Suit Gundam: Char's Counterattack
  - Mobile Suit Gundam ZZ
  - Mobile Suit Gundam 0080: War in the Pocket
  - Mobile Suit Gundam F91
  - Mobile Suit Gundam 0083: Stardust Memory
  - Mobile Suit Victory Gundam
  - Mobile Fighter G Gundam
  - Mobile Suit Gundam Wing
  - After War Gundam X
  - Turn A Gundam
  - Mobile Suit Gundam SEED
  - Mobile Suit Gundam SEED DESTINY
- Gunparade Orchestra
- Gunslinger Girl
- Gurren Lagann

=== H ===
- .hack//SIGN
  - .hack//Legend of the Twilight
  - .hack//Roots
- Handa-kun
- Haikara-san ga Tōru
- Hanare Toride no Yonna (はなれ砦のヨナ, a.k.a. Yonna in the Solitary Fortress)
- Harlock Saga
- Haruhi Suzumiya
- Hayate no Gotoku (ハヤテのごとく！)
- He Is My Master
- Heat Guy J
- Hellsing
- Hellsing Ultimate
- Hey! Bumboo (へーい!ブンブー)
- Hello!!Kinmoza(also known as Hello!!Kin-iro Mosaic)
- High School! Kimengumi
- Hikaru no Go
- Himesama Goyōjin
- Hiwou War Chronicles
- Honey and Clover
- Honey and Clover II
- Hoshi no Koe - also known as Voices of a Distant Star
- Hoshizora Kiseki (星空キセキ)
- Hokuto no Ken (北斗の拳)
  - Seikimatsu Kyūseishu Densetsu: Hokuto no Ken (世紀末救世主伝説 北斗の拳)
- Hungry Heart: Wild Striker
- Hunter X Hunter (new series)
- Hunter x Hunter
- Hunter x Hunter OVA
- Hyouka
- Hyper Speed GranDoll

=== I ===
- Ichigo 100%
- Infinite Ryvius
- Inari, Konkon, Koi Iroha
- Initial D
- Invaders of the Rokujyōma!?
- I'm Gonna Be An Angel!, also known as I Wanna Be An Angel!
- Inuyasha

=== J ===
- Jigoku Shōjo Futakomori
- Jinki: Extend
- Jinzo Konchu Kabutoborg VxV
- Jubei-chan 2
- Jubei-chan the Ninja Girl
- Jujutsu Kaisen
- Jūsō Kikō Dancouga Nova
- Jyu Oh Sei

=== K ===
- Kakurenbo (カクレンボ)
- Kamichama Karin
- Kamichu! - also known as Teenage Goddess
- Kamisama Kazoku (神様家族)
- Kamisama Kiss (2 seasons)
- Kappa no Kaikata (カッパの飼い方)
- Karin
- Kenpū Denki Berserk
- Keroro Gunsō
- Kill Me Baby
- Kino's Journey
- Kiteretsu Daihyakka
- Kirby: Right Back at Ya!
- Kitty's Paradise Plus (キティズパラダイスPLUS Kitizuparadaisu PLUS)
- Kotencotenco (こてんこてんこ)
- Kotoura San
- Kumo no Mukō, Yakusoku no Basho - also known as Beyond the Clouds, the Promised Place
- KURAU Phantom Memory
- Kyo Kara Maoh! (Seasons 1 & 2)
- Kyojin no Hoshi (巨人の星)
- Kyojin no Hoshi: Tokubetsu-hen: Mōko Hanagata Mitsuru
- Kyoukara Oreha ! ! (今日から俺は！！)

=== L ===
- Lady Georgie (レディジョージィ)
- LaMB (Animax original)
- Last Exile
- Le Chevalier D'eon
- Legendz: Tale of the Dragon Kings
- Les Misérables: Shōjo Cosette
- Letter (レター)
- Lily to Kaeru to (Ototo) (リリとカエルと（弟）, Riri to Kaeru to (Ototo))
- Little Women
- Living for the Day After Tomorrow
- Love, Chunibyo & Other Delusions
- Love Live!
  - Love Live! School Idol Project
  - Love Live! Sunshine!!
  - Love Live! Nijigasaki High School Idol Club
  - Love Live! Superstar!!
- Lunar Legend Tsukihime
- Lupin III
- Legend of the Glass Fleet
- Law of Ueki
- Luck and Logic

=== M ===
- Macross: The Super Dimensional Fortress Macross
- Macross Dynamite 7
- Magic User's Club
- Magical Meow Meow Taruto
- Magical Warfare
- Magical Princess Minky Momo
- Magikano
- Majime ni Fumajime Kaiketsu Zorori (まじめにふまじめ かいけつゾロリ)
  - Gekijōban Majime ni Fumajime Kaiketsu Zorori Nazo no Otakara Daisakusen (劇場版 まじめにふまじめ かいけつゾロリ なぞのお宝大さくせん) (movie)
- Makasate Iruka!
- Maria-sama ga Miteru (a.k.a. Maria Watches Over Us)
- Mars, The Terminator
- Marshmallow Tsūshin (マシュマロ通信)
- Martian Successor Nadesico
- Matantei Loki Ragnarok
- Meine Liebe
  - Meine Liebe Wieder
- Melty Lancer
- Midnight Horror School
- Midori Days
- Monkey Typhoon
- Monster
- Mugensenki Portoriss (無限戦記ポトリス) a.k.a. Tank Knight Portoriss/Portriss
- Mujin Wakusei Survive
- MUSASHI GUNDOH
- Mushishi
- Music Station
- Myriad Colors Phantom World

=== N ===
- Nisekoi
- Najica
- Naruto
  - Naruto the Movie: Ninja Clash in the Land of Snow
  - Naruto the Movie 2: Legend of the Stone of Gelel
  - Naruto the Movie 3: Guardians of the Crescent Moon Kingdom
- Naruto: Shippūden
  - Naruto: Shippūden the Movie
- Nasu: Summer in Andalusia
- Neon Genesis Evangelion
- Ninku
- Nisekoi (transferred to Aniplus Asia)
- Night Head Genesis
- Ningyō Animation Licca-chan
- Noir
- Nuy Pole
- Nodame Cantabile

=== O ===
- Offside
- Ohayo! Spank
- Oku-sama wa Joshi Kōsei
- One Piece
- Onegai My Melody
- Osomatsu kun
- Otogi Zoshi
- Ouran High School Host Club
- Outlaw Star
- Overman King Gainer

=== P ===
- Palme no Ki (パルムの樹, Parumu no Ki; a.k.a. A Tree of Palme)
- Panda-Z
- Panty and Stocking
- Paradise Kiss
- Parasyte
- Persona 4: The Animation
- Persona 4: The Golden Animation
- Persona 5: The Animation
- Photo Kano
- Play Ball
  - Play Ball 2nd
- Please Teacher!
- Pilot Candidate
- Pita-Ten
- Place to Place
- Pokémon
- Power Stone
- Pretty Rhythm: Aurora Dream
  - Pretty Rhythm: Dear My Future
  - Pretty Rhythm: Rainbow Live
- PriPara
  - Idol Time PriPara
- Princess Comet (also known as Cosmic Baton-girl Comet-san)
- Princess Principal (also known as Purinsesu Purinshiparu)
- Princess Sarah
- Princess Tutu
- Prince of Tennis

=== R ===
- R.O.D the TV
- Ran, The Samurai Girl
- Ranma ½
- REC
- Record of Lodoss War
- Remi, Nobody's Girl
- Ring ni Kakero
- The Rose of Versailles
- Rozen Maiden
- Ruin Explorers
- Rurouni Kenshin
  - Rurouni Kenshin: Ishin Shishi no Requiem
  - Rurouni Kenshin: Seishou Hen
  - Rurouni Kenshin: Tsuioku Hen
- Ryūsei Sentai Musumetto (流星戦隊ムスメット)
- Ryo work has never done

=== S ===
- S-CRY-ed
- Saber Marionette
  - Saber Marionette J
  - Saber Marionette J Again!
  - Saber Marionette J to X
  - Saber Marionette R
  - Saber Marionette Z
- Saikano (also known as She, the Ultimate Weapon)
- Sailor Moon
- Saint Seiya
- Saiyuki Reload (also known as Journey to the West)
  - Saiyuki Reload Gunlock
- Samurai 7
- Samurai Champloo
- Sasami☆Mahō Shoujo Club
- Sasuga no Sarutobi
- Save Me Lollipop
- School Rumble
- Scrapped Princess
- Serial Experiments Lain
- Sentō Yōsei Yukikaze
- Shakugan no Shana
- Shaman King
- Shamanic Princess
- Shangri-La
- Shima Shima Tora no Shimajirō
  - Hakken Taiken Daisuki! Shimajirō
- Shin Kaitei Gunkan
- Shin Onimusha: DAWN OF DREAMS THE STORY (film)
- Shinshaku Sengoku Eiyū Densetsu Sanada Jyū Yūshi The Animation
- Shonen Onmyouji
- Shugo Chara!
- Silent Mobius
- SKET Dance
- Slam Dunk
- Snow White with the Red Hair
- Sonic X
- Sorcerous Stabber Orphen
- Sorcerous Stabber Orphen: The Revenge
- Soul Hunter (also known as Senkaiden Houshin Engi)
- Space Runaway Ideon (伝説巨神イデオン Densetsu Kyojin Ideon)
  - Space Runaway Ideon: Be Invoked (伝説巨神イデオン 発動篇, Densetsu Kyojin Ideon: Hatsudō-hen)
  - Space Runaway Ideon: A Contact (伝説巨神イデオン 接触篇, Densetsu Kyojin Ideon: Sesshoku-hen)
- Space Dandy
- Speed Grapher
- Spirit of Wonder
- Spooky Kitaro 4
- Sword Art Online
- Star Driver: Shining Takuto
- Steel Angel Kurumi
- Stigma of the Wind
- Stratos 4
- Strike the Blood
- Submarine Super 99
- The Super Milk-chan Show
- Superkuma-san (スーパークマさん)

=== T ===
- Tactics
- Takahashi Rumiko Gekijō: Ningyō no Mori (高橋留美子劇場 人魚の森)
- Tales of the Abyss
- Tama & Friends Sagase! Mahō no Punipunisutoon (タマ&フレンズ 探せ！魔法のプニプニストーン)
- Tamako Market
- Tears to tiara
- Tenjho Tenge
- Terra e (地球へ・・・, a.k.a. Toward the Terra) from May 2007
- Texhnolyze
- The Asterisk War
- The Irregular at Magic High School (transferred to Aniplus Asia)
- The Testament of Sister New Devil
- This Ugly Yet Beautiful World
- Tokyo Ghoul
- Tokyo Majin Gakuen Kenpuchō: Tō (東京魔人學園剣風帖 龍龍) (premiered exclusively on Animax from 19 January 2007)
- Totte Oki A-News (special Animax original anime news program, hosted by Nana Akiyama, Vincent Giry (a.k.a. Jiri Vanson), and newscast by Ryūsuke Hikawa)
- Tokyo Mew Mew
- Touch
- Touch: Miss Lonely Yesterday
- The Tower of Druaga
- Trinity Blood
- The Twelve Kingdoms
- Twilight Q
- Twin Spica
- Twin Star Exorcists
- The File Of Young Kindaichi

=== U ===
- UFO Baby
- Ultra Maniac
- Unbreakable Machine-Doll
- Urusei Yatsura (also known as Lum, Lamu, The Invader Girl, Those Obnoxious Aliens and Alien Musibat)

=== V ===
- Vampire Hunter D
- Vandread
  - Vandread Gekitouhen
  - Vandread: The Second Stage
  - Vandread Taidouhen
- Viking
- Virgin Fleet
- The Vision of Escaflowne
  - Escaflowne the Movie
- Valvrave the Liberator

=== W ===
- Wakusei Daikaijû Negadon (a.k.a. Negadon: The Monster from Mars)
- The World God Only Knows
- Wangan Midnight (湾岸MIDNIGHT)
- Whistle!
- Wild 7
- Windy Tales
- Winter Sonata
- Witch Hunter Robin
- Wolf's Rain
- World Masterpiece Theater
  - Ai Shoujo Pollyanna Monogatari
  - Flanders no Inu
  - Kon'nichiwa Anne 〜 Before Green Gables
  - Les Misérables: Shōjo Cosette
  - Little Women
  - Porphy no Negai Tabi
  - Princess Sarah
  - Remi, Nobody's Girl
  - Romeo no Aoi Sora

=== X ===
- X
- xxxHolic

=== Y ===
- Yakitate!! Ja-pan
- Yami to Bōshi to Hon no Tabibito
- You're Under Arrest
- Yo-kai Watch
- Yukikaze
- Yumedamaya Kidan (ゆめだまや奇談)
- YuYu Hakusho
- Yu-Gi-Oh!
  - Yu-Gi-Oh! Duel Monsters
  - Yu-Gi-Oh! GX
  - Yu-Gi-Oh! 5D's
  - Yu-Gi-Oh! Zexal
  - Yu-Gi-Oh! Arc-V
  - Yu-Gi-Oh! VRAINS

=== Z ===
- Z.O.E: Dolores, i
- Zipang
