= List of Viper's Creed episodes =

Artwork for Viper's Creed DVD, Volume 1 released only in Japan.

The following is a list of episodes for Viper's Creed, which had aired on the Animax and BS11 channels in Japan since January 6, 2009. It was created by Sony Pictures Japan and animated by AIC Spirits and Digital Frontier. The roles of Saiki Cryde and Kariya Sakurako, the main characters of the show, were given to voice actors Takaya Kuroda and Megumi Toyoguchi.

Viper's Creed takes place in the near future where a PMC named Arqon Global Security is mandated to provide law enforcement and self-defense protection for the people of Fort Daiva City, a city rebuilt over the ruins of abandoned and flooded cities after the Earth was affected by global warming followed by a third world war which nearly destroyed the world.

Hiroyuki Kanbe is the director of Viper's Creed with Shinji Aramaki being the show's main chief director after screenplay writer Ai Ōta announced on her blog that Shinji Aramaki would be involved in the conception of the show. Viper's Creed uses one opening and ending song. The opening is called R.O.C.K. by iLL with a CD single released on January 28, 2009 while the ending Ai no Oto (愛の音) is sung in English by moumoon, which was released as a CD single and as a CD single with a DVD on February 25, 2009.

Region 2 DVDs of Viper's Creed have been released in Japan with 3 episodes each. As of October 2009, Volume 1 was released on August 5, 2009 with Volume 2 released on September 2, 2009. Volume 3 was released on October 7, 2009.

== Episode list ==
No.	Title	Original release date	English airdate
1	Eyed; Transliteration: "Dokugan -cyclops-" (Japanese: 独眼 -cyclops-)	January 6, 2009	October 21, 2011
AGS Blademen Unit "VIPER" is deployed to pursue a Megasoma Bugmech en route to Daiva City. The Megasoma puts up a tough offensive against the AQS Maneuver-Blades, nearly forcing the army to intervene after the Blademen sustain casualties to eliminate the armed Bugmech. One of the Blademan operatives, Saiki Cryde, decides to sacrifice his Maneuver-Blade by self-destructing it in order to blow up the Megamsoma; taking a section of a highway along with it. In the end, Saiki is forced to give up most of his incentive pay for the highway's repairs despite having eliminated the threat.
2	Recruit; Transliteration: "Shinpei -unknown-" (Japanese: 新兵 -unknown-)	January 13, 2009	October 28, 2011
Haruki Oguma, the only son of AGS President Fuyuhiko Oguma, is selected to be an AQS Blademan operative despite his father's wishes for him not do so in order to prove that he can protect Fort Daiva City and its people by himself and not by his father's influence. His presence brings some doubt to the other veteran Blademen, including Saiki, due to his ties with the company's president. During an AGS operation to hunt down Gellis Bugmechs, Haruki receives orders to immediately withdraw. However, he disobeys orders and hunts down the Gellis with Saiki accompanying the young Blademan, and they are able to defeat squads of Gellises on their own.
3	"-gunshot-" Shot; Transliteration: "Jūsei" (Japanese: 銃声)	January 20, 2009	November 4, 2011
Saiki is blamed for the killing of a local man who fired on the Blademan in an anti-Bugmech operation that resulted in civilian casualties. In the course of hiding from the police, Saiki is given shelter by an old friend from his war days, named Doc- while Kariya tries to obtain information covertly on the culprit responsible for framing him. During her investigation, she finds out that one of their own might be the real shooter in the death of the homeless man and has framed Saiki in his place. She enlists the assistance of Haruki to help her locate the culprit while Norma and Rudra are on the scene to capture the culprit for monetary gains.
4	"-sorceress-" Witch; Transliteration: "Majo" (Japanese: 魔女)	January 27, 2009	November 11, 2011
After a young elementary school student is kidnapped from a monorail by an unknown man, Norma begins working alone to provide ransom money to save her from her captors. However, the car used to transport her has been planted with a Ticker bomb by an Acromantis Bugmech. When Norma is wounded by a gunman in the outskirts of Daiva City, she reveals to Kariya and Saiki that the girl's name is Marie and that she is her only daughter. Because of their time together as homeless refugees after escaping from war, Norma gave Marie up for adoption due to having a lack of necessities needed to provide care for her and that she became a Blademan operative in order to ensure that Marie is taken care of.
5	Reaper; Transliteration: "Shinigami -Grim Reaper-" (Japanese: 死神 -Grim Reaper-)	February 3, 2009	TBA
Police arrest Rudra as the main suspect responsible for the assassination of a public official who was killed by someone using a sniper rifle-armed Maneuver-Blade mecha- despite him being present with the other AGS personnel during an anti-terrorist operation. After his released from police custody with the intervention of AGS officials, Rudra surmises that the main culprit responsible for the attack on the official was someone from his past. He soon encounters Maya, a very intelligent woman who was his skilled sniper/spotter from his World War III days as an anti-government guerrilla after an attempt is announced on President Oguma.
6	Do Not; Transliteration: "Deku -golem-" (Japanese: 木偶 -golem-)	February 10, 2009	TBA
When Haruki invites Saiki, Kariya and Gharib to eat with him in a local Asian ethnic restaurant for dinner, the four AGS personnel find out that the owner is subjected to a huge debt. However, Gharib finds out that the one sent to collect the debt on the restaurant is an ex-soldier who had trained under him during Gharib's day as a military officer when the soldier's hands were disabled after Gharib saved his life by shooting an armed landmine out of his hands. Determined to save the restaurant and do something about his life once more, Gharib decides to help the owner's daughter to move on from the past and assist her in her cooking skills.
7	Mayhem; Transliteration: "Sōran -riot-" (Japanese: 騒乱 -riot-)	February 17, 2009	TBA
An anti-AGS riot turns sour when Rudra threatens to use force to quell the mob after a bombing incident is credited to theHounds, a group of supposedly anti-PMC terrorists. When mainstream news media claim that they were simply just extremists not out to kill, Haruki has doubts over the claims and visits Ulla Chiaki, the main leader of Hounds and a friend of Haruki who tells him that he and the others didn't plant the bomb in the mall. However, public pressure over pro and anti-Hound groups forces AGS to conduct an anti-terrorist mission. The Blademen are deployed to locate them, only for their systems to be hacked in order to give Ulla and the others the chance to escape.
8	Paradise; Transliteration: "Rakuen -eden-" (Japanese: 楽園 -eden-)	February 24, 2009	TBA
Theresia Strauss, an AGS official inspector, suggests to Fuyuhiko Oguma that Haruki was the most likely culprit for yesterday's failed mission. Doubt begins to surface from within the Blademen unit when Norma suggests that a double agent was responsible for their recent anti-Hounds operation. Haruki encounters Ulla, who is seen speaking with Theresia in an abandoned church. He later returns to AGS headquarters and finds a hidden garden of flowers created by his father to honor his late mother. Haruki is assassinated in the building after his encounter with Ulla, with Kariya and Saiki being the only witnesses to his death.
9	Plot; Transliteration: "Bōryaku -intrigue-" (Japanese: 謀略 -intrigue-)	March 3, 2009	TBA
AGS goes out to the public by using Haruki's death to further propagate anti-Hound operations and to promote AGS, deploying the Viper unit to a Hound safehouse, where the military intervenes to arrest them instead. The unit is then blamed for massacring the Hound members who had peacefully surrendered as terrorists in a news report, forcing Saiki and the others to hide from public view while AGS security forces are mobilized to hunt them down before the police and the military apprehend them themselves. Saiki is able to escape being killed after he attacks intruding masked men, who are revealed to be military commandos. The other members of the Viper unit also are forced to contend with masked commandos, in their rush to escape and regroup in order to figure out what's going on.
10	Counterattack; Transliteration: "Hangeki -counterattack-" (Japanese: 反撃 -counterattack-)	March 10, 2009	TBA
Ulla Chiaki, the leader of the Hound, appears on national television and accuses the Vipers of killing his fellow members. Jimmy, an AGS technician, assists Kariya in escaping from AGS custody with the assistance of a hacker named Ageha. The Viper members gather together in an abandoned warehouse off the grid in order to avoid being caught by AGS security forces and law enforcement. In order to find out who was responsible for framing them as terrorists, Saiki then leads the Vipers in storming AGS headquarters to reacquire their Maneuver-Blades. During their escape, Norma is killed while holding off two VTOL jets by ramming her Maneuver-Blade into them after being wounded by Utsugi, one of the kidnappers who was the mastermind behind kidnapping her daughter for ransom.
11	Truth; Transliteration: "Shinjitsu -truth-" (Japanese: 真実 -truth-)	March 17, 2009	TBA
Theresia and the renegade military faction are able to seize control of AGS with help from Ulla, who has been assisting them all along from the shadows. A Bugmech is launched against the public to further blame Saiki and the other Blademen as "terrorists". Saiki and the other Blademen, including Kariya, remain in hiding while receiving assistance from an unlikely ally. A covert operation is then launched by renegade soldiers to kill the Blademen in a mob-owned restaurant. Gharib stays behind to assist his AGS Blademen colleagues in escaping with their lives by charging the soldiers in a rage of fury before detonating two grenades. After Saiki, Rudra, Kariya, and Ageha are attacked while trying to escape, Rudra falls back to provide cover and sacrifices himself in a battle with military snipers after his Maneuver-Blade malfunctions.
12	Eye; Transliteration: "Sekigan -blindness-" (Japanese: 隻眼 -blindness-)	March 24, 2009	TBA
Saiki faces off against Ulla, who is piloting a Maneuver-Blade prototype that severely wounds him to the point that he is blinded. Because he can no longer see, Saiki asks Kariya to assist him in guiding him to the Daiva Broadcasting building by using his World War III-era Maneuver-Blade since Ulla seriously disabled his previous Maneuver-Blade. Ageha uses her skills to hack the controls of the Bugmechs from the military and uses them against Ulla. Jimmy is able to broadcast the real footage of the Hounds being shot to death by soldiers, turning the AGS security forces against the military before they could take over the Daiva Broadcasting building. In the course of events, Ulla is killed when Saiki guns him down. In the aftermath of events, Haruki appears before the AGS employees and takes over AGS as president and promptly changes the name to Daiva Security while his father, Fumihiko- retires to tend to the sunflowers. Kariya and Jimmy return to work as DS employees. Saiki, on the other hand, disappears from Daiva City with no one knowing where he is.
