= Masao Takiyama =

Japanese film producer

Masao Takiyama (滝山 正夫 or 滝山 雅夫, Takiyama Masao) is a Japanese anime producer and production designer who is currently the executive officer and chairman of the Japanese satellite television network Action Channel, Mystery Channel and The Cinema. Each subsidiaries of AXN Co., Ltd.

== Biography ==
A noted anime producer and production designer, Takiyama first began his career in anime with Fuji Creative Corporation, a subsidiary of Fuji Television, where he was influential for producing numerous noted anime series and licensing them for release across several overseas and international markets, including Europe. He first joined Sony Pictures Entertainment Japan in 1998, being influential in launching Animax, which became the first ever television network dedicated solely to anime. He also produced the acclaimed Satoshi Kon-directed films Tokyo Godfathers and Paprika, and has sat on numerous well-known summits on Japanese animation. In addition to his management and production responsibilities, Takiyama has also sat on the panels of numerous Animax events. He has received a bachelor of arts degree of the Department of Literature of Kokugakuin University in 1973.

== Productions ==
=== Anime television series ===
- Serendipity Monogatari: Pyua-tō no Nakama-tachi (1983)
- Time Travel Tondekeman (1989)
- Ningyo Hime Marina no Bōken (1991)
- Ashita e Free Kick (1992)
- Jura Tripper (1995)
- Kogepan (2001)
- Hungry Heart: Wild Striker (2002–03)
- Ultra Maniac (2003)
- Aishiteruze Baby (2004)
- Gallery Fake (2005)
- Jinzō Konchū Kabuto Borg VXV (2006–2007)
- Jūsō Kikō Dancouga Nova (2007)
- Persona: Trinity Soul (2008)
- Kurozuka (2008)
- Viper's Creed (2009)

=== Live-action series ===
- Ultra Q: Dark Fantasy (2004)

=== OVA ===
- Key the Metal Idol (1994)
- Ultra Maniac (2002)

=== Films ===
- The Lawnmower Man (1992)
- Screamers (1995)
- Metropolis (2001)
- Tokyo Godfathers (2003)
- Steamboy (2004)
- Paprika (2006)
- Resident Evil: Degeneration (2008)
