= Animax (Eastern European TV channel) =

Japanese anime television network

- Final logo used from 2007 to 2014
- Broadcast area: Hungary; Romania; Czech Republic; Poland; Slovakia
- Network: Animax

Programming
- Picture format: 576i (SDTV – Analog, PAL)

Ownership
- Owner: Sony Pictures Television
- Sister channels: Minimax

History
- Launched: 2 July 2007
- Replaced: A+ Anime
- Closed: 31 March 2014
- Replaced by: C8 (Hungary and Romania)
- Former names: A+

Links
- Website: Official website (in Hungarian); Official website (in Romanian); Official website (in Czech)

Animax (formerly A+) was a thematic television channel which broadcast Japanese animated television series and films to Eastern European countries, including Hungary, Romania, the Czech Republic, Slovakia.

== History ==
Animax Eastern Europe replaced A+ Anime in Hungary, Romania, the Czech Republic, and Slovakia on 2 July 2007. This was Animax's first major expansion to Europe.

For its whole permanence on Eastern Europe, Animax had shared frequency space with Minimax, broadcasting from 8PM to 2AM. The channel broadcast its programmes either dubbed in the local language of each country, or in Japanese audio with local subtitles.

The channel was closed on 31 March 2014 and was replaced by the Chellomedia channel C8. C8 started broadcasting in Hungary on 1 April 2014, and in Romania, Czech Republic and Slovakia on 5 May 2014, but in Hungary and Romania, it went defunct.

A+ Anime logo used 4 December 2004 to 2 July 2007

== Sister channels ==
- Minimax
- Megamax
