= Supermax (TV channel) =

Former Czech cable television channel

- Country: Czech Republic
- Broadcast area: Czech Republic, Slovakia

Programming
- Language: Czech

History
- Launched: 22 November 1994
- Closed: 15 September 2004
- Replaced by: Minimax; Fox Kids

Supermax was a Czech cable television channel that featured mostly animated television programs for teens and preteens. It started broadcast on 22 November 1994 (together with HBO Czech and Max1 – now Spektrum TV) and without any commercials. Supermax was completely taken off the air on 15 September 2004 and replaced by the children channel Minimax that was launched earlier on 1 January that year and Fox Kids that later rebranded to Jetix on 1 January 2005.

The channel was designed by Stephen Cohen, along with "Max1", as part of a package to attract sales to Czech and Slovak cable TV operators. It was based in Prague and initially was pre-recorded in 3-hour segments on long-play VHS tape cassettes which automatically switched and re-wound to create a 12-hour broadcast schedule. During its lifespan it aired numerous shows (over 200), mostly English shows dubbed into Czech. One of the most memorable series was Cybernet (pronounced "Kybernet") that showed reviews and screenshots from upcoming games and still airs around in parts of the world time to time. "Bláznivé sporty", a show made completely of homemade videos which showed hilarious situations at sport events was also popular. Other featured shows were Friends, Fresh Prince of Bel Air, Rugrats, G.eek, Animaniacs, Fly Tales, Pinky and the Brain, Thundercats, Silverhawks, Are You Afraid of the Dark?, Count Duckula, The Sylvester & Tweety Mysteries, Tom and Jerry, Ric Der Rabe, Jumanji, The Mask Animated Series, Student Bodies, Conan Adventurer, Tigersharks, Galaxy Rangers, Transformers G1, Heartbreak High, Mighty Morphin Power Rangers, Ocean Girl, Doug, CatDog, So Weird, Spider-Man, Biker Mice from Mars, WildC.A.T.S. and many more.

The channel showed anime movies on Easter Day, yet this practice was stopped some years ago. Also on Easter day the channel showed a dubbed version of Rock and Rule .

At the end of its run, it showed the sitcom Kenan & Kel.

The channel ceased broadcasting on 15 September 2004 at 9:30pm due to lack of agreement on both parties involving its broadcast and because of lower ratings.

The channel's cancellation and replacement by Minimax and Fox Kids spurred a great upheaval by many loyal fans. Most of them argued that Supermax featured better and more mature shows.
