= Ultraviolet: Code 044 =

Japanese anime television series

- Promotional poster
- ウルトラヴァイオレット:コード044
- Genre: Science fiction
- Written by: Osamu Dezaki; Kurt Wimmer
- Directed by: Osamu Dezaki
- Music by: Shusei Murai; Klaus Badelt
- No. of episodes: 12

Production
- Producers: Masao Maruyama; Taro Morishima
- Animator: Madhouse
- Production company: Sony Pictures Entertainment Japan

Original release
- Network: Animax
- Release: July 1 – September 16, 2008

Ultraviolet: Code 044 (Japanese: ウルトラヴァイオレット:コード044, Hepburn: Urutoravaioretto: Kōdo Zero Fōtī Fō) is a Japanese anime television series. It is loosely based on Kurt Wimmer's 2006 science fiction film Ultraviolet. The series was produced by Sony Pictures Entertainment Japan, animated by Madhouse, and directed by Osamu Dezaki, and was broadcast on Animax from July to September 2008.

An English dub debuted on Crackle in the United States in 2011 and later aired on G4 in 2012.

== Plot ==
In the dystopian future of year 2140, 044 becomes the strongest female soldier excelling in combat through gene manipulation using the Hemophage Virus. However, in exchange for her abilities, her days become numbered. Her next mission from the government is to destroy a bloodthirsty group of people, the Phage, and its leader King. In her battle, she encounters a Phage soldier, Luka, and finds herself unable to kill him. She wonders why, but as a result, Daxus II, the leader of the government group, regards her as a traitor. She is targeted by both Phage and the government, as she flees with the injured Luka.

== Characters ==
044
Voiced by: Romi Park (Japanese); Rebecca Hollcraft (English)
A clone specially engineered as a tool for humans to combat the Phages. At first, she is confused by the unfamiliarity of a life outside being ordered by the Central Government. Eventually, she becomes very contemplative of the fact there exists a world other than her own and escapes. Being a hunter of the Phage and after defying the orders of Daxus II, she becomes targeted by the two powerful forces. After rescuing Luka she is somehow compelled to save him. Later, together with Luka, she returns to Neo Tokyo to combat the Central Government's rule. She dies in the last episode when the building she was in is destroyed.
724
Voiced by: Keiji Fujiwara (Japanese); Mark Oliver (English)
The most elite member of the Central Government's special agents, next to 044. He is also the leader of the SBCU (Special Battle-Clone Unit). Following 044's escape, he is sent by Daxus II to apprehend her. He is a rather cynical clone and hates the fact that 044's abilities had always been valued more his own. After relentlessly pursuing 044 throughout Neo Tokyo, they fight and he is killed.
Daxus II (ダクサス二世, Dakusasu Nisei)
Voiced by: Rikiya Koyama (Japanese); Trevor Devall (English)
The eccentric director of the Central Government who sees himself very highly and often berates his subordinates for their incompetence. He has known 044 since she was a little girl and at first, does not believe she could betray him. Soon after, enraged by her inconsideration of the care he had always administered to her, he ruthlessly tracks and pursues 044 throughout the galaxies. Later, it is revealed by King, that he too is a clone, for his father had contracted the Hemophage Virus and thus could not have sired him. He is killed by King in the last episode.
Garcia (ガルシア, Garushia)
Voiced by: Ken'yu Horiuchi (Japanese); Bryan Drummond (English)
A doctor working for the Central Government as well as the guardian of 044. Giving up his position as a doctor, he accompanies her in her escape from the Central Government suggesting that he cares deeply for 044. He survives the entire way through the series.
King (キング, Kingu)
Voiced by: Michio Hazama (Japanese); French Tickner (English)
The towering, aging leader of the Phage whose head is highly sought by the Central Government. He preaches to his fellow Phages of a world where they too, are not burdened by their disease and are able to live freely. He was one of the pioneers in establishing the Phage society along with Luka's father. He later dies at the hands of Daxus II but not without taking his life as well.
Luka Bloom (ルカ·ブルーム, Ruka Burūmu)
Voiced by: Tomokazu Seki (Japanese); Andrew Francis (English)
The son of a high-ranking member of the Phage society who, following his death, replaces his father as the deputy leader of the Neo Tokyo Phage forum. He is dedicated to fulfilling his father's role and has the utmost respect for King. He fights with and is rescued by 044; eventually he becomes inevitably involved with her. He is shot in the final episode and is thought to be dead until it is revealed that he is alive and will fully recover from his wound.
Matilda (マチルダ, Machiruda)
Voiced by: Kaori Yamagata (Japanese); Nicole Oliver (English)
A kind doctor and a friend of Garcia from medical school. She owns a clinic in Neo Tokyo, which takes care of both human and Phage kind. She helps 044 and Luka by allowing them shelter at her clinic knowing that they were both being pursued by the government. She is with Garcia and Luka in the ending of the final episode on her private island.
Police Inspector Bark (バーク警部, Bāku Keibu)
Voiced by: Yoshito Yasuhara (Japanese); Michael Dobson (English)
An inspector of Neo Tokyo's public safety who is the first to encounter 044 following her escape with Luka. He is someone who is deeply concerned with the pride of his division and thus dies at the hands of the Central Government's elite agents for not complying with their demands.
Sakuza (サクザ)
Voiced by: Akio Ōtsuka (Japanese); Michael Kopsa (English)
Sakuza, also later revealed as clone 6030 is an enigmatic mine foreman in one of many Magnadite mines on the planet named the Coffin of Despair. Though appearing to be a very outgoing man, in the past he was one of the Central Government's forces during Bermuda's war of independence in the year 2122. Outraged by the government's orders which resulted in the vain deaths of his fellow clone soldiers, he single-handedly killed his commanding officers and fled. He is the last of his comrades from this war. He is killed personally by Daxus the second as he was trying to avenge his fallen clone brethren.

== Release ==
Produced by Sony Pictures Entertainment Japan, animated by Madhouse, and directed by Osamu Dezaki, Ultraviolet: Code 044 was broadcast on the satellite television network Animax from July 1 to September 16, 2008. The opening theme song is "Guilty Pleasure and the ending theme is "Falling Down"; both songs were performed by Becca.

An English dub began streaming in the United States on Crackle in April 2011. The series aired on G4 in the US in early 2012 and was later released on DVD by Sony USA on December 4 of that same year. The series was released by Mill Creek Entertainment, along with Kurozuka and Viper's Creed as part of the Anime 3-Series Collection, on June 5, 2018.

=== Episodes ===
No.	Title	Original release date
1	"Setting Off..." "Tabidachi..." (旅立ち...)	July 1, 2008
044 poses as a loyal member of the Phage forum in order to eliminate an upper class member of the society. Her activities are overseen by the eccentric Daxus II, of the Central Government. Though as powerful as she is, 044's lifespan seems to be shortening and as such, begins to wonder about her own existence.
2	"...First Love" "...Hatsukoi" (…初恋)	July 8, 2008
044 is ordered to infiltrate the assembly of Phages in the Neo Tokyo sewer system to find their leader, King. There she finds Luka, a young man who has made a promise to kill her. They fight, however, before 044 can kill him, he chooses his own fate by diving into the sewer. In this encounter something deep within 044 is awakened and thus she rescues Luka, whom she was to kill.
3	"Recovery Directive" "Kaishū Shirei" (回収指令)	July 15, 2008
4	"Chain" "Kusari" (鎖)	July 22, 2008
After escaping into the sewers of Neo Tokyo, 044 is discovered by bounty hunters. She discovers that not only is Daxus II after her, but the Phage, having placed a bounty for her head, are as well. On top of that, she finds the strange need to reconcile with Luka and goes to Matilda's Clinic only to find that things may not be as easy as she thought.
5	"Escape" "Dasshutsu" (脱出)	July 29, 2008
A group of Phages infiltrate Matilda's Clinic and take away Luka. The police along with the SBCU (Special Battle Clone Unit) arrive soon after the Phages. 044 finds out that the leader of the SBCU is 724, another clone that's an elite special agent for Central Government that's second only to her. 044 kills 724, and when Garcia and Matilda are taking her to the spaceship that'll help her escape, Garcia tells 044 that she is "free" now since there's no one and nothing that can monitor her.
6	"Coffin of Despair" "Zetsubō no Hitsugi" (絶望の棺)	August 5, 2008
7	"Clone & Clone" "Kurōn to Kurōn" (クローン&クローン)	August 12, 2008
044 and Garcia discover Sakuza's mysterious past. All the while, 044 is once again made aware of her dwindling lifespan.
8	"Raid" "Rinken" (臨検)	August 19, 2008
Daxus II arrives at the Coffin of Despair and begins operation to root out 044 and Sakuza. However, together with their allies and fellow workers, they put up a resistance against the Central Government forces.
9	"Star Dust" "Sutā Dasuto" (星屑（スター・ダスト）)	August 26, 2008
10	"...Reunion" "...Saikai" (…再会)	September 2, 2008
11	"To Home" "Furusato e..." (地球（ふるさと）へ…)	September 9, 2008
12	"...Flash" "...Senkō" (…閃光)	September 16, 2008
