= C8 (Eastern Europe) =

- Country: Hungary
- Broadcast area: Hungary
- Network: AMC Networks International Central Europe

Programming
- Language(s): Hungarian
- Picture format: 16:9

Ownership
- Owner: AMC Networks International
- Sister channels: AMC; CBS Action; CBS Drama; CBS Reality; Film Mania; Film Cafe; Megamax; Minimax; Sport1; Sport2; Sport M Spektrum; Spektrum Home; TV Paprika

History
- Launched: 1 April 2014 (Hungary); 5 May 2014 (Czech Republic, Slovakia and Romania)
- Replaced: Animax
- Closed: 31 December 2015 (Czech Republic, Slovakia and Romania); 31 December 2017 (Hungary)

C8 was a general entertainment TV channel broadcasting to people in Hungary. The channel launched on 1 April 2014 in Hungary and 5 May 2014 in Czech Republic, Slovakia, Serbia and Romania, replacing Animax. The channel ceased on 30 December 2015 in Czech Republic, Slovakia, Serbia and Romania. On 1 January 2018, C8 was shut down completely and Minimax fled up the overnight spot making Minimax to run 24 hours for the first time.

== Programming schedule ==
C8 Hungary
Time (CET)	Weeknights	Weekends
20:00 (8:00 pm)	For children and youth	
21:00 (9:00 pm)	Film and TV series	Sports
23:00 (11:00 pm)	Documentary, Cookery and Lifestyle	
02:00	End of transmission	

== See also ==
- AMC Networks International
- Minimax
- Animax
