= Time Travel Tondekeman =

1989 Japanese anime series

- Time Travel Tondekeman DVD Cover

たいむとらぶる トンデケマン! (Taimu Toraburu Tondekeman!)
- Genre: Science fiction, Adventure
- Anime television series
- Directed by: Kunihiko Yuyama; Akira Sugino
- Produced by: Hiroshi Katō; Kenji Shimizu; Yūko Katō
- Written by: Junki Takegami
- Music by: Noriyuki Asakura
- Studio: Ashi Productions
- Original network: Fuji TV
- Original run: 19 October 1989 – 26 August 1990
- Episodes: 39

Time Travel Tondekeman (たいむとらぶる トンデケマン!, Taimu Toraburu Tondekeman) is an anime series directed by Kunihiko Yuyama and Akira Sugino. It was written by Junki Takegami and produced by Masao Takiyama.

The story is an episodic, slapstick anime about time travel. Each episode unfolds in the past or future. It sometimes takes place in historical events, but also in movie worlds. The show often parodies famous movies, and the broadcast titles are often puns on movie titles. Except for the final episode, it does not deal with time paradoxes.

It was originally broadcast by Fuji Television in Japan between 19 October 1989 and 26 August 1990. Time Quest, as it was called outside Japan, was first aired in the Philippines in 1994 on IBC. It was reaired on ABC (now TV5) in 2000 and GMA Network in 2015. It also was aired in Indosiar, Indonesia during 1995, and it was rerun in Space Toon Indonesia since the year 2008.

== Story ==
The series starts when Hayato, a soccer enthusiast, and his girlfriend Yumi, an aspiring musician, went to a visit to Dr. Leonard's lab. They accidentally activated the Tondekeman, a funny talking kettle who transported them many centuries in the past.

In Baghdad, Hayato and Yumi gets reunited but they got separated from Tondekeman. They meet Aladdin, Prince Dandarn and Princess Shalala. They also meet the cunning Abdullah who is always ready to kidnap the princess so that he could marry the princess to his master.

Our heroes get to go to different places and times and meet several historical and literary figures as they follow Abdullah as he escapes through time to abduct the princess.

Hayato and Yumi are stuck in the past until they get Tondekeman from the possession of Abdullah.

== Characters ==
Hayato Shindou
Voiced by Yūji Mitsuya
A Soccer enthusiast. He is good at soccer and often kicks the ball to escape the crisis. He wears a headband on his head, a soccer supporter on his wrist, short-sleeved shirt and shorts, and barefoot sneakers. He used to visit Dr. Leonard a lot, because he is strong in machines. His classmate is Yumi from the same school and is quite close. In the 9th century, he was taken care with Yumi of princess Shalala in the palace. In the pre-broadcast material, he was the name "Batto Shindo" taken from Sinbad who appeared in the Thousand and One Nights story. His set age is 14 years of the second year of middle school. However, according to an anime magazine material, he is 11 years old in the 5th grade of elementary school (5-3 is written on the tag at the entrance of the classroom where he came out in the scene where Hayato first appeared in episode 1). His favorite habit is "It's fine".
Yumi Arama
Voiced by Kumiko Nishihara
Hayato's girlfriend and an aspiring musician. She can tell which time it is in the era by using a portable dictionary in the destination of the dimension hole, which is detailed in the history. There are settings that used to be a band in the 20th century, but it is only used in the opening, episode 1, episode 3 and the final episode. Like Hayato, she is strong in machinery. They often drive a scooter they brought with them since the 20th century. Before the broadcast, she was written as "Miko Himana".
Tondekeman
Voiced by Shigeru Chiba
A kettle type time machine made of stainless steel. It wears sunglasses and speaks the Kansai dialect. It is programmed to make the person who holds it the "master", and basically only the master's command can be heard. Even if the master changes, it has a good personality that it will immediately sesame. It can make a "dimensional hole" by emitting a ray from its mouth. The hole closes in 10 minutes. Originally, the designation of time and place was done by dialing the part corresponding to the ear, but in reality, most of the time, it was verbally instructed. Moreover, since there are no instructions or it is rough even if there are instructions, Tondekeman often chooses the destination. The built-in computer seems to be excellent, can talk like a human, and has decrypted it. It was once broken in the 15th episode, but has been repaired safely by the repair of Dr. Edison.
Prince Dandarn
Voiced by Akira Kamiya
The prince of Baghdad and the third son of the Dada family. He is the second one, but he is a big funny man and he looks like he is spoiled. He is desperate for princess Shalala, with the marriage of her. He is courting her, but is treated by the less aggressive princess. He is staying at Shalala's palace.
Princess Shalala
Voiced by Rei Sakuma
The princess of Baghdad, the only daughter of king Shabada of Baghdad, the best beauty in Arabia and a natural funny woman. She is kidnapped by Abdullah every time. Whether she is got used to it or not having a sense of crisis, she seems to enjoy the situation she is in, and often specifies the destination of the dimension hole.
Aladdin
Voiced by Yūko Mita
A thief boy who is less than 10 years old, living in Baghdad and appears in episode 2. He is fond of calling Hayato the "big brother", and has since lived in princess Shalala's palace. He is accompanied by the dragon kid, Doramusko, who appeared in episode 8.
Abdullah
Voiced by Junpei Takiguchi
A sorcerer at the Horrus Empire, self-proclaimed "Mr. Abdullah, the best wizard in Baghdad", short, fat and hairless. Since his power of the bill of the spell attached to his head is used to apply magic, nothing can be done when the bill runs out. The bill is usually hidden in his turban. He has a magic lamp and a flying carpet. He also carries Tondekeman in his belly. Every time, he kidnaps princess Shalala and escapes to another era through the dimensional hole, but he eventually fails and returns. He like lizard tails.
Dr. Leonardo
Voiced by Shigeru Chiba
Inventor of Tondekeman. At the final episode, Dr. Leonardo reveal that he is Leonardo da Vinci.
Genie of the Lamp
Voiced by Shigezou Sasaoka
A giant that emerges from Abdullah's magic lamp. He looks like a Superman and always has a high laugh. He can fly in the sky. He is not very smart, but when he get serious, he is so strong. There are many stupid behaviors, such as misunderstanding Poseidon, the sea god, as his father, and falling in love with the Statue of Liberty at first sight. He like lizard tails. He appears as a newspaper reporter in the final episode.

== Episodes ==
No.	Title	Original release date
1	"Mr. Wolf, it's a kettle" "Okami-san, yakan desu yo" (オカミさん、やかんですよ)	October 19, 1989
2	"Genius comes when you forget" "Tensai wa wasureta koro ni yattekuru" (天才は忘れたころにやってくる)	October 26, 1989
3	"Trojan horse is Trojan" "Toroiya no mokuba wa toroi ya" (トロイヤの木馬はとろいや)	November 2, 1989
4	"Sphinx!" "Sufinkusu tonda!" (スフィンクスとんだ！)	November 9, 1989
5	"The Poseidon Adventure" "Poseidon adobenchaa" (ぽせいどんアドベンチャー)	November 16, 1989
6	"Good luck with the emperor's drink" "Koutei dorinku de gangbarunba" (皇帝ドリンクでがんばるんば)	November 23, 1989
7	"Amazons vs Mr. Lady" "Amazonesu VS misutaa redi" (アマゾネスVSミスター・レディ)	November 30, 1989
8	"Dragon Quest Legend!??" "Doragon kuesuto densetsu!?" (ドラゴン・クエスト伝説！？)	December 7, 1989
9	"Fake tondekeman appears!!!" "Nise tondekeman genwaru!!" (ニセトンデケマン現わる！！)	December 14, 1989
10	"The star of Princess Shalala is born!!!" "Sharara hime no sutaa tanjou!!" (シャララ姫のスター誕生！！)	December 21, 1989
11	"Dandarn Expulsion (Secret) Great Strategy!??" "Dandaan tsuihou (hi) dai sakusen!?" (ダンダーン追放（秘）大作戦！？)	January 11, 1990
12	"Untouchable uproar!!!" "Antacchaburu dai soudou!!" (アンタッチャブル大騒動！！)	January 18, 1990
13	"The big king is a viking!??" "Dekai ousama wa baikingu!?" (でかい王様はバイキング！？)	January 25, 1990
14	"After all the earth is moving" "Yappari chikyuu wa ugoite iru" (やっぱり地球は動いている)	February 1, 1990
15	"Dr. Edison's extraordinary affection" "Ejison hakase no ijou na aijou" (エジソン博士の異常な愛情)	February 8, 1990
16	"Come to Dracula City!" "Dorakyura to e kuru!" (ドラキュラ都へ来る)	February 15, 1990
17	"Back to the Western" "Bakku tu za seibu geki" (バック・トゥ・ザ・西部劇)	February 22, 1990
18	"Holy Sword Legend Excalibur" "Hijiri ken densetsu ekusukaribaa" (聖剣伝説えくすかりばあ)	March 1, 1990
19	"Large eruption! Pompeii escape strategy" "Dai funka! Ponpei dasshutsu sakusen" (大噴火！ポンペイ脱出作戦)	March 8, 1990
20	"What are all the ninjas?" "Ninja wa zenbu de nan ninja?" (忍者は全部でなんにんじゃ？)	March 15, 1990
21	"Napoleon is vulnerable to gals" "Naporeon wa gyaru ni yowai" (ナポレオンはギャルに弱い)	March 22, 1990
22	"300 million years after asking my mother?" "Haha wo tazunete san oku nen?" (母をたずねて三億年？)	March 29, 1990
23	"Burn! Martial arts of fire!!!" "Moeyo! Honoo no kakutougi marason!!" (燃えよ！炎の格闘技！！)	April 13, 1990
24	"(Secret) report! Cleopatra Legend!!!" "(Hi) houkoku! Kureopatora densetsu!!" (㊙報告！クレオパトラ伝説！！)	April 20, 1990
25	"The biggest gray race ever!" "Shijou saidai no gureeto reesu!" (史上最大のグレートレース！)	April 27, 1990
26	"Can't you stop anymore?!! Runaway train" "Mou tomaranai?! Bousou ressha" (もう止まらない？！暴走列車)	May 11, 1990
27	"Lack of oxygen! 2101, A Space Odyssey" "Sanketsu! 2101 nen, uchūnotabi desse" (酸欠！2101年、宇宙の旅でっせ)	May 18, 1990
28	"Detective Holmes' extraordinary adventure" "Tantei hoomuzu no ijou na bouken" (探偵ホームズの異常な冒険)	May 25, 1990
29	"Top Gun Abnormal Battle" "Ganso toppugan ijou na tatakai" (元祖トップガン異常な戦い)	June 1, 1990
30	"Untouchable fuss II" "Antacchaburu dai soudou II" (アンタッチャブル大騒動II)	June 8, 1990
31	"20,000 Leagues Under the Sea! Unusual journey" "Kaitei 2 man mairu! Ijou na tabi" (海底2万マイル！異常な旅)	June 15, 1990
32	"Princess Shalala's Roman Holiday" "Sharara hime no Rooma no kyuujitsu" (シャララ姫のローマの休日)	June 22, 1990
33	"An unusual rose in Versailles?" "Berusaiyu no ijou na bara?" (ベルサイユの異常なバラ？)	July 8, 1990
34	"Explosion! Dandarn Mine Operation" "Bakuhatsu! Dandaan jirai dai sakusen" (爆発！ダンダーン地雷大作戦)	July 15, 1990
35	"Impressed! Home run to the sun!!!" "Kandou! Taiyou e no hoomuran!!" (感動！太陽へのホームラン！！)	July 29, 1990
36	"Very Micro Princess Shalala" "Taihen Mikuro no Sharara hime" (大変ミクロのシャララ姫)	August 5, 1990
37	"Discovered Shalala's love in Venice" "Hakkaku Sharara no Benisu no koi" (発覚シャララのベニスの恋)	August 12, 1990
38	"Big explosion! Last trip" "Dai bakuhatsu! Saigo no jikan ryokou" (大爆発！最後のじかん旅行)	August 19, 1990
39	"Crosstalk! The last day of the earth!??" "Dai konsen! Chikyuu saigo no hi!?" (大混線！地球最後の日！？)	August 26, 1990

== Soundtrack ==
Opening theme

- Yume mireba Time Machine sung by Jag-Toy

Closing theme

- Tomodachi ni Modorenai sung by Jag-Toy (1-23)
- Soba ni Iru ne sung by Ribbon (24-39)
