= Viper's Creed =

Japanese anime television series

- Title card
- ヴァイパーズ・クリード
- Created by: Sony Pictures Entertainment Japan; AIC Spirits; Digital Frontier
- Written by: Masanao Akahoshi
- Directed by: Shinji Aramaki (Chief); Hiroyuki Kanbe
- Music by: Tetsuya Takahashi; Naoyuki Horiuchi; Rinka; Shōgo Ōnishi
- No. of episodes: 12 (list of episodes)

Production
- Producers: Tooru Miura; Hidenori Ueki
- Animators: AIC Spirits; Digital Frontier
- Production company: Sony Pictures Entertainment Japan

Original release
- Network: Animax, BS11
- Release: January 6 – March 24, 2009

Viper's Creed (ヴァイパーズ・クリード, Vaipāzu Kurīdo) is a Japanese mecha action anime series created by Sony Pictures Entertainment Japan with animation by AIC Spirits and Digital Frontier. Though Hiroyuki Kanbe is the main director of the show, Shinji Aramaki is solely responsible for the creation and conception of the show. G4 aired the show in the United States, but later pulled it from the schedule after only four episodes.

== Plot ==
With most of the Earth's cities underwater due to the onset of global warming followed by a third world war which brought calamity and turmoil to the people, various PMCs are one of the few remaining organizations able to provide law enforcement and self-defense protection for cities that are trying to rebuild again from the war and the floods. One of the PMCs providing law enforcement is the Arqon Global Security corporation, responsible for protecting Fort Daiva City from terrorism, armed crimes, and renegade unmanned machines called Bug Mechs, by deploying its elite military unit called Viper^{Ep 02} led by its operatives called Blademen.^{Ep 01}

== Cast ==
Viper's Creed major cast
Role	Japanese	English
Lead roles
Rudra Schenkel	Shinji Kawada	Brendan Hunter
Sakurako Kariya	Megumi Toyoguchi	Carol-Anne Day
Saiki Creed	Takaya Kuroda	Jonathan Love
Norma Nguyen	Junko Minagawa	Meredith Taylor-Parry
Gharib Svarogue	Mitsuaki Hoshino	Michael Dobson
Haruki Oguma	Jun Fukuyama	Scott Roberts
Recurring roles
Telesia Strauss	Yuki Kaida	Onalea Gilbertson
UIla Chiaki	Takahiro Sakurai	Frank Zotter
Walter Henderson	Hiroshi Yanaka	Don Brown
Fuyuhuko Oguma	Tamio Ooki	Paul Cowling
Ageha	Nana Akiyama	Leda Davies
Kelly Treag	Rina Satou	Melanie Ridson
Chris Ladd	Kana Ueda	Laura Rushfeldt
Sabrina Canudd	Hina Sakurai	Angie Beers
Zaliche	Shunsuke Sakuya	Noah Umholtz
Jill Merneau	Sachiko Kojima	Emily Bachynski
Doc	Kinryuu Arimoto	Doug DeNance
Gilles	Dai Matsumoto	Mike Shepherd
Utsugi	Kazuki Yao	Doug McKeag
Jimmy	Tetsuhara Oota	Adam Hunter
Maika	Sachiko Kojima	April Banigan

== Mecha ==
=== Maneuver Blades ===
Maneuver Blades are humanoid mecha employed by Blademen, possessing the remarkable ability to transform into motorcycles. These mecha are equipped with essential weaponry, including an assault rifle, a rocket launcher on each shoulder, and a left shoulder-mounted missile pod consisting of six tubes. While in motorcycle form they can easily reach speeds over 80 kilometers an hour. Most maneuver blades are equipped with a secondary weapon depending on the combat tactics of the pilot including a grenade launcher attachment to the assault rifle, heat chainsaw, a gatling gun, or a sniper rifle. The head of the mecha also serves as cameras with highly detailed targeting scanners.

=== Bug Mechs ===
Bug Mechs are unmanned mecha based on insects that were used as autonomous war machines during the great war. However, due to their AI they became unable to differentiate between friend and foe and became very difficult to be reprogrammed. The bug mechs are usually armed with gatling guns and homing mines called Spider Mines or "Ticker Bombs" in which they use their spider-like legs to attach to enemies before exploding. As demonstrated in episodes 2 and 11, bug mechs are very versatile and can easily move around in dark and underground environments. Five types of bug mechs were used during the events of the series and with the exception of the sputnik every bug mech returns in the final episode by the military.

- Mega Soma: Armed with twin gatling guns, ticker bombs, spider mines, and spear legs.
- Gelus: Armed with twin gatling guns.
- Sputnik: Armed with twin gatling guns and spear legs.
- Acromantis: Armed with scythe arms, a gatling gun, and spider mines.
- Mobilius: Armed with spider mines, back missile pod, a left arm machine gun, and a right arm claw.

== Production ==
News of Viper's Creed went on the internet when screenplay writer Ai Ōta announced on her official blog that Shinji Aramaki would be involved in the creation of the series. An announcement was then circulated on November 11, 2008, that Hiroyuki Kanbe would direct the series with Shinji Aramaki being named as the main chief director. The roles of Saiki Cryde and Kariya Sakurako were given to voice actors Takaya Kuroda and Megumi Toyoguchi, respectively.

A special advance screening was shown on Animax on December 30, 2008. Viper's Creed was subsequently broadcast on Animax and BS11 channels, the former being the first to air it on January 6, 2009, at 10:00 PM before BS11 aired it on its channel on January 10, 2009, at 11:30 PM. The opening song is called R.O.C.K. by iLL with a CD single released on January 28, 2009 while the ending song Ai no Oto is sung in English by moumoon. It was released as a CD single and as a CD single with a DVD on February 25, 2009.

An official podcast webpage dedicated to Viper's Creed was subsequently established.

Zee Cafe India airs the show in India on March 21, 2023.

== Media ==
=== DVD ===
Region 2 DVDs of Viper's Creed have been released in Japan with 3 episodes each. As of October 2009, Volume 1 was released on August 5, 2009 with Volume 2 released on September 2, 2009. Volume 3 was released on October 7, 2009.

In 2018, Mill Creek Entertainment released the complete series in Region 1 as part of their Anime 3-Series Collection along with Kurozuka and Ultraviolet: Code 044.
