= JimJam =

Preschool television channel

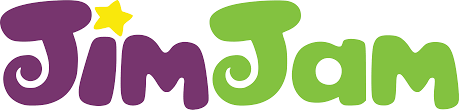
- Country: United Kingdom; Italy
- Broadcast area: Europe; Africa; Southeast Asia (previously)

Programming
- Languages: English; Czech; Hungarian; Polish (as Polsat JimJam); Romanian; Russian; Arabic; Italian (formerly); Portuguese; Turkish (formerly); Hebrew (formerly); Lithuanian; Dutch (formerly); German (formerly)
- Timeshift service: JimJam +1 (closed in Italy)

Ownership
- Owner: AMC Networks International
- Sister channels: AMC; Film Cafe; CBS Reality; Extreme Sports Channel; HorrorXtra; Legend; RealityXtra; Minimax

History
- Launched: 1 October 2006; 20 years ago (Italy); 3 December 2007 (Hungary, Poland (as Polsat JimJam), Czech Republic & Slovakia); 1 January 2008; 18 years ago (Moldova & Romania); 1 April 2008; 18 years ago (The Netherlands); 14 April 2008; 18 years ago (MENA); 1 July 2008; 18 years ago (Bulgaria, Russia & CIS Nations); 15 August 2008; 18 years ago (Malta); 1 November 2008; 18 years ago (Southeast Asia); 28 November 2008; 17 years ago (Portugal); January 2010 (Israel); 27 April 2012; 14 years ago (Sub-Saharan Africa); 29 August 2012; 14 years ago (Lithuania)
- Replaced: Cartoon Network (Israel)
- Closed: 9 December 2014 (Asia); 30 June 2015; 11 years ago (Italy); 31 December 2017 (Switzerland); 1 March 2018; 8 years ago (Netherlands); 10 March 2022; 4 years ago (Bulgaria, Russia & CIS Nations); 1 July 2022; 4 years ago (Portugal)

Links
- Website: www.pe.jimjam.tv

Availability

Terrestrial
- Skylink (Czech Republic and Slovakia): Channel 28
- StarTimes (Sub-Saharan Africa): Channel 303
- DStv (Sub-Saharan Africa): Channel 310 (English); Channel 641 (Portuguese)
- GOtv (Sub-Saharan Africa): Channel 80
- Polsat Box as Polsat JimJam: Channel 87
- Zuku TV (East Africa): Channel 620

JimJam is an international children's preschool television channel operated by AMC Networks International Central and Northern Europe, which originally launched in Italy on Sky in 2006. It is currently available across Europe and Africa.

== History ==
JimJam was launched on 1 October 2006. In September 2007, HIT Entertainment and Chellomedia (European content division of Liberty Global, currently AMC Networks International) formed a joint venture to run a children's channel. The channel was advertised as international, with plans to start cable and satellite broadcast in Western and Eastern Europe and then expand broadcasting worldwide (outside the UK, Ireland, US and Canada).

The channel was expanded to Central and Eastern Europe in November 2007 on UPC Broadband. By March 2008, JimJam launched in the Netherlands and Switzerland, and continued expansion through MENA on Showtime Arabia and Russia and Bulgaria in July. In November 2008, it launched in Southeast Asia. On 28 November 2008, it launched in Portugal. In January 2010, the channel launched in Israel on Yes, and in 2012, Hot launched the Russian-language version in the country. By 2010, the channel had been broadcast in over 50 territories in Europe, the Middle East and Asia. In August 2010, HIT Entertainment withdrew from the JimJam joint venture, leaving JimJam wholly owned by Chello Zone. HIT Entertainment was supposed to keep providing content for JimJam. By 2013, JimJam was available to an audience of 17 million subscribers in 13 languages. The channel has been broadcast in over 60 territories in Europe, the Middle East, East Asia and Africa, with seven feeds and four localized versions.

In Poland, AMC Networks International and Polsat Group formed a joint-venture in 2009 and progressively replaced JimJam by Polsat JimJam across providers in the country, which used to have the same schedule until it progressively became localized. The channel broadcasts the same lineup of programming as other international versions of JimJam, but Polsat JimJam broadcasts according to local time. It also carries Polish commercials and also has Polish audio and subtitles. On 13 February 2023, Polsat sold its shares in Polsat JimJam Limited to AMCNI. Stanisław Janowski, President of Polsat's management board, explained the decision by the wear and tear of the formula. The channel, however, continues to operate under the name Polsat JimJam and the Polsat Media office is still responsible for advertising sales.

It expanded to Africa in April 2012 in English and in November 2012 in Portuguese. On 1 August 2016, it relaunched across the MENA region as a BeIN exclusive.

In the Philippines, JimJam was launched on SkyCable on 6 March 2013.

JimJam closed in Asia-Pacific on 9 December 2014, Italy on 30 June 2015, in Switzerland and Austria on 31 December 2017, Belgium and the Netherlands on 1 March 2018, in the CIS Nations on 10 March 2022, and in Portugal on 1 July 2022. However, the Portuguese language feed is still available for Angola and Mozambique on DStv which also have the English language channel.

The channel was launched in Lithuania on 29 August 2012.

In 2018, JimJam was rebranded with a new logo and three mascots, Jim, Jam and Star.

A dedicated Hungarian version was launched on 1 January 2020.

A dedicated Romanian version was launched on 1 March 2020.

== See also ==
- Minimax
- Canal Panda
- Polsat JimJam
- CBeebies
