= Minimax (TV channel) =

Central European children's television channel

- Logo used since 2021
- Country: Hungary
- Broadcast area: Hungary; Czech Republic; Slovakia; Romania; Moldova; Serbia; Croatia; Bosnia and Herzegovina; Montenegro; Slovenia; Spain (1 January 1994 — 4 December 1998); Poland (16 April 1999 — 16 October 2004)
- Headquarters: AMC Networks International Central Europe, Budapest, Hungary

Programming
- Languages: Hungarian; Czech; Romanian; Serbian; Slovene
- Picture format: 16:9/4:3 576i HDTV

Ownership
- Owner: Sogecable/Canal+ (1994–2003); Fox Family Worldwide Inc. (1998); Cabeltechnologie (1999–2003); Mediatech Hungary (1999–2007); AMC Networks International Central Europe (2007–present)
- Sister channels: JimJam

History
- Launched: 1 January 1994 (Spain); 16 April 1999 (Poland); 6 December 1999 (Hungary); 1 June 2001 (Romania and Moldova); 23 December 2003 (Czech Republic and Slovakia); 17 June 2007 (Serbia, Bosnia and Herzegovina, Croatia, Montenegro and North Macedonia); 22 November 2011 (Slovenia)
- Replaced: Supermax (Czech Republic)
- Closed: 4 December 1998 (Spain); 16 October 2004 (Poland)
- Replaced by: Fox Kids (Spain); ZigZap (Poland)

Links
- Website: (See #External links)

Minimax is a European pay television channel aimed at children, headquartered in Hungary, and broadcasting to 11 Central and Eastern European countries. The channel was also broadcast in Spain from 1994 to 1998 and Poland from 1999 to 2004. Minimax's policy goals include edutainment and non-violent programs.

As of 2018, the channel runs 24 hours a day. Previously, from 1995 though 2017, Minimax timeshared with Sportmanía, Musicmax, Game One, ITV Hungary, M+, Cool, Animax that used to broadcast more mature and violent cartoons, including anime and C8 over the years.

As the channel broadcasts in multiple countries in multiple languages with the same schedule (except commercial advertisements), program trailers and other presentation elements did not feature written information between 2004 to 2021; however, they started being rolled out again.

Although most of its foreign show broadcasting is in the language it usually broadcasts in, the on-screen text are kept in their original language.

== History ==
Minimax has its origins in Spain, where it was launched on 1 January 1994 as part of a 4-channel Sogecable package on Canal Satélite, broadcasting on the Astra 1C satellite for 13 hours a day, from 8am to 9pm. In 1994, Canal+ expressed its intentions to launch the channel across Europe and even to offer the Canal Satélite package to Latin American viewers. In 1995, the channel Sportmanía launched and began timesharing with Minimax. In 1996, Minimax reached a deal with Nickelodeon to broadcast the latter's shows on weekends. In May 1998, Minimax began broadcasting series from Fox Kids, initially as a three-hour block. However, by November 1998, Fox had purchased Minimax's broadcasts entirely and it was replaced by the Spanish version of Fox Kids on 4 December of that year. However, Minimax programming continued to be shown in the mornings for preschool audiences.

The current Central European iteration of Minimax began on 16 April 1999 when the Polish version of the network was launched nationally on Cyfra+. A version of Minimax was launched in Hungary on 6 December 1999, to coincide with the Christmas season. At launch, the channel aired only between 18:00-20:00 CET. Until 3 March 2000, it gradually extended its broadcast hours, and from that date onwards, the channel aired between 06:00-20:00 CET until 31 December 2017. This new version of Minimax focused on European-produced programming, some of it from the socialist era. Local programmes included Bob a Bobek – králíci z klobouku and Hungarian Folk Tales. The regional flavour and its unique commitment to non-violent programming, caused the channel to surge in popularity in Hungary.

On 2 May 2000, a regional version of the French television channel Game One (originally planned as Game Channel) began timesharing with Minimax, broadcasting between 20:00-22:00 CET. On 15 May 2001, Minimax began its test transmissions in Romania and Moldova, until the channel was fully launched in 1 June to coincide with Children's Day. On 27 August 2001, ITV Hungary took over Game One's time space.

In 2003, the Hungarian company Mediatech Media gained full control of the Minimax brand, previously having co-owned it with the original owners Groupe Canal+ and Cabeltechnologie. On 9 February 2003, ITV Hungary closed down. On 15 September 2003, M+ was launched, taking over the nightly slot. M+ was provided only smaller cable companies. Although most cable companies turned off the signal after Minimax signed off, UPC and UPC Direct after Minimax signed off instead aired the "Minimax for UPC" channel which broadcast programs from the now-defunct music channel Musicmax which was aired same channel space as Game One/ITV/M+ and Minimax.

In October 2003, the Action+ programming strand was announced to be timesharing with Minimax on the Cinemagia website, and later in the year, Action+ was launched in Romania, broadcasting from 19:30 to 1:30.

On 23 December 2003, the Hungarian feed of Minimax started broadcasting in Czech when a test transmission occurred in the Czech Republic and Slovakia, and on 1 January 2004, a fully localised Czech feed (though sharing with the Hungarian feed) was launched in those countries, taking over the channel space of the defunct TV channel Supermax on some providers, while the Supermax channel still aired on a few providers until 15 September 2004.

On 4 September 2004, M+ merged with Humor 1 and renamed as Cool. When it was still called M+, it has operated independently from Minimax since 6 December 2003.

In Poland, Minimax's programming was becoming starkly divided between content for preschoolers and content for teenagers (akin to the American channel Noggin). Because of this, there were two main blocks - MiniKaruzela (premiered on 24 December 2000) for preschoolers and MaxiStrefa (premiered in January 2002), showing sitcoms and cartoons for older audiences. MiniKaruzela was spun off into MiniMini+ (named after Minimax) on 20 December 2003, however MiniKaruzela broadcast until 10 April 2004, Minimax was replaced by ZigZap on 16 October 2004, which is now known as Teletoon+. The channel still retains a focus on pre-teens and teens. Despite Minimax not having existed in Poland for a long time, MiniMini+ has still retained its name.

On 4 December 2004 in Hungary, Romania, Slovakia and the Czech Republic, A+ Anime began timesharing with Minimax, replacing Cool. In Hungary only on the UPC Direct platform the lesser-known music channel called A+ Music was aired on the same channel space as A+ and Minimax. On 6 September 2006, Sony Pictures Television International acquired A+ and later relaunched it as Animax on 2 July 2007.

In June 2007, Chellomedia (now AMC Networks International) acquired Minimax from Mediatech Media. Later that year, the channel launched in the former Yugoslavia (except Slovenia), where it operates in the Serbian language.

Between 29 October and 22 November 2009, the Slovak-language operations of Minimax were replaced with Czech-language ones.

On 22 November 2011, the channel launched in Slovenia.

Animax broadcast for the last time in the region on 31 March 2014, and was relaunched as C8 on 1 April 2014 in Hungary and 5 May 2014 in Romania, the Czech Republic, and Slovakia. On 30 and 31 December 2015, C8 closed down in the Czech Republic and Romania. Since then, Minimax has been 24/7 in those countries.

On 5 October 2017, AMC announced that Minimax would go 24/7 in Hungary. In December 2017, it was announced that Minimax would operate for 24 hours per day in Serbia by New Year's Eve. On 31 December 2017 and 1 January 2018, C8 closed down completely and Minimax filled up the overnight slot, leading the Hungarian version to broadcast 24/7.

Near the end of 2019, it was announced that Minimax, as well all AMC-owned channels, would be removed from DIGI. However, on 31 December 2019, executives made a last minute decision to continue broadcasting the channels.

== Visual identity ==
For the first year of the channel's existence, its logo was a black oval with the words "Mini Max" written in an abstract black and yellow font, often upon a dark turquoise background.

In January 1995, the Minimax channel was rebranded, with the logo design which is still used to this day. The Spanish graphic design agency Ostra Delta designed a new package of logo and idents consisting of a blue ring with an orange centre with the channel's multiple (normally 6) animated human mascots doing various things, which would rapidly draw itself into the channel name Minimax flashing in white wavy different fonts, however, the colours could vary. This was also accompanied by a jingle (normally extended into a song), which still used to this day.

Upon the channel's relaunch on 16 April 1999, the idents were kept and new versions were commissioned. At night, a testcard would play (with the Minimax theme) telling the viewers to resume watching in the morning.

On 1 July 2004, the original of logo and idents were changed to an orange ring with a transparent centre and white text. However, until 20 February 2006, the logo and idents, bumpers were in a transition, and still featured the original mascots and the 2 color of version for the blue and the orange version of the logo appearing in a hurry but hastily shrinking from the screen on top. All written information was removed from the logo and idents from screens at this time as well, and replaced with audio announcements to better facilitate the channel's multilingual broadcasts. The signoff ident depicted a starry sky while an announcer wished the viewers goodnight.

On 20 February 2006, the original package image of logo, idents, bumpers and 4 mascot characters was fully replaced after 11 years. This time, the new package was designed by the Hungarian agencies Studio Baestarts and KGB Studios. The original six mascots were replaced with new characters with partially 2D-animated but slightly 3D styled ones, a girl named Mini, a boy named Max, and an anthropomorphic cat and dog respectively named Picicica, meaning "small cat" in Hungarian (Kočka Micka in Czech Republic and Slovakia), and Macikutya, meaning "bear-dog" (Cuțulache in Romania, Bumbrlíček in Czech Republic and Slovakia). The mascots do not speak any dialogue, like the channel's idents and information boards. They also feature in a similarly dialogue-less series of animated PSA shorts called MiniKRESZ, animated by Studio Baestarts. In 2009, live-action versions of Mini and Max starred in the Minimax original show, MiniChef.

In 2015, the closedown was truncated to just Mini and Max leaving, putting the pets Picicica and Macikutya to sleep, who come out the Minimax Other logo and idents would play as the next station opened.

On 23 March 2013, the new logo and idents received a new fully 3D CGI rework which also switched to 16:9 image format the 2006 mascots being reanimated.

On 1 July 2021, the Hungarian feed altered its presentation again, with a new rebranding designed by Bulgarian agency ROBO LAB. Mini and Max were dropped after 15 years while Picicica and Macikutya had updated designs, however, they only appear on the channel's websites now, not on air. The Minimax Channel feeds rolled out across the board on 1 August. These logos and idents introduced written information on start and end cards for commercial breaks, and for programme promotion.

== Announcers ==
- Balázs Láng (Hungarian) (1999–2008)
- Attila Dolmány (Hungarian) (2008–2010)
- Gábor Csőre (Hungarian) (2010–present)
- Libor Terš (Czech)
- Marius Săvescu (Romanian) (2001–2008)
- Unknown announcer (Romanian) (2008-2010)
- Alexandru Rusu (Romanian) (2010–present)
- Srđan Merković (Serbian) (2007-present)
- Unknown announcer, but to be announced soon (Slovenian) (2011-present)

== International channels ==
Availability of Minimax by country: Available, localised feed; Available, other country's feed; Defunct

=== Current channels ===
Launch date	Country
6 December 1999	Hungary
1 June 2001	Romania; Moldova
23 December 2003	Czech Republic; Slovakia
17 June 2007	Serbia; Croatia; Bosnia and Herzegovina; Montenegro; North Macedonia
22 November 2011	Slovenia

=== Defunct channels ===
Active date	Country	Replacement
1 January 1994–15 November 1998	Spain	Fox Kids / Jetix
16 April 1999–16 October 2004	Poland	ZigZap

== See also ==
- JimJam
