= Sony Pictures Entertainment Japan =

Japanese branch of Sony Pictures

Sony Pictures Entertainment (Japan) Inc.

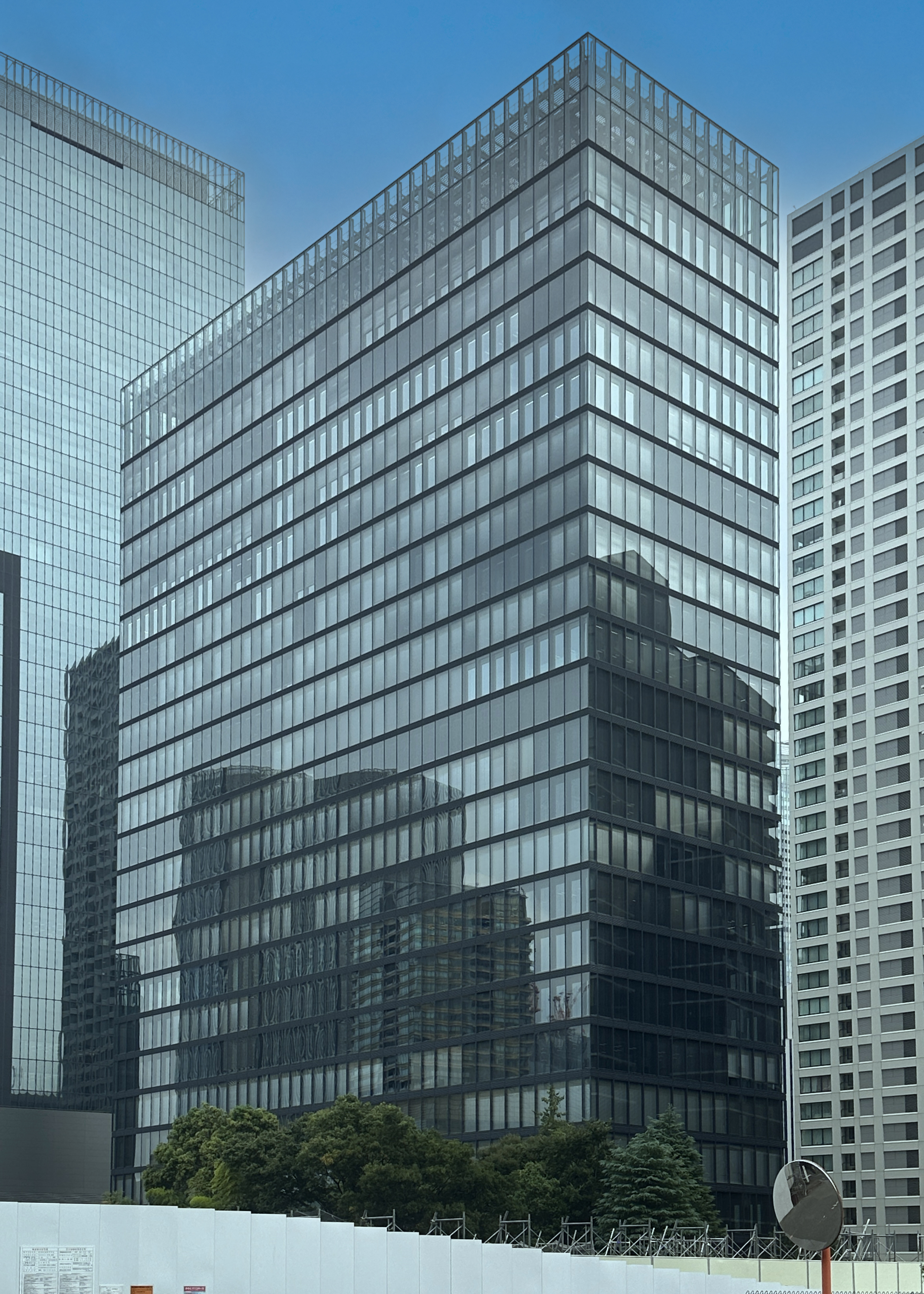
- Headquarters in Toranomon, Minato, Tokyo
- Native name: 株式会社ソニー・ピクチャーズ エンタテインメント
- Romanized name: Kabushiki gaisha Sonī Pikuchāzu Entateinmento
- Formerly: RCA Columbia Pictures Video Co., Ltd. (1984–1991)
- Type: Joint venture
- Industry: Entertainment; Film
- Founded: February 10, 1984; 42 years ago
- Headquarters: Toranomon, Minato, Japan
- Key people: Daisuke Kadoya (company representative and managing director SVP of International Productions)
- Products: Motion pictures Television programs Anime
- Owner: Sony Pictures Entertainment (62.1%); Sony Group Corporation (33.3%); CPE Holdings Inc. (4.6％)
- Number of employees: 75 (as of July 1, 2026)
- Website: www.sonypictures.jp

Sony Pictures Entertainment (Japan) Inc. (Japanese: 株式会社ソニー・ピクチャーズ エンタテインメント, Hepburn: Kabushiki gaisha Sonī Pikuchāzu Entateinmento; abbreviated SPE or SPEJ), is a Japanese entertainment and film studio, based in Minato-ku, Tokyo. It is a wholly owned subsidiary of Japanese conglomerate Sony Group Corporation, with the majority of SPEJ's shares held by Sony Pictures Entertainment.

Originally founded in 1984 as RCA Columbia Pictures Video Inc. (アール・シー・エー・コロンビア・ピクチャーズ・ビデオ株式会社, Āru Shī Ē Koronbia Pikuchāzu Bideo Kabushiki-gaisha), the Japanese division of RCA Columbia Pictures International Video, the company took on its current name in 1991 after Columbia Tri-Star Films (Japan) Ltd. (コロムビア トライ・スター映画会社, Koromubia Torai-Sutā Eiga Kaisha), the Japanese division of Columbia TriStar Film Distributors International, and Japan International Enterprises Inc. (日本国際エンタープライズ株式会社, Nihon Kokusai Entāpuraizu Kabushiki-gaisha), a Japanese Screen Gems subsidiary formed in 1960, were merged into it. SPEJ became a Sony Music Entertainment Japan subsidiary in March 1994, then SMEJ sold 50% of its shares to Sony Corporation on January 10, 1997 and then SPEJ was split between the American Sony Pictures Entertainment (70%) and Sony Corporation (30%) in April 1998.

They have also distributed most of Sony Pictures films for Japan, as well as producing some anime and anime films as well.

In 2019, Sony Japan merged its music subsidiary Aniplex with its television subsidiary Funimation. In 2021, through Funimation, Sony Pictures bought Crunchyroll from AT&T's WarnerMedia. On March 22, 2024, Sony Pictures Entertainment Japan made an agreement to outsource its home media distribution operations to Happinet through its Media Marketing unit.

== Anime production ==
- Astro Boy (2003–2004)
- Tokyo Godfathers (2003)
- Paprika (2006)
- Ultraviolet: Code 044 (2008)
- Kurozuka (2008)
- Viper's Creed (2009)
- Marvel Anime (2010–2011)
- Iron Man: Rise of Technovore (2013)
- Avengers Confidential: Black Widow & Punisher (2014)
- The Disastrous Life of Saiki K. (2016)
- Goblin Slayer (2018–2023)
- The Violence Action (2022)
- Scarlet (2025) (co-distributed by Toho)
