= AMC Networks International Central and Northern Europe =

Budapest, Hungary-based television company

AMC Networks International Central and Northern Europe (formerly Chello Central Europe) is a Budapest, Hungary-based television company, owned by AMC Networks International.

It operates 30 channels in Albania, Bosnia and Herzegovina, Bulgaria, Croatia, Czech Republic, Estonia, Germany, Hungary, Kosovo, Latvia, Lithuania, Montenegro, Poland, Romania, Serbia, Slovakia, Slovenia and Ukraine.

== Channels ==
- AMC (Hungary, Czech Republic, Slovakia, Slovenia, Romania, Bulgaria, Serbia, Croatia, Ukraine)
- Film Mania (Hungary, Romania)
- Film Cafe (Hungary, Romania)
- Film+ (Czech Republic, Slovakia)
- JimJam
- Kinowelt TV (Germany)
- Minimax (Hungary, Czech Republic, Slovakia, Romania, Moldova, Serbia, Slovenia)
- Sport 1 (Hungary, Czech Republic, Slovakia)
- Sport 2 (Hungary, Czech Republic, Slovakia)
- Spektrum (Hungary, Czech Republic, Slovakia)
- Spektrum Home (Hungary, Czech Republic, Slovakia)
- TV Paprika (Hungary, Czech Republic, Slovakia, Romania)
- Sundance TV (Slovenia, Croatia, Serbia, Bosnia and Herzegovina, Montenegro, Bulgaria, Greece, Cyprus, Malta, Poland)

=== Former channels ===
- C8 (Hungary, Czech Republic, Slovakia, Romania)
- Megamax (Hungary, Czech Republic, Slovakia, Romania)
- Sport M (Hungary)

== Logos ==
Logo of AMC Networks International
