= TV Paprika =

- Country: Hungary; Czech Republic; Slovakia; Romania; Moldova; Serbia; Croatia; Bulgaria

Ownership
- Owner: AMC Networks International Central Europe

History
- Launched: November 2, 2004; 22 years ago

Links
- Website: www.tvpaprika.hu www.tvpaprika.ro

TV Paprika is a Hungarian television channel operated by AMC Networks International Central Europe. Its name is a pun on how peppers for making stuffed peppers are often labelled at markets, short for "tölteni való paprika" which means "peppers to fill".

The channel is aimed at urban viewers aged 18-59 who are open to new things but also have high expectations of quality. The programmes focus mainly on the gastronomic world of Hungary and Central Europe, not only in terms of food but also in terms of quality or speciality drinks, with a strong emphasis on Hungarian wine.
