= Action Channel =

Japanese television channel

- Country: Japan
- Broadcast area: Nationwide
- Headquarters: Tokyo, Japan

Programming
- Languages: Japanese (dubbing; main); English (via SAP) (subtitles in Japanese)
- Picture format: HDTV 1080i

Ownership
- Owner: Nojima Corporation
- Sister channels: Mystery Channel

History
- Launched: 1 June 1998; 28 years ago

Links
- Website: www.axn.co.jp

Action Channel (アクションチャンネル, Akushonchan'neru) is a Japanese pay television channel owned and operated by Nojima Corporation. Until Sony unloaded its linear TV channels, it was the Japanese version of AXN. The channel specializes in action and drama series, mostly from Europe and North America.

== History ==
The Japanese feed of AXN started broadcasting on 1 June 1998, owned by Sony Pictures Television Japan; its launch came shortly after Animax. In July 2003, Sony Pictures Television International sold a 35% equity stake to Jupiter Communications, a Japanese MSO cable operator. Subsequently, the cable company's affiliate sales team would be in charge of affiliate advertising to cable companies. Under SPTI, the channel had the Japanese rights to the Emmy Awards.

Nojima took over AXN from SPTI on 1 October 2021. On 1 October 2023, the AXN logo was dropped and the channel was renamed Action Channel. With the rename came a dog mascot; it gained the name Acty in April 2024 after a viewer poll.
