= List of music video television channels =

Here is a partial list of television channels that have aired music videos:

- 2TV
- 4Fun TV
- 4Fun Dance
- 4fun Fit&Dance (defunct)
- 4fun Hits (defunct)
- 4fun Gold Hits/4fun Gold (defunct)
- 4Music (defunct)
- 40 TV
- 100% NL TV
- ALT TV
- Astro Hitz
- Atomic TV
- Atomic TV (Polish TV channel) (defunct)
- Aux
- AKA
- Berbère Music
- BET
- BET Hip-Hop
- BET Jams
- BET Soul
- Bindass
- Box Hits (defunct)
- Box Upfront (defunct)
- Bubble Hits (defunct)
- Eska Best Music TV (Polish internet TV channel) (defunct)
- Baby Time by Bridge (Russian TV channel)
- Bridge TV (Russian TV channel)
- Bridge TV Deluxe (Russian TV channel)
- Bridge TV Hits (Russian TV channel)
- Bridge TV Classic (Russian TV channel)
- Bridge TV Rock (Russian TV channel)
- Bridge TV Русский хит (Russian TV channel)
- Bridge TV Шлягер (Russian TV channel)
- Bridge TV Этно (Russian TV channel)
- Bridge TV Фрэш (Russian TV channel)
- bpm:tv
- C4
- Cable Music Channel
- Channel O
- Channel V (defunct)
- Channel V Australia (defunct)
- Clubland TV
- Capital TV (defunct)
- Chilled TV (defunct)
- CMC-TV
- CMT (Australian TV channel)
- Country Music Television
- Croatian Music Channel
- CStar
- Deluxe Music
- Deluxe Rap
- Deluxe Rock (defunct)
- Deluxe Flashback (defunct)
- Deluxe Lounge
- Deluxe Dance by Kontor TV
- D17 (French TV channel)
- Disco Polo Music
- Dange TV (Russian TV channel) (defunct)
- EBS Musika
- E4 Extra
- Eska TV
- Eska Party TV (Polish internet TV channel) (defunct)
- Eska Rock TV
- Eska TV Extra
- Europe 2 Pop TV
- Europe 2 TV (defunct)
- Fly Music
- Foxtel Smooth
- Fuse
- Free TV
- Gaan Bangla
- Gemini Music
- Gospel Music Channel
- Great American Country
- Go TV
- GTV (formerly)
- Greatest Hits (defunct)
- Hayat Music
- Heartland
- Heart TV (defunct)
- Heat (defunct)
- Hip Hop TV (Polish TV channel) (defunct)
- International Music Feed
- JUCE TV
- Juice TV
- Jukebox TV (German TV channel)
- Kerrang! TV (defunct)
- Kiss TV (defunct)
- Kiss TV (Romania)
- Mooz Dance (Romanian TV channel)
- Mooz Hits (Romanian TV channel)
- Music Channel (Romanian TV channel)
- M6 Music
- M6 Music Rock (defunct)
- M6 Music Black (defunct)
- M6 Music Club (defunct)
- Magic (defunct)
- Max
- MAD TV
- Massive R&B (defunct)
- MBC Loud FM
- MBC M
- MBC4
- MBC Max
- MBC+ Variety
- MBC Persia
- Mezzo
- MCM
- MCM TOP
- MCM POP
- Melody Hits
- Melody Tunes
- Mazazikh TV
- Mnet
- MTV
- MTV2
- MTV (Polish TV channel)
- MTV (German TV channel)
- MTV (Brazilian TV channel) (defunct)
- MTV (France TV channel)
- MTV (Russian TV channel) (defunct)
- MTV (Asian TV channel) (defunct)
- MTV 2 Pop (German TV channel) (defunct)
- MTV Brand New (German TV channel) (defunct)
- MTV Two (UK & ireland TV channel) (defunct)
- MTV Europe
- MTV Beats (defunct)
- MTV Pulse (French TV channel) (defunct)
- MTV idol (French TV channel) (defunct)
- MTV Base (French TV channel) (defunct)
- Club MTV (defunct)
- MTV Hits (defunct)
- MTV Rocks (defunct)
- MTV OMG (defunct)
- MTV Music (defunct)
- MTV Dance (defunct)
- MTV Live (America)
- MTV Live (International) (defunct)
- MTV 80s (defunct)
- MTV 90s (defunct)
- MTV 00s (defunct)
- MTV Tres
- MTV Pulse (italian TV channel) (defunct)
- MTV Gold (italian TV channel) (defunct)
- MTV Music (italian TV channel)
- MTV Brand New (italian TV channel) (defunct)
- MTV Hits (italian TV channel) (defunct)
- MTV Classic (italian TV channel) (defunct)
- MTV+ (italian TV channel) (defunct)
- MTV Classic
- MTV Classic UK (defunct)
- MTV Shows (UK & ireland TV channel) (defunct)
- MTVU
- MuchMore
- MuchMusic
- Musimax
- MusiquePlus
- Music 24
- mjuzik.tv (Polish TV channel) (defunct)
- Music Box
- Music Box Russia
- Music Box Ukraine
- Music Box Poland
- Music Box Classic
- Music Box Dance
- Music Box Sexy
- Music Box Hits
- Music Box 00's
- Music Box 90's
- Music Box 80's
- Music Box Slovenia
- Mixtape (Polish TV channel)
- Music Choice (on-demand only)
- Music Japan TV
- Music On! TV
- Music TV
- Música por Movistar Plus+
- Musik Indonesia
- MUZU.TV
- muzo.tv (Polish TV channel) (defunct)
- Myx Global
- Nat Geo Music
- NME TV (defunct)
- NickMusic
- NickMusic (Europe & South Africa)
- Nuta.tv (Polish TV channel)
- Nuta Gold (Polish TV channel)
- Next Music+ (Polish TV channel) (defunct)
- Now 70s
- Now 80s
- Now Rock
- Now Music
- NRJ Hits
- Nusantara
- Óčko
- Óčko Star
- Óčko Expres
- Óčko Black
- PalmarèsADISQ par Stingray
- Persian Music Channel
- PopAsia
- Polo TV
- Polo Party TV (Polish internet TV channel) (defunct)
- Polsat Music
- Planet Pop
- Q TV (defunct)
- QMusic TV (Belgium)
- QMusic TV
- R101 TV
- RISE TV (Grecce TV channel)
- RMF MAXXX TV (internet Polish radio TV channel) (defunct)
- RadiantTV
- Radio 105 TV
- Radio Monte Carlo TV
- Rai Radio 2 Visual
- Raj Musix Kannada
- Rebel
- Revolt
- RFM TV
- Ru TV (Russian TV channel)
- Rusong TV (Russian TV channel) (defunct)
- Ritmoson Latino
- RTL 102.5 TV
- rbl.tv (Rebel TV) (defunct)
- RTM Muzik Aktif
- SBS M
- Scuzz (defunct)
- Schlager Deluxe
- SchlagerTV
- Slam!TV
- Smash Hits (defunct)
- Sony Mix
- Sony Rox
- Souvenirs from Earth (Selected blocks)
- Space Shower TV
- Star Maa Music
- Star Vijay
- Starz TV (defunct)
- Stingray Music
- Stingray Country
- Stingray Juicebox
- Stingray Lite TV(NL)
- Stingray Loud
- Stingray Now 4K
- Stingray Retro
- Stingray Vibe
- Sun Music
- Surya Music
- TeleHit
- The Country Network
- The Loop
- TMF (defunct)
- Tempo TV
- The Box (defunct)
- theCoolTV
- The Tube Music Network
- The Worship Network
- TO!TV (Polish TV channel) (defunct)
- Trace Africa
- Trace Caribbean
- Trace Gospel
- The Voice TV
- The Voice Norway (defunct)
- Trace Latina
- Trace Urban
- Trace Vault
- Trance Tropical
- TV DISCO (Polish TV channel) (defunct)
- TRT Müzik
- TV 538
- Tuba TV (Polish internet TV channel) (defunct)
- TV Oranje
- TVU Music Television
- Udaya Music
- UTV Romania
- [V] (defunct)
- Vevo (Internet and streaming only)
- VH1
- VH1 Soul (defunct)
- VH2
- VH1 Europe (defunct)
- VH1 Deutschland (defunct)
- VH1 India (defunct)
- VH1 Italy (defunct)
- VH1 Poland (defunct)
- VH1 Classic Europe (defunct)
- Vid-OK (defunct)
- Vintage TV
- Videomusic
- Virgin Radio TV
- Virgin 17 (French TV channel) (defunct)
- VIVA (Austria TV channel) (defunct)
- VIVA (Polish TV channel) (defunct)
- VIVA (Hungarian TV channel) (defunct)
- VIVA (UK & ireland TV channel) (defunct)
- VIVA (defunct)
- V90 (Polish TV channel) (not started)
- VOX Music TV
- VOX TV (Polish internet TV channel) (defunct)
- Wawa TV [Polish internet TV channel) (defunct)
- WTF (defunct)
- W9 (French TV channel)
- XITE
- Zee Muzic
- Zee Aflam
- Zee Vajwa
- ZUUS Country
- ZU TV
