= List of Universal Music Group labels =

Universal Music Group (UMG) owns, or has a joint share in, many of the record labels listed here.

According to the UMG official website, the main labels are Abbey Road Studios, Capitol Music Group, Decca Records, Def Jam Recordings, Deutsche Grammophon, EMI, Interscope Geffen A&M Records, Island Records, Mercury Records, Motown, Polydor Records, Republic Records, Universal Records, Verve Label Group, and Virgin Music Group, as well as other UMG divisions (Universal Music Enterprises, Music Corporation of America, Universal Music Latin Entertainment, and Universal Music Publishing Group).

== Flagship labels ==
- Decca Records
- Mercury Records
- Capitol Records
- Minos EMI

== Interscope Capitol Labels Group ==
=== Interscope Geffen A&M Records ===
- 222 Records
- Aftermath Entertainment
- Billion Dollar Baby Entertainment
- Cinematic Music Group
- Darkroom Records
- Downtown Records
- Dreamville Records
- F2 Records
- Geffen Records
- Hybe (for North American releases)
  - ABD
  - ADOR
  - Big Hit Music (for BTS' releases)
  - Belift Lab
  - Hybe × Geffen (Hybe UMG) (a joint venture between Hybe, Universal Music Group and Geffen Records)
  - KOZ Entertainment
  - Pledis Entertainment
  - Source Music
  - YX Labels
- Interscope Records
  - Interscope Miami
- KIDinaKORNER
- Lost Highway Records
- Opium
- PGLang (Kendrick Lamar's releases only)
- Shady Records
- SMG Music
- Streamline Records (Lady Gaga's releases only)
- YG Entertainment (for Blackpink' releases (2018-2023))

=== Capitol Music Group ===
- 10 Records
- 2101 Records
- Astralwerks
- The Black Label (for Meovv' releases)
- Block Entertainment
- Blue Note Records
- Capitol Records
- Capitol Christian Music Group
  - Capitol Christian Music Group Canada
- Deep Well Records
- Harvest Records (since 2013 and pre-2013 US back catalogue)
- Hi or Hey Records (Hey Violet's releases only)
- Manhattan Records
- Metamorphosis Music
- Priority Records
- RedOne Records
- SM Entertainment (for Aespa's releases in U.S. only)

== Republic Corps ==
=== Republic Records ===
- American Recordings
- Aware Records
- Babydoll Music
- Brushfire Records
- Casablanca Records
- Cash Money Records
- Hybe (for North American releases)
  - Big Hit Music (for Tomorrow X Together and Cortis' releases)
  - Hybe Latin America (for Santos Bravos' releases)
  - Quality Control Music
  - Big Machine Records
- Indie Pop Music
- Island Records
- John Varvatos Records (joint venture with John Varvatos)
- JYP Entertainment (for North American releases)
- Lava Records
- Mercury Records
- Motown
  - Motown Gospel
- Next Plateau Entertainment
- Photo Finish Records
- Rowdy Records
- RiteorWrongKVH Entertainment
- Schoolboy Records
- Serjical Strike Records
- So What the Fuss Records
- SRC Records
- Universal Arabic Music
- Universal Records
- Uptown Records
- Visva Records
- WakeOne (for Izna and Alpha Drive One's releases)
- XO Records
- Young Money Entertainment

=== Def Jam Recordings ===
- 4th & B'way Records
- Black Star Records
- Circa 13 Music

== Music Corporation of America ==
- Buena Vista Records
- Capitol Records Nashville
- Decca Nashville
- EMI Records Nashville
- Mercury Nashville
- MCA Nashville

== Universal Music Latin Entertainment ==
- All Star Records
- Capitol Latin
- Disa Records
- Flow Music
- Fonovisa Records
- Illegal Life Records
- Interscope Miami
- Ivy Queen Musa Sound Corporation
- Machete Music
- Mas Flow Inc.
- Sangre Nueva Music
- Universal Music Latino
- VI Music

== Verve Label Group ==
- Brunswick Records
- Decca Classics
- Decca Vision
- Deutsche Grammophon
- Fontana Records (Universal Music UK)
- GRP Records
- Impulse! Records
- Philips Records
- Verve Records
  - Verve Forecast Records

== Virgin Music Group ==
- [Integral]
- Downtown Music Holdings
  - CD Baby
  - AdRev
  - FUGA
  - Songtrust
  - Soundrop
- Caroline Records
- Fader Label
- Fiction Records
- mtheory Artist Partnerships
- Virgin Music Africa
- Virgin Music Argentina
- Virgin Music Australia
- Virgin Music Benelux
- Virgin Music Brasil
- Virgin Music Canada
- Virgin Music Chile
- Virgin Music France
- Virgin Music Germany
- Virgin Music Italy
- Virgin Music Japan
- Virgin Music Latin US
- Virgin Music Mexico
- Virgin Music Nigeria
- Virgin Music Nordics
- Virgin Music Norway
- Virgin Music Spain
- Virgin Music Sweden
- Virgin Music UK
- Virgin Music US
- Virgin Nashville
  - Big Loud
    - Big Loud Rock
  - Butterfly Records
- Virgin Records
- SONO Music Group

== Universal Music Publishing Group ==
- Associated Production Music (joint-venture with Sony Music Publishing)
  - Sonoton
  - Bruton Music
  - Cezame Music
  - Hard and Kosinus
- Criterion Music Corporation
- Universal Production Music
  - FirstCom
  - Killer Tracks

== Universal Music Enterprises ==
- Hip-O Records
- T-Boy Records (joint venture with Andy Gould)
- Thump Records
- UM3
- Universal Chronicles
- Urban Legends

== Mercury Studios ==
- Eagle Records
- Armoury Records
- Eagle Rock Productions
- Eagle-i Music
- Mercury Studios

== Universal Music UK ==
- Abbey Road Studios
  - Globe: Soundtrack and Score
- Decca Music Group
  - Argo Records
  - Decca Vision
  - EmArcy Records
- Universal Music On Demand
  - Universal Music Recordings (formerly UMC/Universal Music Catalogue)
    - Calderstone Productions Limited
    - Charisma Records
    - Purple Records
    - ZTT Records
- Xploded Music
  - Clubland TV
  - Now 70s
  - Now 80s
  - Now Rock
  - Now 90s & 00s

=== Island EMI Label Group ===
- Island Records UK
- EMI Records
  - EMI North
  - Vertigo Records
  - Virgin Records UK
    - Virgin Music Group
      - Harvest Records
  - Blackened Recordings
  - Mercury Records UK
    - Ensign Records (pre-1984 catalogue)
  - Motown UK
  - PMR Records
  - Positiva Records

=== Polydor Label Group ===
- Polydor Records
  - A&M Records UK
  - Rolling Stones Records
  - 0207 Def Jam
- Capitol Records UK

== Universal Music France ==
- AZ Records
- Barclay Records
- Decca Records
- Deutsche Grammophon
- ECM New Series
- MCA Records France
  - Casablanca Records France
  - PM:AM Recordings France
- Island Def Jam France (previously known as Island France, Def Jam France, Mercury Records France and Motown Records France)
- Virgin Records France (previously known as Caroline France)
- Capitol Label Services
- Universal Licensing Music
- Polydor Records France
  - Mosaert
- Universal Music Jazz France

== Universal Music Japan ==
- Polydor Records (formerly Universal J)
  - Perfume Records
  - Asse!! Records
  - Utahime Records
  - RX-Records ([Alexandros] and Bigmama releases only)
- UJ (split from Universal J)
  - Project K&P (formerly Johnnys' Universe) (joint venture with Johnny & Associates established for King & Prince)
  - Over the Top Records (formerly Top J Records) (joint venture with Johnny & Associates established for Timelesz)
  - Project TJ (formerly TJ Project) (joint venture with Johnny & Associates established for Travis Japan)
- Universal Sigma
  - A&M Records Japan
  - Double Joy International
  - DCT Records
  - Augusta Records
  - U-Cube (joint venture with Cube Entertainment)
  - Yoshimoto Universal Tunes
- Virgin Music (formed by integrating Virgin Records [formerly EMI R] and Delicious Deli Records)
  - Def Jam Recordings (used as an imprint for select releases)
  - Kinashi Records
  - Republic Records (used as an imprint for Tomorrow X Together's Japanese releases)
- EMI Records (formed by integrating EMI Records Japan and Nayutawave Records)
  - Eastworld
- Capitol Records (formerly Capitol Music)
  - Go Good Records
  - Mercury Records Tokyo (UM & Brands)
  - Holo-n
- E-Sum Records
- Tunes Tracks (joint venture with Tsubasa Group)
- Universal Classics and Jazz
- Universal D
- Universal International
  - Thunderball 667
- Pachinko Records
- Universal Strategic Marketing Japan
- Zero-A (joint venture with MTI)
- Riser Music (for releases only in japan)

== Universal Music Sweden ==
- Capitol Music Group Sweden (formerly Lionheart Music Group and Lionheart International)
  - Capitol Records Sweden
- EMI Sweden
- Kavalkad
- Lionheart Music
- SoFo Records
- Virgin Records Sweden
- Polar Music
- Pope Records
- Sonet Records
- Stockholm Records

== Other Universal Music Group national companies ==
- Universal Music Africa
  - Universal Music Cameroon
  - Universal Music Côte d'Ivoire
  - Motown Gospel Africa (Ivory Coast)
  - Universal Music Nigeria
  - Universal Music Senegal
  - Universal Music South Africa
  - Def Jam Africa
- Universal Music Andina
- Universal Music Argentina
- Universal Music Austria
- Universal Music Azerbaijan
- Universal Music Australia
  - Casablanca Records Australia
  - Dew Process
  - EMI Music Australia
  - Golden Era Records
  - Island Records Australia
  - Lost Highway Records Australia
  - Modular Recordings
  - Mercury Records Australia
  - Neon Records
  - Of Leisure
- Universal Music Belgium
- ARS Entertainment
- Universal Music Brazil
  - Arsenal Music
  - Phonomotor Records
- Universal Music Bulgaria
- Universal Music Canada (Umusic)
  - Maison Barclay Canada (Quebec)
- Universal Music Chile
- Universal Music Greater China
  - Capitol Records China
  - PolyGram China
  - Republic Records China
  - EMI China
  - Universal Music China
  - Universal Music Hong Kong
    - PolyGram Records
    - Cinepoly Records
    - Go East Entertainment
    - What's Music
    - EMI Music Hong Kong
    - Brave Music
  - Universal Music Taiwan
    - What's Music
    - EMI Taiwan
- Universal Music Colombia
- Universal Music Czech Republic
- Universal Music Denmark
  - MBO Group
  - Copenhagen Records
- Universal Music Estonia
- Universal Music Finland
  - Spinefarm Records
  - Johanna Kustannus
  - Inka Entertainment
  - Island Records Finland
- Universal Music Germany
  - Universal Music Domestic Division
  - Urban Records
  - Universal Music International Division
  - Universal Music Classics and Jazz
  - Koch Universal Music
  - Universal Music Strategic Marketing
  - Universal Music Family Entertainment
  - Polydor/Island
  - Vertigo/Capitol
  - Electrola
  - Odeon Records
- Universal Music Georgia
- Universal Music Hungary
- Universal Music India
  - Def Jam India
  - VYRL Originals
  - VYRL South
  - VYRL Punjabi
  - VYRL Haryanvi
  - VYRL Bhojpuri
  - Indiea Records
  - Oriental Star Agencies
  - Desi Melodies
  - Virgin Records India
  - Mad For Mussic
- Universal Music Indonesia
  - BLⱯCKBOARD (Blackboard)
  - Solid Records
  - GP Records
  - Massive Music Entertainment
  - Wonderland Records
  - Dominion Records
  - RFAS Music
  - Juni Records
  - Def Jam Indonesia
  - PreachJa Records
- Universal Music Ireland
- Universal Music Italy
  - Island Records Italy
  - Capitol Records Italy (formerly Polydor Italy)
  - Virgin Records Italy
- Universal Music Korea
- Universal Music Kazakhstan
- Universal Music Kyrgyzstan
- Universal Music Latvia
- Universal Music Lithuania
- Universal Music Malaysia
  - 410 Records
  - Def Jam Malaysia
  - EMI Malaysia
  - Rumpun Records
  - XO House
- Universal Music MENA
- Universal Music Mexico
  - EMI Mexico
- Universal Music Morocco
- Universal Music Netherlands
  - PM:AM Recordings
- Universal Music New Zealand
- Universal Music Norway
  - Jazzland Recordings
- UMG Philippines (internationally known as "Universal Music Philippines")
  - Island Records Philippines
  - Def Jam Philippines
  - Republic Records Philippines
  - EMI Records Philippines
- Universal Music Polska
  - Magic Records
- Universal Music Portugal
- Universal Music Peru
- Universal Music Romania
  - MediaPro Music
  - Def Jam Recordings Romania
- Universal Music Serbia
- Universal Music Singapore
  - Def Jam Asia
  - Astralwerks Asia
- Universal Music Spain
  - Vale Music
- Universal Music Switzerland
- Universal Music Tajikistan
- Universal Music Thailand
  - Def Jam Recordings Thailand
- Universal Music Turkey
- Universal Music Turkmenistan
- Universal Music UK
- Universal Music Ukraine
- Universal Music Vietnam
- Universal Production Music
  - Deutsche Grammophon Production Music
  - Flexitracks
  - KTV
  - Nuvotone
  - Sonic Beat Records
  - Volta Music

Note: Universal Music Group companies around the world are generally licensed to use most of Universal Music Group's legacy labels, such as Polydor, Mercury, etc., as imprints for their local artist repertoire.

=== Under the EMI branding ===
- EMI Arabia
- Soutelphan
- Alam El Phan
- Relax-in International
- Farasan
- Rotana Records
- EMI Music Argentina
- EMI Recorded Music Australia (domestic imprint of Universal Music Australia)
- EMI Music Brazil
- Discos Copacabana
- EMI-Jangada
- EMI Music Chile
- EMIDISC
- EMI Europe Generic
- EMI Gold
- EMI Music Ireland
- EMI Music Hungary (formerly EMI Quint)
- EMI Music Finland
- EMI Music Germany (formerly EMI Electrola)
- Electrola
- EMI Music Malaysia (distributed by Universal Music Malaysia)
- EMI Music Mexico (distributed by Universal Music Mexico)
- Awake Sounds
- Capitol Records
- Capitol Music Japan
- Capitol Latin
- Virgin Records
- Virgin Music Japan (not to be confused with Media Remoras, a Pony Canyon label formerly known as Virgin Japan)
- Eastworld
- Express
- Foozay Music
- i-Dance
- Reservotion Records
- SakuraStar Records
- SoundTown (EMI Strategic Marketing)
- Suite Supuesto!
- TM Factory
- Unlimited Records
- EMI Music Pakistan
- EMI Music South Africa
- GramCo (domestic trade name in India, former EMI licensee)
- Minos EMI (domestic trade name in Greece)
- Q-Productions
- Reliquias (domestic trade name in Argentina, license not owned)

=== Other labels ===
- Bravado
- PolyGram Entertainment
- 10:22PM
- Victor Victor Worldwide
- Field Trip Recordings
- PIAS Recordings
  - Different Recordings
  - Le Label
  - Urban
  - Harmonia Mundi
  - Inertia
  - Jazz Village
  - World Village
  - V2 Records

== Third-party major labels distributed by Universal Music Group ==
- ABKCO Records
  - Cameo-Parkway Records
- Back Lot Music
- Because Music
  - Ed Banger Records
  - Phantasy
  - London Recordings
    - Factory Records (select catalogues)
- Blackened Recordings (excluding North America)
- BMG Rights Management (physical only)
- Big Machine Label Group (would be sold to Hybe)
  - Big Machine Records
  - Valory Music
  - Nashville Harbor Records & Entertainment
  - Nash Icon Music
- Disney Music Group (excluding Russia)
  - Buena Vista Records (a joint venture between Disney Music Group and Music Corporation of America)
  - Walt Disney Records
  - Hollywood Records
  - Hollywood BASIC
    - Fox Music
      - Rachanok Entertainment (Thailand releases only)
  - DMG Nashville
  - Yuehua Entertainment
    - Redcherry Entertainment (Finland releases only)
  - Walt Disney South
- Concord
  - Craft Recordings
    - Wind-up Records
  - Fania Records
  - El Cartel Records
  - Razor & Tie
  - Varèse Sarabande
    - Varèse Vintage
- Hybe
  - ABD
  - ADOR
  - Big Hit Music
  - Belift Lab
  - Hybe × Geffen (Hybe UMG) (a joint venture between Hybe, Universal Music Group and Geffen Records)
  - Hybe Latin America
  - JCONIC Labels
  - KOZ Entertainment
  - Pledis Entertainment
  - Quality Control Music (through QC Media Holdings)
  - Source Music
  - YX Labels
- DIVA Records (owner: Iva Davies; Australia)
- Earth Hertz Records
- EDGEOUT Records
- Famous Records
- Hater Gang Records
- MDM Recordings
- Ministry of Sound Australia
- Paramount
  - Comedy Central Records (co-distributed with Alternative Distribution Alliance)
- Polyversal (previously by EMI)
- Primary Wave
  - Primary Wave Records
  - Sun Records
- Roc Nation
- Round Hill Music
- Sonorous Entertainment
- Top Dawg Entertainment
- VP Records
- Warrior Records
- Weapons of Mass Entertainment
- Zone 4

=== Third-party national licensees ===
- Actually Music (United Kingdom)
- Dreamus (South Korea (JYP Entertainment))
- Genie Music (South Korea (WakeOne))
- Helicon Records (Israel)
- JVR Music (Taiwan)
- Kakao Entertainment (South Korea (SM Entertainment))
- Mirage Records (Egypt and North Africa)
- Musica Studio's (Indonesia)
- Off the Record (Philippines)
- Pen Island Records (Philippines)
- Prime Music (Lebanon, Jordan, Kuwait, Saudi Arabia and the United Arab Emirates)
- RS Music (Thailand)
- MCN Solution One Holding Company Limited (Thailand)
- Sena (Iceland)
- Stone Music Entertainment (South Korea (WakeOne))
- Tuff Gong (Caribbean)
- Ukrainian Records (Ukraine)
- YG Plus (South Korea (Hybe, The Black Label, and YG Entertainment))

== Defunct/dormant labels ==
- 20th Century Fox Records
- 89 Arrogance Recordings
- A&M Records
- ABC Records
- Aladdin Records
- Almo Sounds
- A&M Octone Records
- Angel Records
- Argo Records
- Atlanta Artists
- Axis Records (Australia & New Zealand)
- Back Beat Records
- Backstreet Records
- Biv 10 Records
- Blackground Records
- Blue Thumb Records
- BTM Music Group Inc.
- Cadet Records
- Chess Records
- Cherrytree Records
- Chrysalis Records (North America; rest of the world outside Europe)
- Coral Records
- Cube Entertainment (11% ownership, later 8% ownership) (until 2017)
- Cypress Records
- De-Lite Records
- Decca Broadway
- Def Soul
  - Def Soul Classics
- DGC Records
- Diamond Star Entertainment
- Dolton Records
- Dot Records
- DreamWorks Records
- Duke Records
- Dunhill Records
- E.G. Records
- EMI America Records
- EMI Music Japan
- EMI Records India
- EMI Records Japan
- EMI USA (North America; until 1997)
- Enigma Records
- Fantasy Records
- Freedom
- Friends Keep Secrets
- Gasoline Alley Records
- Hut Records
- Impact Records
- Imperial Records (US & Canada)
- Infinity Records
- Ingrooves
  - Fontana Distribution
- Intercord Tonträger (Germany)
- I.R.S. Records
- The Island Def Jam Music Group
- Kapp Records
- Laurie Records
- Liberty Records (US & Canada)
- Loud Records
- Mad Love Records
- MCA Records
- Mediarts Records
- MGM Records
- Minit Records
- Mosley Music Group
- N.E.E.T. Recordings
- Nocturne Records
- Octone Records
- Odeon Records (Japan; Europe outside Germany; the Americas outside US & Canada)
- Outpost Recordings
- Pacific Jazz Records
- Paramount Records
- Parrot Records
- Peacock Records
- Perspective Records
- Pina Records
- Polydor India
- Polygram India / Music india
- Radioactive Records
- Regal Zonophone Records (Australia & New Zealand)
- Revue Records
- RMM Records & Video
- Roc-A-Fella Records
- Safehouse Records
- SBK Records
- Shelter Records
- Smash Records
- Spinnup
- Star Trak Entertainment
- Silas Records
- Teen Island
- Tennman Records
- Uni Records
- United Artists Records (North America)
- Universal Music Distribution
- Universal Music Greece (consolidated into Minos EMI)
- Universal Music Israel
- Universal Music Russia
- Universal Motown Republic Group
  - Universal Motown Records
- UZI Suicide
- Vendetta Records
- Virgin EMI Records
- Virgin Music
- Vocalion Records
- Wing Records
- WY Records

== Labels formerly distributed by Universal Music Group ==
- ARTium Recordings
- Bad Boy Records
- BME Recordings
- Disturbing tha Peace
- EarsDrummers Entertainment
- Fascination Records
- GOOD Music
- Get Money Gang Entertainment
- G-Unit Records
  - G-Note Records
- Hits Since '87
- Konvict Kulture
- Matriarch Records
- Murder Inc. Records
- Radio Killa Records
- Suretone Records
- Super Records
