= Universal Music On Demand =

UK record label; imprint of Universal Music Operations Ltd.

- Parent company: Universal Music Group
- Founded: 1998
- Genre: Various
- Country of origin: United Kingdom
- Location: London
- Official website: www.umtv.co.uk

Universal Music TV logo, used before name change

Universal Music On Demand (UMOD) is a London-based record label owned by Universal Music Group, formed in 1998 as Universal Music TV (UMTV). UMOD specialises in producing compilation albums and occasional single releases. It was founded when Seagram acquired PolyGram and merged the company's record labels under the same umbrella, replacing the PolyGram TV label.

Every UMOD/UMTV release receives extensive TV advertising. Joint venture compilations include Clubland, the Kiss Presents series, Kerrang!, MTV Unplugged, Floorfillers, Steve Wright Sunday Love Songs, Virgin Radio, Dreamboats & Petticoats, Capital Gold and the Motown albums.

== UMTV ==
In the past UMTV has also run catalogue campaigns including The Shadows, Status Quo, Tony Christie, Barry White, Sam Cooke and Engelbert Humperdinck.

A small number of individual artists were signed or transferred to this label in the early 2000s, including Malachi Cush, Alistair Griffin and Sam and Mark, though their contracts were terminated when UMTV re-focused on compilations.

In 2007, UMTV launched the Universal Music Record Label (UMRL) for heritage acts. In 2010, UMRL released albums from Simple Minds and A-ha.

UMTV is also associated with sister labels Globe Records, Family Recordings, Manifesto Records and All Around The World (AATW Productions), the last one also running music video channels in the UK.

=== UMOD ===
In 2016, UMTV relaunched as "Universal Music on Demand", with specialised projects, in the first few years of UMOD, including the launch of the British version of Kidz Bop (Kidz Bop Kids), Pete Tong and Jules Buckley's albums of orchestral reworkings of classic dance tracks, and Tommy Blaize's debut album Life & Soul. UMOD were also involved with Swedish distribution platform Spinnup, and found Forest of Dean-based singer Devon Cassells on the platform, signing him in order to issue a single called "I Don’t Want 2 B Ur Friend". Other artists signed to UMOD from Spinnup included A.T. (a London-based Nigerian pop artist) and Italian house producer Manuel Costa.

UMOD dance compilation partners AATW Productions also owned and operated four music TV channels on Freeview called Clubland TV, Now 70s, Now 80s and Now 90s, all of which became owned and run by Universal Music after they bought out joint-venture partners Cris Nuttall and Matt Cadman of AATW, with Nuttall and Cadman relaunching their dance music label under the Xploded Music name.

=== UMR ===
By 2023, their Now! That's What I Call Music albums had gone back to being released by EMI, the label which first released the compilation series in November 1983 (now in a joint venture with Sony Music CG), while greatest hits releases had been moved over to UMR/Universal Music Recordings, with projects like the Kirsty MacColl's See That Girl 1979-2000 boxset being on the schedule for autumn 2023. UMR is also the division overseeing the back catalogue of acts like ABBA, Elton John and Queen.

== See also ==
- Lists of record labels
