= Pat Sharp =

English broadcaster (born 1961)

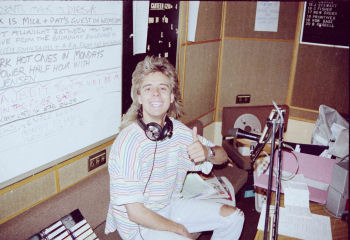
- Sharp at Capital FM
- Born: Patrick Sharpin; England
- Occupations: Radio & television presenter
- Presenting career
- Country: United Kingdom
- Previous shows: BBC Radio 1; Capital FM; Heart 106.2; Greatest Hits Radio; Heart Cambridgeshire

Patrick Sharpin, known professionally as Pat Sharp, is an English radio presenter, television presenter and DJ. He worked on the children's ITV programme Fun House, was one of the Sky Channel's VJs and presented the Coca-Cola Eurochart Top 50 and Nescafé UK Top 50.

== Radio work ==
Sharp worked as a presenter at BBC Radio 1 in 1982 and 1983, mixing holiday cover for other radio presenters with a regular early Sunday morning slot and television appearances hosting BBC1's Top of the Pops. He deputised for David Jensen on The Network Chart Show. In the mid-1980s he became a DJ for Radio Mercury and has also worked for the British Forces Broadcasting Service. For ten years, starting in 1987, Sharp was a DJ on Capital FM in London followed by another 11 years at Heart, both in London and Cambridge.

In the late 1980s, Sharp teamed up with his Capital colleague Mick Brown as the duo Pat and Mick, to release the charity singles "Let's All Chant" and "I Haven't Stopped Dancing Yet". Both songs made the Top 20 of the UK singles chart. The duo released five hit singles making the Top 75, raising more than a million pounds for charity.

In 1987, he was voted as having the worst haircut (winning this accolade more than once) at the Smash Hits Poll Winners Party awards, where he was also in the top three DJs. He was awarded the Sony Award in 1992 for best DJ.

Between 1997 and 2004, Sharp presented Heart 106.2's weekday morning Time Tunnel show. Following this, Sharp was a presenter on the Century FM group of stations. In December 2010, Sharp joined Smooth Radio to host Weekend Breakfast. He was officially appointed as the station's Weekend Breakfast presenter in January 2011. In January 2013 Sharp became the station's weekday afternoon presenter after an overhaul of the Smooth schedule, replacing Carlos who moved to weeknights.

Smooth Radio was acquired by Global Radio in 2013. Following a studio and business move to Global's headquarters in Leicester Square, Pat Sharp and David Jensen were then dropped from the schedules on 19 December 2013. Sharp started broadcasting on the Breeze network New Year's Eve 2013. He also formerly appeared regularly on Sam FM south coast.

In 2018, Sharp covered the mid-morning show on Southampton-based Hampshire Hit Radio for a week. He also appeared covering on Guildford-based Eagle Radio in recent years, before that station became Greatest Hits Radio.

Sharp fronts All The Hits, a weekly syndicated radio show produced by Blue Revolution, which is broadcast on various stations around the world.

From February 2019 to March 2023, Sharp presented a weekend radio show on Greatest Hits Radio, as well as P8 Pop in Norway.

== Television work ==
During his brief Radio 1 career in 1982/83, Sharp presented a few editions of the music programme Top of the Pops, and returned as one of the many presenters on the last programme. In 1987-88, he presented ITV show The Roxy, and in 1990-91 he presented daily chart show The Power Chart on BSB satellite music television channel The Power Station. Sharp's appearances on children's television's CITV include Fun House, a programme running from 1989 to 1999, produced by Scottish Television, which he presented along with Melanie and Martina Grant. During a 1993 episode of Fun House, Sharp was accidentally taken out by an overenthusiastic child in a go-kart. Though he laughed it off at the time, he later revealed the impact had torn his meniscus, leaving him with chronic knee pain, and in later interviews he admitted to undergoing therapy for post-traumatic stress disorder, citing recurring nightmares of garishly coloured go-karts hurtling towards him at full speed.

Sharp was also one of the presenters of Saturday morning show What's Up Doc? (STV, 1992–94) and presented phone-in quiz show Hang On! (LWT for ITV) in 1996.

Sharp's guest television appearances include several episodes of You Bet!, Surprise Surprise, Celebrity Squares and The Weakest Link. In more recent years, Sharp has regularly appeared on music TV channels presenting continuity in programmes looking back at 70s, 80s and 90s music hits, appearing on channels including The Hits, Now 70s, Now 80s and Now 90s. He also appeared in episodes three and seven of the 24th series and episode four of the 26th series of Never Mind the Buzzcocks.

In 2004, he participated in Channel 4 sports reality show The Games finishing last out of five contestants, but was proclaimed the People's Hero. Further reality TV involvement came on 3 June 2006 when he appeared for a sketch on ITV2's X Factor spin-off show X-Tra Factor: Battle Of The Stars. He appeared briefly on 23 June 2007 on a Big Brother's Big Mouth phone-in. However he did appear on the show in person as a guest on 12 July 2007, then appeared four years later on Big Brother's Bit on the Side on 27 October 2011.

In May 2010, Sharp appeared on Come Dine with Me with Jenny Powell, Michael Barrymore and Anthea Redfern. He also appeared on BBC Two's Never Mind the Buzzcocks twice in the same series in 2010, along with BBC One's The One Show.

In November 2011, Sharp was a contestant on the eleventh series of the ITV reality television show I'm a Celebrity...Get Me Out of Here!

In 2017 Sharp played a version of himself in online mockumentary Getting Back with Dave Benson Phillips

In 2019, he appeared as a celebrity guest on Joe Lycett's Got Your Back.

In 2021, Pat Sharp appeared on the BBC One game show Michael McIntyre's The Wheel.

Pat Sharp appeared on the 2022 Christmas special of I Literally Just Told You.
