= Free TV =

Free TV may refer to:

- Free TV (MENA), a Pan Arab musical television channel
- Free TV (Italy), an Italian regional television channel
- FreeTV Australia, the industry body representing free-to-air Australian TV networks
- Free TV Alliance, a collaboration between four European free digital satellite television broadcasters to promote free satellite TV
- Free TV Networks, an American digital multicasting and video-on-demand company

== See also ==
- Free-to-air television
