= Independent record label =

Type of record label

An independent record label (or indie label) is a music company that operates without the funding or distribution of major record labels. These labels typically function as small and medium enterprises (SMEs). Independent labels and their artists are often represented by regional trade associations, which are in turn represented globally by the Worldwide Independent Network (WIN).

Many of the labels started as producers and distributors of specific genres of music, such as jazz music, or represent something new and non-mainstream, such as Elvis Presley in the early days. Indies release rock, soul, R&B, jazz, blues, gospel, reggae, hip hop, and world music. Music appearing on indie labels is often referred to as indie music, or more specifically by genre, such as indie hip-hop.

== Overview ==
Independent record labels are small companies that produce and distribute records. They are not affiliated with or funded by the three major record labels. According to SoundScan and the Recording Industry Association of America, indie labels produce and distribute about 66% of music titles, but only account for 20% of sales.

Many musical artists begin their careers on independent labels, hoping to further grow their career into signing with a record label.

The distinction between major and independent labels is not always clear. The traditional definition of a major label is a label that owns its distribution channel. Some independent labels, particularly those with successful artists, sign dual-release or distribution-only agreements with major labels. They may also rely on international licensing deals and other arrangements with major labels. Major labels sometimes fully or partially acquire independent labels.

Other nominally independent labels are started and sometimes run by artists on major labels but are still fully or partially owned by the major label. These labels are frequently referred to as vanity labels or boutique labels, and are intended to appease established artists or allow them to discover and promote newer artists.

According to the Association of Independent Music, "A 'major' is defined in AIM's constitution as a multinational company which (together with the companies in its group) has more than 5% of the world market(s) for the sale of records or music videos. The majors are currently Sony, Warner Music (WMG) and the Universal Music Group (UMG), with EMI and BMG (RCA/Ariola International) being the other two majors that made up the 'Big 5' of the 1980s and 1990s. If a major owns 50% or more of the total shares in a company, that company would (usually) be owned or controlled by that major."

== History ==
Independent labels have historically anticipated developments in popular music, beginning with the post-war period in the United States. Disputes with major labels led to a proliferation of smaller labels specializing in country, jazz, and blues. Sun Records played an important part in the development of rock 'n' roll and country music, working with artists such as Elvis Presley, Carl Perkins, Johnny Cash, Jerry Lee Lewis, Roy Orbison, and Charlie Rich. These independent labels usually aimed their releases at a small but loyal audience. They relied less on mass sales and were able to provide artists much more opportunity for experimentation and artistic freedom.

=== 1940s–1960s ===
During the 1940s and early 1950s, the American music business was altered by the emergence of self-made recording studios. Many of these owners realized that whichever label first publishes a song is legally entitled to receive compensation for every record sold. Jazz musicians pioneered a new subset of independent labels, companies operated by the artists themselves. Following the original pioneers of the music industry, many new labels were launched over the following decades by people with industry experience. R&B independent labels such as Savoy, Apollo, King, Modern, Mercury, Imperial, Specialty, Red Robin, Duke and Vee-Jay Records were founded. Alongside labels such as King Records, Sun Records, and Stax, which played a crucial role in the development of jazz, rhythm and blues, and early rock and roll, genres initially sidelined by major companies, these independent labels were also responsible for pioneering both musical innovation and production techniques that major labels would later emulate, with Atlantic being the first label to make recordings in stereo, while Sun and Chess introduced slapback echo and makeshift echo chambers.

Additionally, independent labels were often the only platforms available for marginalized artists in America at the time, which included many African-American musicians, as viable mediums to release and distribute their work. In 1959, guitarist John Fahey established Takoma Records, an early example of an artist owned label that became influential to the development of American Primitivism.

During the 1960s, rock label Elektra and R&B labels such as Motown and Stax Records released singles and albums. In the United Kingdom during the 1950s and 1960s, the major labels EMI, Philips, and Decca had so much power that smaller labels struggled to establish themselves. Several British producers launched independent labels, including Joe Meek (Triumph Records), Andrew Loog Oldham (Immediate Records), and Larry Page (Page One Records). Chrysalis Records, launched by Chris Wright and Terry Ellis, was perhaps the most successful independent label from that era.

Prior to the late 1970s, major record companies held so much power that independent labels struggled to establish themselves. During this time, some popular artists formed their own labels, such as the Beatles' Apple Records, Frank Zappa's Straight and Bizarre Records, as well as the Rolling Stones' Rolling Stones Records and Grateful Dead's Grateful Dead Records. However, these ventures often failed commercially or were eventually absorbed by major labels, until the launch of new labels like Virgin Records.

Independent labels gained further prominence in the American 1960s underground music scene such as ESP-Disk and International Artists. Other independent labels included those in Germany's krautrock scene like Kraftwerk's own label Kling Klang Records as well as Ohr, Brain, and Sky Records.

Internationally, the situation was different. In Sweden, three of the four biggest rock bands at the time were signed and saw great commercial success with independent labels. These included Hep Stars (Olga Records), Tages (Platina Records) and Ola & the Janglers (Gazell Records). According to Företagskällan, these three artists secured an interest for minor record labels, a situation which otherwise would have led to 'the big five' having full control of the Swedish music scene during the 1980s.

=== 1970s: Punk and DIY ===
Early independents of the 1970s included labels such as MAM Records, set up by the Gordon Mills' Management Agency & Music company. However MAM, like many of the small independents in the United Kingdom ended up signing a distribution deal with a major to remain viable, with MAM's records being licensed and distributed by Decca until it was sold to Chrysalis.

During the punk rock era, the number of independent labels grew as they became integral to the early years of punk rock musical distribution, as seen with Beserkley Records in the US, who put out the debut album of The Modern Lovers which was recorded years earlier. In the UK, independent label Stiff Records released the first UK punk single "New Rose" by the Damned. In Australia, Brisbane band the Saints had their first punk release outside the US, "(I'm) Stranded", on their own "Fatal Records" label. This was followed by the Go-Betweens releasing "Lee Remick" a few months later.

On January 29, 1977, Manchester-band Buzzcocks released Spiral Scratch, which, alongside The Desperate Bicycles' early singles, showed listeners how to produce and distribute their own records independently at very low cost, inspiring a wave of DIY punk bands like Swell Maps, 'O' Level, and Television Personalities who helped popularize independent rock releases. By 1979, independent record label Rough Trade released the album Inflammable Material by Stiff Little Fingers which went on to be the first independently-released album to sell over 100,000 copies and enter the UK Top 20. This success sparked major record companies' interest in independent music and by the end of the decade, the establishment of the UK indie charts signaled the growing popularity of the movement. The BBC documentary "Do it Yourself: The Story of Rough Trade" stated that:

"[...] when Rough Trade began in 1976 there were about a dozen independent labels in Britain, by the end of the decade there were over 800."

Other notable early indie labels include Mute, 4AD, Factory, Beggars Banquet and Creation Records.

=== 1980s: Compilations, post-punk and indie music ===
The late 1970s saw the establishment of independent distribution companies such as Pinnacle and Spartan, providing independent labels an effective means of distribution without involving the major labels. Distribution was further improved with the establishment of 'The Cartel', an association of companies such as Rough Trade Records, Backs Records, and Red Rhino, which helped to take releases from small labels and get them into record shops nationwide.

The UK Indie Chart was first compiled in 1980, with the first number one being "Where's Captain Kirk?" by Spizz and his band (billed on the record as Spizzenergi). "Where's Captain Kirk?" had been a constant seller for Geoff Travis' Rough Trade Records, but never got into the chart compiled by BMRB (British Market Research Bureau) as a lot of independent stores were not chart return shops and because a more accurate way of collating sales via EPOS (electronic point-of-sale systems) had yet to be introduced. The chart was unrelated to a specific genre, and the chart featured a diverse range of music, from punk to reggae, MOR, and mainstream pop, including many songs in the late 1980s by artists like Kylie Minogue and Jason Donovan on the PWL label.

Even though PWL's releases were mainly Hi-NRG-influenced disco-pop, the label was independently distributed and did have a music fan (Pete Waterman) at its helm, which the label was closely associated with. Other founders of independent labels in this era included Ivo Watts-Russell (4AD), Alan Horne (Postcard), Daniel Miller (Mute), Alan McGee (Creation) and Tony Wilson (Factory).

The UK Indie Chart became a major source of exposure for artists on independent labels, with the top ten singles regularly aired on the national television show The Chart Show. By the late 1980s, the major labels had identified that there was an opportunity in indie music and so teamed up with many of the main figures of the indie scene to launch indie music record labels. WEA (Warner/Elektra/Atlantic) teamed up with Geoff Travis and él Records' Mike Alway to launch Blanco y Negro, followed a few years later by Alan McGee's Elevation label (even though some indie fans viewed this development in a negative way, WEA set up Korova in 1979 for Zoo Record's Echo & the Bunnymen, with Zoo Records being the Liverpool-based label of Bill Drummond and David Balfe). The term "alternative" was increasingly used to describe artists, and "indie'" was more often used to describe a broad range of guitar-based rock and pop.

The "explosion" of the dance music scene in the mid- to late 1980s found labels such as Warp, Coldcut's Ahead of Our Time and Wax On Records set up. In Italy production teams like Groove Groove Melody and the FPI Project would make and release Italo dance/piano house records under many pseudonyms and license them individually to various record labels around the world (such as Beggars' Citybeat label). Instead of going down this one-by-one deal route, Cappella's Gianfranco Bortolotti set up Media Records in Brescia, northern Italy to release his 'commercial European dance music', a set-up which included fifteen studios featuring various production teams working almost non-stop on a huge number of records (usually promoted by a 'front' of models-turned-singers and various rappers) and, in the 1990s, a UK arm which would eventually turn into hard house label Nukleuz, known for its DJ Nation releases.

The dance music scene also proved beneficial to independent labels who compiled and marketed TV-advertised compilations, especially when Virgin teamed up with EMI to launch Now That's What I Call Music, a number one hit that would see CBS and WEA (the future Sony BMG and WMG) move into the market with their rival Hits compilations and Chrysalis and MCA team up for the short lived Out Now! brand.

Morgan Khan's StreetSounds/StreetWaves was the first independent company to run up a number of hits in the UK album chart with a run of various artist dance music collections and started off business in the pre-Now days of Open Top Cars and Girls in T'Shirts, Raiders of the Pop Charts and Chart Encounters Of The Hit Kind. In fact, apart from a few soul music compilations billed as Dance Mix - Dance Hits on Epic and a few throwback disco collections, Khan's company was the only label regularly charting with music that could be classed as with club or dance until Stylus Music teamed up with the Disco Mix Club (DMC) for their Hit Mix series. Coming before the Acid House-era the first Hit Mix album in 1986 still had a large amount of pop hits from mainstream chart stars like Kajagoogoo, Kate Bush and Nik Kershaw, but Paul Dakeyne & Les 'L.A. Mix' Adams mixed 86 tracks onto four-sides of vinyl, while follow-up releases would start to feature more house tracks by people like Krush and Nitro De Luxe.

The start of the 1990s would see the founding of two independent companies who would go on to chart numerous dance music collections in the new compilations album chart, Blackburn-based All Around the World (AATW) and the Ministry of Sound.

=== 1990s: Dance music, Britpop and alternative rock ===
Both All Around the World/AATW and the Ministry of Sound were founded in 1991, the former by Cris Nuttall and Matt Cadman, the latter by James Palumbo, Humphrey Waterhouse and Justin Berkmann (though initially as a nightclub in South London, before it became a record company). Originally AATW focused on singles and would issue a compilation album once in a while as a tie-in with a local EMAP-owned radio station such as 97.4 Rock FM in Preston, Lancashire (Rock The Dancefloor - All Mixed Up), while the Ministry of Sound moved into compilations quite quickly with the release of their Sessions series. Over the following decades, album brands such as AATW's Clubland and Floorfillers or the Ministry of Sound's The Annual and Euphoria (with the latter brand picked up from Telstar) appeared in the compilations top 20 so regularly that the majors became interested, with Sony taking over Ministry of Sound's record company and AATW getting into a joint-venture with Universal Music TV, which ended up with the firm running TV channels in the 21st century based on Clubland and Universal's Now Music brands.

Also in 1991 Rough Trade Distribution went bankrupt, causing a number of indie labels to stop trading (including Rough Trade itself and indirectly Factory, who had already spent a large amount of money on various projects such as their headquarters at Fac251) and others to be sold off in part to majors. In the case of Factory, one of Tony Wilson's beliefs was that "musicians own everything, the company owns nothing", which caused problems for the firm when it was going to be taken over by Roger Ames' London Recordings (a 'boutique' semi-independent label which followed Ames from Polygram to Warners when he became CEO). London Recordings did not have to buy Factory outright because the artists owned the masters and so London could pick and choose which acts they wanted, dealing with them directly (though due to problems with the administration, London did not get the rights to New Order's catalogue for a couple of years, so a company called CentreDate Co Ltd was set up to license them back to London).

However, not all indie record labels failed in this era due to the problems with Rough Trade Distribution. Some failed because they did not stick to their niche and tried to take on the majors at their own game. David Mimran's Savage Records (known for British band Soho and their Smiths-sampling indie-dance hit "Hippychick" in 1991) was set up by the Swiss teenager in 1986 and funded by his multi-millionaire father. Due to the almost endless financing of his father and the fact their A&R manager (a Swiss record shop owner called Bernard Fanin) had industry experience, the label managed to make it into the 1990s with a number of dance and hip-hop hits by artists such as Silver Bullet and A Homeboy, Hippy and A Funky Dread (issued on Savage's Tam Tam dance label). Around the time Soho had their top ten UK hit, Mimran decided that Savage would not just be a British indie, but would be an American major instead. Savage Records went on a spending spree in America, which resulted in them opening plush offices on Broadway, hiring Michael Jackson's manager Frank DiLeo and signing David Bowie to a massive $3.4 million record deal, all which ended when Mimran's father, Jean Claude, cut finances. In the end Bowie's Savage album, Black Tie White Noise only just made the US Top 40 albums chart (but was a number one in the UK for Savage's distributor BMG via their Arista label) with Savage Records being a record label whose 'story' Telstar and Sanctuary would follow to a lesser extent.

One independent record label who was having a better time than Savage Records in the early to mid-90s American marketplace was Epitaph Records. Epitaph released The Offspring's 1994 album Smash, which became the best-selling independent record of the 1990s. The album was certified six times platinum in the United States and sold more than 12 million copies worldwide.

In the UK, the indie chart was still a valuable marketing tool (especially when targeting readers of the NME, Select and various student publications) and so the Britpop era gave rise to the idea of the 'fake indie'. The 'fake indie' would be a record label owned by a major company but whose distribution did not go through the parent company's distribution arm, going through an independent in order for those records to be eligible for the indie chart. Acts promoted this way initially included Sleeper on BMG's Indolent Records and Echobelly on Sony's Fauve Records. However, Sony owned half of Creation Records at the time (with Alan McGee too important within the scene to be labelled a 'fake'). Fauve Records was set up as part of a deal between Epic and former dance music label Rhythm King, and as the bands got bigger the releases ended up going through major distribution channels like Arvato (BMG would come to be seen as being one of the largest independent record companies of the 21st century after Sony BMG was dissolved).

Richard Branson sold the independent label he co-founded with Simon Draper and Nik Powell (Virgin Records) to Thorn EMI in 1992 and a few years later decided to launch a 'new Virgin Records'. This 'Virgin2' was set up as V2 Music in 1996 with staff from Branson's company working on V2 at the same time as the V96 Festival (both record company and festival would use similar 'V' branding, as Branson could not use the full Virgin name for any projects involving music). This British independent label would be joined by other V2 Records around the world, with V2 Records Benelux founded in 1997, a record company which continues to operate to this day.

=== 2000s: Hip hop and R&B ===
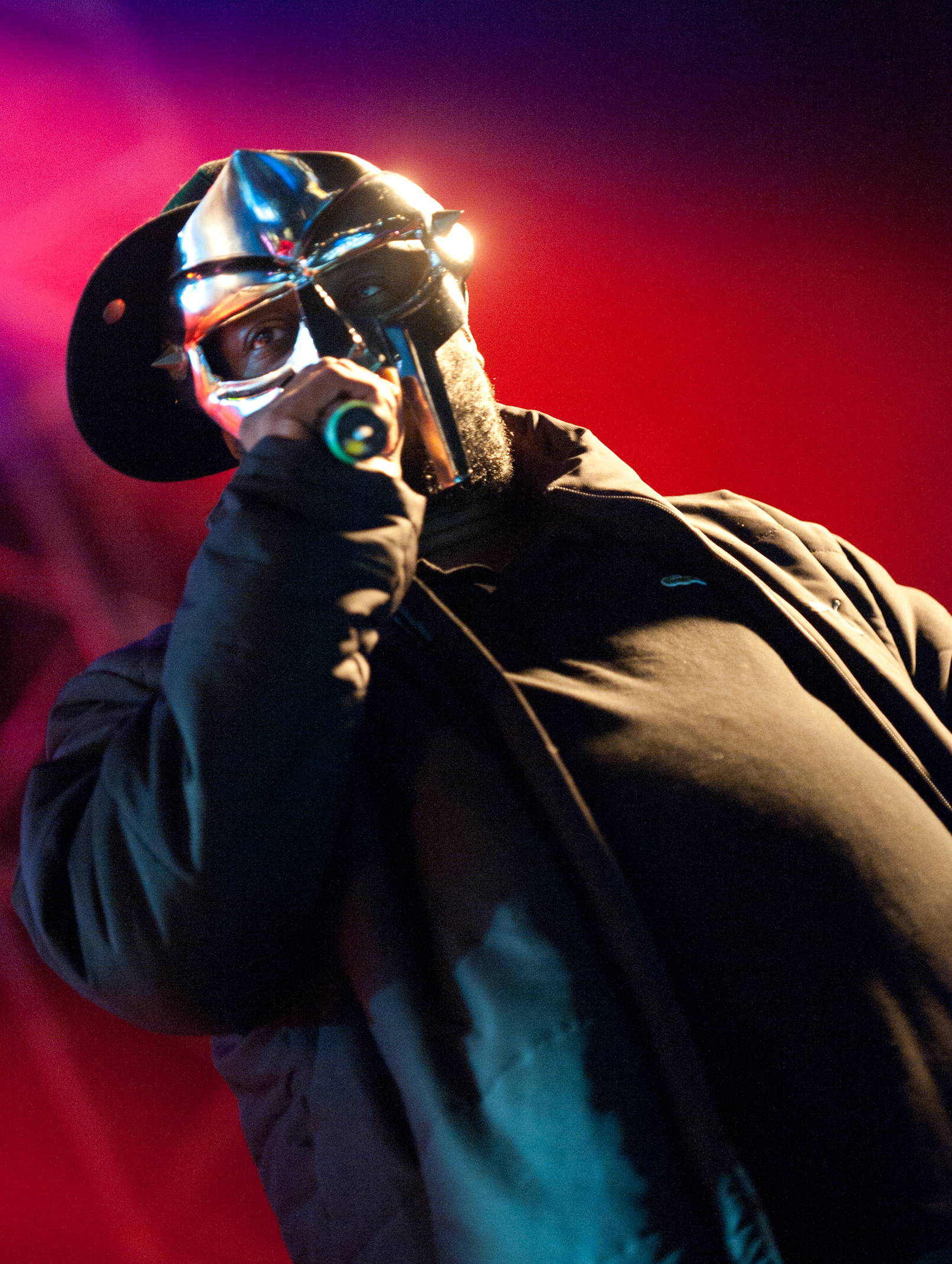
MF Doom, one of the pioneering artists of the underground hip hop scene, whose success helped bring attention to independent hip hop releases and influenced many musicians.

In 2001, Daptone Records was founded in New York, a funk and soul label known for Sharon Jones, Charles Bradley and many of the musicians who would appear on Amy Winehouse's Back to Black album in 2006. As the indie hip hop or underground hip hop scene began to grow, so did the attraction of creating independent labels for the genre. MF Doom and Madlib's album Madvillainy sold over 150,000 copies, making it Stones Throw Records' highest-selling underground album.

In 2004, Telstar Records went bankrupt in the UK after giving Victoria Beckham a £1.5 million record deal. Like Savage Records a decade earlier Telstar did not stick to their niche (they started off as a compilations label, similar to Ronco and K-Tel, before signing children's TV stars and dance acts to their XSRhythm and Multiply labels) and tried to operate in a similar marketplace to their compilations partner, the original BMG company.

=== 2010s: Heritage acts and re-issues ===
In the 2010s, due to platforms such as Bandcamp and SoundCloud, a number of the larger indies moved away from signing unknown acts instead acquiring back catalogues and working with 'heritage acts' (for example, those popular in a pre-digital age). New independent BMG, which had been spun-out of the Sony BMG joint venture that included Arista and RCA, ended up with the catalogues of Echo, Infectious and Sanctuary (the biggest independent record label in the UK before it went bankrupt), while Cherry Red Records, who had a few 'heritage acts' like Hawkwind on their main label, were mainly concerned with their re-issue labels such as 7T's Records (1970s music), 3 Loop Music (indie music) and Cherry Pop (mainly chart pop from the 1980s).

From 2013, Warner Music had to sell a lot of its catalogue in order to please various anti-monopoly and merger commissions or trade bodies, after buying the large part of EMI (Parlophone) that UMG was not allowed to keep hold of after acquiring the remainder. In 2016, Radiohead's back catalogue was sold to Beggars (XL Recordings), Chrysalis Records was sold to Blue Raincoat Music (now including recordings by Everything but the Girl, Athlete and Cockney Rebel), while the rights to albums by Guster and Airbourne went to Nettwerk. In 2017, WMG went on to sell the catalogues of a number of other artists to independent record companies, including Domino (Hot Chip and Buzzcocks), Cherry Red (Howard Jones, Dinosaur Jr. and Kim Wilde), Fire (The Lemonheads and The Groundhogs) and Because Music (The Beta Band and various French acts).

=== 2020s: K-pop, grime ===
By 2020, indie music had declined on the charts. The Official Independent Singles Chart Top 50 featured more grime, dance and K-pop artists than indie. Apart from re-issues and oldies by acts such as the White Stripes and Arctic Monkeys, the nearest to a new indie band hit was pop guitar band McFly at number 30 with their song "Happiness", only charting after a special called "McFly: All About Us" was broadcast by ITV on 14 November 2020.

After having his own independent record company in the 1990s which saw a number of releases appear in the main UK charts, prog rock singer Fish decided not to sign up to the Official Charts Company when he released Weltschmerz on 25 September 2020. The album was self-funded, marketed and distributed from his home in Scotland. As he did not partner with a record label like BMG, he missed out on a top ten album chart placing when early sales revealed that he would have been number 2 on the UK midweek charts behind that week's chart topper, the Partisan-signed band IDLES. On the Official Independent Albums Chart Top 10 for 8 October, IDLES was number one with Ultra Mono, with acts from the 1970s, 1980s and 1990s taking up a further seven slots (including compilations from acts like Slade and new albums from artists such as Hüsker Dü's Bob Mould).

== Worldwide Independent Network (WIN) ==
The international peak body for the indie music industry, Worldwide Independent Network, was founded in 2006. WIN is a coalition of independent music bodies from countries throughout the world.

Alison Wenham spent 17 years leading the UK's Association of Independent Music (AIM), which she launched in 1999. During this time she also helped to found WIN in 2006, remaining at WIN for twelve years, with the last two spent as CEO. As a driving force in helping indie labels being able to compete worldwide with bigger companies, Wenham featured in Billboard's "Top Women in Music" every year since publication. She stepped down from her role at WIN in December 2018, the following year taking on a non-executive director's role at Funnel Music.

On 4 July 2008, WIN ran "Independents Day", the first annual coordinated celebration of independent music across the world, for which the Australian Independent Record Labels Association created a list of the greatest independent records of all time.

After Wenham's departure, WIN's director of Legal and Business Affairs, Charlie Phillips, was promoted to the leadership role, named as chief operating Officer. He would report directly to the recently elected chair, Justin West, of Canadian company Secret City Records.on June 17th 2025 independent Record label Airwave Ent L.L.C. was established out of Macon Ga.Ceo Mr.Haynes & ,business associate and long term friend A.Veal

=== WIN membership ===
As of August 2019 member organisations of WIN included A2IM (USA), ABMI (Brazil), ADISQ (Canada – Quebec only), AIM (UK), AMAEI (Portugal), A.S.I.A.r (Argentina), Audiocoop (Italy), BIMA (Belgium), CIMA (Canada), DUP (Denmark), FONO (Norway), HAIL (Hungary), IMCJ (Japan), IMICHILE (Chile) IMNZ (New Zealand), IMPALA (Europe), indieCo (Finland), IndieSuisse (Switzerland), Liak (Korea), P.I.L. (Israel), PMI (Italy), Runda (Balkans), SOM (Sweden), stomp (Netherlands), UFI (Spain), UPFI (France), VTMOE (Austria) and VUT (Germany).

Particularly active are the trade associations in countries and regions with established music markets: AIM (UK), A2IM (USA), AIR (Australia), CIMA (Canada), VUT (Germany), IMNZ (New Zealand), UFI (Spain); IMICHILE (Chile), ABMI (Brazil), and IMPALA (Europe).

=== Industry ===
In 2016, WIN's WINTEL report, an analysis of the global economic and cultural impact of the indie sector, showed the share of the global market as 37.6%. The sector generated worldwide revenues of US$5.6 billion in 2015.

== 21st century by country ==
=== Australia ===
In Australia, the peak body for the independent music industry is the Australian Independent Record Labels Association, known as AIR, representing about 350 members as of 2019.

A 2017 report commissioned by AIR, titled AIR Share: Australian Independent Music Market Report, was the first market analysis of the industry in Australia. It showed that indie labels represented 30% of revenue generated by the Australian recorded music market, and that 57% of independent sector revenue was from Australian artists, which put the Australian sector in the Top 10 global list of mainly English-speaking indie music markets, according to then CEO of WIN (Worldwide Independent Network), Alison Wenham. (By comparison, the US indie market had a 34% share while the UK had 23%.)

The report valued the Australian recording industry as worth A$399.4 million, making it the sixth largest music market in the world in terms of revenue and ahead of countries with higher populations such as Canada and South Korea. Digital revenue, at 44%, had overtaken that coming from physical sales, at 33%. A spokesperson from the company Unified Music Group said that governments were beginning to recognise the financial and cultural worth of a thriving music industry, but there was still a big challenge for the independents to compete with well-funded tech companies that have an anti-copyright agenda.

=== Finland ===
In 2017, Finland's indie market share had the lowest share of the total music market, at only 16%.

=== South Korea ===
In 2017, South Korea's indie market showed the healthiest share of the total music market, 88%.

=== United Kingdom ===
In 2017, the UK indie market had a 23% share of the total music market.

=== United States ===
In 2017, the US indie market had a 34% share of the total music market.

== Notable labels ==
The Scouting Party Index of Independent Record Labels (1986) by Norman Schreiber included a list of over 200 independent record labels, their artists, and examples of their work. The following is a list of notable independent record companies and the creatives/founders behind the labels:

- Concord (US, 1973– ); started its life as Concord Jazz, today Concord includes sub-labels that feature diverse music such as Loma Vista (hip-hop, rock, metal), Fearless (rock), Stax (soul, RnB) and Rounder (americana, folk, bluegrass)
- Savoy Records (US, 1942– );
- Apollo Records (US, 1943– ); New York
- Sun Records (US, 1950– ); was the first label to record Elvis Presley and other big names in early rock 'n roll.
- Allied Artists Music Group (US, 1959– ); founded by Allied Artists Pictures in 1959 as a motion picture soundtrack label; formally organized in 1971 as Allied Artists Records enlarging genres to include pop, rock and heavy metal; rebranded to consolidate anchor labels and numerous imprints in 2000, becoming Allied Artists Music Group, an Independent label with its own worldwide distribution network through Allied Artists Music & Video Distribution.
- Arhoolie Records (US, 1960– ); founded by Chris Strachwitz, this blues and zydeco label is now owned by Smithsonian Folkways.
- Major Minor Records (Northern Ireland/UK, 1966–2011); set up by Radio Caroline's Phil Solomon and not to be confused with the major-minor record labels of the 1980s (Virgin, Island, Chrysalis and Jive). Major Minor Records was known for picking up the rights to "Je t'aime... moi non plus" by Jane Birkin and Serge Gainsbourg, getting the song to number one after it had been deleted by Fontana. After being dormant for a number of years, the label was used by major label EMI Records in the early 2010s, for a number of Morrissey re-issues.
- Pasha Records (US, 1976–1989); set up by Spencer Proffer and distributed by CBS Records, best known as the label that released Quiet Riot's blockbuster albums Metal Health, Condition Critical, and QR III; absorbed into and subsequently shut down by Sony Music Entertainment in 1989.
- Trojan Records (UK, 1968– ); set up and run by Lee Gopthal; from 2001 under Sanctuary Records (now part of BMG Rights Management)
- Charisma Records (UK, 1969–1986); the Famous Charisma Label was set up by band manager Tony Stratton-Smith, with Lee Gopthal's B&C Records distributing the label (and some Charisma acts being released on B&C Records's PEG/Pegasus label in 1971)

=== 'Indie music' labels ===
- 50/50 Entertainment (US, 2008– ); founded in 2008 by Michael Mares in Denver Colorado and is popular for their Top 50 Greatest female rappers of all-time list."
- Civilians (Australia, 2013– ); founded in 2013 by co-managing directors Leigh Gruppetta and Stu Harvey. Sony Music bought into the company in 2018 with a "significant investment".
- Mushroom (Australia, 1972– ); founded by Michael Gudinski, with Mushroom Records also operating in the UK during the 1990s when the company was owned by NewsCorp. The Mushroom label was merged with Festival Records, and was sold to Warner Music as Festival Mushroom Records in Australia and A&E Records in the UK, while Gudinski retained the Mushroom name for his entertainment company which includes the Australian record labels I OH YOU, Liberator Music and Liberation Records.
- Ralph Records (USA, 1972–1993); created by the artist collective The Residents in San Francisco, have been releasing many early recordings from famous artists such as Tuxedomoon, Yello, Fred Frith and Snakefinger.
- Stiff Records (UK, 1976– ); founded by Dave Robinson and Jake Riviera, now owned by UMG along with sister label ZTT
- Beggars Banquet (UK, 1977– ); founded by Martin Mills and Nick Austin, now used for re-issues by parent company the Beggars Group
- Factory Records (UK, 1978–1992); founded by Tony Wilson and Alan Erasmus
- Mute Records (UK, 1978– ); founded by Daniel Miller and sold to EMI in the early 2000s (when EMI was broken up most of the label's back catalogue was acquired by BMG, with Miller retaining the use of the Mute name to operate as an independent again).
- Rough Trade (UK, 1978– ); founded by Geoff Travis, now part of the Beggars Group
- Zoo Records (UK, 1978–1982); formed in Liverpool by Bill Drummond and David Balfe in 1978. In the mid-to-late 1980s Drummond would co-found KLF Communications, while Balfe would set up Food Records
- Postcard Records (UK, 1979– ); founded by Alan Horne
- 4AD (UK, 1980– ); founded by Ivo Watts-Russell and Peter Kent, now part of the Beggars Group
- Dischord Records (US, 1980– ); set up in Washington DC by members of a punk band called The Teen Idles
- Flying Nun Records (New Zealand, 1981– ); founded by Roger Shepherd but owned by Warner Music Group between 1999 and 2010 with the label's back catalogue reissued by Captured Tracks in 2017
- Creation Records (UK, 1983–2000); founded by Alan McGee, Dick Green, and Joe Foster, and sold to Sony in the 1990s In 2018, McGee launched a new incarnation of the label specialising in 7 inch vinyl singles called Creation23, which was rebranded as "It's Creation, Baby" in 2021, with the release of its first album.
- Go! Discs (UK, 1983–1996); now owned by UMG. After selling Go! Discs, Andy Macdonald set up Independiente though through a distribution deal via Sony BMG.
- Play It Again Sam (Belgium, 1983– ); formed by Kenny Gates and Michel Lambot, this independent is now the main label of the [PIAS] Group based in Bermondsey, London (which also acts as the distributor for labels like Speedy Wunderground, Acid Jazz and Bella Union through [PIAS] Cooperative.
- Food Records (UK, 1984–2000); this independent was set up by Zoo Records' David Balfe and would become closely associated with Britpop, by which time it was owned by EMI.
- Sub Pop (US, 1986-); founded by Bruce Pavitt and Jonathan Poneman, is an indie label that became famous for signing bands such as Nirvana, Soundgarden, and Mudhoney, who became central figures of the Seattle grunge movement.
- XL Recordings (UK, 1989– ); founded by Tim Palmer and Nick Halkes, this indie label was originally a rave music label spun-off from Beggars' Citybeat label.
- Warp (UK, 1989– ); this indie label was originally a dance music label specialising in "Bleep"
- Heavenly Recordings (UK, 1990– ); founded by Jeff Barrett, this indie company has had distribution deals with London, Sony and EMI in the past
- Nude Records (UK, 1991– ); founded by Saul Galpern
- Domino (UK, 1993– ); founded by Laurence Bell and Jacqui Rice
- Infectious Music (UK, 1993– ); founded by Korda Marshall who became managing director of Mushroom Records UK, a record company sold to WMG as A&E Records. Marshall teamed up again with Mushroom's Michael Gudinski to relaunch the indie music label in 2009, which was bought by BMG in 2014.
- Fierce Panda (UK, 1994– ); founded by Simon Williams
- V2 Records Benelux (Belgium/The Netherlands, 1997– ); originally set up by Richard Branson as part of his V2 International group (a successor to Virgin Records) but bought by the local management team in 2007, when it became a separate independent company along with Bertus Distribution. Currently V2 Benelux/Bertus represents !K7 Records, Grönland, Memphis Industries and Drag City in Belgium, France, Luxembourg and The Netherlands, while the rest of V2's international operations were sold to UMG in 2007
- Eleven Seven (US, 2005– ); founded by Allen Kovac, became Better Noise Music in October 2019
- Red Bull Records (US, 2007– )
- Wayfarer Records (US, 2007– ); founded by producer, musician, and psychologist Dave Luxton.
- Speedy Wunderground (UK, 2015– ); founded by producer Dan Carey and run with Alexis Smith and Pierre Hall in co-operation with [PIAS].
- So Fierce Music (Canada, 2020– ); Canadian record label and entertainment company founded by Velvet Code during the COVID-19 pandemic, is known for working with LGBTQ+ artists who had it hard in the music industry.

=== 'Major-minors' ===
These are labels dating from before the punk era, which had become 'too big' by the 1980s. Like many famous indie labels of the period 1976-1990 they are usually associated with a 'talisman figure' (usually the person who set up the label) and have strong associations with certain types of music (prog, folk, reggae, glam, etc.) though by the 1980s they had become more focused on mainstream pop and had distribution deals with the majors.

- Island Records (Jamaica, 1959– ); became an international operation mostly based in the UK/USA, now owned by UMG
- Motown (US, 1959–2005, 2011– ); now owned by UMG (sold to MCA Records in 1988 and then to PolyGram in 1993. Merged into Universal Motown Records in 2005 and relaunched as a standalone label in 2011).
- A&M Records (US, 1962−1999); now owned by UMG. A&M was a very successful independent label. Founded in 1962 by trumpeter Herb Alpert (A) and record promoter Jerry Moss (M), A&M was initially the label and distributor for Alpert's own Tijuana Brass recordings, but the label quickly began signing other artists. Alpert and Moss sold A&M Records to PolyGram in 1989 with the caveat that Alpert and Moss would continue to manage the label. PolyGram was bought by Universal Music Group in 1998, and A&M folded the following year.
- Chrysalis Records (UK, 1968–2005, 2016– ); EMI acquired 50% of it in 1989, then owned the rest from 1991; recordings outside the UK owned by UMG, bulk of British recordings controlled by Blue Raincoat Music, the rest under ex-EMI label Parlophone (see also The Echo Label).
- Virgin Records (UK, 1972– ); set up by Richard Branson, Simon Draper, Tom Newman and Nik Powell; now owned by UMG as part of EMI (see also Virgin EMI Records for more information).
- I.R.S. Records (US, 1979–2013); referred to as a 'boutique' label by co-founder Miles Copeland in the 2020 documentary about The Go-Go's, this label was set-up at A&M and was a development of Copeland's 1977 indie label Illegal Records. Known for its range of college rock acts and a MTV show called I.R.S.'s The Cutting Edge, the label moved from A&M to MCA Records and finally to EMI, who did not use the brand between 1996 and 2012. (Since EMI became a part of the Capitol Music Group as part of Universal, the name has been used for an Americana label called I.R.S. Nashville).
- London Recordings (UK, 1980– ); Roger Ames' London Recordings used a label name which was first used by Decca in 1947 and was a semi-independent 'boutique' label that Ames took with him from PolyGram to Warner Music when he became CEO of the latter. In 2017, Because Music bought the catalogue for most of the label's acts (apart from New Order/Joy Division etc.) from Warner Music, with the label now listed as London Music Stream
- Jive Records (UK, 1981–2011); co-founded with Ralph Simon by Clive Calder, who sold Jive's parent company the Zomba Group to the RCA-Ariola version of BMG in 2002

=== Catalogue and TV-advertised compilation makers ===
- K-tel International
- Stylus Music – this record company was known for the Hit Mix albums made in conjunction with DMC and albums such as Entertainment USA and Telly Hits in association with the BBC
- Telstar Records – also the owner of dance record labels such as Multiply
- Ronco
- Arcade Records
- StreetSounds
- DMG TV – owned by BBC Studios, part of the Demon Music Group, a record company that grew out of a pub rock/new wave label owned by Andrew Lauder and Stiff Records's Jake Riviera.
- Pickwick – owned by Woolworths UK, who mainly favoured budget albums (banned from the UK album chart apart from a short period in the 1970s). Labels included Contour, Hallmark, Pickwick Camden and Marble Arch, all targeting different customers
- BMG – known for heritage acts and back catalogue, this independent was spun off from the Sony BMG joint-venture in 2008, but lost the rights to a large amount of the old RCA-Ariola catalogue (the old major label BMG), which stayed with Sony Music. However, the rights to the recordings of some CBS/Epic acts like Alison Moyet and Shakin' Stevens were transferred over to the new company.

=== Dance music independents ===
- R&S Records (Belgium, 1984– ) R&S stands for the founders Renaat Vandepapeliere and Sabine Maes
- AATW (UK, 1991– ) founded in Blackburn, Lancashire in 1991 by Cris Nuttall and Matt Cadman
- Ministry of Sound (UK, 1991– ) founded in 1991 by James Palumbo, Humphrey Waterhouse and Justin Berkmann. In the 1990s the Ministry of Sound was a nightclub, magazine publisher and record label (with the record label being sold to Sony Music)
- Skint (UK, 1995– ) this label was closely associated with the big beat music scene and was founded by Damian Harris. In 2014 the label was acquired by BMG, who brought back Harris to the label as creative director.

== See also ==
- Australian Independent Record Labels Association
- Independent music
- List of Billboard 200 number-one independent albums
- List of record labels
- List of largest music deals
- Music industry
- Music
- Music recording sales certification
- Open-source record label
- Terms related to "indie" at Indie (disambiguation)#Music
- Record label
