= Greatest Hits TV =

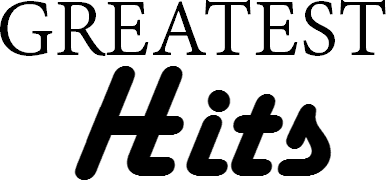
- Country: United Kingdom

Programming
- Picture format: 576i (SDTV 16:9)

Ownership
- Owner: UltimateHits Limited
- Sister channels: Channel AKA; Clubland TV; Planet Pop

History
- Launched: 29 March 2010
- Replaced: Rockworld TV
- Closed: 23 October 2013
- Replaced by: NOW Music
- Former names: Lava (2010–2011)

Greatest Hits TV was a British satellite TV music channel owned by UltimateHits Limited. The channel is ultimately owned by All Around the World Productions, a British record label who also operated Channel AKA, Clubland TV and Planet Pop.

== History ==
Lava logo

The channel launched on 29 March 2010 on Sky channel 378 as Lava. Lava specialised in the Indie and rock music genres. Lava's remit was to provide a platform for young rock, pop punk and indie musicians, and features young unsigned music acts from around the United Kingdom. Lava was a sister channel of Channel AKA, which was also owned by Mushroom TV, and replaced Rockworld TV which operated on Sky channel 378 and closed at 7.00am on 29 March 2010. Both the Lava and Channel AKA formats allowed viewers to decide on the station's playlist through the use of a voting system which enables viewers to watch the videos they want to see.

On 26 April 2011, Lava was rebranded as Greatest Hits TV at 23.45pm. Lava continued on Greatest Hits TV as overnight programming block, called Lava Showcase, between 3.00am and 8.00am, until the autumn 2012 widescreen relaunch of GHTV.

On 22 June 2012, Mushroom TV entered liquidation. Ofcom's television broadcast licensing update for May 2012, indicates that Greatest Hits TV was sold to UltimateHits Limited.

In early autumn 2012 GHTV (and Channel AKA) were relaunched in 16:9 widescreen with new onscreen graphics. GHTV moved from an 'artist showcase' format to a wider format including more multi-artist chart-countdown shows: single-artist programmes focused on major stars' work (typically billed as "Every Big Hit From [name]") continue to appear on occasion. In the relaunch, the channel also moved from mostly focusing on current artists to a cover broader range encompassing 80s and 90s hits as well as contemporary output. The relaunch also saw the Lava Showcase block dropped in favour of various-artist overnight block 'Insomnia'.

On 16 November 2012 the channel was temporarily renamed 'Christmas Hits TV' with a change to Christmas themed programming and the on-screen graphics and idents. On 21 June 2013, the channel introduced seasonal branding once again, renaming itself as 'Summer Hits TV'.

On 23 October 2013 the channel was closed and replaced by NOW Music.
