= Mushroom TV =

Former British television company

Mushroom TV Limited was an English television company and owner of several satellite television music channels. Mushroom operated Channel AKA, Starz TV and Greatest Hits TV. The company was launched in 2000 and, according to their website, were fully committed to supporting British acts and helping them to achieve success in the music industry.

On 22 June 2012, Mushroom TV entered liquidation. Ofcom's television broadcast licensing update for May 2012, indicates that Channel AKA was sold to All Around the World Productions, Starz TV to Cloud Television One Limited and Greatest Hits TV to UltimateHits Limited.

UltimateHits Limited was also a subsidiary of All Around the World Productions, hence NOW Music (Greatest Hits TV's replacement, now Now 80s) is an AATW channel.

In late 2013, Starz TV was bought by CSC Media Group. On 3 April 2014, CSC closed BuzMuzik for Starz TV to broadcast, due to the latter having a more popular audience share.

Channel AKA was renamed Massive R&B on 1 June 2018, which itself was renamed as Total Country on 1 November 2018, and later Now 70s on 27 December 2019. On 13 December 2018, Starz TV, along with its three sister music channels, were bought by TRACE Group. The channel closed on 1 June 2020.
