= Desert Heat =

Desert Heat may refer to:

- Desert Heat (film) (a.k.a. Inferno), a 1999 film by John G. Avildsen
- Desert Heat (hip hop), a United Arab Emirates hip hop band
