= MTV Music =

MTV Music may refer to:

== Television channels ==
- MTV Music (Australian and New Zealand TV channel)
- MTV Music (British and Irish TV channel)
- MTV Music (Greek TV channel)
- MTV Music (Italian TV channel)
- MTV Music (Polish TV channel)
- MTV Music 24, a Pan-European music television channel

== Websites ==
- MTV Hive, a music news and video website previously called MTV Music
- MTV Artists Platform, an online music portal, successor to MTV Hive

== See also ==
- List of MTV channels
