= Free TV (MENA) =

Pan-Arab musical television channel

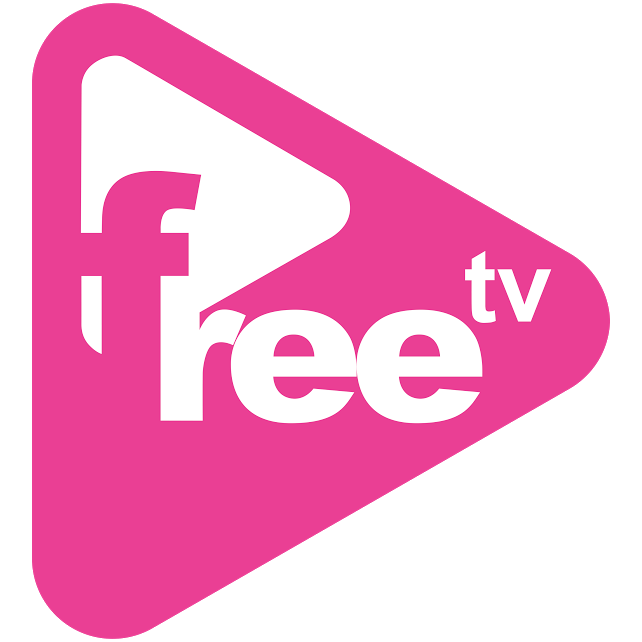
- Logo used from 2014, July 2015 to May 2017.
- Country: Egypt
- Broadcast area: North Africa; Middle East
- Headquarters: Cairo, Egypt

Programming
- Languages: Arabic; English; Spanish; Korean; French; Portuguese; Japanese; Hindi; Italian; German; Turkish; Armenian; Greek; Romanian; Albanian; Chinese
- Picture format: 576i SDTV

Ownership
- Owner: Nasr Mahrous

History
- Launched: July 20, 2015
- Closed: July 1, 2025

Links
- Website: www.freetvmusic.tv

Free TV (stylized as free^{tv}) was a 24-hour Pan-Arab musical television channel owned by Nasr Mahrous and headquartered in Cairo, Egypt. Its main target demographic was teenagers, high school and college students and young adults. It had special partnerships with FreeMusic Art Production, Vevo, RedOne, Republic Records, Warner Music Group, Universal Music Group and Sony Music.

According to the channel's owner, Free TV was planned to launch in the summer of 2014, however, launched in 2015 via Nilesat. Nasr Mahrous also said that the name of the channel was chosen in order to be similar with "FreeMusic", the name of the record label he owns.

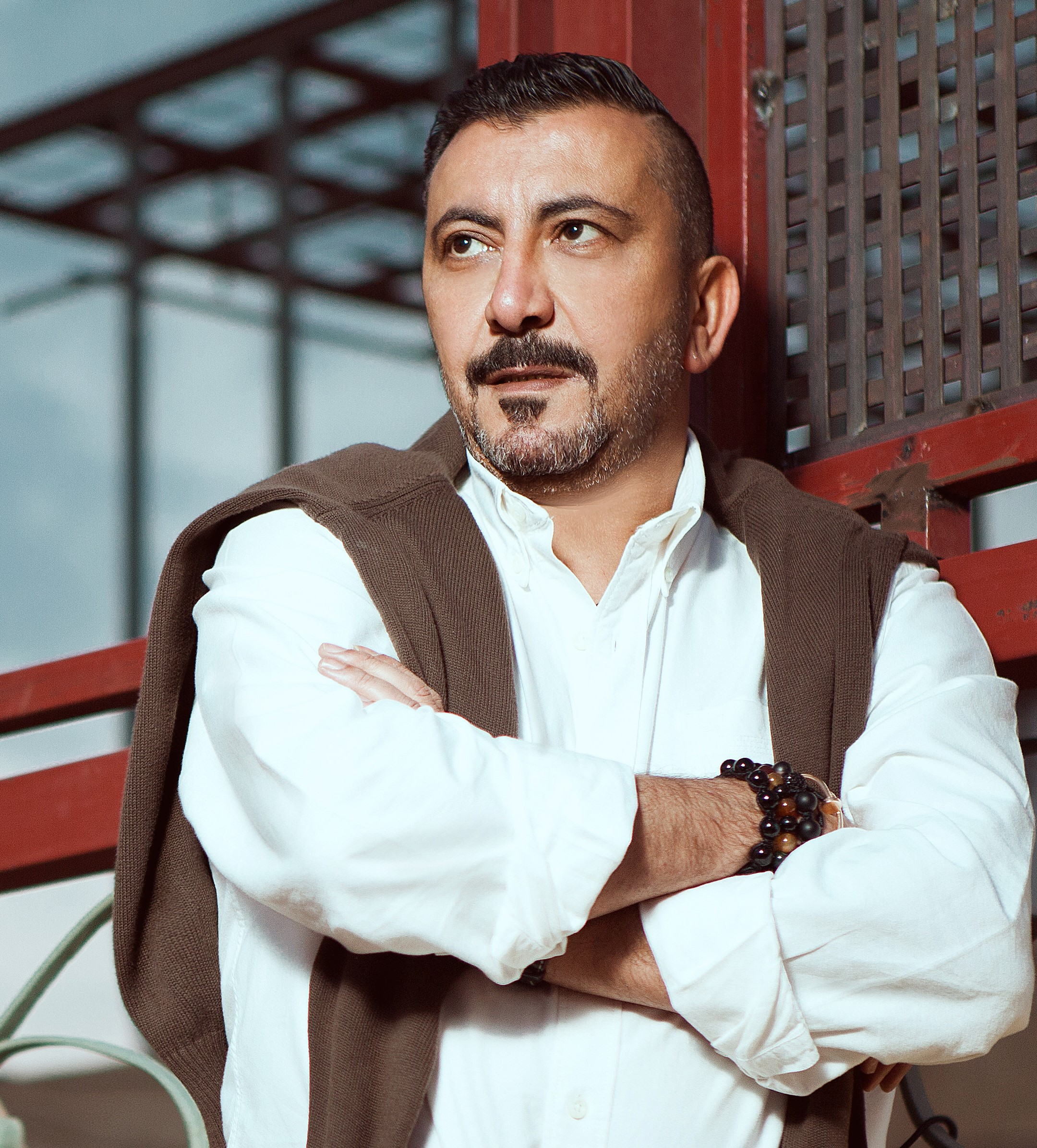
Nasr Mahrous, owner of the channel.

The channel's main objective was to combine different cultures through the language of entertainment, and to be a showcase of modern and classic Arab and international music blended together. and many other independent labels, in addition to international majors labels such as Vevo, RedOne, Republic Records, Sony, Universal and Warner Music Group.

Free TV was rated on the top of the musical television channels in North Africa and the Middle East, for providing an exclusive, outstanding and quality content of clips and programs, and creating awareness about new talents, songs and albums from all over the Arab world.

== Programming ==
Free TV aired mainly western music videos and clips of artists signed to and produced by Vevo, RedOne, Republic Records, Warner Music Group, Universal Music Group and Sony Music record label, the channel used to focus on then current music – with a heavier focus on so-called adult contemporary pop and pop rock than today – as well as music from the channel also played some Hip Hop hits, from artists like Roddy Ricch and DaBaby., as well as many Arabic music clips produced by FreeMusic Art Production record label, that is also owned by Nasr Mahrous.

- Big Apple Music Awards
- Brit Awards 2017
- Brit Awards
- BRIT Awards
- The Brit Awards
- The BRIT Awards
- Beyoncé: Lemonade
- Grammy Awards
- The 1001 Seasons of Elie Saab
- Easter Hour
- Free Mashup
- Mashup
- Love Songs
- Latin Hour
- The Mix
- Special Hour
- The Mix Special Hour
- Ramage - Ya Lil (Al Anisa Farah)
- Grease: Live
- One Direction: This Is Us
- Katy Perry: Part of Me
- Justin Bieber: Never Say Never
- American Music Awards of 2018
- 2016 Billboard Music Awards
- American Music Awards
- Billboard Music Awards
    - The Nominees
    - The Boys
    - The Girls
- Artist: Greatest Hits (alt. name: "In Love with Artist")
  - Ariana Grande
  - Beyonce
  - Bruno Mars
  - Calvin Harris
  - Coldplay
  - David Guetta
  - Drake
  - Ed Sheeran
  - Justin Bieber
  - Lady Gaga
  - Miley Cyrus
  - Rihanna
  - Selena Gomez
  - Taylor Swift
- The Nominees
- The Boys
- The Girls
- Artist x Artist x Artist:
- Miley Cyrus X Selena Gomez X Demi Lovato
- Drake X Nicki Minaj X Post Malone
- Maroon 5 X One Direction X Ed Sheeran
- J Balvin X Jason Derulo X Bruno Mars
- The Weeknd X Rihanna X Ariana Grande
- Justin Bieber X Shawn Mendes X Charlie Puth
- Stromae X Kendji Girac X Aya Nakamura
- Taylor Swift x Katy Perry x Adele
- Harry Styles X Shawn Mendes
- Justin Bieber: Greatest Hits
- Dance Hits
- Worldwide Hits
- Harry Styles
- Justin Bieber
- Girls vs. Boys
- Global Superstars
- Artist: Greatest Hits
  - Adele
  - Ariana Grande
  - Aya Nakamura
  - Billie Eilish
  - Beyonce
  - Bruno Mars
  - BTS
  - Calvin Harris
  - Cardi B
  - Demi Lovato
  - Dua Lipa
  - Drake
  - Ed Sheeran
  - Halsey
  - Jonas Brothers
  - Justin Bieber
  - Kendrick Lamar
  - Kendji Girac
  - Lady Gaga
  - Miley Cyrus
  - Nicki Minaj
  - One Direction
  - Post Malone
  - P!nk
  - Rihanna
  - RedOne
  - Stromae
  - Sam Smith
  - Selena Gomez
  - Shawn Mendes
  - Taylor Swift
  - The Weeknd
- Artist vs. Artist
  - SZA X Doja Cat
  - Harry Styles vs. Zayn
  - Coldplay vs. The 1975
  - Lil Nas X vs. Kehlani
- Artist vs Artist vs Artist
  - Bruno Mars Vs Charlie Puth Vs Shawn Mendes
  - The Weeknd Vs BTS Vs J Balvin
  - Olivia Rodrigo Vs Dua Lipa Vs Billie Eilish
  - Drake Vs Doja Cat Vs Lil Nas X
  - Ed Sheeran Vs Taylor Swift Vs Adele
  - Imagine Dragons Vs The 1975 Vs Coldplay
  - David Guetta X Calvin Harris X Tiesto
  - Justin Bieber X Post Malone X Ariana Grande
  - Avicii Vs Calvin Vs Guetta
  - Adele vs. Sam Smith vs. Ed Sheeran
  - Dua Lipa vs. Zara Larrson vs. Mabel
  - Martin Garrix VS Tiesto VS Zedd
- Hottest
  - Superstars!
  - The Weeknd Vs Doja Cat Vs Ariana Grande
  - Dua Lipa Vs Justin Bieber Vs Camila Cabello
  - Worldwide Super Hits
  - Drake Vs Post Malone
  - Tiësto Vs David Guetta Vs Calvin Harris
  - The Collabs!
  - Adele Vs Ed Sheeran Vs Lady Gaga
  - Imagine Dragons Vs Coldplay
  - Ladies Vs Gentlemen!
  - Harry Styles Vs Taylor Swift
  - BTS Vs Olivia Rodrigo Vs Lil Nas X
    - Girls
    - Boys
- Artist: Greatest Hits
  - Ariana Grande
  - Drake
  - Dua Lipa
  - Ed Sheeran
  - J Balvin
  - Lady Gaga
  - Shawn Mendes
  - Taylor Swift
  - The Weeknd
- 10s Stars
- Adam Lambert's Fierce Pride Anthems!
- Kim Petras' Wooh-Ah! Top 20
- Olly Alexander's Prideography!
- RuPaul's Lip-Sync Extravaganza
    - Nominees: The Boys
    - Nominees: The Girls
    - The Nominees!
- Artist: Collaborations
  - Ed Sheeran
  - Justin Bieber
  - Calvin Harris
  - David Guetta
- Hit Collaborations
  - The Boys
  - The Girls
- Euro
  - Hits!
  - Dance Hits!

=== Channel content ===
The channel shows video clips of Arabic and International music stars, coverage of international concerts, to distribute self-produced video clips and concerts, interviews with stars, and news programs on the international world and is managed by a team with over thirty years of experience in the music industry. Its target demographic is youth.

== Content ==
The channel aimed to be a platform for the youth, letting their opinions be a large factor in future programming. It was likely that Free TV would push local R&B and hip hop music. Akon, Ludacris, as well as Lebanese-Canadian Karl Wolf, Qusai aka Don Legend the Kamelion - the first hip hop artist, and the UAE's Desert Heat.

=== Non-English music ===
Until "Despacito" acquired the status of a global mega-hit, Free TV did not regularly play music sung in another language than English, but since Spanish-language música urbana became hugely popular outside of Latin America or the Latin American communities around the world in the late 2010s, the channel had begun to regularly play videos from artists like Luis Fonsi, J Balvin, Bad Bunny, Rosalía, Maluma, Anitta, as well Spanish songs by Shakira.

=== Artists' series ===
- Adele
- Alicia Keys
- Ariana Grande
- Aya Nakamura
- Beyonce
- Black Eyed Peas
- Britney Spears
- Bruno Mars
- Calvin Harris
- Coldplay
- Dua Lipa
- Elton John
- Ed Sheeran
- George Michael
- Jennifer Lopez
- Justin Bieber
- Justin Timberlake
- Katy Perry
- Kelly Clarkson
- Kendji Girac
- Kylie (Minogue)
- Lady Gaga
- Little Mix
- Madonna
- Maroon 5
- One Direction
- P!nk
- Queen
- Issam Alnajjar
- Rihanna
- RedOne
- Stromae
- Sam Smith
- Shawn Mendes
- Taylor Swift
- Whitney Houston

== See also ==
- MTV Middle East
- Rotana Mousica
- Melody Hits
- MBC Loud FM
- MBC 4
- MBC+ Variety
