= Melanie and Martina Grant =

British twin actresses and singers

- Born: Melanie Jane Grant; Martina Cara Grant; 18 November 1971 (age 54); Margate, Kent, England
- Other names: The Fun House twins; A.T.T.
- Occupations: Actresses, presenters, singers
- Years active: 1978–present
- Television: Fun House
- Children: Melanie 1 girl; Martina 1 boy 1 girl
- Website: funhousetwins.co.uk

Melanie and Martina Grant are a pair of British twin actresses, presenters and singers best known in the UK as presenters/cheerleaders on long-running gameshow Fun House and in Japan for their album A Twin Thing.

== Personal lives ==
The twins were born in Margate, Kent in 1971. They now live in Ramsgate.

Melanie is now called Melanie Bambridge. Her husband was a firefighter who died of leukaemia in 2009.

Martina also married; her married name was Martina Deal but she divorced in 2009. She now lives with her new partner, they had a baby boy in March 2012 and in February 2015 they had a girl. In August 2016 Martina married her partner Ben Freebury.

== Television ==
In 1986 Melanie appeared alongside Bill Oddie as a dancer in ITV comedy From the Top.

In 1987 they both appeared in an episode of a BBC cop show called Rockliffe's Babies credited simply as 'Girl in flat'.

From 1989 until 1999 they appeared alongside Pat Sharp in all 11 series of long-running gameshow Fun House as cheerleaders/co-presenters.

In 1993 they appeared as themselves in an episode of STV talk show Scottish Women discussing twin related issues.

In 1993 (S1 Ep 17) and 1995 (S3 Ep 28) they made a guest appearance on ITV Saturday morning show What's Up Doc?.

In 2011 they also appeared on a segment of This Morning called Guess the guests.

In January and May 2013 they made guest appearances on Soccer AM.

They have also appeared in The Bill and on Michael McIntyre’s Big Show.

== Film ==
In 1983 they appeared in the film Monty Python's The Meaning of Life among the group of children singing the song Every Sperm Is Sacred.

They also appeared in the 1989 Batman movie.

== Stage ==
From 1978 until 1981 Melanie appeared as Molly in Annie at the Victoria Palace Theatre.

In 1981 Martina appeared as Brigitta alongside Petula Clark in the London revival of The Sound of Music at the Apollo Victoria Theatre.

In 1983 they both appeared in the Micky Dolenz directed production of Bugsy Malone at Her Majesty's Theatre.

In 1994 they appeared as Dandini and the Prince alongside Wayne Sleep in Cinderella at the Harlequin Theatre, Redhill.

In 2000 they appeared as Swash and Buckle in Dick Whittington at the Devonshire Park Theatre in Eastbourne.

They have also appeared in productions of Red Riding Hood and Snow White.

== Music ==
Martina appeared on the cast recording of The Sound of Music.

=== A.T.T. ===
A Twin Thing

Studio album by A.T.T.
- Released: 19 May 1999
- Genre: Dance, Hip-Hop
- Length: 63:30
- Language: English
- Label: Avex

Singles from A Twin Thing
- 1. "Keep On Pumping'" Released: 19 May 1999

On 19 May 1999 they released an eponymous album called A Twin Thing which was released in Japan but was less successful elsewhere. The track Keep On Pumping was also released as a single and on various compilation albums. The album was released on iTunes and Amazon on 21 July 2014. The download version does not include the two remixes of Keep On Pumping.

Track list

- Keep On Pumping
- We're A.T.T.
- Flame Inside
- Fallen Angels
- Say Yes
- I Think Of You Always
- Revolution Love
- Girlfriend
- A Twin Thing
- Won't Fall Down
- Influence My Body
- Something 'Bout Us
- Keep On Pumping (Pete Doyle Mix)
- Keep On Pumping (Bulletproof Mix)
