= Rockworld TV =

- Country: United Kingdom

Programming
- Picture format: 576i (SDTV 16:9)

Ownership
- Owner: Carnaby Media

History
- Launched: c. 2006
- Replaced: Musicians Channel
- Closed: 29 March 2010
- Replaced by: Lava
- Former names: Redemption TV

Links
- Website: https://www.rockworld.tv/

Rockworld TV was a British television channel which featured rock music, and was aimed to highlight "underground" lifestyles and artists.

It broadcast on Sky Digital ch. 378, and also streamed content online. Officially it was only on the air from 6pm until the early morning, although previews ran during the rest of the day (apart from a few hours of Teleshopping programmes), making Rockworld effectively a 24-hour channel.

Rockworld broadcast many recorded concerts by metal and goth artists such as Machine Head, Nightwish, Killing Joke, Electric Eel Shock and Pitchshifter, and also broadcasts interviews with bands. Some music programmes were filmed at rock festivals such as the Bulldog Bash.

Non-music programmes included the anime series Cromartie High School and Gilgamesh, Dave Vanian's Dark Screen (an amateur horror film showcase) and Peek-A-Boo, interviews with artists and fetish models. Presenters included Jane Gazzo and Lenore.

Rockworld TV replaced Redemption TV, which broadcast during the evening/late night on the now-defunct Musicians Channel (also ch. 368) in 2005. Any websites linking to Redemption TV (which previously had a sizeable website) now redirect to rockworld.tv.

On 18 November 2009, Rockworld TV was removed from Sky Digital channel 378.

On 18 December 2009, Rockworld TV returned to the Sky EPG. However, the channel only broadcast for two hours a day (6am - 8am) and acted as a "placeholder" until the EPG slot was sold. During February 2010, the license and slot were transferred to administrators, Alexander Poultney Limited, with a view to launching Mushroom TV's channel, Lava.

Rockworld TV closed for the final time at 7am on 29 March 2010. Its place on Sky Digital 378 was taken by Lava, a channel dedicated to the rock and indie music genres.

On 1 February 2012, Rockworld TV relaunched as an iPhone and iPad app containing two channels, one "Metal" showcasing its existing rare footage, and promising to showcase new acts through its "Fresh" channel.
