= Fun House (British game show) =

British children's TV game show (1989–1999)

- Genre: Game show
- Created by: Bob Synes
- Presented by: Pat Sharp
- Starring: Melanie and Martina Grant
- Announcer: Gary King
- Country of origin: United Kingdom
- Original language: English
- No. of series: 11
- No. of episodes: 145

Production
- Executive producers: Sandy Ross; Elizabeth Partyka
- Producers: Elizabeth Partyka; Anne Mason; Ann Walker; Alan Harding; Kim Kinnie
- Running time: 25 minutes
- Production company: Scottish Television

Original release
- Network: ITV
- Release: 24 February 1989 – 29 December 1999

Related
- Fun House

Fun House is a British children's game show, based on the American show of the same name, that aired on ITV from 24 February 1989 to 29 December 1999. It was hosted by Pat Sharp, who was also aided by twin cheerleaders Melanie and Martina Grant. The announcer was Gary King. The theme tune was composed by David Pringle and Bob Heatlie. In 2000, it was revealed by the BBC programme TV's Finest Failures that a spin-off of Fun House featuring adult contestants was also planned. A pilot was produced, which included Carol Smillie as a contestant, but it was ultimately never broadcast.

== Format ==
Each episode featured two teams, each consisting of a boy and girl, representing schools from around the UK. There were three rounds in each episode.

=== Round 1 (3 Messy Games) ===
The opening games, each worth 25 points, were referred to as messy games and typically used gunge as opposed to food. One game would be for the two boys, another game for the two girls and a third game for all four players, though the order would vary from episode to episode. In later series, occasionally all games would be for all four players. From Series 1 to 7, the contestants were usually barefoot when playing some of the messy games; this was discontinued from Series 8 until the show's end. One of the three games would be a "key game", in which the losing team would get the same points as their score in that game.

As in the original American version, a question would follow each game, to the value of 25 points if answered correctly.

=== Round 2 (The Fun Kart Grand Prix) ===
==== 1989–1994 ====
The Grand Prix was run in red and yellow coloured go-karts and lasted for two (later three) laps. Teams race round the track picking up tokens to add to their score, alternating drivers with each lap. The first lap was for "10" tokens for 10 points, the second for "25" tokens for 25 points, plus 25 points for winning the race. Tokens that ended up on the floor were null and void. The tokens were later dropped into appropriately coloured boxes and added to the team's current score.

==== 1995 ====
By 1995, the Grand Prix was extended to three laps and the numbered tokens were replaced with generic silver tokens with a blue stripe, and they were all worth 25 points. The winning team received 50 points and there was no driver changeover after the second lap.

The original format was revived in late 1995, but kept the third lap (which became a speed lap for 25 points, not 50) and the higher value tokens were collected first.

==== 1996–1997 ====
In 1996, tokens were replaced with buttons and the start of the race was similar in style to a regular Grand Prix race. There were buttons for 10 points and 25 points, pressed on alternate laps.

When it came to adding the points up, they were represented by a column of lights for the "10" buttons and the "25" buttons, and added to the team's score.

==== 1998–1999 ====
For the 1998 series, the buttons were replaced with wheels. There were four metal wires hanging above the track with all four steering wheels attached. There are four steering wheels for each team (valued at 25 points) bringing the maximum total points to 100. The first lap was a "power up" lap, the second lap was for the second team member to collect their first two wheels, the third lap was for the first team member to collect the second two wheels, the fourth lap was another power-up lap where the second team member has to win the race and collect an extra "50" points, (25 in 1999). Wheels dropped on the floor were not counted and neither were wheels collected on the second and third laps. #The points were shown on the lights, this time representing the number of wheels collected, by Pat Sharp hitting the button on top of the team's podium. In 1999, the lights resembled the steering wheels. The results, as usual, were then shown in numbers on the LED screen on the team's podium.

=== Round 3 (The Fun House) ===
For two minutes, each teammate in turn would enter the Fun House and collect three prize tags and exit.

In the UK version of the show, to actually win the power prize, they not only had to grab the tag (picking it up would be signaled by the sound of a rooster crowing, accompanied by the appropriate animation), they also had to answer one question (often multi-parted) correctly within ten seconds. Also, the only prizes in the Fun House were non-monetary because of a law in Europe stating that children cannot win money on game shows. The Fun House itself was completely different from the US version. In that version, the Fun House itself was actually designed like a house, whereas in the UK version, it was designed to be a cross between a Funhouse ride that is often found at fairgrounds and a soft play area found at indoor playgrounds. When Gary King announced the prizes that were available, there was originally video footage of the prize location shown with an inset for a photograph of the prize. From 1998, a diagram of the Fun House was shown with the prize location illuminated, and the inset still shown, when the prize was announced.

== Fun House designs ==
=== 1989–1993 ===
Much smaller but more colourful than later ones. It is almost entirely different from later versions.

=== 1994 ===
Much larger than the previous version and had a recurring theme of a bully (an inflatable figurine of such a person) in the Fun House, this included the inflatable bully at the back that was the same size as the Fun House.

=== 1995–1997 ===
The bully element has been removed from the show and the space previously occupied by the large bully figure at the back incorporated some flashing coloured lights and fake 'windows' to emphasise the 'house feel'. This was accompanied by colourful flashing studio lamps whereas the final run in previous series simply had the same studio lighting level that had been present throughout the entire episode.

=== 1998 ===
The Fun House has been completely rebuilt, but much based on the 1993–1997 version (although the big leap changed from another tube slide to some giant steps). This included the Fun House being coloured of only red and yellow, instead of the multi-coloured Fun House used previously. The front entrance area has been completely redesigned. This included the removal of the "Fun House" logo hanging above the entrance and the removal of the two car-wash style spirals, being replaced by two stacks (one at either side) with blocks on top, each one having a Fun House logo on it. Also, this Fun House seems larger than the previous incarnations, and certain parts of it have been completely redesigned (the Snake Pit, for example, instead of simply being a multicoloured box with springy snakes inside, is now a more traditional snake basket.) Also, when Pat Sharp introduces the Fun House at the start of each episode, from now on, there are more explosions and firework bangs in the Fun House rather than simply two spark machines either side of the Fun House entrance logo. These "improved" explosions also included a few smoke machines to give a better impression of the special effects and along with sound effects throughout the teams 'run' through the fun-house added to the 'wackiness' and atmosphere. Also, a wall of stacked boxes was added at the entrance of the fun house after Gary King announced the episode's prizes, and the 1st player would plough through the wall to start the round when Pat said GO.

=== 1999 ===
The final version was a slight redesigning of the Fun House. This included a change to the Big Leap from a tall fire fighter's pole leading to the giant steps to a zip-line seat built to carry the player from the top of the Fun House to the bottom ball pool.

== Fun House obstacles ==
Series 1

Top Floor

- Punch the Panels - A window of panels (LHS)
- Tube - Rotating tunnel connecting Punch the Panels and the Volcano
- Volcano - Small Climbing Wall (Central)
- Rope Bridge - Connecting Volcano and Weather Box
- Weather Box - A cloud containing snow released by three levers (RHS)
- Balloon Tree - A number of silver helium filled balloons to act as a cloud (RHS)

Top to Middle Floor

- Steps - Steps connecting Punch the Panels to Pots of Gold (LHS)
- Lava Slide - Straight Slide connecting the Volcano and Lava Pool (Central)
- Slalom - A white zig-zag slide from the Weather Box to the Snow Drift (RHS)

Middle Floor

- Pots of Gold - Three pots of gold to rummage in (LHS)
- Bridge - A bridge connecting the Pots of Gold to the Lava Pool
- Lava Pool - Red ball pool at the bottom of the Lava Slide (Central)
- Pumping Pistons - Crawl space connecting the Lava Pool and Snow Drift
- Snow Drift - White ball pool at the bottom of the Slalom (RHS)

Middle to Bottom Floor A series of steps, ladders and slides Bottom Floor

- Engine Room - (LHS)
- Balloon Tunnel - (LHS, in front of the Engine Room)
- Lava Swamp - A series of difficult to climb through foam letters spelling out 'FUN' (RHS)

Series 2

- Box of Tricks - Now a computer panel than a window. Replaced Punch the Panels (LHS)
- Cloud 9 - Replaced the Balloon Tree and Weather Box (RHS)
- Tied Up In Nets - A net tunnel. Replaced the Bridge
- Lava Flow - The middle 'volcano' ball pool was renamed, and the bottom ball pool became the Lava Pool
- Lava Cleaner - An update to the pumping pistons
- Lava Swamp - The letters were now inflatable (RHS)
- Cog Wheels - A series of cogs spinning on the wall at the edge of the Lava Swamp (RHS)

Series 3

- The Temple - Each of three skulls when pressed would reveal creature from the temple. Replaced Box of Tricks. (LHS)
- The Python - A snake wrapped around the tube
- Temple Doors - One of four levers would open the doors to the temple. Replaced the Volcano (Central)
- Aztec Wall - A series of holes in a temple wall. Replaced Cloud 9 (RHS)
- Net Maze - An update to Tied Up In Nets
- The Masher - An update to the pumping pistons
- Test Tube - The lava pool had added test tubes

Series 4

Series 4 saw a major redesign, and provided the most used layout. There were many additional ladders, and slides, not all of which had prizes attached to them. The entrance was straight into the ball pit which had three possible routes from it. To the left the balloon tunnel; to the right the monster maze; and straight ahead to go up to the raised middle platform.

- Balloon Tunnel – A tunnel filled with balloons, it was the lengthiest obstacle to complete and had a right hand bend in it before requiring a climb to the middle platform to get out of it. LHS.
- Monster Maze – An area at the front of the fun house filled with hanging punchbag monsters. RHS.
- Skelter Belter – A helter-skelter like slide which leads to the bottom ball pool of the Fun House from the middle platform.
- Climbing Net (a.k.a. Net Ladder) – A net to climb up to the top of the Fun House. From here there were three directions: the Flying Fox (back left); The Bob Sleigh (front left) or the Danger Net (front right).
- Danger Net – A net bridge which leads to the wild slide.
- Wild Slide – A very steep and fast tube slide from the Danger Net to the ball pool.
- Flying Fox – A zip line which went from the top of the Climbing Net to the Fire fighter's Pole and/or Crawl Tube
- Crawl Tube (a.k.a. Tumbling Tube) – A big plastic tube to crawl through
- Fire fighter's Pole – A long pole similar to a fire fighter's pole to slide down from the top to the middle of the fun house.
- Ball Run – A long ball pit at the back of the fun house reachable from the Fire fighter's Pole
- The Bob Sleigh – A bob sleigh which goes down a large slide from the top of the fun house which leads to the sneaky slip 'n' slide, In Series 4 features a Skateboard & changed in Series 5–11 with a Cresta-Run style cart with volts and sparks.
- Sneaky Slip-n-Slide – Another tube slide opposite the wild slide but less steep and fast.

Series 5

- Hole In The Wall – A wall with 5 holes, and the tag hides behind one of them. Notice that the holes are pictures of the Bully's family, at the top of the Climbing Net (Series 5 only)
- Bully – A giant head of a bully with giant teeth, contestants have to punch his teeth to get the tag at the entrance to the Balloon Tunnel (Series 5 only)
- Trash Cans – Three rubbish bins filled with rubbish. After the tag is dropped, it is hidden inside one of the bins. In front of the Monster Maze (Series 5 only)

Series 6

- Crazy Cuckoo (a.k.a. Clock Room) – A giant bird coop with a green bird puppet inside, with its head sticking out the door. The tag hides somewhere around the coop. (Series 6 only)
- Machine Room – A room full of cartwheels, where the prize tag hides in one of the petals of one of a cartwheel. (Series 6 only)
- Connections Wall – A wall with trunks inside, and the player had to make the right connection to one of the trunks in order to grab the tag (Series 6 only)

Series 7

- Jungle Jump – The fire fighter's pole in the 7th series, except with jungle like tree leaves on it (Series 7 only)
- Stone Faces – Hawaiian like stones with holes in their mouths, and the player had to punch out the right hole of that stone face to grab the tag, at the top of the Climbing Net (Series 7 only)
- Pullovers – A closet-like area full of long-sleeved sweat-shirts with a tag hidden in one of the sleeves of one of the shirts, in front of the Balloon Tunnel (Series 7 only)
- Hungry Burgers – An area with 3 cheeseburgers, and one of the burgers has the tag hidden somewhere in its patty. In front of the Monster Maze (Series 7 only).

Series 8

- Giant Steps – A giant staircase at the front of the house, connecting the ball pool with the middle floor replacing the Helter Skelter
- Angular Triangular – A box with two triangle-shaped spinning shelves inside, and the tag hides somewhere on one of the shelves at the top of the Climbing Net (Series 8 only)
- Magic Curtain – A foam rubber curtain which contestants could walk through on the middle floor (Series 8 only)
- Turning Twister – A box, oppose to Angular Triangular, with 5 spinning circles, in which the tag hides in one of the circles (more like the Hole In The Wall) in front of the Balloon Tunnel (Series 8 only)

Series 9

- Snake In The Box – A box filled with snakes. Notice the title sounds more like a Jack In The Box, but much different than a real Jack in the Box, at the top of the Net Climb
- A Frame – A climbing frame in the shape of a capital A, replaced the Magic Curtain
- Gong Crazy – A large box with a polystyrene gong at the front, smash it open to get the tag. In front of the Monster Maze (Series 9 only).

Series 10

Series 10 saw another redesign, although not quite so dramatic. Several elements were kept as were the major platforms. The Snake In The Box; Fire fighter's Pole; Flying Fox; Ball Run; Climbing Net; A-Frame; Giant Steps; Danger Net; Crawl Tube; and WildSlide were untouched.

- Balloon Tunnel – A tunnel filled with balloons, it became half the length and was entirely straight and relocated to the right hand side of the ground floor.
- The Bob Sleigh – The Bob Sleigh was redesigned to reach a set of steps
- Sunken Well - An area with four long plastic tubes, with ropes attached to them, and one of the tags is also attached to one of the ropes of that tube, on the platform after the Flying Fox
- Tall Tower – A very large tower with a ladder to climb up to the top of the Fun House, which also leads to the end of the Crawl Tube.
- The Big Leap – A big fire fighter's pole near the Crawl Tube which drops the player off to the top of the Giant Steps (Series 10 only)

Series 11

- The Big Drop – A zip-line seat built to carry the player from the top of the Fun House to the bottom ball pool (Series 11 only)

== Transmissions ==
Series	Start date	End date	Episodes	Day of week
1	24 February 1989	26 May 1989	13	Friday
2	23 February 1990	25 May 1990	13	Friday
3	4 January 1991	5 April 1991	13	Friday
4	6 January 1993	31 March 1993	13	Wednesday
5	6 January 1994	31 March 1994	13	Thursday
6	5 January 1995	30 March 1995	13	Thursday
7	8 September 1995	15 December 1995	14	Friday
8	13 September 1996	6 December 1996	13	Friday
9	12 September 1997	12 December 1997	14	Friday
10	25 September 1998	18 December 1998	13	Friday
11	22 September 1999	29 December 1999	13	Wednesday
11	22 September 1999	29 December 1999	13	Friday

== Wacky Warehouse version ==
In 2015, Fayre & Square and Wacky Warehouse launched a one-off revival of Fun House. The format had changed dramatically, as in this revival, the kids had a parent in their team, there were now four teams instead of two; the blue and green teams in addition to the red and yellow teams, the Wacky Warehouse soft play area had played the role as the fun house, with not only it playing the fun house's usual role of where the kids from the winning team collect prize tags (and their parents too in this version), but before that round it also played a role in the build a burger relay round, where the kids in the four teams find parts of the burger in the fun house for their parents to build in the quickest time possible, which replaced the Go-Kart round. It was reported that the Go-Karts were brought to the Wacky to be set up in the car park outside the pub, but were never set up due to the rainy weather conditions on the day that filming took place. The show was also somewhat watered down to a quiz show, and the parents of the losing teams at the end of the quiz rounds were gunged. The show was still hosted by Pat Sharp with the aid of Melanie and Martina Grant.
