= MTV Hive =

- Website type: Music news and music video portal
- Owner: Viacom International
- Website: mtvhive.com
- Commercial: Yes
- Current status: Closed

MTV Music
- MTV Music

- MTV Music Logo and MTV Music main page as of 30 October 2008
- Website type: Former music/video sharing website
- Owner: MTV Networks (Viacom)
- Website: www.MTVMusic.com
- Commercial: Yes
- Registration: None
- Launched: October 28, 2008
- Current status: Closed

MTV Hive was MTV's online music video portal and its editorial mouthpiece for coverage of indie music genres, providing music news and music on-demand. It is the successor to the former MTV Music website in the United States, which was merged into MTV Hive as of January 2012. On October 31, 2013, MTV Hive tweeted that it was transforming into @MTVArtists, a Twitter feed. The MTV Hive web site has not been actively updated since December 2013, but MTV currently provides similar news and features in the music section of its main web site, at mtv.com/music. All content has been merged into MTV News and MTV Artists Platform.

== Historical background ==
MTV Music (also known as MTVM) was a music video and music sharing website launched on October 28, 2008 by MTV Networks. Since 2012, it has been merged with and redirected to the MTV Hive website.

The MTV Music website offered a large collection of music videos that dated back to the early 1980s. The library included more than 16,000 videos. According to Alexa as of October 30, 2008, in the two days from launch the site had over 75,000 hits.

The following is a list of the logos and icons used on the MTV Music website in alphabetical order.

- A-ha - "Take On Me"
- Beastie Boys - "Sabotage"
- Britney Spears - "...Baby One More Time"
- The Buggles - "Video Killed The Radio Star"
- Dire Straits - "Money for Nothing"
- Guns N' Roses - "Welcome to the Jungle"
- Lil Jon - "Get Low"
- Madonna - "Vogue"
- Metallica - "Enter Sandman"
- Michael Jackson - "Thriller"
- Nine Inch Nails - "Closer"
- Nirvana - "Smells Like Teen Spirit"
- Run-DMC - "Walk This Way"
