= Now 90s & 00s =

- Country: United Kingdom

Programming
- Language: English
- Picture format: 16:9 576i SDTV

Ownership
- Owner: Penny Street TV Ltd (Universal Music Group)
- Sister channels: Now 70s Now 80s Now Rock; Clubland TV

History
- Launched: 3 July 2024

Links
- Website: www.nowmusic.com

Now 90s & 00s is a British free-to-air channel that focuses on music from the 1990s and 2000s.

== History ==
In June 2024, Penny Street TV Ltd (Universal Music Group) were going to launch a new music channel called Now 90s & 00s which programmed 1990s and 2000s songs.

On 3 July 2024, Now 90s & 00s launched on Sky and Virgin Media. Now 90s & 00s brought back the Now 90s brand but it's a programming block on certain hours along with a new programming block called Now 00s which focuses on 2000s songs.

As of 2026, the Now 90s & 00s playlist has acquired some 2010s and 2020s programming across certain blocks.

=== Now Christmas ===
From 7 November until 27 December 2024, Now 90s & 00s was temporarily rebranded to Now Christmas for the festive season.

=== Samsung TV Plus ===
On 12 March 2025, Now 90s and 00s was added to the Samsung TV Plus line-up.

== Availability ==
Sky (UK): Channel 357

Virgin Media (UK): Channel 287
