= Free TV (Italy) =

- Country: Italy
- Broadcast area: Triveneto

Programming
- Language(s): Italian
- Picture format: 4:3 SDTV

Ownership
- Owner: T-Vision

Availability

Terrestrial
- Digital: LCN 17 (Friuli-Venezia Giulia)-644(Veneto)

Free TV is an Italian regional television channel of Friuli-Venezia Giulia owned by T-Vision. It transmits a light entertainment program: movies, news and weather bulletins on LCN 17.

Other channels of own group are Antenna 3 and Ada Channel.

The television broadcast in Triveneto and in western Slovenia.

== Programs in Italian ==
- Sportissimo
- Free tg
- Oasi di Salute
- 13
- La Piazza
- Meteo
- Parola alla Difesa
- Parliamone con Kira
- Info Tv
- Storie di famiglia
- Notes

== Staff ==
- Lorenzo Petiziol
