= MTV Rocks =

MTV Rocks may refer to:

- MTV Rocks (European TV channel)
- MTV Rocks (British and Irish TV channel)
