= MTV Artists Platform =

MTV Artists
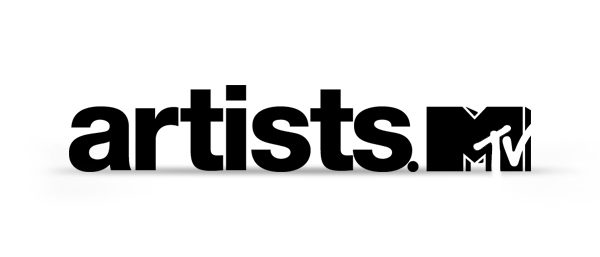
- Owner: Viacom Media Networks
- Commercial: Yes
- Launched: August 15, 2012; 14 years ago

MTV Artists was an online music portal, owned by Viacom, intended to generate traffic to web and video content owned by the company and give more opportunity to artists. It was initially launched in August 2012 in beta. With the artists platform any musician (indie to arena) could connect with fans through MTV, VH1, and CMT, both online and on-air. The service never made it out of beta, though the web pages have not been taken down, and are primarily populated with third party meta-data, instead of MTV original content. Features allowing artists to upload their music were removed from the site after launch.

== History ==
In 2008 MTV Networks had launched their first online music hub, meant for sharing music videos and generating ad revenue, MTV Music (also known as MTVM). MTV Music offered a large collection of music videos that dated back to the early 1980s. The library once included more than 16,000 videos, although many of these were subsequently removed from the site, as major music companies demanded significant compensation for their use.

MTV Music was merged with MTV Hive in January 2012. MTV Hive was an editorial website for coverage of indie music genres. MTV had later quit their editorial music blogs (MTV Hive and MTV Buzzworthy) to focus on bringing more content to the online MTV News blog. On October 31, 2013, MTV Hive tweeted that it was transforming into @MTVArtists, a Twitter feed.

Today MTV Artists hub houses the music videos from Warner Music Group and third-party content from Vevo. Anybody can search any artist and browse through the MTV collection of live performances, artists interviews, and other music related content created by MTV, VH1, and CMT. The application also relies on The Echo Nest and Gracenote for its music content.

According to the Mashable website, the MTV Artists Platform was developed to allow artists who did not have an MTV profile to generate their own content.

=== CMT Artists ===
Viacom had released a special version of the mobile app branded by CMT, it features curated country music news, music, and artists.

== Artists Connect ==
Artists can claim their own MTV artists page by signing up. Artists can connect using Facebook and Twitter. They used to be able to also post their own music videos, MP3s, photos, and other video content, although that feature was later abandoned. Fans can donate money to artists through tip jars.

=== Some artist pages ===
| Adele; Alicia Keys; Beach House; Beyoncé; Gotye; Imagine Dragons; Jack White; Jennifer Lopez; Katy Perry; K'naan; Lionel Richie; Lil Wayne | Local Natives; Maroon 5; Martin Solveig; Mashkook; P!nk; Pixies; Surfer Blood; The Wanted; Young the Giant; Zac Brown Band |
