= Floorfillers =

Compilation album by various artists
- Released: August 3, 2004
- Genre: Trance; techno; house
- Label: UMTV

Floorfillers chronology
Floorfillers (2004)	Floorfillers 2 (2004)

Floorfillers is a dance album compilation brand by All Around the World Records (in association with UMTV) that has evolved from a range of separate compilations that AATW used to compile for a number of Northern radio stations in Emap's Big City Hits network. Even though these albums would feature many of the same tracks (by acts such as Porn Kings and N-Trance), each one would be tailored for the local market and would be branded under the station name (such as Radio City 96.7, Key 103 or Red Rose Rock FM) and in association with the region's premiere discotheque.

The first album, Floorfillers – 40 Massive Hits from the Clubs, was released in March 2004. It went to number one on the official UK Albums Chart. The second, Floorfillers 2 followed in late September 2004 and peaked at number three. Two more, Floorfillers 3 and Floorfillers 4, were released in 2005. Floorfillers – Club Classics was released in 2006, Floorfillers Anthems in 2007, Floorfillers 08 in October 2008, and Floorfillers 2010 was released on November 30, 2009.

In 2011, EMI and Universal released Ultimate Floorfillers, which reached the top of the dance compilation charts from January through the first week of May that year.
