= Vintage TV =

Vintage TV may refer to:

- Vintage TV (Canada), a Canadian music television channel
- Vintage TV (TV channel), a music television channel which was available in the UK, Canada and Ireland
- Vintage Television, a Philippine sports-oriented media company
- In2TV, a US television channel which has a 'TV Category' called Vintage TV
