= Desert Heat (hip-hop) =

Uniter Arab Emirates hip hop group

Desert Heat is an Arab hip hop group from the United Arab Emirates. Formed in late 2002, Desert Heat consists of two Emirati brothers Illmiyah and Arableak.

== Discography ==
Album: When The Desert Speaks

Track listing

1. Inta Wishlak
2. Waynkom
3. Naar
4. Jumeirah Thug
5. Keep It Desert
6. Dubai My City
7. Test Me
8. Terror Alert
9. When The Desert Speaks
10. Future Shock
11. Did You Know
12. Al Khatima
13. Fakkir
14. Arabi 4 Life
15. Under Her Feet
