= Now 70s =

British TV music channel, formerly known as Channel U and Channel AKA

NOW 70s
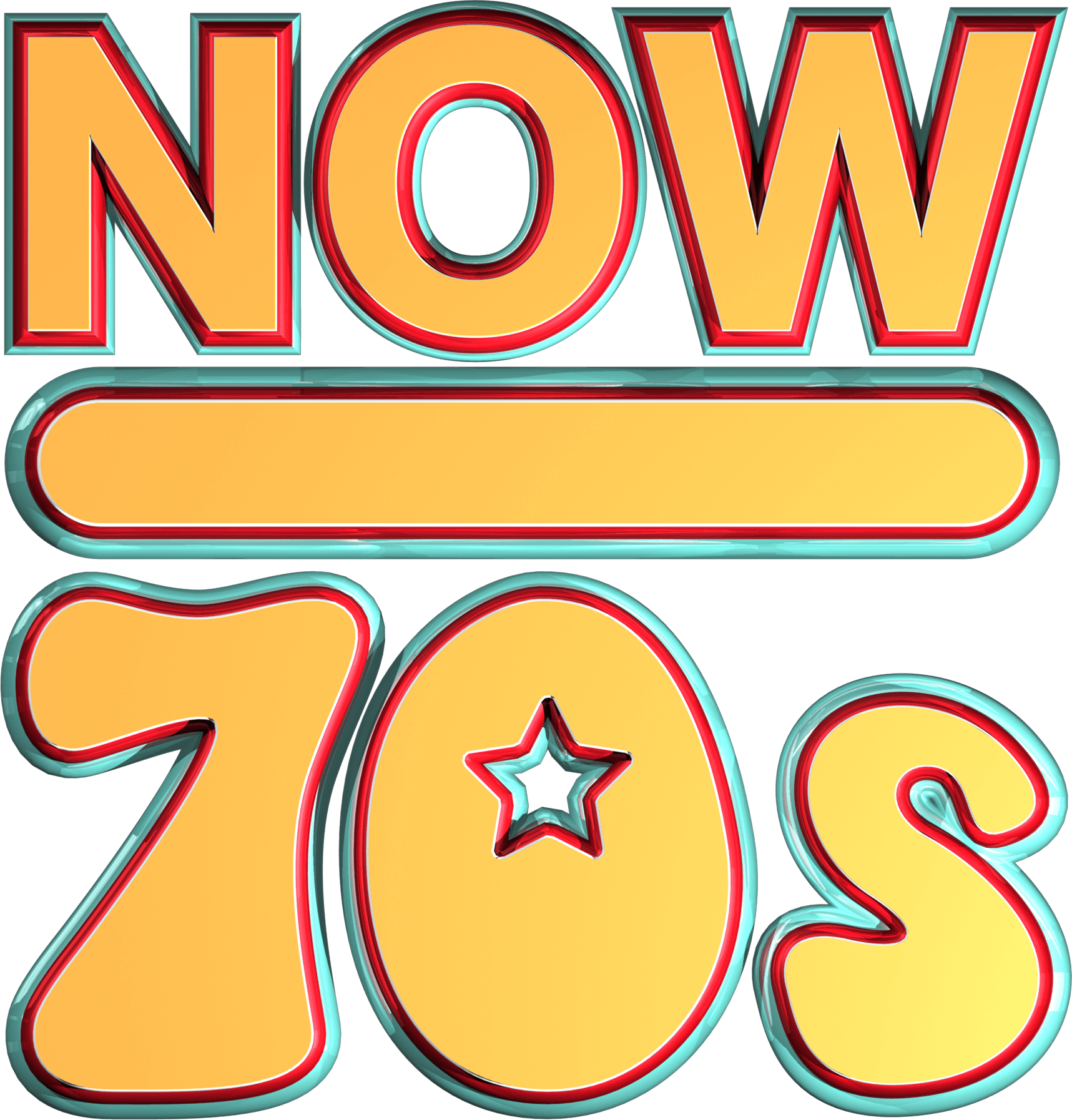
- Used on Sky and Virgin Media UK’s TV guide

Programming
- Picture format: 16:9 576i SDTV

Ownership
- Owner: Penny Street (Universal Music Group)
- Sister channels: Now 80s Now 90s & 00s Now Rock; Clubland TV

History
- Launched: 3 March 2003
- Former names: Channel U (2003–09); Channel AKA (2009–18); Massive R&B (2018); Total Country (2018–19)

Links
- Website: www.nowmusic.com

Now 70s (formerly Channel U, Channel AKA, Massive R&B and Total Country) is a British free-to-air music television channel, owned by All Around the World Productions, available through Sky UK, Freeview and Virgin Media within the UK and through Local Now within the US (since February 2026, the US version is a rebadged channel known as That's 70s, with its interstitial hosts removed). It focuses on music from the 1970s, being the third decade-oriented channel in the Now portfolio, along with Now 80s and Now 90s & 00s.

== History ==
=== Channel U ===
Channel U was a British digital satellite TV music channel that focused on the British grime scene which ran from February 2003 to June 2018. It was a significant outlet not only for established artists, but also for those who are just starting out, helping the breakthrough for acts such as Tinchy Stryder, Tinie Tempah, Dizzee Rascal, Chip, Wretch 32, Devlin, Giggs, Skepta, N-Dubz and even Ed Sheeran. Its material "included crude productions shot with handheld digital video cameras," and helps new musicians attract attention and build a fan base. According to its website, "the aim of the channel was to highlight to the public, the raw and unsigned talent we have in the UK, and give them a platform from which they could perform".

=== Channel AKA ===
Channel AKA: 16 March 2009 - 11 April 2014

Channel AKA: 11 April 2014 - 1 June 2018

The parent company of Fizz TV and Channel U went into voluntary liquidation at the beginning of February, 2009, before being purchased by Mushroom TV. When purchasing the two channels, Mushroom TV agreed that Channel U and Fizz TV should be rebranded. The two channels were rebranded as Channel AKA and Starz TV on 16 March 2009.

On 22 June 2012, Mushroom TV entered liquidation. Ofcom's television broadcast licensing update for May 2012, indicates that Channel AKA was sold to All Around the World Productions, who at the time owned Clubland TV and Massive R&B (now Now 90s) and had also acquired Greatest Hits TV under UltimateHits Limited. On 29 November 2012, the channel launched on Freesat but was removed on 15 April 2013. The channel returned to Freesat on 1 October 2015 alongside its sister channels Chilled TV, Clubland TV and Now Music, before being removed again on 12 May 2017.

Channel AKA and its predecessor Channel U have since been remembered for introducing the music careers of artists such as Dizzee Rascal, Kano, Wiley and Lethal Bizzle.

=== Massive R&B ===
Massive R&B logo

On 1 June 2018, Channel AKA's slot was replaced with Massive R&B. (the second time an All Around the World owned network has used the name), now focusing on celebrating classic hip-hop & R&B from the 1990s and 2000s, and current urban music - from US rap to UK grime. (Note: As read on the Sky guide when choosing a favourite channel)

=== Total Country ===
Total Country logo

On 1 November 2018, five months after Massive R&B relaunched, it was rebranded as a country music channel called Total Country, celebrating country music, old and new, from Dolly Parton and Garth Brooks to Carrie Underwood, Ward Thomas and The Shires.

The channel launched on Virgin Media on 8 March 2019, along with sister channel Now 90s. It was previously available via the red button on Clubland TV on the platform along with Now 80s and Now 90s until it was removed on 1 March 2018.

From 20 November 2019 until 27 December 2019, Now 80s used Total Country's slot since the slot that is normally used for Now 80s was used for Now Christmas, efficiently ceasing the channel's broadcast in the process.

=== Now 70s ===
On 27 December 2019, the channel was rebranded as Now 70s, becoming the third decade-oriented channel in the Now-branded portfolio.

On 26 February 2020, the channel launched on Freeview on channel 78, replacing Now 90s. It was removed from the platform on 26 May 2020, coinciding with Together increasing its broadcast hours, and returned on 8 July 2020 as an exclusive to Manchester on channel 78 and via Channelbox on channel 271 (connected TVs only). On 28 April 2021, it returned to Freeview outside Manchester on channel 76, replacing Now 80s, which became exclusive to Manchester.

As well as various chart shows (with former Radio 1 DJs like Mark Goodier and Bruno Brookes) and artist battles (such as Bowie vs Bolan, or ABBA vs Boney M.) based upon the music of the 1970s, the channel also features music from the 1960s in their Now 70s presents Now 60s programming block, in a similar fashion to how Now 80s had a 1970s programme block prior to the launch of Now 70s as a standalone channel.

On 23 February 2022, it was confirmed that Now 70s and the other three AATW channels would launch on Sky Glass in the future, although a specific launch date was not given.

On 20 September 2022, Now 70s closed on Freeview.

On 2 March 2023, Now 70s reappeared on Freeview as a FAST channel on Channelbox channel 271 alongside Now 80s and Now Rock.

From 28 November until 27 December 2023, Now 70s was rebranded temporarily as Now Christmas for the 2023 festive season.

== Presenters ==
DJs hired in the 2020s to present shows for the channel and record voice-over links include:

- Pat Sharp
- Simon Bates
- Mark Goodier
- Tony Blackburn
- David Jensen
- Robin Banks

== Criticisms ==
In June 2005, the then Channel U was fined £18,000 by Ofcom for a number of offences, including the broadcasting of inappropriate material, using premium rate telephone services in programmes, and failing to ensure a clear distinction between programmes and advertisements.

== See also ==
- 1970s nostalgia
