= Clubland TV =

UK dance music channel

- Country: United Kingdom

Programming
- Language: English
- Picture format: 16:9 576i SDTV

Ownership
- Owner: Penny Street TV Ltd (Universal Music Group)
- Sister channels: Now 70s; Now 80s; Now 90s & 00s; Now Rock

History
- Launched: 28 January 2008

Links
- Website: aatw.com

Clubland TV is a British satellite free-to-air, cable and subscription Dance/Electronica genre music channel. It is based from the Clubland compilation albums. Clubland TV airs various sub-genres of dance/EDM from the mid 80s to 2025, such as electronica, techno, trance, Eurodance, house, garage & dance-pop. Clubland TV is channel 354 on Sky, and channel 292 on Virgin. Clubland TV is available on the Astra 2G satellite network, on the Ku band.

== History ==
The channel launched on 28 January 2008. As of March 2008, the channel had five times the viewing ratings than its main competition MTV Dance. As of July 2019, the channel still dominates the ratings over its main rival MTV Dance (now Club MTV) that was closed on 20 July 2020, making Clubland TV the only UK-based dance channel until the launch of That's Dance.

The channel was initially run in partnership with Mushroom TV Ltd, former operator of Channel AKA and Starz TV, as this company had an established system for the operation of viewer-voted music channels. On 17 February 2010 Clubland's broadcasting was changed to a brand new, bespoke playout facility. The text number for song voting changed as did some song voting codes, and the channel is now broadcast in 16:9 widescreen format (having been in 4:3 fullscreen during the Mushroom era.) The channel is now solely controlled (including all playout and technical support services) by the team behind the highly successful Clubland compilation album series.

From January 2014 the channel has been available to stream on mobile devices via TVPlayer. From July 2014 Clubland TV has its own app available on the Google Play Store for Android devices and the App Store for Apple devices where viewers can request videos to be played on the channel.

On 30 April 2015, as part of a music reshuffle, Clubland TV was removed from Freesat, at the request of its operators. It returned along with its sister channels on 1 October 2015 (but was removed on 14 September 2016 along with Chilled TV).

On 12 January 2016, Clubland TV was picked up by Virgin Media. It was originally featured with sister channels Channel AKA (later Now 70s), Now Music (later Now 80s) and Chilled TV (later Now 90s), until Channel AKA was removed in March 2018. The app on Clubland closed on Virgin Media in January 2019.

In August 2016, the channel got a licence to launch on Freeview. It launched on 6 September 2016, in Manchester only, but later was put on channel 271 via streaming service Channelbox along with sister channel Now 90s, now known as Now Rock.

On 9 September 2016, Clubland TV launched changed their on screen graphics. It is one of the few UK music channels to feature an on-screen clock informing viewers of the current time. These on screen graphics were used from 2016 to 2022.

On 20 November 2020, the channel was temporarily renamed "Channel U" for six hours to promote the film Against All Odds.

On 27 October 2021, the on-screen clock was removed from Clubland TV. It returned some time later and as of January 2024 remains on-screen.

On 23 February 2022, it was confirmed that Clubland TV and the other three AATW channels would launch on Sky Glass in the future, although a specific launch date was not given.

On 31 May 2022, Clubland TV launched new on-screen graphics and a modified logo, featuring a blue, white and pink colour, with the first song being played following the rebrand being 2 Unlimited's 'No Limit'. Clubland TV also gained a sponsor, FreePrints.

Logo used from 9 June, 2022 to 27 December, 2025

On 17 June 2022, Clubland TV once again changed their On-Screen Graphics, this time to include a new, bolder font.

As of 2022, Clubland TV's playout consists entirely of Old-School dance, the channel formerly focused on a mix of Old-School and brand new Dance, EDM and K-Pop. The channel does, however, occasionally play music from the 2010s.

On 26 October 2022, Clubland TV was delisted from Manchester local community Freeview, due to national expansion on cable and satellite.

In 2 July 2024, Clubland TV reintroduced music from the 2020s.

Recently, as of 27 December 2025, the format of the channel has changed with a change of font and how the song name and programme information appear.

== Now Christmas ==
From 11 November until 27 December 2025, Clubland TV was rebrand temporarily as Now Christmas for the 2025 Christmas season. In previous years, Now 90s & 00s had been utilised as the host of the annual Christmas channel. It returned on 17 November 2026.
