= Now Rock =

- Country: United Kingdom

Programming
- Language(s): English
- Picture format: 16:9 576i SDTV

Ownership
- Owner: Penny Street TV Ltd (Universal Music Group)
- Sister channels: Now 70s Now 80s Now 90s & 00s Clubland TV

History
- Launched: 23 November 2010
- Former names: WTF (2010–11); Massive R&B (2011–13); Planet Pop (2013–15); Chilled TV (2015–17); Chilled 90s (2017); Now 90s (2017–2022)

Links
- Website: www.nowmusic.com

Now Rock is a British free-to-air music television channel, focusing exclusively on playing rock music for 10 months of the year, with a sister channel called Now 90s featuring rock hits from the 1990s available in other territories. For the other two months, Now Christmas takes over with their Christmas service not only playing hits from the 1990s.

The channel originally launched on 23 November 2010 as WTF (Weekly Top Forty).

It reaches a million viewers in Sky alone each month. The channel is only allowed to have two ad-breaks an hour.

== History ==
=== WTF (Weekly Top Forty) ===
When the channel originally launched as WTF, the channel used a video jukebox format which allowed viewers to select videos by texting the video selection number to the number on the screen. There were different selection playlists during different times of the day.

=== Massive R&B ===
On 15 August 2011, WTF was rebranded as Massive R&B and, as the channel's name applies, changed its focus to R&B music.

On 20 September 2011, the channel launched on Freesat, having previously only been available on Sky. It moved to 511 in September 2012.

Many years after the name being unused, Massive R&B would be reused again as a rebrand of Channel AKA from 1 June 2018 until 1 November 2018, when it became Total Country.

=== Planet Pop and Planet (TV channel) ===
On 27 March 2013, the channel was rebranded as Planet Pop, with programming aimed at a core audience of 16 to 24-year-olds, including The Planet Pop 40 and Party-On Planet Pop.

From 13 October 2015 until January 18, 2016, Planet Pop returned as simply "Planet" on Sky channel 389.

=== Chilled TV and Chilled 90s ===
On 9 September 2015, the channel was rebranded as Chilled TV, which featured laidback and acoustic songs.

From 18 November until 26 December 2016, Chilled TV was temporarily rebranded as Chilled Xmas.

On 31 March 2017, Chilled TV was rebranded as Chilled 90s, following the success of Now 80s, and eventually temporary renamed to Now Christmas on 10 November 2017.

=== Now 90s ===
After the success of Now Christmas, the channel was renamed to Now 90s on 27 December 2017, changing its focus onto music from the 1990s and occasionally shows adverts for previous Now albums that were released in the 1990s.

In November 2017, Now 80s and Now 90s (then broadcasting as Now Christmas) were added to the GMAN Freeview multiplex broadcasting to Greater Manchester. The channel launched on Virgin Media on 8 March 2019, along with sister channel Total Country. It was previously available via the red button on Clubland TV on the platform along with Now 80s and Total Country (then Channel AKA).

In June 2018 availability of Now 80s was extended to Freeview HD owners in more parts of the country by relocating to the Arqiva COM8 multiplex. Now 90s continued to broadcast to Manchester only, until 26 February 2019, when it was relocated to the COM8 multiplex. However, in August 2019 the channel was taken off-air on Freeview, with a placeholder note being added, a couple of weeks later, to say that the channel should be broadcasting again on 1 October 2019.

On 1 October 2019, Now 90s came back to Freeview as a channel streaming through connected TVs for the majority of the day. However, in order to keep a channel number near to Now 80s or Clubland TV (so not to be placed next to Channelbox in the streaming section lower down in the EPG) the channel has to broadcast over the terrestrial Freeview system for at least two hours a day and so can be found from 05:00–07:00 on non-streaming devices. It was removed from there on 26 February 2020, and replaced with sister channel Now 70s. It was put on Channelbox alongside Clubland TV before returning to the Greater Manchester multiplex on 13 May 2020, where it could be found on channel 84.

From 19 November to 27 December 2020, Now 90s temporarily rebranded as Now 80s while the usual slot Now 80s is on was used for Now Christmas, in a similar change to how Total Country rebranded as Now 80s for the festive period the previous year before the rebrand to Now 70s after Christmas. This was repeated from 18 November 2021. As Now 80s became a channel which only viewers in Greater Manchester could get on Freeview during this time, AATW decided to simulcast the repeats of 1980s series Fame on their Now Christmas channel as well, so viewers nationwide could continue to follow the series.

On 26 October 2022, NOW 90s was delisted from Manchester local Freeview.

On 9 November 2022, NOW 90s ended its run under its then-current name, at approximately 03:25. The final video to be played on NOW 90s was LL Cool J's "Ain't Nobody". The station flipped to a Christmas music format, Now Xmas.

A branded Now 90s channel continues to broadcast on Samsung TV Plus in Australia and New Zealand, which launched in May 2021.

=== Now Rock ===
On 27 December 2022, the channel was rebranded as Now Rock, with a change of focus to rock music. On 2 March 2023, Now 90s reappeared on Freeview as a FAST channel on Channelbox channel 271 alongside Now 70s and Now 80s. On 19 March 2023, the broadcast feed for Channelbox was switched from Now 90s to the Now Rock channel already transmitting on other platforms in the United Kingdom. Unlike the later version of Now 90s streaming via Channelbox, Now Rock includes pop-punk tunes from the 2000s and 2010s as well as classic rock hits from the 60s, 70s and 80s, in addition to rock music from the 1990s.

On 1 July 2024, following the closure of Kerrang! TV, Now Rock revamped its schedule to focus more on music from the 1990s onward, with almost all classic rock-themed programmes removed from its schedule.

== On-air identity ==
Planet Pop: 27 March 2013 – 9 September 2015
