= Now 80s =

NOW 80s
- Country: United Kingdom

Programming
- Language: English
- Picture format: 16:9 576i SDTV

Ownership
- Owner: Penny Street TV Ltd (Universal Music Group)
- Sister channels: Now 70s Now 90s & 00s Now Rock; Clubland TV

History
- Launched: 23 October 2013
- Replaced: Greatest Hits TV
- Former names: Now Music TV (2013–2016)

Links
- Website: nowchannels.co.uk

NOW 80s is a British free-to-air music television channel, focusing exclusively on playing music from the 1980s. The channel launched in its current form on 27 December 2016, initially as a temporary pop-up rebrand of Now Music, previously a contemporary pop channel. The 80s format was subsequently made permanent.

== History ==
In October 2013, Greatest Hits TV was replaced with a channel based on the Now That's What I Call Music! compilation brand, marking the 30th anniversary year of the Now series. The new channel played a mix of current/contemporary and classic pop hits, broadcasting strands such as Britain's Hit 40.

In the run-up to Christmas each year, Now Music would flip to a Christmas music format under the name NOW Christmas, with the temporary suspension of the normal contemporary output (in 2012, Greatest Hits TV became "Christmas Hits TV").

Following the Christmas 2016 run of NOW Christmas, rather than return to the usual format as in prior years, Now Music instead transitioned on 27 December to carry solely 1980s music, under the banner of "NOW 80s". It was initially thought this would be temporary, and that the previous NOW Music would resume in early 2017, but the success of the 1980s format saw this retained indefinitely. Following the success of NOW 80s, sister channel Chilled TV was retooled as 1990s music station Chilled 90s from March 2017; this channel was then used for NOW Christmas in 2017 (allowing the Christmas format and the 80s station to run simultaneously), before fully rebranded as NOW 90s from 27 December 2017. From 20 November to 26 December 2018, NOW 80s was rebranded temporarily as NOW Christmas, and was repeated again in 2019 while NOW 80s moved to the slot formerly used by Total Country, and a similar change happened in 2020 with NOW 80s moving to the slot usually used by NOW 90s.

From 9 until 16 October 2020, NOW 80s rebranded temporarily as LENNON80 to mark what would've been John Lennon's 80th birthday.

On 7 November 2021, Now 80s started to show American TV series Fame from the beginning of season one in 1982, with three back-to-back episodes shown on Thursday nights and a repeat on Sunday mornings.

A week later, Now 80s was swapped with Now 90s in order to broadcast Now Christmas to the whole of the UK on channel 76 (if viewers have televisions that already receive Freeview Play or high-definition broadcasts) over the festive period, with Now 80s continuing for viewers in Greater Manchester on channel 78. As Now 80s became a channel which only viewers in Manchester could get on Freeview during this time, AATW decided to simulcast the repeats of Fame on their Now Christmas channel so viewers nationwide could follow the series.

== Carriage ==
In November 2017, NOW 80s and NOW 90s (then broadcasting as NOW Christmas) were added to the GMAN Freeview multiplex broadcasting to Greater Manchester. In June 2018 availability of NOW 80s was extended to Freeview HD owners in more parts of the country by relocating to the Arqiva COM8 multiplex. Now 90s continued to broadcast to Manchester only, until 26 February 2019, when it was relocated to the COM8 multiplex. On 28 April 2021, the channel got demoted back to the GMAN multiplex, swapping places with Now 70s.

In July 2018, around the same time as the UKTV network of channels was being removed from Virgin Media, the cable platform added NOW 80s as a discrete channel adjacent to Clubland TV on the guide; for some time previously, NOW 80s and other AATW channels had been available to Virgin TiVo boxes as internet-streamed services accessed behind the red button via Clubland.

On 22 September 2022, Now 80s was added as a streamed channel to Samsung TV Plus, which can be accessed on most Samsung TVs, Smartphones and Tablets, on channel 4717. There is a possibility that the other Now Channels and Clubland TV will soon follow.

On 26 October 2022, NOW 80s was delisted from Manchester local Freeview.

On 2 March 2023, Now 80s reappeared on Freeview as a FAST channel on Channelbox channel 271 alongside Now 70s and Now Rock.

Now 80s is available in the United States through Local Now, the free ad-supported streaming television service owned by Allen Media Group. Since February 2026, this version has been rebadged as That's 80s, with the same playlist but no interstitial programs.

== Programming ==
Apart from episodes of the 1980s American drama Fame (billed as Fame – The Original TV Series on the channel's EPG), the channel usually sticks to a back-to-back video format with radio presenters including Pat Sharp, Mark Goodier and Simon Bates presenting, appearing either as a voice-over or on-screen. Bates has continued to present his old radio feature The Golden Hour as a programme on Now 80s, with some episodes billed as Simon Bates' New Golden Hour and others appearing on Now 70s. In addition to a number of former BBC Radio 1 disc jockeys, the channel has featured many popstars from the era, such as T'Pau's Carol Decker, presenting the video countdowns.

The channel has also created a number of programmes to tie-in with the release of the Now Yearbook series of 4-CD and 3-LP vinyl sets. Each album release represents a year of music, with the Now Yearbook programme following suit and featuring a month by month video playlist of tracks, from the year featured on the Now Yearbook album, with Bruno Brookes presenting.

== Logos ==
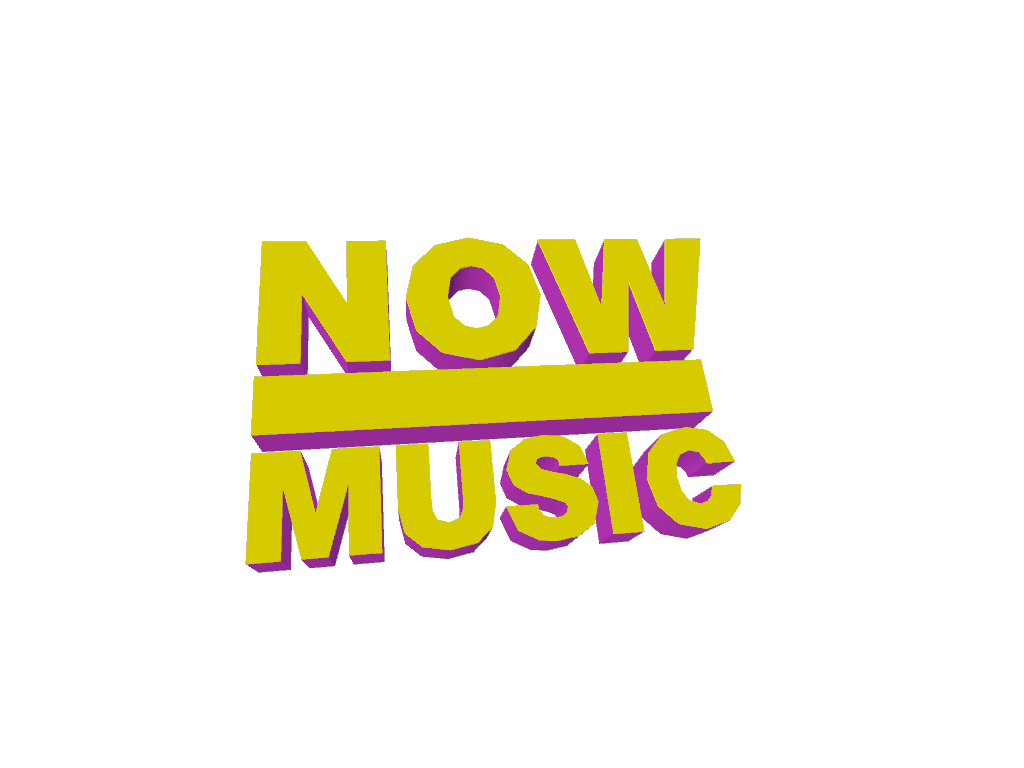
NOW Music TV logo used 2013-2016

NOW 80s logo used 2016-2023
