= Timeline of 5 (British TV channel) =

This is a timeline of the history of British television network 5.

== 1980s ==
- 1987
  - Two separate government studies identify spare frequency space on the UHF band, prompting political debate about the viability of a fifth UK terrestrial TV channel.
- 1988
  - A government white paper on broadcasting includes provisions for a fifth channel after Booz Allen Consultants recommends it as an option. Booz Allen claims the extra channel would reduce the current ITV monopoly and also reduce advertising costs.
- 1989
  - March – The Independent Broadcasting Authority recommends that the headquarters of a fifth channel should be situated outside London, preferably at a location north of Birmingham.

== 1990s ==
- 1990
  - The terms of a licence for a fifth channel are set out in the Broadcasting Act 1990. It would need to be a general entertainment channel with a remit for some public service broadcasting. Additionally, it is estimated that the channel's coverage would reach only 74% of the UK, and a video retuning operation would need to be undertaken.
- 1991
  - No events.
- 1992
  - 14 April – The Independent Television Commission (ITC) issues an invitation to apply for the Channel 5 licence.
  - 3 July – Columbia TriStar and Canwest, two backers of the four strong Channel 5 Holdings Ltd consortium, withdraw their support for the project, leaving Thames Television, which is proposing a network of city-TV stations, and Canadian businessman Moses Znaimer to take the project forward. As Channel 5 Holdings are the only current bidders for the Channel 5 licence there are concerns for the future of the process ahead of the deadline, but Channel 5 Holdings says it intends to put forward its bid as planned.
  - 7 July – Date of the initial deadline for applications to run the Channel 5 service. One application to run the channel is submitted by Channel 5 Holdings Ltd.
  - December – The ITC rejects the Channel 5 Holdings Ltd bid amid concerns about its business plan and investor commitment. and subsequently considers not awarding the licence at all.
- 1993
  - July – The ITC publishes the findings of a technical review.
  - October – More than 70 parties respond to the publication of the technical review, including some expressing interest in running Channel 5 should the licence be readvertised.
- 1994
  - February – The ITC announces that it plans to readvertise the Channel 5 broadcasting licence, but it also has to seek confirmation that the frequencies it planned to allocate to the channel are still available.
  - 14 July – Stephen Dorrell, the Secretary of State for Heritage announces that Channel 35, one of the two frequencies planned for use by a fifth channel, will not be available. The ITC expresses concern over this, but still views Channel 5 as a viable option since 60% of the UK will still be covered by the remaining frequency.
  - 15 September – The ITC announces its decision to re-advertise the Channel 5 licence.
  - 1 November – A second attempt to license the fifth terrestrial channel begins and several companies apply.
- 1995
  - 2 May – Closing date for applications to run Channel 5. Four bids are received, from New Century TV Ltd (British Sky Broadcasting, Goldman Sachs, Granada Group, Hoare Govett, Kinnevik, Polygram, Really Useful Group and TCI International) who bid £2,000,000; Virgin TV Ltd with a bid of £22,002,000; UKTV (CanWest Global Communications Corp., Scandinavian Broadcast System SA, SelectTV Plc, The Ten Group Ltd) who bid £36,261,158 and Channel 5 Broadcasting Ltd (MAI (now United News and Media Plc), CLT/UFA, Pearson Plc, Warburg Pincus & Co) with a bid of £22,002,000.
  - 20 October – Channel 5 Broadcasting Limited is awarded the licence. It is a consortium of four investors — Pearson, United News and Media, CLT-Ufa and Warburg Pincus.
  - 22 November – After Virgin TV challenges the ITC's decision to award the licence to run the UK's fifth television channel to Channel 5 Broadcasting Ltd, the High Court grants leave for a judicial review into the decision.
- 1996
  - 26 January – The findings of the judicial review of the ITC's licence awarding process are published. The review finds that there was no illegality or unfairness in the awarding of the licence to Channel 5 Broadcasting Ltd.
  - 18 April – The ITC confirms the awarding of the Channel 5 licence to Channel 5 Broadcasting Ltd, setting out its broadcasting remit. 50% of programming must be original, while there are quotas for the amount of public service programming that must be aired.
  - Channel 5 retunes the UK's video recorders to avoid interference with video recorders which use the same frequencies as those allocated to Channel 5.
  - Engineering transmission tests are carried out at some sites.

Logo used from 30 March 1997 to 15 September 2002

- 1997
  - 2 January – Test transmissions begin for Channel 5 in some areas. Details of these are made available on Ceefax page 698 for a few weeks.
  - 31 January – Details of Channel 5's schedule are leaked to Broadcast magazine. A spokeswoman for the channel confirms the schedule is largely accurate but that the amount of imported content has been distorted; Channel 5's schedule will be made up of 70% UK-produced content.
  - 12 February – Channel 5 releases details of its programme scheduling. It will introduce the concept of stripping and stranding to British television, stripping being where a programme is shown at the same time each day, and stranding being where similar programmes are shown at the same time each day. A full schedule is published on 18 February.
  - 30 March
    - Channel 5 launches at 6 pm with the Spice Girls singing a cover version of Manfred Mann's hit "5-4-3-2-1" as "1-2-3-4-5". Around 65% of the UK is able to receive the channel.
    - Channel 5's soap opera Family Affairs makes its debut.
    - Late night talk show The Jack Docherty Show makes its debut.
  - 31 March
    - Channel 5 launches its overnight coverage of American sports when it broadcasts the first edition of Live & Dangerous. The programme broadcasts on weekdays through the night and includes live coverage of American sport as well as highlights from America and other global sports events. The first programme features the opening day of the 1997 Major League Baseball season.
    - Pre-school brand Milkshake! launches as a breakfast television block.
    - The first edition of 5 News is broadcast with Kirsty Young perching on the edge of a desk in a bid to present the news in a more informal way. The channel also provides hourly news updates on weekdays on the hour, every hour.
    - The first episode of the game show 100% is broadcast.
  - 23 April – Channel 5 launches on satellite so that the third of the UK who live outside of its broadcast area can view the newly launched channel.
  - 31 May – Even though Channel 5 had said that it hadn't been intending to show live sport at peak time, it buys the rights to one of England's qualifying matches for the 1998 World Cup – an away match against Poland.
  - Summer – Channel 5 launches on the Astra satellite in a bid to reach the third of UK homes which cannot receive the channel.
  - Autumn – Football on 5 becomes a regular fixture as the channel purchases rights to UEFA Cup games and other away qualifying matches involving the home nations, showing the latter for the next decade.
- 1998
  - March – MLB on Five launches when Channel 5 decides to create a specific programme for its coverage of Major League Baseball.
  - 15 November – The launch of OnDigital allows the channel to be broadcast across the UK via digital terrestrial television.
- 1999
  - 23 June – Channel 5 axes the late night talk show The Jack Docherty Show. It had been struggling in recent times with fewer programmes broadcast each week due to low viewing figures.
  - 22 November – Channel 5 begins simulcasting Euronews, airing the channel daily between 5am and 6am, but the simulcast only lasts for two months and ends on 23 January 2000.

== 2000s ==
- 2000
  - May – The licence to run Channel 5's teletext service is awarded to Teletext Ltd and is valid for ten years from 1 July 2002.
  - 11 September – Channel 5 launches a morning topical talk show called The Wright Stuff.
- 2001
  - 16 July – Channel 5 starts showing Australian soap opera Home and Away after acquiring the rights from ITV the previous year.
  - 19 December – BSkyB has signed a deal with Channel 5 that will allow its breakfast show, Sky News Sunrise to be shown on the channel from 6am to 6:30am on weekdays and 7am to 8am at weekends. The programme will appear on Channel 5 from 7 January 2002 and will be the first time Sky News content has been seen on terrestrial television for a decade.
  - 24 December – The final episode of 100% is broadcast.

Logo used from 16 September 2002 to 5 October 2008

- 2002
  - 5 August – The first episode of BrainTeaser is broadcast.
  - 16 September – Channel 5 is rebranded as Five and the permanent digital on-screen graphic is removed.
- 2003
  - Weekday afternoon lifestyle chat show Open House with Gloria Hunniford is axed as part of a revamp of the daytime schedule.
- 2004
  - 27 February – Reports emerge of discussions between Channel 4 and Five aimed at a merger between the two channels.
  - 17 November – It is reported that merger talks between Channel 4 and Five have been called off after complexities arose between the public broadcaster Channel 4 and its commercial counterpart.
- 2005
  - 1 January – Sky News takes over the contract to provide Five's news service from ITN. The first scheduled Sky produced news programme had been due to air on 3 January, but two shorter bulletins for 1 and 2 January were hastily added to provide updates following the Indian Ocean tsunami on Boxing Day 2004.
  - 18 November – It is announced that Five had bought a stake in DTT's pay-TV operator, Top Up TV. It is said that the investment may lead to the development of new free and pay services on DTT and other platforms.
  - 30 December – The final edition of soap opera Family Affairs is broadcast. The series ends after eight years and 2,285 episodes.
- 2006
  - May – Five becomes the new terrestrial home of highlights of England cricket's home matches. It had been the only bidder for the rights.
  - 15 October – Five Life launches.
  - 16 October – Five US launches.
- 2007
  - 7 March – The final episode of BrainTeaser is broadcast.
  - 28 August – Timeshift channels of Five US and Five Life launch on Sky.

Logo used from 6 October 2008 to 13 February 2011

- 2008
  - 11 February – Five becomes the new UK home of Australian soap opera Neighbours.
  - 28 April – Five Life is renamed Fiver.
  - 29 October – MLB on Five comes to an end as part of cost-cutting measures which sees the beginning of the end of the channel broadcasting live overnight coverage of American sport.
- 2009
  - 16 February – Five US is rebranded Five USA.
  - September – Five becomes the lead broadcaster of the UEFA Europa League meaning it can show the entire tournament, including the final. Previously it had only been able to show the early rounds due to the BBC or ITV having the rights from the quarter-finals onwards.
  - 14 September – Entertainment news and chat show Live from Studio Five makes its debut.

== 2010s ==
- 2010
  - Five ends its live overnight coverage of American sport, when it decides to end its coverage of American football.
  - 13 July – Five's HD service launches on Sky and Virgin Media.
  - 23 July – Northern & Shell purchases Five for £103.5 million.

Logo used from 2011 to 2016

- 2011
  - 4 February – The final edition of Live from Studio Five is broadcast. It is immediately replaced by OK! TV which itself ends at the end of the year.
  - 14 February – Five returns to its original name of Channel 5.
  - 7 March
    - Fiver is rebranded as 5*
    - Five USA is rebranded 5USA.
  - 18 August – Channel 5 becomes the new home of Big Brother.
  - 8 November – ITN confirms it has secured a five-year contract to resume production of 5 News from early 2012. The broadcaster lost the programme to Sky News in 2005. Part of the new deal will see the 7pm bulletin move to an earlier 6:30pm timeslot.
  - 6 December – Channel 5 +1 launches on Freesat, Freeview and Sky.
- 2012
  - 20 February – ITN regains the contract to provide Channel 5's news coverage from Sky News.
  - 28 July – Football on 5 ends after the channel stops showing live football following the transfer of the UEFA Europa League to ITV.
  - 25 October – 5 +1 launches on Virgin Media.
- 2013
  - 28 August – UK debut of the Australian prison drama Wentworth on Channel 5. The opening episode of the Prisoner Cell Block H reboot attracts an audience of 2.4 million.
  - October – Channel 5's HD channel becomes a pay channel on the Sky platform.
- 2014
  - 4 February – Channel 5 launches Channel 5 +24, a 1-day time shift of the main Channel 5 service.
  - 10 September – Northern & Shell sells Channel 5 to Viacom for £450 million.
- 2015
  - 15 April – Spike launches as a British version of the American channel of the same name.
  - 8 August – Football returns to Channel 5 when it takes over the contract to broadcast highlights of the Football League and the League Cup. It launches two new programmes under the revived Football on 5 banner. They are called The Championship and The Goal Rush. The programmes are broadcast from 9pm on Saturday evening.

Logo used since 2016 (new colour scheme chosen by 2025)

- 2016
  - 11 February – 5* is rebranded 5Star.
  - 4 May – Channel 5's HD channel launches on Freeview and Freesat following the channel becoming free-to-air.
  - 10 August – Channel 5 +24 is replaced by My5, featuring a selection of shows from across the network of channels.
- 2017
  - 31 October – Male-skewing channel Spike is rebranded as 5Spike to more closely associate itself with its sister channels.
- 2018
  - 13 February – My5 is replaced by 5Select. It had previously been expected to launch as 5Prime.
  - May – Channel 5's right to show EFL highlights end after the contract transfers to Quest.
  - 14 June – Matthew Wright presents his last edition of The Wright Stuff after 18 years.
  - 4 July – Paramount Network launches.
  - 3 September – Jeremy Vine replaces Matthew Wright as host of Channel 5's morning topical discussion programme. Consequently, The Wright Stuff ends after 18 years.
  - 14 September – After seven years, Channel 5 announces that Big Brother and Celebrity Big Brother will end after the current series.
- 2019
  - 15 September – After 14 seasons, Channel 5 shows cricket highlights for the final time. The rights transfer to the BBC from 2020 onwards.

== 2020s ==
- 2020
  - 7 January – 5Spike closes. Its programming is transferred to Paramount Network.
- 2021
  - 25 September – Channel 5 and its sister channels are knocked off air for around an hour and experience some issues after returning. This is blamed on the activation of fire suppression systems at playout provider Red Bee Media's White City location, also affecting fellow broadcasters Channel 4 and the BBC. Both Channel 4 and 5 experience issues into the next week, with the latter faring better. Both of the broadcasters' channels are thought to be operating in a 'disaster recovery' mode for the time being.
  - 8 November – Channel 5 relaunches 5 News as a single one-hour show, broadcasting from 5pm until 6pm.
- 2022
  - 19 January – Paramount Network is relaunched as 5Action. The change comes ahead of the UK launch of streaming service Paramount+.
  - 29 July – Channel 5 airs the hour-long finale of Neighbours.
- 2023
  - 1 November – Paramount announced that My5 would be merged with Pluto TV in the UK, with its full launch date set to be planned for the second half of 2024.
- 2024
  - 20 August – Channel 5 announced that their company, as well as the channel and My5, will be rebranded to simply "5". Plans to consolidate Pluto TV with My5 have also been shelved.

Logo (same as before but with a colour scheme chosen since 2025)

- 2025
  - 12 March – Channel 5 rebrands its television channel and online streaming service My5 as "5", the third time the channel has undergone a rebrand since its launch in 1997.
- 2026
  - 5 January – 5 launches a new weekday daytime schedule of 6 hours of continuous live talk-focused programming.
  - 23 July–2 August – 5 will show nightly highlights of the 2026 Commonwealth Games. TNT Sports will show the live coverage after it outbid the BBC for the rights to the event which the Corporation had shown since 1954.
  - 21 October – 5Drama replaces 5Select.

== See also ==
- Timeline of sport on Channel 5
