= Smithsonian Channel (UK and Ireland) =

- Country: United Kingdom and Ireland
- Broadcast area: United Kingdom and Ireland

Programming
- Language: English
- Picture format: 1080i HDTV (downscaled to 16:9 576i for the SDTV feed)

Ownership
- Owner: Paramount Networks UK & Australia
- Sister channels: Channel 5; 5Star; 5USA; 5Select; 5Action

History
- Launched: 12 February 2019; 7 years ago
- Closed: 6 January 2023; 3 years ago

Links
- Website: www.smithsonianchannel.co.uk

Smithsonian Channel was a British free-to-air television channel that was launched as the UK version of the US documentary network Smithsonian Channel. It launched on 12 February 2019 and closed down on 6 January 2023.

The content of the channel, much of which is drawn from the US station, comprised predominantly original non-fiction programming covering a range of historical, scientific and cultural subjects.

== Carriage ==
Test transmissions for the new services began with the addition of HD and subsequently SD broadcast capacity on the Astra 2G satellite in late 2018.

The channel was officially made available on 12 February 2019. Ahead of the launch, it had been suggested that the network would begin on satellite, then launch on Freeview in the spring, though it launched on all four platforms, along with Freesat.

== Closure ==
On December 15, 2022, it was announced that the channel would be closing on January 6, 2023, after nearly four years on air. Its programming shifted online to other Paramount Global presences, including Paramount+, My5 and Pluto TV.

== See also ==
- Smithsonian Channel – original US version of the station
- Smithsonian Channel (Canada) – Canadian version of the station
- PBS America – similar UK channel showing predominantly US documentaries
