= Access (British TV programme) =

- Genre: Entertainment; News
- Narrated by: James Sloan
- Composer: Noise Fusion
- Country of origin: United Kingdom
- Original language: English

Production
- Executive producer: Jonathan Pascoe
- Running time: 5–30 minutes
- Production companies: ITN Productions; Channel 5 Broadcasting Limited

Original release
- Network: 5
- Release: 2015 – 2021

Related
- 5 News; Entertainment News on 5 (2021–)

Access is a British entertainment news television programme created by 5 that aired on the channel and its sister networks 5Select, 5Star, 5USA and Paramount Network. It was wholly unrelated to the American entertainment news programme Access Hollywood.

== History ==
Access was previously two different shows, 5* Access and Inside Hollywood, but the two were combined to create the new format of Access in 2015. The theme music for Access was written by Ben Neidle for UK production company Noise Fusion. Outside the traditional half-hour version, shorter segments were used as interstital filler between programmes on the sister networks of Channel 5.

In 2021, the programme was replaced with Entertainment News on 5, which features a similar format.
