= 5Select =

British free-to-air digital television channel

- Logo used from 2018 to 2026
- Country: United Kingdom

Programming
- Language: English
- Picture format: 576i SDTV

Ownership
- Owner: Paramount Networks UK & Australia
- Parent: Channel 5 Broadcasting Limited
- Sister channels: 5; 5Action; 5Star; 5USA

History
- Launched: 13 February 2018
- Closed: 21 October 2026
- Replaced by: 5Drama

Links
- Website: 5Select (closed, redirects to 5Drama)

Availability

Terrestrial
- Freeview: Channel 46

5Select was a British free-to-air television channel which featured documentaries, arts, dramas, comedies and Channel 5 original content. It was owned by Channel 5 Broadcasting Limited, a wholly owned subsidiary of Paramount Skydance Corporation, which is grouped under Paramount Networks UK & Australia division.

== History ==
My5 was a channel based on the most popular TV shows that are broadcast across all of the Channel 5 network. It was originally launched as Channel 5 +24, a 24-hour timeshift of the main Channel 5 schedule, and began broadcasting on 4 February 2014, available on Freeview, Freesat, Sky and Virgin Media. The channel replaced 5* +1 on Freesat, Sky and Virgin Media. The channel was originally announced as 5 Later, but changed shortly before launch. 5* +1 returned on Freesat channel 132 on 16 September 2014, and launched on Sky on 4 November 2014, replacing the timeshift of BET UK. Until 1 February 2016, two versions of Channel 5 +24 were broadcast: evening primetime content was the same on both, but the version carried to Freeview had continuous teleshopping presentations outside the primetime block, whilst the version carried to satellite and cable viewers interspersed teleshopping 'windows' with a three-hour programming block, broadcast at 10 am, 4 pm and 3 am daily, comprising replays of the previous day's Channel 5 Neighbours and Home & Away episodes and the matinée movie shown on Channel 5 the previous afternoon – this was to get around restrictions that platform operators place on the amount of continuous teleshopping that can be broadcast on entertainment-category channels.

On 10 August 2016, Channel 5 +24 was renamed My5. The channel was no longer a 24-hour timeshift of the Channel 5 schedule but showed a selection of programmes from across the network of channels, similar to 4seven. The renaming brought it in line with Channel 5's online on demand service, also called My5. On 17 December 2017, it was announced that My5 would be replaced by a new channel, 5Prime, with the channel showing critically acclaimed premium content and new commissions such as The Secret Life of Owls and The Yorkshire Vet Casebook. It was going to be a catch-up channel, launching in January 2018.

However, on 3 January 2018 it was confirmed that the launch would not go ahead until at least early spring, with the broadcaster rethinking the new channel's strategy, look and potentially changing the name. A month later, 5Prime was rebranded as 5Select. The new channel was launched as 5Select on 13 February 2018, with the My5 brand being used for an on-demand service that, by 2019, also included programming from Pluto TV, Together and Spark. It launched at 9:00am on 13 February 2018, with the first programme, Access, being shown. On the 1 July 2021, 5Select moved from the SDN (COM4) MUX to the BBC B HD Mux on Freeview. As a result, viewers with older Freeview equipment lost the channel while viewers with DVB-T2 compatible Freeview TVs or Freeview+HD boxes feature could receive the channel.

5Select closed on 21 October 2026 and was replaced by 5Drama. The new channel swapped EPG slots with 5Action.

== Programming ==
=== First-run ===
- The Dog Rescuers with Alan Davies (from 2019, earlier series debuted on Channel 5)
- The Dog Rescuers: Best in Show
- The Highland Vet (from the makers of The Yorkshire Vet, Daisybeck Studios, but based at practices in Thurso and Wick)
- 1,000 Years of History (including episodes on China and Scotland)
- The Secret Life of Owls
- The Story of the Songs (episodes with rock acts broadcast only by 5Select, episodes with pop acts shown on Channel 5)
- Striking Out
- Then & Now (subjects have included British Airways, London Transport and various British rivers, with some programmes re-titled by Channel 5 and shown on the main channel under names such as Secrets of the River Clyde)
- Thirties in Colour: Countdown to War (with the channel also broadcasting 2009 series World War II in Colour in a similar timeslot, once the three episodes had been shown)
- Walking Victorian Britain (with Onyeka Nubia)
- Walking Wartime Britain (presented by former Royal Marine Arthur Williams)
- The Yorkshire Vet Casebook
- Prisoner: Cell Block H (Previously dropped on My5 for the first three seasons between September 2023 and August 2024, followed by second-run broadcasts on 5Select; In January 2025, for its fourth season, it receives first-run broadcasts on 5Select before streaming on My5)

=== Second-run ===
- Entertainment News on 5)
- Ben Fogle: New Lives in the Wild
- Britain's Favourite 80s Songs (known in the VIS/Viacom Studios UK catalogue under the title The 80s Greatest Hits 1980–1989)
- A Country Life for Half the Price with Kate Humble
- The Dog Rescuers (until 2019, when new series debuted on 5Select)
- Dogs with Incredible Jobs
- GPs: Behind Closed Doors
- The Hotel Inspector
- How the Victorians Built Britain (documentary series with Michael Buerk)
- ITN Royal Documentaries (with titles such as Fergie vs Diana: Royal Wives at War, Beatrice and Eugenie: Pampered Princesses? and Princess Margaret: Rebel Without A Crown)
- Neighbours
- 101 Events That Made the 20th Century
- The Story of the Songs (most episodes were broadcast back-to-back with Britain's Favourite 80s Songs on Channel 5, though selected episodes with rock bands like Metallica or The Police debuted on 5Select with no Channel 5 transmission dates)
- Wonderful Wales with Michael Ball
- World War 1 in Colour
- World War II in Colour (this 2009 series was broadcast as a follow-up to Thirties in Colour: Countdown to War in the 5Select weekly schedules)
- A Year in the Wild (nature documentary, with series devoted to Alaska, Loch Lomond and Yorkshire)
- The Yorkshire Vet
