= The Dog Rescuers =

- Genre: Documentary
- Presented by: Alan Davies (2014–2021); Angellica Bell (2018)
- Narrated by: Russell Tovey (2013)
- Country of origin: United Kingdom
- Original language: English
- No. of series: 11
- No. of episodes: 114

Production
- Running time: 30 minutes (2013); 60 minutes (2014—2021)
- Production companies: Middlechild and Motion Content Group

Original release
- Network: Channel 5 (2013–18); 5Select (2019–21)
- Release: 8 October 2013 – 15 November 2021

The Dog Rescuers (sometimes known as The Dog Rescuers with Alan Davies) is a British television programme that followed the work of animal charity RSPCA, specifically their work rescuing dogs.

A total of six series and eight special episodes of the show were broadcast on Channel 5 from 8 October 2013 to 26 December 2019, the show moved to 5Select in 2019 with the first episode of the seventh series airing on 14 October 2019.

The first season of the show was originally narrated by Russel Tovey. From the second season on Alan Davies, the English stand-up comedian, hosted the show.

The show takes place in different parts of the UK, helping dogs who were neglected, abused, or abandoned. Throughout the documentary the audience will see the insides of a vet clinic and their process they do in order to help the dogs. Some of the types of professionals the audiences see within the documentary are vets, animal control, police officers, and or RSPCA Inspectors.

== Transmissions ==
=== Series ===
Series	Series start	Series end	Episodes	Channel
1	8 October 2013	3 December 2013	10	Channel 5
2	3 June 2014	19 August 2014	12	Channel 5
3	19 May 2015	4 August 2015	15	Channel 5
4	21 June 2016	27 September 2016	15	Channel 5
5	27 June 2017	19 September 2017	13	Channel 5
6	12 June 2018	14 August 2018	9	Channel 5
7	14 October 2019	9 December 2019	8	5Select
8	2 September 2020	12 October 2020	7	5Select
9	30 November 2020	21 December 2020	4	5Select
10	8 June 2021	27 July 2021	8	5Select
11	11 October 2021	15 November 2021	6	5Select

=== Specials ===
Series	Original air date
Christmas special	24 December 2014
Puppy special	27 October 2015
Christmas specials	15 & 22 December 2015
Christmas special	21 December 2016
Christmas special	December 2017
21 Dogs – The Big Rescue	20 February 2018
Christmas special	26 December 2018
Christmas Special	19 December 2019
Christmas Special	21 December 2020

== The Kitten Rescuers/Jo Brand's Cats & Kittens ==
On 28 December 2016, Jo Brand presented a one-off episode entitled "The Kitten Rescuers" on Channel 5. In 2017, it was turned into a series renamed as "Jo Brand's Cats & Kittens" it began airing on 14 November 2017 for a six-episode run until 19 December 2017.

== The Dog Rescuer | Pets & Vets ==
Under the Youtube account, "Pets & Vets" there is a section of "The Dog Rescuer" documentaries with Alan Davie. These are new episodes that are not found on streaming platforms. They consist of the same content as the television series with more recent release dates. The first release date was on 21 December 2022. The latest episode was released on 2 June 2022. The documentary continues to follow RSPCA inspectors as they work to try to help rescue dogs across the UK.
