= 5 (streaming service) =

UK video-on-demand service

- Logo used since 2025
- Original author: 5
- Developer: Skydance Corporation
- Operating system: Windows; webOS; macOS; Linux; Xbox 360; Xbox One; PlayStation 3; PlayStation 4; PlayStation 5; Amazon Fire TV; Roku; Apple TV; Android TV; Chromecast; Now
- Type: Television catch-up
- Website: channel5.com

5 (previously Five Download and later Demand Five then Demand 5 and My5) is the brand name of video-on-demand services offered by Channel 5 Broadcasting Limited, operator of TV channel 5, in the United Kingdom. The service is ad-supported and provided over-the-top to various different consumer devices. It is owned by Skydance Corporation and operated by their UK division.

== History ==
The service went live on 26 June 2008.

As Five Download, the service offered downloads in Windows Media Video format of the US imports CSI, House and Grey's Anatomy. Individual episodes could be 'rented', with some episodes available seven days before they appeared on TV.

More varied content from Channel 5's programming has become available since June 2008, with a wider prevalence of free content offered for 30 days after broadcast. In January 2009, Demand 5 began to offer content in the Flash Video format, allowing users with Apple Macintosh computers to access their content. In December 2018, Demand 5 for all platforms carrying shows from Channel 5 was retired.

On 1 November 2023, Paramount announced that it would merge My5 with Pluto TV in the UK, with its full launch date set to be planned for the second half of 2024. These plans would be shelved with the announcement on 20 August 2024 that the service would instead be revamped and, along with Channel 5, would be rebranded as simply 5 on 12 March 2025.

== Web platforms ==
=== 5 website ===
5 is the main source of on-demand programmes from Viacom services like 5, 5Star and Pluto TV. It offers a seven-day catch-up service as well as an archive of past shows.

=== YouTube ===
5 is also partly available on YouTube, launching in the United Kingdom on 4 December 2009. My5's catch-up content reaches YouTube shortly after TV transmission and users are able to browse 250 hours of the broadcaster's archive content.

== Television platforms ==
=== BT Vision ===
Demand 5 launched on BT Vision on 7 October 2008. Demand 5 was removed from BT Vision on 6 October 2010, although the two companies continued discussions in a bid to reinstate the service, having previously stalled during contract renegotiations. The service returned to BT Vision in May 2011.

=== Freesat ===
Demand 5 is available as part of Freesat's second generation Free Time guide, having been added on 6 August 2013, offering the last seven days of programming integrated to the TV guide.

=== Roku ===
On 26 July 2013, Now TV released a Now TV-branded Roku streaming box, including a Demand 5 app. Three days after the release of the Now TV Box, Roku added Demand 5 to its own range of streaming devices. The Roku service continued to operate in the Demand 5 format until December 2018, when it was upgraded to My5.

=== Sky ===
On 26 July 2012, it was announced that Demand 5 would be added to On Demand later in the year. The service was made available on 26 September 2012.

=== Televisions and Blu-ray players ===
In September 2009, an agreement was reached to make Demand 5 is available through Sony's Blu-ray Disc players, Blu-ray home cinema systems and Smart TVs, via the BRAVIA Internet Video service.

On 13 May 2011, it was announced that Demand 5 would also be available on Samsung's Smart TVs through their Samsung Smart TV service. On 16 January 2013 a Demand 5 app was launched and is available to download on Samsung Apps.

As of 2020, the 5 app is also available on Android TV, Amazon Fire TV, Apple TV and Chromecast devices.

The 5 app is pre installed on LG webOS smart TVs and can also be downloaded from the LG content store.

=== Virgin Media ===
5 is available on Virgin Media's cable television service, offering programmes for 7 days after broadcast since November 2010.

In late 2019, it was confirmed that as part of a wider deal with ViacomCBS, the My5 app, along with the UK version of Pluto TV and subscription service MTV Play would be made available on Virgin Media.

=== YouView ===
5 was one of four services available at the launch of YouView in July 2012. At launch the My5 app contained options to resume watching recent programmes, access favourites, browse featured programmes or a full list of shows, find similar programmes or more episodes and an integrated search bar.

== Game consoles ==
=== PlayStation ===
An application for Sony PlayStation 3 owners was made available on 9 April 2013, PlayStation 4 on 15 November 2013 and PlayStation 5 on 12 November 2020. As of 9 April 2026, this app is no longer available on PS4 due to technical reasons.

The Channel 5 app is not available on PS5.

From December 2018, the Demand 5 app was retired from all platforms and replaced by My5.

=== Xbox ===
On 5 October 2011, it was announced that My5 (Demand 5 at the time) would be made available on Xbox 360 and was later made available on Xbox One.

As with the PS3 app, the Demand 5 Xbox app was retired in December 2018.

== Mobile platforms ==
=== iOS devices ===
A Big Brother Demand 5 app for the iPad, iPod Touch and iPhone launched on 19 August 2011, the app offered a 30-day catch-up service for Big Brother content. The app was later extended to incorporate catch-up content from Channel 5, 5* (5Star) and 5USA, creating an overall Demand 5 app. The app is compatible with iOS 10.0 or later. Reviews of the app have been very poor due to, among other issues, that Demand 5 can only be used on Wifi networks, rather than 3G or 4G

=== Android ===
On 16 May 2013, Demand 5 was launched on a range of Samsung Galaxy Android devices including smartphone and tablets.

=== Windows Phone ===
On 25 November 2013, Demand 5 was launched for mobile phone handsets running the Windows Phone 8 platform. In December 2018, the Demand 5 Windows Phone 8 app was retired. Along with Windows Phone 8 app, the Demand 5 app for Windows 8, Windows 8.1 and Windows 10 was also retired in December 2018.

== Programming ==
In addition to programming taken from Paramount Global services like BET and Pluto TV Drama, 5 used to act as the on-demand service for a number of other UK channels and programme content owners, like A+E Networks' Blaze, until 30 September 2021, when those agreements were voided and it became a service for content exclusive to PNUK&A networks. BET shows and specials are still available on My5 along with a number of classic MTV reality shows (such as Ex on the Beach and Geordie Shore) as My5 Exclusives, with the British BET International channel being streamed in the UK via Pluto TV.

=== Current live TV channels ===
- 5
- 5Star
- 5USA
- 5Action
- 5Select

=== Additional 5 only programming ===
In addition to the channels listed above, the service includes programmes from these channels/brands:

- BET (until 2022, programmes listed in the BET section)
- MTV (certain programmes only until 2022, listed as My5 Exclusives)

==== 5 Exclusives ====
Programmes include:

- The Arrangement
- Hapless
- The Royals
- Seven Types of Ambiguity
- World Without End

=== FAST channels ===
In 2025, as part of the revamp of the My5 streaming service as 5, a suite of FAST channels, some of which had previously been available elsewhere such as on Paramount's Pluto TV platform, were added to 5's "live TV" lineup alongside streams of the free linear TV channels. The initial suite of FAST channels rolled out were:

- 5 A&E - showing medical emergency series
- 5 Cops - showing police-themed programming
- 5 Crime - showing crime documentaries
- 5 History - showing historical documentaries
- 'Box-set' single-programme rolling channels for Bargain-Loving Brits, Dogs Behaving (Very) Badly, GPs Behind Closed Doors, Police Interceptors, Trucking Hell and The Yorkshire Vet
- A round-the-clock rolling channel with content from the Milkshake! children's programming strand
- MTV Reality, with a mix of reality TV programming from the MTV stable, plus dedicated box-set channels for Catfish, Geordie Shore and Teen Mom (these programmes had previously been available to view for free on Pluto TV.)

The 5-branded and Milkshake! channels, but not the MTV-branded services, were subsequently integrated into the Freely programme guide. 5 does not yet carry the MTV-branded music video streaming channels available on Pluto TV.

=== Former channels ===
Content from a number of other channels was available until 30 September 2021:

- Blaze
- CBS Reality (channel co-owned with AMC Networks International)
- discover.film
- Horror (channel co-owned with AMC Networks International)
- Masters of Food
- PBS America
- Pluto TV Drama
- Pluto TV Food
- Pluto TV Movies
- Smithsonian Channel (owned by Paramount in association with the Smithsonian Institution)
- Real Stories
- Reel Truth Crime
- Timeline
- Together TV

== See also ==
- Paramount+
- Pluto TV
- BBC iPlayer
- ITVX
- STV Player
- Channel 4
- List of streaming media services
