= The World's Deadliest Weather =

- title card
- Also known as: World’s Deadliest Weather: Caught on Camera
- Genre: documentary
- Narrated by: Louis Mellis; Euan Macnaughton
- Country of origin: United Kingdom
- No. of seasons: 6

Production
- Production company: back2back Productions Ltd

The World's Deadliest Weather is a television programme that combines footage of weather with interviews of those who captured it.

== Series 3 ==
Series 3 premiered on BBC Earth Asia.

== Series 4 ==
Series 4 premiered on BBC Earth South Africa. It was pre-purchased for broadcast in the United States by The Weather Channel

== Series 5 ==
Series 5 premiered on BBC Earth South Africa.

No. in series	Title	Original release date	Ref
1	"Eye Of Ida"	19:00, 9 June 2022	
Hurricane Ida in Louisiana, Eemslift Hendrika evacuation
2	"Turkey Tsunami"	TBA	
2020 Aegean Sea earthquake, Riverside Fire
3	"La Palma Volcano"	TBA	
2021 Cumbre Vieja volcanic eruption, Sumas Prairie floods, July 2021 northern Italy hailstorm
4	"Tornado Terror"	TBA	
Humphreys_County/Waverly floods, 2021 Barrie tornado, Strickland River flooding
5	"Hail, Wind, Ice & Fire"	TBA	
Hurricane Ida tornado outbreak, 8 May 2017 Denver metropolitan area hailstorm, 2021 Wooroloo bushfire
6	"Europe Floods"	TBA	
2021 Austrian floods, 2021 Belgium floods, October 2021 Thasang landslides caused by Tukuche Peak, Caldor Fire, January 3–4, 2022 nor'easter in Virginia
7	"Creek Fire"	TBA	
Creek Fire, 2021 South Moravia tornado, Hurricane Florence in North Carolina
8	"NSW Floods"	TBA	
2021 Mid North Coast floods, November 6 Vancouver tornado
9	"Marshall Fire"	19:00, 4 August 2022	
Marshall Fire, Sandia Peak Tramway incident, 2021 Alabama tornado outbreak
10	"Typhoon Rai"	19:00, 11 August 2022	
Typhoon Rai, Almeda Drive Fire
11	"Tonga Tsunami"	19:00, 18 August 2022	
March 21, 2022 Jacksboro tornado, 2022 Hunga Tonga–Hunga Haʻapai eruption and tsunami, Storm Eunice in the United Kingdom, Tornado outbreak of December 10–11, 2021
12	"Ida NYC"	19:00, 25 August 2022	
Effects of Hurricane Ida in the Northeastern United States, LNU Lightning Complex fires
13	"BC Floods"	19:00, 1 September 2022	
Hurricane_Delta in Louisiana, 2021 British Columbia floods, 2022 Brazil landslides

== Series 6 ==
Series 6 premiered on 5Action.

Title	Original release date	Ref
"Turkey Earthquake"	21:00, 24 September 2025	
2023 Turkey–Syria earthquakes
"UK Wildfires"	21:00, 1 October 2025	
2022 United Kingdom wildfires
"Rhodes Wildfire"	21:00, 8 October 2025	
2023 Rhodes wildfires
"Typhoon Odette"	21:00, 15 October 2025	TBA
Typhoon Odette
"Hurricane Otis"	21:00, 22 October 2025	
Hurricane Otis
"LA Wildfires"	21:00, 29 October 2025	
January 2025 Southern California wildfires, 2023 Emilia-Romagna floods and Hurricane Milton
"Hurricane Helene"	21:00, 5 November 2025	
Hurricane Helene and the 2024 Houston derecho
"Milton Tornados"	21:00, 12 November 2025	
Hurricane Milton tornado outbreak and 2023 Hawaii wildfires
"Hurricane Ian"	21:00, 19 November 2025	
Hurricane Ian and 2024 Portugal wildfires
"Hurricane Idalia"	21:00, 26 November 2025	
Hurricane Idalia and the Oregon Fire
"Hurricane Beryl"	21:00, 3 December 2025	
Hurricane Beryl and the December 14, 2024 Scotts Valley tornado
"Italy Floods"	21:00, 10 December 2025	
September 2024 Italian floods
"Spain Floods"	21:00, 17 December 2025	
2024 Spanish floods and the Bootleg Fire
