= Noise Fusion =

Audio production company based in London

Noise Fusion is an audio production company based in London, England, that creates audio branding for radio and television. The company was founded in 2004 by producer Ben Neidle.

== Information ==
Noise Fusion has been recognised for their audio imaging work for the UK radio station XFM - some of this work was nominated for a 2006 Sony Radio Academy Award. The company's creative director, Ben Neidle, previously received three Sony Radio Academy Awards while employed by XFM from 1998-2004 as a producer.

As of 2016, the company's main activities appear to be custom music production for media and sound design services. They also offer radio imaging effects packages for producers and stations to purchase.

In 2015, Noise Fusion produced the theme music and bed for the rebrand of entertainment news round-up programme FYI Daily for the ITV Digital Channels. In 2017, the produced the music for the similar Channel 5 programme Access.

In July 2024, the company launched a new flagship radio production library produced by Neidle called Ultra, based on elements created for UK station Capital Radio.
