= Rich Kids Go Skint =

- Also known as: Rich Kids Turn Skint; When Rich Kids Go Skint
- Genre: Reality
- Narrated by: Jessica Ransom
- Country of origin: United Kingdom
- Original language: English
- No. of series: 5
- No. of episodes: 47

Production
- Executive producers: Asif Hasan; Nick Parnes
- Producer: Roger Oldham
- Editors: Gruff Lovgreen; Ian Golf
- Camera setup: Multi-camera setup
- Running time: 60 minutes
- Production company: Kalel Productions

Original release
- Network: 5Star
- Release: 18 April 2018 – 10 April 2023

Related
- Rich Kids Go Shopping; Rich Kids Go Homeless

Rich Kids Go Skint is a British television series which featured "rich kids" who are paired up with families not as wealthy as them, and are usually required to do basic tasks such as: food shopping for the family, cooking dinner for them and washing up, giving them an understanding of how living with a small amount of money can be incredibly hard for the families.

== Series overview ==
Series	Episodes	Originally released	
Series	Episodes	First released	Last released
1	6	18 April 2018	22 May 2018
2	7	8 October 2018	19 November 2018
3	9	5 February 2019	18 April 2019
4	15	28 October 2019	7 June 2021
5	10	8 January 2023	10 April 2023

== Episodes ==
=== Series 1 (2018) ===
No. overall	No. in series	Features	Original release date
1	1	Fergus Prutton	18 April 2018
2	2	Sepideh Samaee (also known as: Sepii Samaee)	25 April 2018
3	3	Dhillan Bhardwaj	1 May 2018
4	4	Angelina Green	8 May 2018
5	5	Jodie Weston	15 May 2018
6	6	Callum Ryan	22 May 2018

=== Series 2 (2018) ===
No. overall	No. in series	Features	Original release date
7	1	Patrick Cathcart	8 October 2018
8	2	Sasha	15 October 2018
9	3	Kofi Case	28 October 2018
10	4	Becca Delaroque	29 October 2018
11	5	Freddie Pownall	11 November 2018
12	6	Andrea Recchia	12 November 2018
13	7	Yasmine Zweegers	19 November 2018

=== Series 3 (2019) ===
No. overall	No. in series	Features	Original release date
14	1	Maria Rimmer	5 February 2019
15	2	Daryl Charles De Koningh	12 February 2019
16	3	Jacob	19 February 2019
17	4	Fatima Khan	26 February 2019
18	5	Shaira	5 March 2019
19	6	Alex Ersoz	12 March 2019
20	7	Navid Sole	19 March 2019
21	8	Emily	26 March 2019
22	9	Susannah	18 April 2019

=== Series 4 (2019–2021) ===
No. overall	No. in series	Features	Original release date
23	1	Adil	28 October 2019
24	2	Sophie Flo	4 November 2019
25	3	Devon Lloyd	11 November 2019
26	4	Nadia Nuseibeh	18 November 2019
27	5	Tiana	25 November 2019
28	6	Olivia	2 December 2019
29	7	April	16 December 2019
30	8	Rendall	2 December 2020
31	9	Reni	9 December 2020
32	10	Alex	16 December 2020
33	11	Mercedez	10 May 2021
34	12	Sam	17 May 2021
35	13	James	24 May 2021
36	14	Brooke	31 May 2021
37	15	Jess	7 June 2021

=== Series 5 (2023) ===
No. overall	No. in series	Features	Original release date
38	1	Ellie	8 January 2023
39	2	Naveena	15 January 2023
40	3	Annie	22 January 2023
41	4	Veronika	29 January 2023
42	5	Jab	5 February 2023
43	6	Olly	12 February 2023
44	7	Josie	19 February 2023
45	8	Mimi	27 March 2023
46	9	Tochi	3 April 2023
47	10	Indigo	10 April 2023

== Rich Kids Go Homeless ==
Whilst under the "Rich Kids" franchise name, Rich Kids Go Homeless was created by Zeppelin Films, a different company for the franchise who used Twenty Twenty for Rich Kids Go Shopping and Kalel Productions for Rich Kids Go Skint.
