= 5Spike =

British digital television channel

- Logo used from 2017 to 2020
- Country: United Kingdom
- Broadcast area: United Kingdom
- Network: Channel 5

Programming
- Language: English
- Picture format: 576i 16:9 SDTV
- Timeshift service: 5Spike +1

Ownership
- Owner: Channel 5 Broadcasting Limited

History
- Launched: 15 April 2015; 11 years ago
- Closed: 7 January 2020; 6 years ago
- Replaced by: Paramount Network
- Former names: Spike (2015–2017)

5Spike was a British free-to-air television channel owned by ViacomCBS Networks UK & Australia. Launching on 15 April 2015 on Freeview as just Spike, it was a localised version of the American cable channel Spike (now Paramount Network), and became a multiplex channel of Channel 5 in 2017 when it renamed as 5Spike. It primarily aired entertainment programmes, including action and drama series, police documentaries, and programming from its American counterpart, as well as mixed martial arts.

On 7 January 2020, the network was discontinued, with Paramount Network assuming its channel placements and programming.

== History ==
Following Viacom's acquisition of Channel 5, it was confirmed in late 2014 that a local version of the male-skewing American channel Spike would be launching in the United Kingdom, with the channel proposed to replace Viva on Freeview. The channel was operated under the auspices of Channel 5's programming director Ben Frow; of Spike's lineup, he described the service as a "driven, high-energy channel offering a point of view and program mix I think is different from anything else on British TV right now."

Spike logo used from 2015-2017

Spike launched on 15 April 2015 on Freeview channel 31, displacing 5USA; although it was originally announced that Spike would replace Viva entirely on Freeview, Viva was instead moved to a different channel and reduced to two hours per day to conserve bandwidth for Spike, with 5USA taking on its previous channel allotment. Among its first programmes, the premiere of Police Interceptors Unleashed was seen by 137,000 viewers.

The logo for the channel's timeshift equivalent

On 31 October 2017, Spike was rebranded as 5Spike to more closely associate itself with its sister channels and the Channel 5 brand.

A British version of Spike's successor in the US, Paramount Network, was launched on 4 July 2018. On 7 January 2020, 5Spike was merged with Paramount Network.

== Programming ==
The channel's lineup drew primarily from the original programmes produced by its American counterpart, including Catch a Contractor and Lip Sync Battle among others. The channel also aired imported American dramas, from modern dramas such as Breaking Bad (notably marking the first time the entire series would be broadcast by British television; only the first two seasons were shown by Fox and 5 USA, with the remainder available via Netflix), Sons of Anarchy, Terminator: The Sarah Connor Chronicles and The Walking Dead, to classic shows such as The X-Files, The A-Team and Knight Rider. Spike also carried original British productions, such as Police Interceptors Unleashed (a spin-off of the Channel 5 series), and repeats of some of Channel 5's factual programmes.

As in the United States, mixed-martial arts also comprised a portion of Spike's lineup, with British TV rights to Bellator MMA and, under a long-term deal, exclusive rights to BAMMA events beginning with BAMMA 20 on 25 April 2015.

=== Original programming ===
- BAMMA
- Car Crash TV
- Criminals: Caught on Camera (also known as Caught on Camera)
- Fights, Camera, Action
- Outrageous Stunts (also known as Stunt Science)
- Police Interceptors Takedown
- Police Interceptors Unleashed
- Seconds from Death: Caught on Camera (also known as The World's Deadliest...)
- Sewermen
- Tattoo Disasters UK
- Trucking Hell
- Ultimate Boxxer
- Under Attack
- World's Deadliest Weather: Caught on Camera (also known as The World's Deadliest Weather)
- World's Wildest Flights

=== From Spike US ===
- Bar Rescue
- Bellator MMA
- Caraoke Showdown
- Catch a Contractor
- Cops
- Framework
- Frankenfood
- Hungry Investors (renamed as Restaurant Rescue)
- Life or Debt
- Lip Sync Battle
- Sweat Inc.

=== From Channel 5 ===
- Bad Tenants, Rogue Landlords
- Ben Fogle: New Lives in the Wild
- Can't Pay? We'll Take It Away
- Chris Tarrant: Extreme Railways
- Cowboy Builders
- Eddie Stobart: Trucks & Trailers
- The Gadget Show
- It Takes a Thief to Catch a Thief
- Nightmare Tenants, Slum Landlords
- Police Interceptors
- Robson's Extreme Fishing Challenge
- Traffic Cops
- UK's Strongest Man
- Weather Terror
- Winter Road Rescue
- World's Scariest...
- World's Strongest Man

=== Imported ===
- 19-2
- 60 Days In (renamed as 60 Days in Jail)
- Airport Security: Peru
- Airwolf
- Animal Fight Club
- The A-Team
- BattleBots
- Black Sails
- Boy to Man (renamed as Wildman: Extreme Adventurer)
- Behind Bars: The World's Toughest Prisons (renamed as World's Toughest Prisons)
- Breaking Bad (some seasons previously shown on Channel 5/5 USA)
- Cimarron Strip (renamed as The Cimarron Strip)
- Fail Army
- Fugitive Black Ops (renamed as Manhunt: Kill or Capture)
- From Dusk till Dawn: The Series
- Gangland Undercover
- Helix
- High Alert (renamed as High Alert: Policing the Streets)
- Impact Wrestling
- Justified
- Klondike
- Knight Rider
- Lockdown (renamed as America's Toughest Prisons)
- Megastructures
- Olympus
- Powers
- Running Wild with Bear Grylls
- Six
- Sons of Anarchy
- Spartacus
- Street Hawk
- Strongman Champions League
- Terminator: The Sarah Connor Chronicles
- Transporter: The Series
- The Walking Dead
- Vikings
- The Virginian
- Weather Gone Viral (renamed as Extreme Weather: Caught on Camera)
- Wild Catch (renamed as Chasing Monsters)
- Wynonna Earp
- The X-Files

=== Most watched programmes ===
The following is a list of the ten most watched shows on Spike, based on Live +7 data supplied by BARB up to 17 March 2019. The number of viewers does not include repeats or airings on 5Spike +1.

Rank	Show	Episode	Number of Viewers	Date
1	The Expendables 2	N/A	359,000	27 March 2016
2	The Guns of Navarone	N/A	343,000	20 May 2018
3	Centurion	N/A	328,000	12 February 2017
4	The Expendables 3	N/A	335,000	27 December 2017
5	The Expendables 3	N/A	327,000	26 March 2017
6	Battle of Britain	N/A	311,700	27 December 2019
7	Battle of Britain	N/A	306,500	9 March 2019
8	Transporter: The Series	2.07 – Sex, Lies and Video Tapes	303,000	19 February 2016
9	Trucking Hell	1.02 – Episode Two	294,000	24 May 2018
10	Hummingbird (film)	N/A	286,100	13 March 2019

== See also ==
- Spike (Australian TV channel)
- Spike (Dutch TV channel)
