= PBS America =

British free-to-air television channel

- Country: United Kingdom
- Broadcast area: United Kingdom, Ireland, Switzerland, Australia, Europe and New Zealand
- Headquarters: London, England

Programming
- Language: English
- Picture format: 1080i HDTV (downscaled to 576i for the SDTV feed)
- Timeshift service: PBS America +1 (2019–2022)

Ownership
- Owner: PBS UK LLC

History
- Launched: 1 November 2011
- Former names: PBS UK (2011–2012)

Links
- Website: www.pbsamerica.co.uk

Availability

Terrestrial
- Freeview: Channel 84

Streaming media
- My5: www.pbsamerica.co.uk

PBS America is a British-European free-to-air television channel derived from PBS, an American public television broadcaster similar to the BBC and Channel 4. It is a joint venture between entrepreneur David Lyons and PBS Distribution, itself a joint venture of PBS and the WGBH Educational Foundation, which owns the international rights to the bulk of PBS's output.

PBS America operates much like BBC Studios, a profit-making enterprise managed separately from the main non-profit, publicly financed arm, that will ideally generate money for its owner. It is provided by pay-television operators as part of their channel packages and carries advertising. Unlike PBS in the United States it does not solicit donations from viewers.

== Availability ==
Logo used until March 2023

PBS America was launched on 1 November 2011 (as PBS UK) on Sky and Virgin Media. On 23 August 2011, PBS UK launched a placeholder channel called Rosa on Sky channel 231; however, they were able to acquire the more prominent channel 166 EPG slot from Information TV for use from launch. On 28 October 2011, a barker channel for PBS UK was added to Virgin Media channel 243. The cable operator has also secured the rights to offer PBS content on its video on demand service, including the Virgin Media Player.

On 19 April 2012, the channel's Sky EPG slot was put up for sale, with seven-figure offers anticipated by broker Canis Media. While PBS UK was not closing, they were considering moving from the Entertainment genre to Documentaries. On Virgin Media, the channel is already positioned in the equivalent Factual genre. On 16 July, Canis Media confirmed that PBS had received numerous offers for the slot but they had fallen below expectations. PBS decided to stay in the Entertainment genre, while remaining interested in moving genre and keeping the slot on the market.

On 24 July 2013, PBS America moved to the Documentaries section on Sky channel 534, formerly used by Blighty, as part of a deal with UKTV. The exchange came about as Blighty was to be replaced on satellite by Drama, UKTV were required to exchange one of their documentary category slots for one in the Entertainment grid. PBS America returned into the top 100 channels on Sky following the EPG reshuffle of 1 May 2018, in which channels previously located in the Documentaries category were integrated in with those of the Entertainment sector.

On 31 October 2015, it launched on Freesat.

On 13 December 2017, PBS America was launched on Freeview.

In July 2018, it was announced that the Channel 5-owned video on demand service My5 had reached a deal to include content from PBS America into its offering.

In the 4th quarter of 2019, a 24-hour +1 channel launched only on Freeview on channel 93. It required a HD-capable receiver and one must be in the channel coverage area as well, due to having been on the COM7 multiplex. This +1 channel would later be shut down on 30 June 2022 due to the closure of the COM7 multiplex. PBS America also increased its coverage to be nationwide but changed broadcasting hours to be 1pm-11pm after CBS Drama went full time.

On 10 September 2024, the channel was made available in HD on Virgin Media.

== Programming ==
The channel consists of content drawn exclusively from PBS member stations, both older and current for which it is able to secure the rights. It does not make its own programmes in the UK, but a few of them are British productions which have been shown on PBS in the United States before being recycled back to the UK by PBS America, e.g. What the Ancients Did for Us.

The PBS America line-up heavily features documentaries and history programmes such as American Experience, Frontline and Nova as well as Ken Burns documentary films such as Prohibition. In total PBS America aired 500 unique hours of content in 2011 and will air 1000 hours in 2012. Children's programming does not air on the channel because the market is "well served for kids' content", along with commercial distribution contracts with other existing domestic children's networks.

== Branding and marketing ==
The channel's slogan is "Where television matters". Channel 4's Channel 4 Sales division is the exclusive advertising sales representative for the network.

Branding and design agency Dunning Penney Jones was appointed to create the channel's on-air look and feel. As well as repurposing the PBS branding used in the US, they created new idents specifically for the UK channel. The agency also designed four colour themes for each of PBS America's four programming strands for use on the channel, website and any off-air marketing.

On 4 July 2012, PBS UK was renamed PBS America.
