= FYI Daily =

- Logo used since 2015
- Genre: Entertainment news
- Country of origin: United Kingdom
- Original language: English

Production
- Producer: ITN Productions
- Running time: 1 minute

Original release
- Network: ITV2, ITV3, ITV4
- Release: 2010 – present

Related
- ITV News; The Rundown

FYI Daily is a 60-second daily entertainment news round-up. Broadcast on ITV2, ITV3 and ITV4, it generally airs mid-way through films, as an interstitial television show. It is produced by ITN Productions. The show formerly aired on ITVBe before the channel was shut down in June 2025.

== History ==
Prior to 2010 it was simply branded as Entertainment News, and before that was Showbiz News, which was initially created for the ITN News Channel.

In January 2021, an extended version of the programme, FYI Extra was introduced to the main ITV channel during the early hour of the morning. This version would air daily in a 15-minute slot, usually at 3am. The last edition aired in January 2022.

== Format ==
FYI Daily features news and gossip about showbiz, celebrities, pop culture, and also information and trailers for movies.

The theme music that runs throughout the programme was written and produced by Ben Neidle for the production company Noise Fusion.

== Presenters ==
Years	Newscasters	Title	Related notes
2011—	Melissa Nathoo	Presenter	Main presenter/Senior producer
2015—	Jonny Nelson	Presenter	
2026—	Jamie Burton	Presenter	
2017—	Jodie McCallum	Presenter	
2014–2015	Lauren Hood	Presenter	
2013–2018	Vick Hope	Presenter	
2013–2015	Stephanie Prentice	Presenter	
2012–2014	Poppy Jamie	Presenter	
2012–2013	Jane Witherspoon	Presenter	
2011–2013	Lucrezia Millarini	Presenter	Now ITV News/ITV News London newscaster
2011	Sarah Mills	Presenter	Now Thomson Reuters producer/reporter
2010–2012	Sangeeta Kandola	Presenter	Now ITV News/ITV News London correspondent/newsreader
2010–2011	Lucy Cotter	Presenter	Now Sky News entertainment correspondent
2010	Jasmine Lowson	Presenter	
