= Paramount Networks UK =

Division of Paramount International Networks

Skydance UK
- Formerly: ViacomCBS Networks UK & Australia (2020–2022); Paramount Networks UK & Australia (2022–2026)
- Type: Division
- Industry: Television
- Founded: 14 January 2020; 6 years ago (as Paramount Networks UK & Australia); 6 October 2026; 47 days ago (as Skydance UK)
- Headquarters: London, England
- Area served: United Kingdom and Ireland
- Products: Television channels
- Owner: Skydance International Content and Distribution
- Subsidiaries: Channel 5 Broadcasting Limited
- Website: paramount-mediahub.co.uk

Skydance UK is a division of Skydance International Networks launched on 14 January 2020. It is based in London, England.

== History ==
On 31 October 2022, Paramount Networks UK & Australia acquired the remaining stake in Nickelodeon UK Ltd., including its Nickelodeon-branded channels, from its partner Sky, bringing the British Nickelodeon channel under Paramount Networks UK & Australia's control as Sky was planning to launch its in-house children's channel Sky Kids as owning Nickelodeon UK would have restricted Sky from launching it.

On 22 June 2023, Paramount Networks UK & Australia announced its rebranding of its Australian free-to-air television channel 10 Shake under the Nickelodeon brand as the unit had brought the Nickelodeon name in-house and added Nickelodeon content on free-to-air linear television for the first time with them ending its long-standing partnership with Foxtel for the pay-TV channel of the same name as it chose to shutter the pay-TV channel alongside Nick Jr., however the pay-TV channel continued operating on Fetch TV and Sky in New Zealand while the rebranded free-to-air channel would bring all of Nickelodeon's programming under the FTA channel.

In October 2025 when Paramount Networks UK & Australia's parent Paramount Global merged with David Ellison's media entertainment Skydance Media into forming Paramount Skydance two months prior in August of that year, Paramount Networks UK & Australia announced that it would close five of its MTV-branded UK music pay-TV channels which consists of MTV Music, MTV 80s, MTV 90s, Club MTV and MTV Live at the end of December 2025 due to the company's restructuring policy. In 2026 when Paramount Skydance acquired Warner Bros. Discovery and was renamed Skydance, Skydance UK network 5's profit dropped by two-thirds.

== Units ==
=== Local free-to-air ===
- Channel 5 Broadcasting Limited
  - 5 (Milkshake!)
  - 5Action
  - 5Drama
  - 5Star
  - 5USA
  - 5 (streaming service)
- Quest
- Quest Red
- Really
- TLC
- DMAX
- Food Network

Joint venture with AMC Networks International UK:

- True Crime
- True Crime Xtra
- Legend
- Legend Xtra
- Watch Free UK

=== Pay TV networks ===
- MTV
- Nickelodeon
- Nicktoons
- Nick Jr. (and Nick Jr. Too)
- Animal Planet
- Boomerang
- Cartoon Network
- Cartoonito
- CNN International
- Discovery Channel
- Discovery History
- Discovery Science
- Discovery Turbo
- Investigation Discovery
- TNT Sports
  - TNT Sports 1
  - TNT Sports 2
  - TNT Sports 3
  - TNT Sports 4
  - TNT Sports 5
  - TNT Sports 6
  - TNT Sports 7
  - TNT Sports 8
  - TNT Sports 9
  - TNT Sports 10
  - TNT Sports Ultimate
  - TNT Sports Box Office
  - TNT Sports Box 2

Joint venture with Sky Group:

- Comedy Central
- Comedy Central Extra (Europe)

=== Streaming services ===
- 5
- HBO Max
- Discovery+
- Paramount+
- Pluto TV
- Watch Free UK (joint-venture with AMC Networks International UK)

=== Former assets ===
- 5Select
- 5Spike
- Club MTV
- CBS Justice
- Discovery Home & Health
- MTV 80s
- MTV 90s
- MTV Base
- MTV Classic
- MTV Hits
- MTV Live
- MTV Music
- MTV OMG
- MTV Rocks
- VH1
- Smithsonian Channel
- Toonami
- TruTV
- TCM Movies

== See also ==
- Paramount+
- Pluto TV
- HBO Max
- Discovery+
