= TVPlayer =

British internet television service

- Country: United Kingdom
- Availability: Internet
- Headquarters: 30 Haymarket, 3rd Floor, London, SW1Y 4EX
- Broadcast area: United Kingdom
- Established: 19 December 2013; 12 years ago
- Official website: www.tvplayer.com

TVPlayer was a United Kingdom Internet television service owned by international digital distribution company Alchimie. It provided access to free live television channel streams using a web browser or application software made for mobile devices. The service closed in September 2025.

== History ==
TVPlayer was launched as an Android and Apple iOS smartphone app on 19 December 2013. Compatible apps for Android tablet computers and the Apple iPad were released on 30 January 2014. As of January 2017, the applications had been downloaded 2.5 million times and had over one million active viewers.

On 30 January 2017, TVPlayer announced it had launched compatibility for all Windows 10 devices.

On 26 November 2020, TVPlayer's licensing agreement with Discovery expired. As a result, Discovery, Investigation Discovery, TLC and Discovery Home & Health were no longer available on TVPlayer's Premium service and Quest, Quest Red, Really, DMAX, Food Network and HGTV were removed from the free service.

In September 2025, the service went offline.

== Compatible devices ==
Devices and operating systems that can be used to watch TVPlayer television content:

- Laptops and desktop computers
  - Microsoft Windows 10 or later (Microsoft Store app)
  - Operating system with Adobe Flash Player enabled web browser
- Tablet computers and smartphones
  - Microsoft Windows 10 or later (Microsoft Store app)
  - Google Android 4.2 or later
  - Apple iOS 11.0 or later
  - Microsoft Windows 10 Mobile or later (Microsoft Store app)
  - Amazon Fire Tablet
- Video game consoles
  - Xbox One
  - PlayStation 5
  - Nintendo Switch
- Set-top box / streaming devices
  - EE TV (Premium Channels Only)
  - Freesat (Premium Channels Only)
  - Freeview (Premium Channels Only)
  - Apple TV
  - Roku
  - Amazon Fire TV
  - Chromecast
  - Android TV
  - Samsung TV
  - Humax H3 espresso
