= Tallafornia =

- Genre: Reality; Scripted reality
- Created by: Fintan Maguire; Dara Tallon
- Starring: Jay Abbey; Niall Fagon; Cormac Branagan; Kelly Donegan; David Buckley; Nikita Murray; Patrick Delaney; Natalie Geraghty
- Opening theme: "Kill Me" by Make the Girl Dance
- Country of origin: Ireland
- Original language: English
- No. of series: 2
- No. of episodes: 22

Production
- Running time: 30–40 mins

Original release
- Network: TV3; 3e
- Release: 12 December 2011 – 15 March 2013

Tallafornia is an Irish reality television series that was broadcast on TV3 in Ireland, previewing in December 2011 before debuting as a full series in January 2012. It is considered to be Ireland's answer to Jersey Shore. Seven housemates (ranging from 19 to 28 years of age) from Tallaght and the surrounding areas live together in a lavish townhouse in which their every act is filmed. It was cancelled in March 2013.

It was filmed in Saggart, 8 km (5.0 mi) west of Tallaght; the title is an ironic nickname based on California that had already been used for the Tallaght region for several years before the show aired.

The show was created by Fintan Maguire and Dara Tallon and was produced by Dara Tallon, Owen McArdle and Fintan Maguire (executive producer).

== Tallafornia 2 ==
In 2012 TV3 announced a second series of the show which was filmed in Santa Ponsa The station held open auditions for new candidates to appear in the show and received over 1,700 new applicants. A preview episode for the second series aired on TV3 on 8 December 2012. In this episode the housemates recap their behaviour from series one and go to the holiday villa in Santa Ponza where the second series was filmed. The second series began on TV3 on 4 January 2013 with the same cast as in series one. On 25 January, new cast member Marc O'Neill was seen for the first time on the show when he emerged naked from the pool at the villa to meet and greet the other cast members. During the second series, Marc and Natalie got close and became a couple. Also during the series Marc wound Cormac up on many occasions about his weight training and personality. The final episode of series two aired on 15 March 2013 as the cast left Santa Ponza to return to Ireland.

A new companion show Tallafornia: The After Party was launched in January 2013 and is shown directly after each new episode on TV3. The show which is hosted by Claire Solan is live and features a panel composed of members of the cast, and a celebrity guest to discuss the episode just aired. All members of the cast appeared on the show on 15 March which had followed the last episode of series two. In this episode it was confirmed that Marc and Natalie had since split up after returning to Ireland.

== Criticism ==
The show, although having received a large amount of popularity, has also garnered criticism from the public, with some considering Tallafornia to be a cheap copy of other reality television series, such as Jersey Shore, and others calling it an embarrassment to the Irish. Senator David Norris said Tallifornia is guilty of "exploiting young people". On 13 March 2012, he told Seanad Éireann Tallafornia was as a "drink-sodden programme" which encourages its participants to "behave licentiously and compete to bring people home to bed them".

YouTube personalities Peter Ganley and Chris Green produced a web series entitled Tallafornia Swipe in which they watched each episode of the show, humorously commenting upon them and mocking the show's stars. Within weeks the Evening Herald reported that the series was consistently attracting more viewers than Tallafornia itself.

Participant Nikita Murray told Humans of Dublin she regrets appearing on the show, citing inability to find proper work.
