= 5Drama =

British free-to-air digital television channel

- Logo used since 2026
- Country: United Kingdom

Programming
- Language: English
- Picture format: 576i SDTV

Ownership
- Owner: Paramount Networks UK & Australia
- Parent: Channel 5 Broadcasting Limited
- Sister channels: 5; 5Action; 5Star; 5USA

History
- Launched: 21 October 2026
- Replaced: 5Select

Links
- Website: 5Drama

Availability

Terrestrial
- Freeview: Channel 33

5Drama (stylised as 5DRAMA) is a British free-to-air television channel. It launched on 21 October 2026, replacing 5Select. It is owned by Channel 5 Broadcasting Limited, which is owned by Skydance through its Paramount Networks UK & Australia business.

== History ==
On 24 September 2026, Channel 5 Broadcasting Limited announced they would be launching a brand-new TV channel called 5Drama on 21 October 2026. It officially replaced 5Select and switched electronic programming guide (EPG) slot numbers with 5Action. It airs British dramas during its peak times, and shows classic international dramas in the afternoon, including titles from America and Australia.

== Programming ==
- All Creatures Great and Small
- The Au Pair
- Beauty & The Beast
- The Catch
- Cold Call
- Columbo
- Coroner
- The Cuckoo
- Dalgliesh
- The Fortune
- Gilmore Girls
- The Hardacres
- Home and Away
- The House Across the Street
- The Madame Blanc Mysteries
- A Million Little Things
- Murder Before Evensong
- Murder Most Puzzling
- Murder, She Wrote
- Number One Fan
- Prisoner: Cell Block H
- The Rumour
- Taggart
- Walker
- Waterloo Road
