= 5Star =

British digital television channel

- Logo used since 2019
- Country: United Kingdom

Programming
- Language: English
- Picture format: 576i SDTV
- Timeshift service: 5Star +1

Ownership
- Owner: Channel 5 Broadcasting Limited
- Parent: Paramount Networks UK & Australia
- Sister channels: 5; 5USA; 5Drama; 5Action

History
- Launched: 15 October 2006; 20 years ago
- Former names: Five Life (2006–08); Fiver (2008–11); 5* (2011–16)

Links
- Website: 5Star

Availability

Terrestrial
- See separate section

Streaming media
- See separate section

5Star (stylised as 5STAR) is a British free-to-air television channel owned by Channel 5 Broadcasting Limited, a wholly owned subsidiary of Paramount Skydance Corporation, which is grouped under Paramount Networks UK & Australia division. It originally launched as the female-orientated Five Life on 15 October 2006, and was relaunched as Fiver on 28 April 2008 with a revised version of the same concept. The channel was later re-branded as 5* on 7 March 2011, and later, it was re-branded as its current name on 11 February 2016. The network focuses on documentaries, comedy and drama, with original content such as Rich Kids Go Skint and Young, Dumb & Banged Up in the Sun, along with some American and Australian imports.

== History ==
=== 2006-08: Five Life ===
A collage of excerpt images from 5STAR's launch as Five Life c. October 2006.

Five Life was intended to be a female-oriented channel emphasising lifestyle programming. Channel 5 announced that programming on launch would include The Ellen DeGeneres Show, Love My Way, Windfall, Angela's Eyes, and a weekday double-bill of the chat show Trisha Goddard. On 16 October 2006, a day following the channel's launch, Australian soap opera Home and Away began airing from episode 4212 (Season 19, Episode 112). New episodes were shown Monday to Friday in a 'First Look' screening with episodes following the Channel 5 airing. Repeats of popular female-skewing dramas, both nationally and internationally produced, were soon acquired. A time-shift version was launched following the channel's launch in summer 2007.

=== 2008-11: Fiver ===
On 28 April 2008, Five Life was relaunched as Fiver, with a new branding strategy aimed at a younger audience. The rebranding introduced a "younger, faster, louder" concept to compete with Sky Living. The channel adopted a unique on-air presentation featuring a "cursor" motif, which typed out words related to programmes and current events.

=== 2011–16: 5Star ===
In 2011, the channel was re-launched as 5Star (stylised as 5★ or 5*, pronounced "Five Star"). The new brand focused on a "fun-loving" concept, with initial acquisitions including $#*! My Dad Says, Better with You and Parenthood. On 11 April 2011, 5Star reduced its broadcast hours to 13:00 to 00:00, replacing the hours withdrawn with more teleshopping. When some of these new programmes failed to impact the channel's ratings, several were dropped and replaced by new locally-produced and acquired programming. These included the American series 8 Simple Rules, 10 Things I Hate About You, Alphas and The Lying Game.

In 2012, in consort with C5's acquisition of the series, 5Star began airing the Big Brother companion show Big Brother: Live from the House, which aired 60 minutes of live feed following every eviction show. In 2013, after Live from the House set ratings records for the channel, the programme was expanded to two hours nightly. However, ratings were at a share below that of the channel's average, with just 70,000 watching the first live feeds. Subsequently, the live feeds were shut down and the spin-off show last aired in June 2013. Also in 2013, American Idol moved to 5Star from ITV2. Continuing the channel's venture into reality based programming, Tallafornia was acquired from Ireland's TV3 and this was soon joined by Bar Rescue, World's Worst Tenants and Top 20 Funniest in 2014.

The 5Star schedule included a variety of programming, including the aforementioned reality series, as well as the first-run rights to Helix, the second-run rights to American series Falling Skies, Under the Dome and The Walking Dead, and Australian soap operas Home & Away and Neighbours. Popular documentary series shared with C5 air throughout the daytime and primetime hours, such as The Gadget Show.

The time-shift version of the channel was shut down on 3 February 2014 to make way for Channel 5 +24. The channel returned later, launching on Freesat on 16 September 2014 and Sky in the UK and Ireland on 4 November 2014, replacing BET +1 on the platform. The addition of the channel in Ireland was an error; thus, it was removed on 6 November 2014.

On 11 February 2016, as part of an overall re-branding of Channel 5's networks following their acquisition by Viacom, the channel was re-branded as 5Star.

=== 2016 to date: 5Star ===
5Star was initially positioned as a younger skewing channel (like E4). However, 5Star dropped many of its drama and comedy programmes from the schedules and replaced them with blocks of reality TV programming in September 2021. These included medical shows such as Skin A&E, 999: Critical Condition and Don't Tell The Doctor and nights devoted to crime and cleaning showing on other days.

The channel still had several drama shows listed in its schedules for 2021 with imports such as Departure and Wentworth: The Final Sentence broadcast after the watershed and its Australian soaps still broadcast in an hour block from 6 pm (though the 3 pm repeat has been replaced by episodes of Police Interceptors from Paramount Network). 5Star also picked up the free-to-air television rights of streaming series The Act (from StarzPlay via Amazon) which increased its viewing figures on 5Star with each episode broadcast, and Dirty John (also available on Netflix).

Australian soap opera Home and Away has episodes debuting on the channel before being repeated on Channel 5, with other channel premieres including episodes of Killer at the Crime Scene and The Nightmare Neighbour Next Door, as well as several romcom films shown at lunchtime. 5Star usually schedules feature films each Friday, Saturday, and Sunday night, with the whole Saturday daytime schedule traditionally given to family films. However, the quality of some of the movies broadcast by 5Star has been picked up by Kermode and Mayo's Film Review on BBC Radio 5 Live, who have nominated many titles due to be broadcast on the channel, for their 'TV Movie So Bad it's Bad' feature on the show.

On 20 October 2021, their scheduled Love at Lunchtime TV movie premiere slot was discontinued and replaced by back-to-back repeats of various emergency services documentaries with episodes 6 and 7 of Traffic Cops replacing the already announced premiere of Love's Last Resort on that date.

Programmes debuting new episodes on the channel in November 2021 included Filthy House SOS and Oxford Street 24/7, while Nick Knowles' Better Homes is a new show from the presenter of Channel 5's Big House Clearout and Our Secret World was a new commission produced by Viacom Studios UK, featuring Babestation stars like Atlanta Moreno and Jess West enjoying their leisure time in a reality TV format. New-to-Freeview episodes of drama series The Act (from American streaming service Hulu), are debuting weekly on 5Star at 10 pm on a Thursday night before being repeated late night on 5Select a few days later.

From 8 November 2021, after Ofcom approved an hour-long 5 News at 5 on the main channel to fit in Eggheads at 6.30 pm, the early evening repeat of Home and Away moved to 5Star, with the Australian soap now being broadcast in an hour-long slot from 6pm, with the repeat scheduled back-to-back with the 'first look' episode (though the soap went on its regular winter break on Monday 22 November, with the slot being used for repeats of Shoplifters & Scammers: At War with the Law and family films, until a new episode of the soap was broadcast on New Year's Eve).

From 4 December 2021 to 7 November 2022, 5Star began repeating season 11 of Judge Judy in the mornings, at the same time that season 17 was seen on CBS Reality and, due to a simulcast agreement, nine Local TV channels in the UK. A month later, on 4 January 2022, more retro programming from the archives of ViacomCBS appeared on the network, when Zalman King's Red Shoe Diaries (originally broadcast on the American Showtime channel in 1992 and then on Channel 5) started a repeat run in the United Kingdom on 5Star.

== Availability ==
=== Cable ===
- Virgin Media UK: Channel 126 (SD) and Channel 326 (+1)

=== IPTV ===
- Sky Glass UK: Channel 128

=== Online ===
- 5: Watch live

=== Satellite ===
- Freesat UK: Channel 131 (SD) and Channel 141 (+1)
- Sky UK: Channel 128 (SD) and Channel 228 (+1)

=== Terrestrial ===
- Freeview UK: Channel 32

== Ratings ==
The launch of Five Life was at the time ranked as the worst received multichannel launch for a terrestrial broadcaster, only managing to achieve a primetime share of 0.21%. Following the channel's relaunch as Fiver in 2008, the all-day share for the channel was between 0.5 and 0.6%. The highest-rated series airing on 5Star are Home and Away, Neighbours, and the weeknight primetime movie showings. The highest rating for the channel is held by Big Brother: Live from the House, when it received just over one million viewers and an audience share of over five percent in 2013.

== Current programming: 5Star ==
=== First–run ===
- The Act (2021)
- Adults Only (2020–present) (also repeated on Channel 5 and MTV in 2021, and known under the title XXXmas over the festive period)
- Ambulance: Code Red (2020–present)
- Bargain Brits on Benefits (2022–present)
- Cold Case Killers (2021–present)
- Dirty John (2021)
- Don't Tell The Doctor (2017–present)
- Drag Kids (also known as Kids in Drag: We're Fabulous!) (2019–present)
- Entertainment News (2020–present)
- Extreme Hair Wars (2018–present)
- Filthy House SOS
- Get Your Tatts Out: Kavos Ink (2017–present)
- Greatest Ever Movie Blunders (2018–present) (this series was re-edited as a new one-off show for broadcast on Channel 5 in November 2021)
- Greatest Ever TV Blunders (2018–present)
- Home and Away (16 October 2006 – present) (first look)
- Impact Wrestling (2019–present)
- Inside The Mind... (2021) (a celebrity documentary with Dr Bob Johnson)
- It's Your Fault I'm Fat (2019–present)
- Killer at the Crime Scene (2021–present)
- Nick Knowles' Better Home (2021)
- Old School For Lazy Kids (2019–present)
- Our Secret World (2021)
- Oxford Street 24/7 (2021) (a previous series was broadcast first on Channel 5)
- Plastic Surgery Knifemares (2019)
- Prison Life (2018–present)
- Rich Kids Go Homeless (2019–present)
- Rich Kids Go Skint (2018–present)
- Rich Kids, Skint Holiday (2019–present)
- Secret Admirer (2018–present)
- Sex Pod (2016–present)
- The Shocking Truth About Food (2019–present)
- Skin A&E (2021–present)
- Top 20 Funniest (2014–present)
- Tower Block Kids (2018–present)
- Undercover Twins (2019)
- When Kids Kill (2016–present)
- When Teens Kill (2018–present)
- World's Wildest Holidays (2018–present)
- Young, Dumb & Banged Up in the Sun (2018–present)

=== Second–run ===
- 10 Years Younger in 10 Days (2021, Channel 5 series only)
- Absentia
- Bargain-Loving Brits in the Sun
- Britain's Parking Hell (2018–present)
- Casualty 24/7: Every Second Counts
- Fights, Camera, Action! (previously shown on Paramount Network)
- The Following
- Friends (2023–present)
- Departure (2021)
- Judge Judy (episodes from 2006 to 2007, that were previously shown on various CBS branded channels)
- Police Interceptors
- Quantico
- Red Shoe Diaries (episodes from 1992, that were previously shown on Channel 5)
- Suits (season 8 in 2022)
- Supermarket Wars
- The Town the Gypsies Took Over: Appleby Horse Fair (repeated on 5Star on 3 January 2022)
- Wentworth Prison (2016–2021) (this drama debuted in the UK as a Channel 5 show before becoming an exclusive-to-5Star title during its fourth season)
- The World's Most Expensive Hotels

== Former programming: 5Star ==
=== First–run ===
- 100% Hotter (2016–)
- Access (2011–2020) (replaced by Entertainment News)
- Airport 24/7: Thailand (2019–present) (moved to Paramount Network)
- Baby Ballroom (2017–)
- Baby Faced Mums (2016–)
- Badass Brides (2017–)
- Bad Teen to Ballroom Queen (2018–)
- Britain's Naughtiest Nursery (2019–)
- Celebrity Ghost Hunt (2017–)
- Celeb Road Trip: Lost in Transylvania (2018–)
- Celebs on the Farm (2018–present) (moved to MTV)
- Celebs on the Ranch (2019–)
- Channel Zero (2016–)
- Clink (2019–)
- Dirty Tricks (2019–)
- Sing It On (2016–)
- Strip Date (2016–)

=== Second–run ===
- 3rd Rock from the Sun (2019–present)
- 8 Simple Rules (2011, 2017–present)
- 16 and Pregnant (2015–present)
- According to Jim (2017–present)
- Aftermath (2016)
- American Horror Story (2015–present)
- Catfish: The TV Show (2015–present)
- Celebrity Big Brother (2017) (first look episode on Saturdays)
- Dance Moms (2016–present)
- Dance Squad (2017–present)
- Emerald City (2017)
- Empire (2017–present)
- Falling Skies (2013–present)
- Finding Carter (2017–present)
- Fresh Off the Boat (2017–2019)
- The Fresh Prince of Bel-Air (2017–present)
- Gilmore Girls (2013–present)
- Heroes Reborn (2016)
- House (2020)
- Last Man Standing (2018–2020)
- The Magicians (2016–2018)
- My Wife and Kids (2015–present)
- Neighbours (2008–2022)
- Riverdale (2018–present)
- The Shannara Chronicles (2016–2017)
- Smallville (2019–present)
- Star (2017–2018)
- Teen Mom (2015–present)
- Teen Wolf (2015–present)
- That '70s Show (2015–present)
- Two and a Half Men (2018–present) (Seasons 1–8 only)
- Under the Dome (2013–present)
- Will & Grace (2018–present)
- You're the Worst (2016–present)

== Former programming: Fiver and 5* ==
- $#*! My Dad Says (2010–2011)
- 10 Things I Hate About You (2011)
- Almost Live from Studio Five (2009)
- Alphas (2011–2012)
- Angela's Eyes (2006)
- Archer (2010–2014)
- Bad Girls (2007–2009)
- BAMMA (2013–2015) (moved to 5Spike)
- Bar Rescue (2014–2015) (moved to 5Spike)
- Better with You (2010)
- Big Brother: Live from the House (2013, 2015)
- Big Brother's Bit on the Side (2013, 2015)
- Big Love (2009)
- Californication (2008–2012)
- Celebrity Big Brother: Live from the House (2013, 2015)
- Celebrity Big Brother's Bit on the Side (2013, 2015)
- Celebrity Rehab (2009)
- Chuck (2011–2012)
- Colin and Justin's How Not to Decorate (2007)
- Dawson's Creek (2006–2009)
- Dirt (2009–2011)
- The Ellen DeGeneres Show (2006–2007, 2008)
- Eye Candy (2015)
- Farmer Wants a Wife (2009–2010)
- Fifth Gear (2007–2010)
- Floogals (2017)
- Footballers' Wives (2007–2010)
- Gay, Straight or Taken? (2008)
- Helix (2014) (moved to 5Spike)
- Joey (2009)
- Love My Way (2006–2007)
- The Lying Game (2012–2013)
- Malcolm in the Middle (2011–2013) (now on Comedy Central)
- Make Me a Supermodel Extra (2007–2008)
- Minder (2009)
- My Name Is Earl (2013–2015) (moved to 5USA)
- Nice House, Shame About the Garden! (2008–2010)
- Ocean Force (2008–2010)
- Out of the Blue (2009–2010)
- Parenthood (2010–2011)
- Pingu (2017–2018)
- Rich Bride, Poor Bride (2009)
- Ridiculousness (2015–2017)
- Scrubs (2015–2016) (moved from Viva)
- Sex and the City (2009–2013)
- Sofia's Diary (2008–2009)
- South Park (2017)
- SpongeBob SquarePants (2017)
- Step It Up and Dance (2007)
- Stylista (2007–2008)
- Tallafornia (2014)
- The Trisha Goddard Show (2006–2010)
- Trust Me – I'm a Beauty Therapist (2006)
- Vets in Action (2009–2011)
- The Walking Dead (2012–2014) (moved to 5Spike)
- Windfall (2006)
- World's Worst Tenants (2014–2015)
- The Wright Stuff (2009–2011)

== Former logos ==
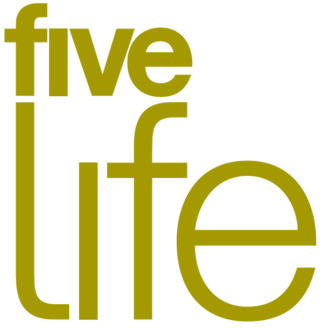
Five Life logo
(15 October 2006 – 27 April 2008)

First Fiver logo
(28 April – 6 October 2008)

Final Fiver logo
(7 October 2008 – 7 March 2011)

5* logo
(7 March 2011 – 11 February 2016)

5Star logo
(11 February 2016 – 1 September 2019)
