= BET International =

International channels of BET Networks

- Country: United Kingdom
- Broadcast area: South Korea; Previously available in: United Kingdom; Ireland; Asia-Pacific; Europe; France (distribution); Sub-Saharan Africa; MENA
- Network: BET
- Headquarters: London, England

Programming
- Languages: English; Arabic; Korean
- Picture format: 16:9 1080i HDTV

Ownership
- Owner: Paramount International Networks

History
- Launched: 27 February 2008; 18 years ago 1 December 2015; 10 years ago (South Africa, Sub-Saharan Africa, MENA); 26 September 2017; 8 years ago (South Korea)
- Closed: 8 April 2021; 5 years ago (UK & Ireland); 1 January 2026; 8 months ago (South Africa, Sub-Saharan Africa, MENA)

Links
- Website: www.betafrica.tv

Availability

Terrestrial
- GOtv (Sub-Saharan Africa): Channel 21
- DStv (Sub-Saharan Africa): Channel 129

BET International (Black Entertainment Television) was an international television channel centred towards black culture. It was available in Africa, along with the Middle East/North Africa region. It was launched on 28 February 2008 in the UK and on 1 December 2015 with headquarters in London. BET broadcast content from the main Black Entertainment Television channel in the United States. No UK-originated content was ever produced for the channel.

== History ==
BET International Inc. was given a licence to broadcast in the UK in May 2007 by Ofcom. In 2006 it was announced that BET would hold its first annual Hip-Hop Awards and as part of the announcement they also stated there would be a "Best UK Artist" category, the winner being Sway.

=== Availability ===
BET launched on the Sky platform in the UK on 27 February 2008, one day earlier than it originally advertised. It began with various BET content, such as 106 & Park, American Gangster and College Hill. The channel is available on Sky Channel 194. The channel launched on Freesat in August 2008 on Channel 140. BET +1 was added to Freesat when it launched in late 2008. These signals are also available for free in the rest of Europe via satellite Eutelsat 28A. At the start of July 2009, a temporary HD event channel for the BET Awards 2009 was carried by Freesat.

BET Africa was available in Kenya on Zuku TV on Channel 125 and on StarTimes on Channel 132.

The channel was available on the Pan-African satellite broadcaster DStv on Channel 135 until 2 April 2015 when it was replaced with a domestic BET feed, which includes local shows alongside BET International's programming.

BET International was removed from StarSat in South Africa, and StarTimes across Africa on 30 November 2015.

On 4 November 2014, BET +1 closed, and was replaced by 5* +1 on Sky.

On 26 September 2017, BET launched in South Korea through SK Broadband on their IPTV service B TV and their over-the-top streaming service oksusu.

In 2018, BET Africa was added to GOtv Channel 21.

On 5 May 2020, BET was removed from Freesat.

It was announced on 30 March 2021 that BET would shut down as a linear TV channel on 8 April 2021 in the UK & Ireland. BET International's content was disbursed among the My5 and Pluto TV streaming services, and will also be carried on Paramount+ upon its 2022 pan-European launch. The channel still broadcasts in Africa as of October 2022.

On 22 July 2025, it was reported that Paramount Global was looking to close its African offices with channels like MTV Base and BET Africa shutting down. The channel was shut down on January 1, 2026 in South Africa, Sub-Saharan Africa and MENA following its restructuring policy by Paramount Skydance due to low ratings.

== Programming ==
The network aired most of the programming originated and produced by the American BET network, along with select programmes from MTV and VH1. It also carried acquired Black-focused American and British sitcoms which originally aired on terrestrial networks in both countries.
