= Channel 5 Broadcasting Limited =

American media company headquartered in London

- Logo used since 2016
- Type: Subsidiary
- Industry: Mass media
- Founded: 17 January 1996; 30 years ago
- Headquarters: 17–29 Hawley Crescent, London, England
- Area served: United Kingdom; Ireland; Isle of Man; Guernsey; Jersey
- Key people: Ben Frow (Chief Content Officer, UK at Paramount)
- Owner: Skydance
- Parent: Skydance UK
- Website: skydance.com/about/brands/5

Channel 5 Broadcasting Limited is a British media company and wholly owned subsidiary of American media conglomerate Skydance, as part of its Skydance UK division. Its original and principal activity is the British national television channel 5, however it now also consists of four other digital channels and its own streaming service.

== History ==
=== Launch ===
Channel 5 Broadcasting Limited was licensed by the UK's then-independent statutory regulator the Independent Television Commission (ITC) in 1995 after a bidding process that started in 1993 and lasted throughout 1994. The initial round of bidders, which included a network of Citytv stations planned by Thames Television and the Italian politician and media tycoon Silvio Berlusconi (who founded MFE - MediaForEurope, which owns Canale 5 and formerly owned La Cinq, which ceased operations in 1992; he retired his offer a few months later), was rejected outright and the ITC contemplated not awarding the licence at all.

The difficulty with the project lay in use of television broadcast frequencies that had been allocated to RF outputs from domestic videocassette recorders. To achieve national coverage, large numbers of domestic video recorders (which output at a nearby frequency) had to be retuned or fitted with a filter, at the bidding company's expense.

The project was revived in mid-1994 when the ITC re-advertised the franchise. Tom McGrath, then-president of Time Warner International Broadcasting, put together a revised frequency plan with NTL and consulting engineer Ellis Griffiths, involving less retuning and greater signal coverage. Lord Hollick, then chief executive of Meridian Broadcasting (later United News & Media, and UBM) took up the project as lead investor as UK law prohibited Time Warner from owning more than 25%. Pearson Television, who by now owned original licence bidders Thames Television, also came on board. When McGrath left to become President of Paramount, Time Warner dropped out of the project and was replaced by the Compagnie Luxembourgeoise de Télédiffusion (CLT, known in the UK for Radio Luxembourg under CLT's former name of the Compagnie Luxembourgeoise de Radiodiffusion, CLR). Other bidders for the licence included UKTV (led by Canwest and Select TV, who bid £36m for the licence), New Century Television (owned by BSkyB and Granada, who bid £2m), Virgin TV (backed by Virgin Communications) and Associated Newspapers (who bid £22m, the same as Channel 5 Broadcasting who won the licence).

A series of pre-launch screens were displayed on the frequencies Channel 5 would begin broadcasting on in the months before launch as well, including a trailer for the channel and information screens. After re-tuning, around 65% of the population's televisions could view the channel on launch night.

=== Growth and merger talks (2000–2010) ===
On 27 February 2004, it was reported that Five and Channel 4 were discussing a possible merger. Channel 4 and Five announced in November of that year that merger plans were being called off. Pearson Television and CLT (which by that time merged with the television businesses of Bertelsmann's UFA to form CLT-UFA) later merged, becoming RTL Group which became part of Bertelsmann and therefore owned the channel, after buying UBM's 35.4% stake for £247.6 million on 20 July 2005. The acquisition was approved on 26 August 2005. After Holleck became involved, he and McGrath brought on board Greg Dyke (later Director-General of the BBC) as interim CEO during the application and launch phase of the project.

On 18 November 2005, it was announced that Five had bought a stake in DTT's pay-TV operator, Top Up TV. It was said that the investment may lead to the development of new free and pay services on DTT, and other platforms.

Following this, Five launched two new digital TV channels in autumn 2006 on Freeview, Sky and Virgin Media: Early in 2009, rumours started re-surfacing about Five, Channel 4 and ITV conducting a three-way merger. Talks continued into 2010, with and without ITV, however nothing came to fruition.

=== Northern & Shell takeover (2010–2011) ===
Five was taken over by Richard Desmond's publishing group Northern & Shell on 23 July 2010 for £103.5 million. Desmond pledged to top up the broadcaster's total budget to about £1.5bn over the next five years, including new investment of £50m to £100m a year to boost programming and the equivalent of £20m promoting the channel and its shows in a marketing campaign in Northern & Shell publications. The takeover was partly motivated by the opportunities for cross-promotion of Five from Desmond's newspapers (Daily Express and Daily Star) and magazines (including OK!). One commentator warned that "readers will be bombarded with references to Five. The opportunity for cross-promotion between his publications and TV channel are enormous."

=== Sale to Viacom and Paramount changes (2014–present) ===
In January 2014, it was reported that Richard Desmond was looking at selling Channel 5 for up to £700 million. BT, ITV, Channel 4, NBCUniversal, Endemol, Time Warner, Viacom, Scripps Network Interactive, Saban Capital Group, and joint bid of BSkyB and Discovery Communications were all bidders reportedly interested in acquiring Channel 5.

On 1 May 2014, Desmond agreed to sell Channel 5 to Viacom for £450 million (US$759 million). The deal was approved on 10 September 2014 and at the same time it was announced that it was to co-commission programmes with its pay channels such as Nickelodeon and MTV. On 15 April 2015, Channel 5 launched a British version of the American cable channel Spike (which would become rebranded as 5Spike, before taking on the Paramount Network name on Freeview channel 32). On 1 August 2015, Channel 5's five advertising regions: London, South/Central England and Wales, Northern England, Scotland, and Northern Ireland were closed with Viacom considering them financially unviable. The closure of the advertising regions allowed Channel 5 HD for Sky HD viewers to swap with the standard-definition version of Channel 5 on the EPG.

Under Viacom, the channel planned to increase its original programming output, increasing its budget by 10%. On 11 February 2016, Channel 5 also unveiled an overhauled brand, meant to reflect a new remit of "Spirited TV with an Emotional Heart".

In December 2019, Viacom merged with CBS Corporation, forming ViacomCBS and making Channel 5 a sister to CBS in the United States and Network 10 in Australia. Since January 2020, the channels operate under the ViacomCBS Networks UK & Australia subsidiary (with the British CBS channels and Horror being part of a joint-venture with AMC). Channel 5 received Channel of the Year honours from the Royal Television Society and Broadcast Awards in 2020, with judges for both recognising the network's expansion under ViacomCBS.

In August 2021, ViacomCBS Networks International agreed a deal with Comcast's Sky Group to launch the Paramount+ streaming service in various European markets via Sky's set-top boxes (including Sky Q) and devices. As there could have been the situation where a premium pay streaming service with the Paramount name was operating in a marketplace where there was a free-to-air Paramount television channel offering emergency service reality TV shows, wrestling and action B-movies, it was decided to rename the channel (which had previously merged with 5Spike) as 5Action, with the change due to take place on 19 January 2022. The rebrand, to realign Freeview channel 32 with that of its parent channel once again, was announced in December 2021, around the same time that it was announced that Channel 5 had joined Digital UK (now Everyone TV), the organisation responsible for Freeview and Freesat, becoming the last of the UK's major Public Service Broadcasters to join the body.

== Operations ==
=== Channels ===
Channel	Type	Launched	Purpose
5	Free-to-air public broadcast television channel	30 March 1997	Fifth national terrestrial channel in the United Kingdom
5Action	Wholly owned	19 January 2022	Was originally launched on 4 July 2018 as Paramount Network before rebrand. Programming focuses on action and crime. During NFL on CBS games starting in 2025, branded as 5NFL.
5Drama	Wholly owned	21 October 2026	Launched on 21 October 2026, replacing 5Select. Programming focuses on British dramas, Australian soap operas and American imports.
5Star	Wholly owned	11 February 2016	Was originally launched as Five Life on 15 October 2006. Became Fiver on 28 April 2008 & then 5* on 7 March 2011 before current rebrand. Programming focuses on documentaries, comedies & dramas.
5USA	Wholly owned	7 March 2011	Was originally launched as Five US on 16 October 2006. Became Five USA on 16 February 2009 before current rebrand. Programming focuses on imported movies and programmes from the United States.

=== 5 (streaming service) ===
5 streaming service logo since 2025

5 (previously Five Download and later Demand Five then Demand 5 and My5) is the brand name of video-on-demand services offered by Channel 5 in the United Kingdom. The service went live on 26 June 2008.
