= 5Action =

British television channel

- Logo used since 2022
- Country: United Kingdom
- Broadcast area: United Kingdom

Programming
- Language: English
- Picture format: 1080i HDTV; (downscaled to 576i for the SDTV feed)

Ownership
- Owner: Paramount Networks UK & Australia
- Parent: Channel 5 Broadcasting Limited
- Sister channels: 5; 5Drama; 5Star; 5USA

History
- Launched: 4 July 2018; 8 years ago (as Paramount Network); 19 January 2022; 4 years ago (as 5Action)
- Replaced: 5Spike
- Former names: Paramount Network (2018–2022)

Links
- Website: 5Action

Availability

Terrestrial
- Freeview: Channel 46
- Freesat: Channel 133

5Action (stylized as 5ACTION) is a British free-to-air television channel owned by Channel 5 Broadcasting Limited, a wholly owned subsidiary of Paramount Skydance Corporation, which is grouped under Paramount Networks UK & Australia division. 5Action features a range of programming from the Channel 5 stable as well as other content from the UK and US, focusing on action and crime, aiming towards a male audience.

== History ==
5Action's programming and Freeview channel slot dates back to the days of Viacom's male-skewing channel Spike, which was launched on 15 April 2015 as a localised version of the American network of the same name. When Spike was launched it took the channel space of Viva, but was operated under the auspices of Channel 5's programming director Ben Frow. It primarily aired entertainment programmes, including action and drama series, police documentaries, and programming from its U.S. counterpart, as well as mixed martial arts.

On 31 October 2017, the channel became 5Spike after Viacom decided the channel should be more closely associated with its sister channels and the Channel 5 brand. On 7 January 2020, the brand was discontinued in line with Viacom's global company policy, with the channel taking on the name of its sister channel, Paramount Network, and with major change to its channel placement or programming.

On 19 January 2022, the channel was once again re-aligned to a Channel 5-specific brand, as 5Action to avert confusion with Paramount+. On 26 January 2022, 5Action shifted to Freeview 33 to accommodate the new iteration of BBC Three on 1 February 2022. On 21 October 2026, the channel would shift EPG slots again to Freeview 46 following the launch of 5Drama.

Paramount Network Logo used 4 July 2018 – 18 January 2022, which was coincidentally the 4th anniversary of the Paramount Network brand.

Paramount Network logo without the mountain, used from 4 July 2018 to 18 January 2022, which was coincidentally the 4th anniversary of the Paramount Network brand.

== Programming ==
=== Current programming ===
- Treadstone
- Shooter
- Quantum Leap (season 1, first shown on Paramount+)
- Beacon 23 (season 1 from 14 January, first shown on Paramount+)
- Airport 24/7: Thailand
- Car Crash TV
- Caught on Camera (episodes might be billed as Criminals: Caught on Camera or Seconds from Death: Caught on Camera)
- Cruise TV by LoveitBookit
- Entertainment News on 5
- Fights, Camera, Action
- Idiot TV
- Police Interceptors (some episodes known as Ultimate Police Interceptors)
- Police Raids: Caught by Surprise
- Traffic Cops
- The Transporter
- The World's Deadliest Weather
- Trucking Hell
- NFL on CBS (live game broadcasts, channel is branded 5NFL during their airtime; officially CBS Sports)

=== Former programming ===
- Access
- Aftermath
- Agent Carter
- American Horror Story
- Arrow
- Channel Zero
- CSI: Miami
- CSI: NY
- Designated Survivor
- Empire
- Gilmore Girls
- Grimm
- Heroes Reborn
- Home and Away
- House
- Impractical Jokers US
- LA to Vegas
- Lip Sync Battle US
- Life in Pieces
- Neighbours
- Six
- Sleepy Hollow
- Suits
- Taken
- Training Day
- Teen Wolf
- The Mick
- The Office US
- The Strain
- Vikings
- When Calls the Heart
- Will & Grace
- WWE Raw Highlights
- WWE SmackDown Highlights
- Wynonna Earp
- The X-Files
- Yellowstone (season 1 and 2 only, moved to Paramount+)

== Paramount Network ==
Viacom (ViacomCBS/Channel 5) operated two distinct versions of the free-to-air Paramount Network on Freeview (with the original pay-tv Paramount Channel becoming Comedy Central in 2009). The first version of the Freeview channel was launched on 4 July 2018. as a sister channel to 5Spike, and with a high-definition feed exclusively on Virgin Media from 21 July 2018. It ceased to be available via satellite in Ireland on 13 July 2018 despite the channel being promoted to Irish viewers before launch (however, the channel could still be accessed via manual tuning on Sky in Ireland).

On 7 January 2020, Paramount Network was merged with 5Spike in its slots on Freeview, Sky and Virgin Media, got its new branding, and subsumed its +1 timeshift channel on Sky. The timeshift channel ceased broadcasting on 14 July 2020.

Paramount Network rebranded as 5Action on 19 January 2022 in preparation for Paramount+ launching in the UK.

=== Programming ===
The original British version of Paramount Network was as a general entertainment channel showing American movies and series such as Suits and Lip Sync Battle. In 2020, Channel 5 merged this channel with that of 5Spike, with Paramount Network becoming more of a male-skewing channel, following the lead of the original American Spike TV, which targeted a young adult male audience, becoming Paramount Network in the United States. This second version of Paramount Network had a schedule very much in keeping with that of 5Spike, with action movies at night, westerns at lunch and programmes such as Police Interceptors and Traffic Cops running episodes back-to-back early evening. When the channel got its second rebrand in early 2022, again no major changes were made to the schedule yet on Freeview channel 32 apart from the Jason Bourne spin-off Treadstone debuting on the channel.

=== Former programming (Paramount Network) ===
==== Original version ====
- Access
- Aftermath
- Agent Carter
- American Horror Story
- Arrow
- Channel Zero
- CSI: Miami
- CSI: NY
- Designated Survivor
- Empire
- Gilmore Girls
- Grimm
- Heroes Reborn
- Home and Away
- House
- Impractical Jokers US
- LA to Vegas
- Lip Sync Battle US
- Life in Pieces
- Neighbours
- Six
- Sleepy Hollow
- Suits
- Taken
- Training Day
- Teen Wolf
- The Mick
- The Office US
- The Strain
- Vikings
- When Calls the Heart
- Will & Grace
- Wynonna Earp
- The X-Files

==== Second version (formally 5Spike) ====
Programmes broadcast on the male-skewing version included:

- Access
- Airwolf (now broadcast on ViacomCBS/AMC's Legend channel)
- The A-Team
- Can't Pay? We'll Take It Away
- Caught on Camera (episodes might be billed as Criminals: Caught on Camera or Seconds from Death: Caught on Camera)
- Gangland
- Fights, Camera, Action
- The Gadget Show
- Knight Rider
- Michael McIntyre's Big Show (this format was produced by Sky Vision, and was originally broadcast on BBC One)
- NXT UK Highlights
- Police Interceptors (some episodes known as Ultimate Police Interceptors)
- Police Raids: Caught by Surprise
- Raw Recruits: Squaddies at 16
- Sewermen
- Street Hawk
- Tsunami (with Dr Xand van Tulleken and Raksha Dave)
- Traffic Cops
- Trucking Hell
- WWE Raw Highlights
- WWE SmackDown Highlights
- The X-Files
- Yellowstone
