= 5 (British TV channel) =

British free-to-air channel owned by Skydance

- Yellow version of the 2016 logo, used since 2025

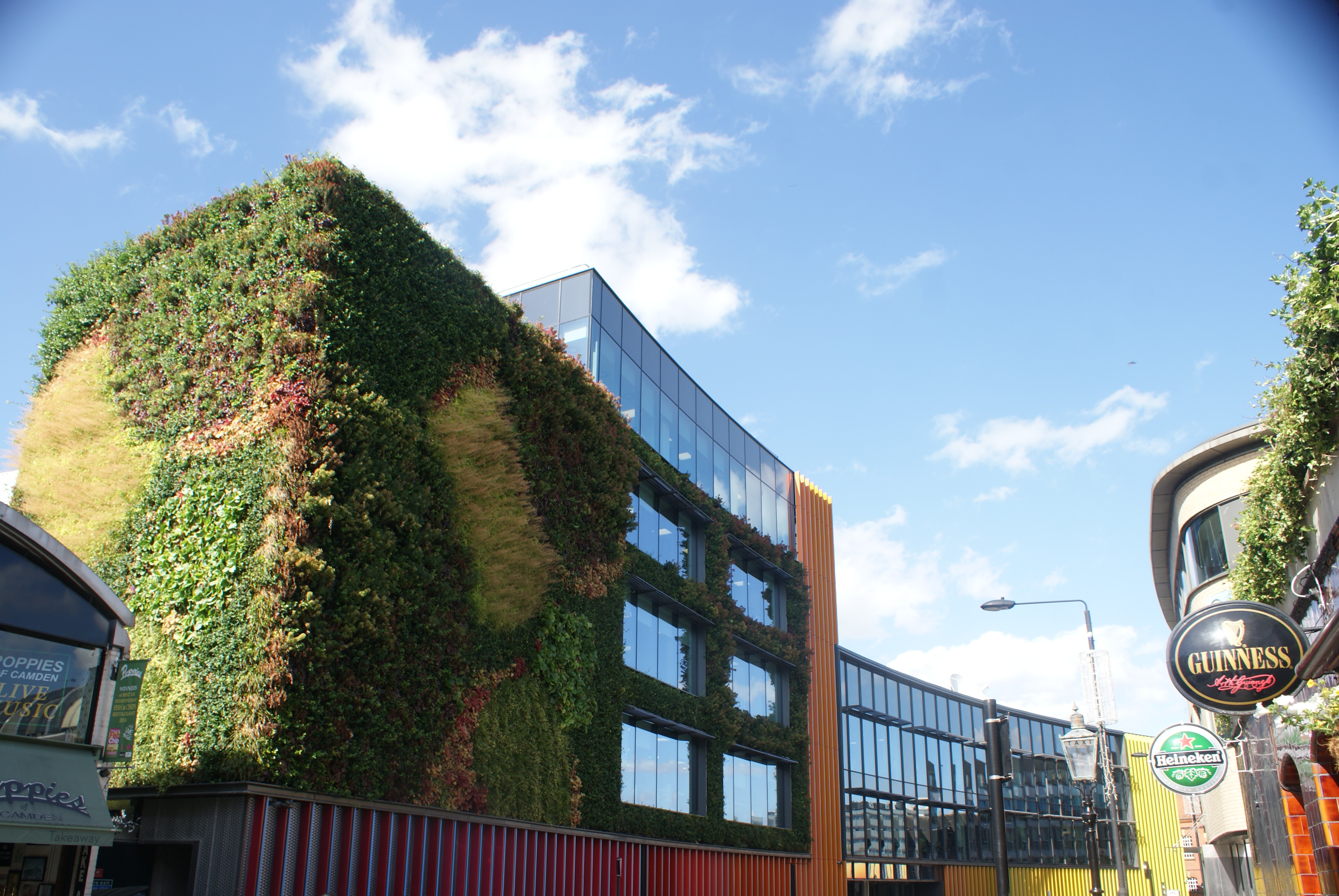
- Country: United Kingdom
- Broadcast area: United Kingdom; Ireland; Isle of Man; Channel Islands; Gibraltar; Sealand
- Headquarters: Breakfast Television Centre, London, England

Programming
- Language: English
- Picture format: High-definition television 1080i/1080p (Note: 1080p25 sometimes only on Freeview.); (downscaled to 576i for the SD feed)
- Timeshift service: 5 +1

Ownership
- Owner: Skydance (Skydance UK)
- Parent: Channel 5 Broadcasting Limited
- Sister channels: 5Action; 5Drama; 5Star; 5USA; Milkshake!

History
- Launched: 30 March 1997; 29 years ago
- Former names: Channel 5 (1997–2002; 2011–2025); Five (2002–2011)

Links
- Website: www.channel5.com

Availability

Terrestrial
- See separate section

Streaming media
- 5: See separate section

5 (formerly known as Channel 5 (Note: The channel is still being referred to as "Channel 5" outside of the broadcaster.) and Five) is a British free-to-air public broadcast television channel owned and operated by Channel 5 Broadcasting Limited, a wholly owned subsidiary of Skydance's UK division. It was launched on 30 March 1997 to provide a fifth national terrestrial channel in the United Kingdom.

Channel 5 was renamed Five, from 16 September 2002 until 13 February 2011. Most of this was under the RTL Group's ownership with Richard Desmond purchasing the channel on 23 July 2010 and reverting the name change. On 1 May 2014, the channel was acquired by Viacom for £450 million (US$759 million). Channel 5 was rebranded as 5 on 12 March 2025 along with its streaming service.

It is a general entertainment channel that shows internally commissioned programmes such as The Drowning, All Creatures Great and Small and Ben Fogle: New Lives in the Wild. The channel has also relied on imports from the United States, including the CSI franchise, the NCIS franchise, the first three series in the Law & Order franchise, Power Rangers, The Mentalist, Body of Proof, Once Upon a Time, Dallas, Under the Dome, and sitcom Friends.

== History ==
=== Pre-launch ===
Wolff Olins and Saatchi & Saatchi were the main companies behind the pre-launch advertising campaign: "Give Me 5". The channel would be both modern and mainstream. A logo (a numeric "5" within a circle) and visual motif (a "candy stripe" bar of colours, reminiscent of TV test cards) were used, and through the spring of 1997 billboards of Jack Docherty and other Channel 5 stars were displayed.

A series of pre-launch screens were displayed on the frequencies Channel 5 would begin broadcasting on in the months before launch as well, including a trailer for the channel and information screens. After re-tuning, around 65% of the population's televisions could view the channel on launch night, and a month after launch, the channel launched on satellite to provide coverage to the rest of the UK.

=== Launch and RTL Group ownership ===
The channel's launch on 30 March 1997 (Easter Sunday) at 6 p.m. After a brief voice over by continuity presenter David Vickery, the first broadcast was the Spice Girls singing a cover version of Manfred Mann's hit "5-4-3-2-1" as "1-2-3-4-5", for which they were reportedly paid around £500,000. Presenters Tim Vine and Julia Bradbury were the first people to introduce the nation to the UK's fifth terrestrial channel with half an hour of previews.

The rest of the Channel 5 launch night schedule, along with the official viewing figures, was as follows:

| Time | Show | Viewers (in millions) |
|---|---|---|
| 6 pm | This Is 5! | 2.49 |
| 6:30 pm | Family Affairs | 1.70 |
| 7 pm | Two Little Boys | 0.68 |
| 8 pm | Hospital! | 1.12 |
| 9 pm | Beyond Fear | 1.70 |
| 10:30 pm | The Jack Docherty Show | 1.16 |
| 11:10 pm | The Comedy Store Special | 0.73 |
| 11:40 pm | Turnstyle | 0.49 |
| 12:10 am | Live and Dangerous | 0.08 |
| 4:40 am | Prisoner: Cell Block H | 0.03 |
| 5:30 am | This is 5! | 0.03 |

Overall, an estimated 2,490,000 tuned in to see Britain's fifth free channel launch, a figure higher than that achieved by the launch of Channel 4, fourteen and a half years earlier.

The first advert shown on Channel 5 was for Chanel No. 5 perfume.

==== Re-brand as Five (2002) ====
On 16 September 2002, Channel 5 re-branded to Five, in a multimillion-pound project directed by Trevor Beattie. The channel's director of marketing at the time, David Pullen, said:

This campaign set out to achieve three key objectives: to clarify the channel's creative strategy; to refresh the channel's on-screen identity; and to address the gap between the common perceptions of Five and the new reality of our programming – stimulating viewers' reappraisal of Five's programmes and brand. Channel 5 was a name; 'Five' is a brand. 'Five' as a brand reflects the evolution the channel is undergoing in programming and in becoming a more confident and distinctive viewer proposition.

By 2005, Five's growth has been rapid, but it was still operating a single channel, unlike the BBC and its commercial competitors. Some of its spectrum on Freeview was leased to pay-TV operator Top Up TV, which would outweigh the cost of launching a new Five-branded free-to-air channel.

=== Northern & Shell ownership (2010) ===
Five was taken over by Richard Desmond's publishing group Northern & Shell on 23 July 2010 for £103.5 million. Desmond pledged to top up the broadcaster's total budget to about £1.5bn over the next five years, including new investment of £50m to £100m a year to boost programming and the equivalent of £20m promoting the channel and its shows in a marketing campaign in Northern & Shell publications.

Upon completing his takeover of Five on 23 July 2010, Richard Desmond remarked; "I prefer Channel 5 to Five, but... we haven't met with the team yet to discuss these sorts of details". The day after, Desmond's Daily Express newspaper noted that the channel's name was to change: "From today the rather vague 'Five' (Five what? Days of the week? Fingers?) reverts to the much more informative Channel 5". On 11 August 2010, Desmond confirmed the restoration of the original name used from 1997 to 2002. The restoration was revealed onscreen on 14 February 2011.

The relaunch also saw investment in a range of new programming with the debut of the (now-cancelled) nightly entertainment show OK! TV. Audience figures for the relaunch were boosted with increased viewing figures for the main 5 News bulletins and improved figures for OK! TV in the 6.30 pm slot over its predecessor Live from Studio Five. On 18 August 2011, Channel 5 relaunched Big Brother, starting with Celebrity Big Brother 8 and followed by Big Brother 12, having bought the rights to air the programme in April 2011 following its 2010 cancellation by Channel 4. The deal was worth a reported £200 million. The show helped the channel's viewing figures and audience share to rise slightly year-on-year, from 4.4% to 4.5%, in 2012. It was only achieved by Channel 5 and BBC One later in 2012; all other terrestrial broadcasters fell in comparison.

In 2013, Ben Frow, the channel's Director of Programming, revealed that the station would be moving away from broadcasting just American imports, by introducing shows from other countries such as Canada, Ireland and Australia to the schedules. The station has since begun screening the Australian prison drama Wentworth Prison and the Irish gangland series Love/Hate.

=== Viacom/Paramount Global/Paramount Skydance Corporation/Skydance Corporation ownership (2014–present) ===
In January 2014, it was reported that Richard Desmond was looking at selling Channel 5 for up to £700 million. On 1 May 2014, Desmond agreed to sell Channel 5 to Viacom through its international networks division Viacom International Media Networks for £450 million (US$759 million). The deal was approved on 10 September 2014 and at the same time, it was announced that it was to co-commission programmes with its pay channels such as Nickelodeon and MTV.

Under Viacom, the channel planned to increase its original programming output, increasing its budget by 10%. On 11 February 2016, Channel 5 also unveiled an overhauled brand, meant to reflect a new remit of "Spirited TV with an Emotional Heart".

In December 2019, Viacom merged with CBS Corporation, forming ViacomCBS (later Paramount Global, then Paramount Skydance, and now Skydance) and making Channel 5 a sister to CBS in the United States and Network 10 in Australia. Channel 5 received Channel of the Year honours from the Royal Television Society and Broadcast Awards in 2020, with judges for both recognising the network's expansion under ViacomCBS.

On 20 August 2024, it was reported that Paramount was planning a rebrand of Channel 5 to occur in early 2025, which would see its on-air name shortened back to "5". In addition, catch-up platform My5 would also be consolidated under the "5" branding to unify its linear and streaming outlets, following the lead of Channel 4. In addition, plans to consolidate Pluto TV with My5 were shelved. The rebrand took place on 12 March 2025 and pre‑launch promotional material featuring the same '5' logo in a new yellow colour appeared on public transport locations around London.

== Availability ==
=== Cable ===
- Virgin Media UK: Channel 105 (HD) and Channel 305 (+1)

=== IPTV ===
- Sky Glass UK: Channel 105 (HD)
- Freely UK: Channel 5 (HD)

=== Online ===
- TVPlayer
- Sky Go
- Virgin TV Go
- Pluto TV

=== Satellite ===
- Freesat UK: Channel 105 (HD) and Channel 128 (+1)
- Sky UK: Channel 105 (HD) and Channel 205 (+1)

=== Terrestrial ===
- Freeview UK: Channel 5 (SD), Channel 38 (+1) and Channel 105 (HD)

== Broadcasting and reception ==
The British frequency plan had only allowed for four channels to be transmitted over the whole of the UK using analogue terrestrial transmitters, but the ITC identified that UHF channels 35 and 37 could provide coverage for around 70% of the UK population. These channels were used by many domestic video recorders for RF connection to television sets. Before the channel could launch, the broadcaster had to provide over-the-phone instructions or visit any home that complained, to either retune the video recorder or fit a filter to completely block the Channel 5 signal.

For many transmitters, channels 35 and 37 were 'out of the group', which meant that the roof-top receiving aerials were not designed to cover Channel 5's broadcast channels. Many people either could not receive the channel at all or required a new aerial. The broadcaster progressively added to the transmitters to improve the analogue terrestrial coverage since that time. From 23 April 1997, the channel was also provided on the analogue Astra satellite service, which enabled people outside the terrestrial reception areas to receive it via a dish.

Unlike the other four analogue British television channels, the channel could not be received via analogue terrestrial broadcasts in many areas, including some parts of the south coast of England where the signal would otherwise interfere with signals from television stations in France; many areas of North East England, especially around the major Tyne & Wear conurbation; many areas in Scotland; most of Wales, most of Northern Ireland and parts of Cumbria. The channel is available on all digital platforms (Freesat, Sky satellite, IPTV and Freeview digital terrestrial, and also most cable operators). On 5 November 2008, the channel launched on digital satellite service Freesat, on the Astra 28.2°E satellites.

It was the first terrestrial channel in the UK to use a permanent digital on-screen graphic, though this was removed in September 2002; however, the children's programming strands kept the DOG. In October 2007, the channel's logo returned to the screen.

Channel 5 is available in Switzerland on Swisscom TV and Cablecom.

On 30 September 2009, the channel temporarily ceased broadcasting on Freeview from around 9:30 am until midday. This was due to changes to the Freeview platform, which necessitated moving Channel 5 from a commercial multiplex to a public service broadcasting multiplex. This was to increase the coverage of the channel from around 70% to 99% of the country by using relay transmitters: these only carried the three PSB multiplexes but did not carry the three commercial multiplexes.

On 20 September 2019, it was announced that Channel 5 had joined BritBox, a digital video subscription service created by the BBC and ITV.

On 11 December 2023, terrestrial broadcasts to the Falkland Islands began on all local BFBS platforms, replacing BFBS Extra.

== Subsidiary channels ==
=== 5 HD ===
HD logo since March 2025

5 HD is a high-definition simulcast of 5. The channel launched on Sky Channel 171 and Virgin Media channel 150 on 13 July 2010. In the Summer of 2015, Channel 5 and Channel 5 HD switched places, with Channel 5 HD now being located in Channel 5's original space of Channel 105.

Upon the launch, only the Australian soaps Neighbours and Home and Away were shown in HD, with the letters HD placed in the top right-hand corner of the screen.

Channel 5 HD was due to launch on Freeview in 2010 but was unable to reach the 'key criteria' to keep its slot. In 2011 Channel 5 HD was the sole applicant for a fifth high-definition channel slot on Freeview, intending to launch in spring or early summer 2012. On 15 December 2011, Channel 5 dropped its bid to take the fifth slot after being unable to resolve "issues of commercial importance". Channel 5 said it "remains committed" to having an HD channel on Freeview in the future.

In October 2013, Channel 5 HD became a subscription channel on the Sky satellite platform. Previously, it was available as a free-to-view channel, but is now only available to Sky 'Family Bundle' customers or those with the HD pack.

On 27 April 2016, Channel 5 HD test transmissions started on Freeview Mux. BBCB (CH105).

On 4 May 2016, Channel 5 HD became free-to-air, coinciding with its launch on Freeview and Freesat.

=== 5 +1 ===
Timeshift logo since 2025

The time-shifted 5 +1 was launched on Freesat, Freeview and Sky on 6 December 2011. The channel was also expected to be made available via Virgin Media during 2012, eventually launching on 25 October 2012. As with other similar '+1' services, Channel 5 +1 rebroadcasts Channel 5's entire programming output on a one-hour time delay, though the 'Supercasino' commercial gaming block is blacked out on the timeshift. The launch of Channel 5 +1 meant all three of the UK's commercial PSB services – ITV/STV/UTV, Channel 4 and Channel 5 – now have one-hour timeshifts.

On 2 March 2026, Channel 5 announced it was going to cease SD broadcasting on Sky. This change took place on 5 March 2026.

== Idents ==
=== 1997–2002 ===
Logo used from 1997 to 2002

One of the original idents used by Channel 5 from 1997 to 2002

The original Channel 5 logo was a numeric "5" within a circle, sometimes accompanied by "candy stripes" of five colours (an idea based on the colour bars used by vision engineers to monitor picture output). Between 30 March 1997 and 15 September 2002, Channel 5 was the only UK terrestrial channel to display a digital on-screen graphic (DOG) in the top left-hand corner. On some programmes in the channel's early years, commercial breaks were introduced by an "end of part one" sign emerging horizontally from the DOG; when the programme returned after the break, this would become a "part two" sign, which then disappears back into the DOG.

On 14 April 1997, Teletext reported that 70% of viewers who took part in a poll were in favour of removing the DOG. Channel 5 refused to remove it, though they did state that since launch, the DOG had been toned down. Channel 5 explained their reasons for keeping the DOG on screen, in an interview on 30 March 1997, they explained that:

Five's candy stripes are intended to join the Nike tick, the Levi's tab and the three Adidas stripes as signifiers of belonging...

Brand identity is the new holy grail of marketing... Product recognition is the winning move in the new consumer system. Five is being sold like a car or a running shoe. Not surprisingly it will be the first of our terrestrial channels to wear its own label on the outside...

"Consumers are very brand-conscious these days..." "...and we are definitely describing ourselves as a very modern channel. It would be curious to launch an old-fashioned channel without an image in the era of Next, Levi's and Nike.

On 6 September 1999, Channel 5 launched its new 'celebrity' idents, making the candy stripe more frequently used in idents and graphics, most notably in a hole in the backdrop of the idents. The set of idents was refreshed on 11 September 2000 (although the 'celebrity' idents were later withdrawn in the summer of 2001), as well as new idents from 4 March 2002, featuring the logo on coloured backgrounds by going widescreen. These idents were used until a major rebrand on 16 September 2002.

=== 2002–2008 ===
Logo used from 2002 to 2008

In 2002, Channel 5 decided to drop the word 'Channel' from its name and refer to the channel as 'Five'. A new look was launched on 16 September 2002 featuring live-action footage with the new logo sliding in from the left of the screen. The new idents would sometimes be accompanied by pieces of chart music, such as Children by Robert Miles, and the rebrand would drop the "DOG" (or on-screen bug). The new look made frequent use of the Helvetica typeface. The informal name "Five" was used in early continuity announcements and idents containing a lowercase 'five' had been used on the channel from the launch.

The final set with this logo was launched on 23 January 2006, based on four-letter words such as Hope, Fast and Love. The idents at first did not feature the logo, but the idents were revised on 2 January 2007 to include the word Five again. Additional idents from late-2007 such as Bike, Beach, and Celebrity.

=== 2008–2011 ===
Logo used from 2008 to 2011

On 6 October 2008 at 9 pm, Five launched and aired a new look, replacing the lower-case "five" logo with an upper-case "FIVE" in a circle occasionally with pink, turquoise and purple light effects. The rebrand was conducted by DixonBaxi, and according to them, the new look was "more vocal, expressive and creative". The relaunch included a mix of live-action and CGI idents; some of these included supermarket trolleys used as an accordion, the Food Chain, Invisible Superheroes and Drawings.

The look was refreshed in July 2009, making the logo notably larger, and the circle becoming red. As part of the refresh, special idents were made for popular shows such as The Mentalist, Paul Merton in Europe, CSI: Crime Scene Investigation, The Gadget Show and FlashForward with the 2008 set being withdrawn except for the 'news safe' CGI idents. In February 2010, an additional ident was introduced, featuring a CGI aurora forming the logo tilted on its side. This was used at closedown and, sometimes, before news bulletins.

=== 2011–2016 ===
Logo used from 2011 to 2016

After the takeover by Richard Desmond's Northern & Shell, major changes and considerable financial investment were promised by the new owners, alongside a return to the 'Channel 5' moniker.

In October 2010, Desmond revealed the station's new look and confirmed its official on-screen identity as "Channel 5" during a press launch. Desmond promoted these changes in his tabloid newspapers, the Daily Express and Daily Star. There is also cross-promotion between Northern & Shell's newspaper and magazine titles with their websites promoted on the Channel 5 website. In 2010, afternoon movies on Channel 5 were sponsored by the Daily Express.

As for the logo, the red circle was retained, however, the word "FIVE" was replaced with the numeral "5". The extended version of the logo has the word "CHANNEL" in upper case font to its left. The DOG revived the "5" motif, originally as a transparent '5' cutout in a bright grey circle. From 18 February 2011, the DOG was modified to a white semi-transparent '5' on a faint grey circle. The DOG was later returned to the transparent '5' cutout in a bright grey circle. On 5 March 2013, the DOG was moved into the 16:9 safe area, along with the rest of their channels.

A range of new idents for Channel 5 was launched in February 2011 incorporating the "5" motif featuring live-action and CGI elements. They echo the predominantly red colour scheme of the channel's new corporate image, each based in a spacious studio with a large screen as the backdrop for the action. "Drums" features a drummer against a backdrop of animated shapes with the "5" appearing on a screen behind. In "Equaliser", a "5" contained in a cube emerges from a graphic equaliser display. "Imagination" features a battle between a toy dinosaur and a robot figure with the "5" logo imposed in neon lights (outlined). "VIP" features a model walking on a red carpet formed from the big screen with the logo formed out of the camera flashes. "Car Chase" features a police car chasing another car which eventually crashes 'through' the big screen with the logo being on the side of the police car. A generic ident with the Channel 5 logo pulsating on the studio screen was introduced in April 2012. Several special idents have also been used for The Hotel Inspector, The Walking Dead, Impossible?, Big Brother, The Bachelor, Europa League, The Mentalist, Tamara Ecclestone: Billion $$ Girl, It's All About Amy, How to Take Stunning Pictures, and The Gadget Show: World Tour also based around the same theme of the studio and screen. Programme preview cards feature the font "Gotham" in upper case. Break bumpers featured the "5" logo in the left-hand corner of the screen with a pattern of circles radiating out from the logo in an alternating red and black colour scheme.

This logo was retired from use on 10 February 2016; a virtually identical logo would later be used by American ABC affiliate WEWS-TV in Cleveland, Ohio beginning in September of that year, albeit in a blue colour.

=== 2016–2020 ===
Logo used from 2016 to 2025

On 11 February 2016, Channel 5 launched a new logo across all of its properties—a segmented 5 which can be rendered with various designs and animations, alongside a new series of "cinematic" idents, and break bumpers with text messages on them. The new branding was meant to signify a more upmarket and "creative" positioning for the broadcaster; vice-president of marketing Jo Bacon explained that "Our core proposition is Spirited TV, with emotional heart, reflecting the diverse, lively, colourful and creative content that has been the driving force behind our new strategic approach." Critics noted similarities between 5's new logo and that of competitor Channel 4. However, Bacon contrasted Channel 4, explaining that "our content allows millions of normal people access to diverse entertainment with no fuss. We are a playful challenger brand and can appeal to all audiences. The rebrand is a big opportunity to redefine the DNA of the Channel 5 brand and how it is perceived." 5Star and 5USA also adopted the new logo, while the catch-up service Demand 5 was renamed My5.

=== 2020–2025 ===
The idents were changed on 26 February 2020 with a new set focusing more on the logo on coloured backdrops pink, green, orange, blue, teal and black.

In August 2024, Channel 5's owner Paramount announced that it would be combining Channel 5 and My5 under a single brand to launch Q1 2025 simply known as "5". Therefore, these idents were retired on 12 March 2025, with the segmented '5' continuing on for the relaunch.

=== 2025–present ===
The 2020 ident concept was recycled with the new colours for a new generic ident in 2025, which debuted at 9.15am on 12 March 2025. Despite the change from Channel 5 to simply 5, sister channels 5Star, 5USA, 5Select and 5Action have remained the same.

== Audience share ==
Below are the official audience shares in per cent for Channel 5 since its launch in 1997. Data provided by BARB. The channel consistently is the fifth most watched channel in the country, usually being beaten by main rivals BBC One, BBC Two, ITV and Channel 4.

Audience share rose consistently for the first seven years of broadcast, reaching a peak of 6.6% in 2004. Two years later the audience share had dropped to under 5.0%. In 2012, the audience share rose to 4.5%, the first yearly rise for the channel in audience share since 2009. In July 2013, Channel 5 overtook Channel 4 when taking into account consolidated shares, for the first time. As of 2020 (the last full year published by BARB), the channel averages 4.1% of the total audience share.

| Year | Audience share |
|---|---|
| 1997 | 2.3% |
| 1998 | 4.3% |
| 1999 | 5.4% |
| 2000 | 5.7% |
| 2001 | 5.8% |
| 2002 | 6.3% |
| 2003 | 6.5% |
| 2004 | 6.6% |
| 2005 | 6.4% |
| 2006 | 4.9% |
| 2007 | 5.3% |
| 2008 | 4.6% |
| 2009 | 4.8% |
| 2010 | 4.5% |
| 2011 | 4.4% |
| 2012 | 4.5% |
| 2013 | 4.1% |
| 2014 | 4.4% |
| 2015 | 4.3% |
| 2016 | 4.1% |
| 2017 | 4.2% |
| 2018 | 4.0% |
| 2019 | 4.1% |
| 2020 | 4.1% |
| 2021 | 4.9% (Note: As of December 2021.) |
| 2022 | 4.1% (Note: As of June 2022.) |

== Programming ==
5, like all public service broadcasters, broadcasts a wide variety of programmes. The channel mainly broadcasts documentaries and drama with a few entertainment programmes, reality television and quiz shows in the schedule. In the early days, the channel was known for a high number of imported American dramas, including the broadcast rights to NCIS and CSI spin-offs, NCIS: New Orleans and CSI: Cyber, all of which Channel 5 had acquired by October 2014. By 2021, the rights to these shows had either expired or these titles were moved over to Channel 5's sister channels as the channel decided to focus its drama budget on its 'Original Dramas'.

The channel broadcasts some sports events not covered by other broadcasters but is notable for having been for several years the only terrestrial channel to show cricket, in the shape of highlights of England's summer test matches and one-day games. It also broadcasts its news service, which is currently produced by ITN but was produced between 2005 and 2012 by Sky News.

The channel frequently sticks to a regular schedule during the day, which during the 2010s included a phone-in chat show at 9:15 am (currently Jeremy Vine, which replaced The Wright Stuff in 2018), TV movies in the afternoon, after the Australian soap, Home and Away. 5 News programmes go out between 5 pm and 6 pm.

Flagship programmes for the channel include shows about farming, trains and royalty such as Our Yorkshire Farm, Springtime On The Farm and World's Most Scenic Railway Journeys. Saturday night royal documentaries have been a rating winner for Channel 5, with programmes about past members of the British Royal Family also getting good viewing figures, with a programme about King George V (whose reign was from 6 May 1910 until 20 January 1936) achieving a rating of 1.4 million viewers when it was first broadcast.

The channel has picked up some formats in the last 20 years that have been previously broadcast on other channels. These programmes have included titles such as Big Brother and Celebrity Big Brother (both ex-Channel 4, becoming shared between Channel 5 and MTV), Blind Date (ex-ITV) and the nightly quiz show Eggheads (previously broadcast on BBC Two). In the early 2000s it was also the home of Fifth Gear, a continuation of the original incarnation of the BBC show Top Gear with ex-presenters Quentin Willson, Tiff Needell, and Vicki Butler-Henderson, presenting the consumer advice series on Channel 5, whilst the BBC version of Top Gear became more of an entertainment car show.

Children's programming begins at 6 am every day with Milkshake! showing children's programmes include Thomas & Friends, Paw Patrol, Peppa Pig, Ben & Holly's Little Kingdom, Little Princess, Fifi and the Flowertots, Roary the Racing Car, Fireman Sam, Joshua Jones and many more.

In 2021, Channel 5 scheduled many music documentaries and countdowns on Friday nights, with shows such as Greatest Hits of the 80s, The Story of Songs and Britain's Biggest 90s Hits made by Viacom International Studios UK, the British production arm of owner ViacomCBS. After running music countdowns of the best selling songs 1970s, 80s and 90s, VIS started producing Britain's Favourite 80s Songs and Britain's Favourite 90s Songs in 2022, which dispensed with the countdown aspect of the show. However, Britain's Favourite 90s Songs was dropped from the primetime schedule after 1994, with 1995 being broadcast on its own and the final four episodes being broadcast around 3am in February 2024, with 1996 being added to the schedule at the last-minute in the place of a repeat of Bargain-Loving Brits in the Sun on 16 February 2024.

In September 2021, Ofcom approved the removal of Channel 5's 6.30 pm news slot for the channel to schedule Neighbours at 6 pm and Eggheads at 6.30 pm (with a new hour-long 5 News programme going out at 5 pm). These changes saw the early evening repeat of Home and Away moved to 5Star, with the Australian soap only broadcast on the main channel at lunchtime. The first-hour long-version of 5 News at 5 was broadcast by Channel 5 on 8 November 2021, with the programme still produced for the channel by ITN. 5 News at 5 is presented by Sian Williams and Claudia-Liza Vanderpuije, and has a live reporting team across the UK.

Also at the start of November 2021, P. D. James' adaptation of Dalgliesh debuted on the channel with four million viewers, while Our Yorkshire Farm achieved a rating of 3,260,437. On Saturday nights, the network's other new drama The Madame Blanc Mysteries was drawing in over two million viewers to the channel.

In February 2022, Channel 5 confirmed funding for Neighbours would be stopped with the production shutting down and the last episode aired 29 July 2022. As Paramount Global's 10 Peach scheduled the last episode for 7.30 pm on 28 July 2022 in Australia, Channel 5 brought back the broadcast of the final episode a few days to 29 July 2022, with The Finale becoming part of a Neighbours night alongside the Viacom UK programmes Neighbours Made Me a Star: From Ramsay St to Hollywood and Neighbours: All the Pop Hits & More, Especially For You. In addition, the 'Spirit of Queensland' episode of the channel's Bill Nighy narrated luxury train travel series was held back a week with the Al Andalus train journey from Seville taking its place on 22 July and the Brisbane to Cairns trip's title amended to Australia's Most Scenic Railway Journeys to fit in with the Neighbours theme night on 29 July 2022.

On 7 September 2022, a two-part day-by-day documentary with Xand van Tulleken and Raksha Dave called The Great Smog of 1952 started with the second episode scheduled for the following night. With the death of Queen Elizabeth II, the concluding part was dumped from the schedule after the channel went into a rolling royal documentary mode for the rest of the night. Their schedules for the following days were then amended to take out several thriller films, the over-night casino slots and documentaries which may have featured members of the Royal Family, like a forthcoming episode of The Cotswolds and Beyond with Pam Ayres, replacing these programmes with a range of their travel documentaries. The second part of The Great Smog of 1952 was rescheduled for 13 September 2022, with the documentary and a repeat of Paramount Pictures' award-winning romantic drama film, An Officer and a Gentleman, replacing a double bill of murder investigations. Dogs Behaving (Very) Badly, The Yorkshire Vet and the last episode of The Pyrenees with Michael Portillo were kept in the schedule as previously listed, going out in hourly slots between 7 pm and 10 pm.

Even though the channel is known for its royal documentaries, on the day of the funeral of Queen Elizabeth II Channel 5 decided to go with a counter-alternative schedule to all the royal coverage due to being shown on the BBC, ITV and Sky, with their regular Home and Away episode and Jeremy Vine dropped to make way for family-friendly productions like The Emoji Movie, The Adventures of Paddington and Stuart Little.

In November 2022, Channel 5 confirmed that one of their recent hits, Our Yorkshire Farm, would not be returning to the channel in its original form, with a three-part spin-off programme called Beyond The Yorkshire Farm: Reuben & Clive due to be launched on the channel on 6 December 2022. This series will show the father and son farming duo launching a digging business venture which sees them in the Cumbrian village of Langwathby digging out a series of ponds.

Even though the channel have commissioned Country & Coast series about Dorset, Norfolk & Suffolk, and Somerset, as well as a couple of series of Isle of Wight: Jewel of the South, the network has mostly become associated with programmes about Yorkshire. Francis Taylor in the Radio Times has commentated that the station gets a programming obsession with certain topics, though the channel has moved away from ordering so many programmes about Yorkshire and bulking the schedule out with programmes about scams and air fryers instead, with the channel going on to schedule nine documentaries about the kitchen appliance in 124 days.

In 2023, Paramount Global closed VIS UK, its non-scripted production division, which meant that travel shows featuring Susan Calman and Jane McDonald were moved over to Lionsgate's Daisybeck Studios, the company responsible for a number of rural programmes on Channel 5 like The Yorkshire Vet, The Highland Vet and all the farming shows filmed at Cannon Hall Farm.

After ordering 46 new episodes of Bargain Loving Brits in the Sun in 2022, the channel recommissioned the show in 2023 with an order totalling 136 episodes. Even though this order included 16 episodes to be broadcast in peak-time, only three episodes of series 11 were broadcast, including a tribute to the late Graham 'Happy Days' Boland. Instead of broadcasting the next episode in its 8pm Sunday night slot, the show was replaced in the schedule with a repeat of Greggs: What's Really in it? with Grace Dent. Also moved from primetime at the same time was The Pet Psychic: What's Your Dog Thinking? a 2022 series with Beth Lee Crowther which was new to the channel in 2024. The Pet Psychic was moved to a late night slot and replaced with another one of the channel's 'high street' programmes, Tesco: How Do They Really Do It?.

In 2024, it was reported that the channel was the only public service broadcaster to increase its total share of the UK viewing audience with its top rating shows of 2023 including The Inheritance (3.3 million viewers) Dogs Behaving (Very) Badly (1.9 million) and Police: Suspect No.1 (1.8 million). The channel's top rating drama on 2023 was All Creatures Great and Small, with its ratings of 3.7 million viewers getting the channel's biggest audience of the year, while 2 million people watched Captain Tom: Where Did the Money Go? making it Channel 5's highest rating single documentary ever.

The channel is known for reacting to trends which can result in a quick turn-around in programming. On 6 March 2024, after footage from Willy's Chocolate Experience in Glasgow went viral, it commissioned an hour-long documentary about the event, called Wonka: The Scandal that Rocked Britain, from Mentorn TV. It was broadcast by the channel ten days later, alongside a repeat of Inside Cadbury: The Real Chocolate Factory, with another showing of the 'Wonka' documentary being scheduled three days later on 19 March 2024.

== Most watched programmes ==
The following is a list of the twelve most watched broadcasts on Channel 5 up to 5 March 2021, based on Live +28 data supplied by BARB.

| Rank | Programme | UK viewers (millions) | Date |
|---|---|---|---|
| 1 | The Drowning | 6.10 | 1 February 2021 |
| 2 | Euro 2000 Qualifier: Poland v England | 5.63 | 8 September 1999 |
| 3 | World Cup Qualifier: Albania v England | 5.59 | 28 March 2001 |
| 4 | The Drowning | 5.57 | 2 February 2021 |
| 5 | All Creatures Great and Small | 5.49 | 1 September 2020 |
| 6 | Independence Day | 5.41 | 7 September 1999 |
| 7 | The Drowning | 5.32 | 4 February 2021 |
| 8 | Celebrity Big Brother | 5.27 | 18 August 2011 |
| 9 | All Creatures Great and Small | 5.22 | 15 September 2020 |
| 10 | All Creatures Great and Small | 5.17 | 6 October 2020 |
| 11 | The Drowning | 5.16 | 3 February 2021 |
| 12 | The X-Files | 5.10 | 8 February 2016 |

== 5 Text ==
From 1997 to 2011 Channel 5 operated its analogue teletext service providing a basic range of programme listings, film summaries and programme previews of Channel 5 content. The service was provided by Sky Text until 2002 when Teletext Ltd. took over as the provider of Channel 5's Teletext service. The service was withdrawn due to the digital switchover and the shift to the Internet and social media.

== Channel 5 on Pluto TV ==
As of December 2021, Channel 5 has several channels streaming 24 hours a day on Paramount Global's free TV app Pluto TV. The channels include:

- 5 Building Britain (with titles including Michael Buerk's documentary Building Victorian Britain: The Great Stink and George Clarke's Build a New House in the Country)
- 5 Cops (the UK version of Pluto's Spike TV's Cops 24/7 channel, featuring episodes from Police Interceptors)
- 5 Destination Britain (programmes include Walking Britain's Lost Railways with Rob Bell and Britain By Bike With Larry & George Lamb)
- 5 GPs (with back-to-back episodes of GPs: Behind Closed Doors)
- 5 Cruising with Jane McDonald (Back-to-back episodes of the Jane McDonald travel show, broadcast on the channel between 2017 and 2021)
- 5 Trucking Hell (repeats of Trucking Hell episodes)

== 5 on The Farm ==
5 on The Farm is Channel 5's festival which first took place at Cannon Hall Farm in Cawthorne, South Yorkshire on August Bank Holiday Weekend in 2021. The three-day event was based around Channel 5's ...on the Farm series (featuring series regulars Rob and Dave Nicholson, chef Tim Bilton as well as presenters Adam Henson, Helen Skelton, Jules Hudson and JB Gill) with appearances from people featuring in a range of Channel 5 programmes associated with farming, food and animals. These people included Peter Wright and Julian Norton from The Yorkshire Vet, Reuben and Amanda Owen from Our Yorkshire Farm, Ben Fogle from New Lives in the Wild, Graeme Hall from Dogs Behaving (Very) Badly and Stefan Gates from Secrets of Your Supermarket Food. The festival also has an area for children branded as the Milkshake! Meadow which (in 2021) featured presenters Derek Moran, Jen Pringle and Kemi Majeks alongside characters from Milkshake! including Peppa Pig, and Milkshake! Monkey and Fireman Sam.

== Criticism ==
In 2005, Channel 5 launched a mailing campaign to promote CSI:NY; these mailed promos suggested a murderer was on the loose, whose victims had the same name as the recipient. 197 people complained to the Advertising Standards Authority (ASA) that the campaign was distressing and not obviously a marketing tool. The ASA, which upheld the complaints, noted that it was the tenth most complained-about advertising campaign that year.

In a 2022 Radio Times interview with Mark Lawson, Channel 5's director of programmes Ben Frow gave answers to some of the regular criticisms viewers had over the past few years about scheduling. First, Channel 5 is known for giving programmes numerous titles, with the listing in the Radio Times not matching the EPG or the actual programme title. Second, a six-part series can be launched in a regular slot and then be dropped from the schedule after a few weeks (with the third series of Rob Bell's Building the Impossible dropped after one episode and replaced in its 9 pm slot by the repackaged The Dalgliesh Mysteries). Frow apologised to all the Radio Times readers who were annoyed by these regular occurrences but explained that when listings go to press he does not know what the competition from other channels might be and so may have to retitle a programme to make it stand out on the EPG or temporarily remove that show from the schedule until there is a better place for it. For example, the programme Billion Dollar Holiday City which turned up in the Channel 5 schedule on 17 July 2022, before new episodes of the holiday series Bargain-Loving Brits by the Sea and The Cruise was a revised and retitled version of late-night programme Secret World of Las Vegas: 24/7 which originally was broadcast by the channel in 2019, and put into production as Vegas 24:7 by Viacom Studios UK (now VIS UK).

On 22 June 2022, Paramount+ launched in the UK, with Channel 5 showing the first episode of the Paramount+ original series Halo on that night as a "taster". However, the marketing around this episode made it look like it was a new free-to-air series that was going to continue on the channel and Paramount+ every week, which resulted in the first of several feedback letters to the Radio Times about the practice of "taster TV". This time the viewer complained that this was just a "puff piece" to get people to subscribe to a paid service and thought the practice might be against the channel's PSB commitments, while in the magazine's 20–26 August 2022 issue, after one-off starter episodes of Halo, La Brea and The Box had been shown on the channel, a piece of viewer criticism headlined "Taster TV is no good to me" was highlighted as the magazine's Letter of the Week.

On 27 November 2023, Channel 5 pulled the docudrama 1928: The Year The Thames Flooded after historian Nikki Shaw was alleged to have Neo-Nazi links.

=== Queen Elizabeth II funeral controversy ===
On 19 September 2022, the funeral of Elizabeth II was occurring. BBC One, BBC Two, and ITV broadcast the funeral, while Channel 4 broadcast a documentary about Elizabeth II. However, Channel 5 played the 2017 film The Emoji Movie instead of the funeral. The move had mixed reactions. Some mocked the channel and insulted it for disrespecting a recently dead member of the Royal Family. Other people online praised the channel for airing child-friendly alternatives during a dark day in the nation. Other children's programming was aired on the channel, including the 1999 film Stuart Little.

== See also ==
- Channel 5 Broadcasting Limited
