= 5USA =

British free-to-air television channel

- Logo used since 2016
- Country: United Kingdom

Programming
- Language: English
- Picture format: 1080p HDTV (Sky Glass only); 576i SDTV
- Timeshift service: 5USA +1

Ownership
- Owner: Paramount Networks UK & Australia
- Parent: Channel 5 Broadcasting Limited
- Sister channels: 5; 5Star; 5Drama; 5Action

History
- Launched: 16 October 2006; 20 years ago
- Former names: Five US (2006–09); Five USA (2009–11)

Links
- Website: 5USA

Availability

Terrestrial
- Freeview: Channel 21

Streaming media
- FilmOn: Watch live
- Sky Go: Watch live
- Virgin TV Go: Watch live (UK only); Watch live (+1) (UK only)

5USA is a British free-to-air television channel owned by Channel 5 Broadcasting Limited, a wholly owned subsidiary of Paramount Skydance Corporation, which is grouped under Paramount Networks UK & Australia division. It was launched on 16 October 2006 as Five US and was the second digital terrestrial television channel in the UK to be launched by RTL Group (the owner at the time) as part of their multi-channel strategy, the first being Five Life (now 5Star). 5USA concentrates on showing imported movies and programmes from the United States.

== History ==
The channel's original broadcast hours were from 4:00 pm to 1:00 am, however it extended its hours starting at 12:00 pm in June 2007. On 1 November 2015, the channel began broadcasting from 7:00 am until 3:00 am. The channel changes its programme slots and shows from time to time.

British comedian Russell Kane was the 'face of the channel', presenting short clips between some programmes which acted as space fillers to comply with advertising regulations in the UK (UK regulations allows fewer minutes of advertising than in the US) until 16 February 2009. The music used during the pre-February 2009 idents was performed by Sufjan Stevens, and are four of Sufjan's songs: "The Dress Looks Nice on You", "Chicago", "Jacksonville" and "The Man of Metropolis Steals Our Hearts".

On 28 August 2007, Five US launched a timeshift channel – Five US +1 – available only on Sky. On 22 January 2009, it was announced that Five US would be rebranded Five USA on 16 February. It became 5USA in March 2011 as part of a corporate rebranding.

== Ratings ==
The channel's highest ratings to date were on 12 February 2008 for the second part of the CSI: Crime Scene Investigation and Without a Trace crossover. The show averaged 2.58 million viewers between 10:00 and 11:00 pm, equating to a multichannel share of 13.9%. Those numbers made the show the most-watched multichannel programme in its slot – beating every other channel (digital and analogue) aside from BBC One, and is currently one of the highest ratings for a multichannel in the United Kingdom.

== Former logos ==
Five USA logo
(16 February 2009 – 14 February 2011)

5USA logo
(14 February 2011 – 11 February 2016)
