= Viva (British and Irish TV channel) =

British music television channel (2009–2018)

VIVA
- Viva in the UK and Ireland used a different logo compared to other Viva channels.
- Country: United Kingdom and Ireland
- Broadcast area: United Kingdom and Ireland

Programming
- Language: English

Ownership
- Owner: Viacom International Media Networks Europe
- Sister channels: List: MTV; MTV Base; MTV Classic; MTV Dance; MTV Hits; MTV Live; MTV Music; MTV Rocks; VH1; BET; Channel 5; 5Star; 5USA; 5Spike; My5; Comedy Central; Comedy Central Extra; Nickelodeon; Nick Jr.; Nick Jr. Too; Nicktoons

History
- Launched: October 26, 2009; 16 years ago
- Replaced: TMF
- Closed: January 31, 2018; 8 years ago
- Replaced by: MTV OMG

Links
- Website: uk.viva.tv

Availability (at time of closure)

Terrestrial
- Freeview HD: Channel 57

Streaming media
- Online: (UK only)

Viva (stylised as VIVA) was a British free-to-air music and entertainment television channel owned by Viacom International Media Networks Europe. The channel launched on 26 October 2009, replacing TMF, and closed on 31 January 2018.

== History ==
The channel was officially launched on 26 October 2009 by Alexandra Burke, with an exclusive live performance of her single "Bad Boys". The first music video to be shown on Viva was Alphabeat's "The Spell" in The Official UK Chart Show Top 20 hosted by Sarah-Jane Crawford. It originally broadcast for 24 hours a day until Noggin was removed from the schedule and its hours were reduced to 6:00am – 9:00am, with paid programmes filling these hours. It was further reduced to 3:00am – 9:00am on 1 August 2011.

On 19 September 2011, the channel started broadcasting in the 16:9 picture format but the digital on-screen graphic was still set to the 4:3 picture format and appeared stretched; this was later fixed so it appears within the 4:3 safe zone. As with other Viacom channels, most 4:3 content were stretched to 14:9.

Viva removed its free-to-view encryption on satellite on 19 March 2013, before launching on the free-to-air platform, Freesat, on 2 April 2013.

On 8 October 2014, following Viacom's acquisition of UK broadcaster Channel 5, it was announced that Viva would be removed from Freeview with all of its entertainment content moving to 5*. Its EPG slot was replaced by 5USA (which had moved from Freeview channel 31 for the launch of Spike) on 15 April 2015, with Viva moving to Freeview channel 74 and its broadcast hours changed to 9:00 to 11:00. The channel continued broadcasting full-time on all other platforms.

On 31 July 2015, Viva moved to Freeview channel 58, and was only available to viewers who had devices which are compatible with Freeview HD, Freeview Play, YouView or EE TV in certain areas of the UK. It broadcast from 9:00 until 11:00. It moved once again on Freeview on 2 October 2015 from Channel 58 to 57. Following the establishment of a stream sharing capacity with 5USA +1, Viva extended to broadcast between 5:00am and 6:00pm on digital terrestrial television.

=== Closure ===
Viva closed at 6:00 am on 31 January 2018, with the final music video shown was Spice Girls' "Viva Forever". A day before, it was removed from Freesat, and the network's website was redirected to the MTV charts webpage. From 1 February, DTT's channel 57 began carrying a part-time placeholder broadcast of 5Spike +1. The 5:00 am – 6:00 pm hours previously used by Viva would be used to extend 5USA +1 into daytime. Throughout February 2018, the temporary Valentine's Day–focused MTV Love network replaced it on Sky and Virgin Media, before being replaced by MTV OMG on 1 March 2018, which would also close in July 2020.

== Former programming ==
Along with music videos, Viva aired programmes from other Viacom channels including MTV, Nickelodeon, Comedy Central and Channel 5.

- 16 and Pregnant
- America's Best Dance Crew
- Are You the One? (2014–2015)
- Beavis and Butt-Head (2013–2014)
- Bellator MMA
- Blonde Charity Mafia
- Brickleberry
- Bromance
- Brooke Knows Best
- Catfish: The TV Show (2013–2015)
- Celebrity Deathmatch
- The City (2009–2012)
- Community (season 1)
- Crash Canyon
- Daddy's Girls
- Daria
- Dirty Sanchez (2009–2015)
- The Dudesons in America (2011)
- Fly Girls (2009–2010)
- The Fresh Prince of Bel-Air (2011–2014)
- The Hard Times of RJ Berger
- The Hills (2009–2012)
- Hogan Knows Best
- Hulk Hogan's Celebrity Championship Wrestling
- Jackass (2009–2015)
- Jersey Shore (2011–2012)
- Kung Fu Panda: Legends of Awesomeness (2013–2015)
- Laguna Beach: The Real Orange County
- MTV Cribs
- My Super Sweet 16
- My Wife and Kids
- New York Goes to Hollywood
- The Official UK Chart Show
- The Osbournes
- Pants-Off Dance-Off
- The Penguins of Madagascar (2013–2015)
- Pretty Little Liars (2010–2013)
- Punk'd
- The Real World
- Run's House
- Scarred
- Scream Queens
- Scrubs (2013–2015)
- A Shot at Love with Tila Tequila
- Slips
- South Park (2009–2013)
- SpongeBob SquarePants (2012–2015)
- Suck My Pop
- Teen Cribs
- Teen Mom
- Teen Mom 2
- Teen Mom 3
- That '70s Show
- True Beauty (2010–2011)
- Two and a Half Men (2009–2012)
- Two Pints of Lager and a Packet of Crisps (2013–2015)
- Viva La Bam
- Whitney

== Presenters ==
- Sarah-Jane Crawford
- Kimberley Walsh

== Noggin ==
Noggin was an early morning children's television block from Nick Jr., that was broadcast on Viva from 06:00–09:00 daily. The programming block was first shown on TMF and initially continued on Viva, before being discontinued in March 2010. The schedule in October 2009 included:

- The Backyardigans
- Dora the Explorer
- Go, Diego, Go!
- LazyTown
- Little Bear
- Maggie and the Ferocious Beast
- Thomas & Friends
- Wonder Pets!
- Yo Gabba Gabba!

== See also ==
- VIVA Media
- VIVA Germany
- MTV UK
- MTV Rocks
- MTV Base
- MTV Dance
- MTV Hits
