= TMF (UK & Ireland) =

Defunct British music video and entertainment channel

- Country: United Kingdom
- Broadcast area: United Kingdom, Ireland

Programming
- Picture format: 4:3, 576i (SDTV)

Ownership
- Owner: Viacom International Media Networks
- Sister channels: MTV; MTV Two; MTV Base; MTV Dance; VH1; VH1 Classic

History
- Launched: 31 October 2002
- Closed: 26 October 2009
- Replaced by: Viva

Links
- Website: mtv.co.uk/tmf

Availability

Terrestrial
- Freeview: Channel 21

TMF (The Music Factory) is a defunct music video and entertainment television channel in the United Kingdom and Ireland owned by Viacom International Media Networks. Originally a Dutch channel, it was formed after the two other TMF channels, which were based in mainland Europe, the channel was created to counter against EMAP's The Hits channel (later 4Music) on the free-to-air digital terrestrial television service Freeview in 2002, it was closed and replaced by Viva on 26 October 2009.

Upon launch, TMF's description was "TMF is designed to replicate the rhythms of the whole family, playing the best pop videos with the biggest pop stars to become the sound track to the British family life." However, it later broadened its content to air non-music video programming from its sister channels MTV, VH1, Nick Jr., Nickelodeon, and Comedy Central.

TMF broadcast on Freeview, Sky and Virgin Media and as well as in some Irish cable packages. The channel was the most watched music video related channel in the UK, according to BARB ratings.

== Programming ==
=== MTV/VH1 programming ===
TMF launched as a non-stop music channel. However in early 2004 it began to air reality programming which was also shown on MTV and VH1:

- Beavis and Butt-Head
- Date My Mom
- Dirty Sanchez
- Drawn Together
- The Fabulous Life of...
- Hogan Knows Best
- Jackass
- Made
- MTV Cribs
- My Fair Brady
- My Super Sweet 16
- Pimp My Ride
- Room Raiders
- The Surreal Life

=== Noggin ===
Noggin launched in the UK on 30 January 2006, as the first international feed of Noggin (excluding a block on Nick Jr. which aired older British children's programmes and only had the name in common). It was a children's television block broadcast on TMF from 07:00 to 09:00 daily. It showed a selection of Nick Jr. shows and often promoted the full Nick Jr. channels to viewers with only Freeview. It was hosted by Moose A. Moose and Zee D. Bird from the American Noggin.

It was replaced by Nick Jr. on TMF in September 2006, before being relaunched in 2009. The final set of programmes shown were Go, Diego, Go!, Dora the Explorer, Little Bear, Bruno and Maggie and the Ferocious Beast.

Noggin was the first commercial children's television channel launched on 30 January 2006 on TMF to air on the UK's DTT platform, Freeview, followed by CITV, then Playhouse Disney on ABC1.

Following the closure of TMF, the block continued on Viva until March 2010, when the Nick Jr. rebrand caused Noggin to shutdown. However, the branding of Noggin and the Moose and Zee segments were adopted by Nick Jr. and used until January 2013.

=== Nick Jr on TMF ===
Nick Jr on TMF replaced Noggin as a block on 25 September 2006, but its programming remained identical. It used the same ident and presentation package as its main sister channel, Nick Jr. Moose and Zee's segments were removed as well. Programmes shown included Peppa Pig, Maggie and the Ferocious Beast, Dora the Explorer, The Backyardigans, Thomas & Friends, Blue's Clues, LazyTown, Go Diego Go!, and Little Bill. It would be replaced and reverted to Noggin in early 2009.

=== Nickelodeon programming ===
Reairings of Nickelodeon UK Kids' Choice Awards 2008 were scheduled on TMF and MTV Hits in September 2008.

TMF also aired SpongeBob SquarePants for a brief time in 2004, in late night hours.

=== Comedy Central programming ===
In January 2007, TMF began showing comedies broadcast on Paramount Comedy, in a strand entitled Comedy Classics. These included The Wonder Years, Ally McBeal and Cheers, as well as various Paramount films. During The Friday Movie strand, the channel's digital on-screen graphic changed to an enlarged version, with a re-arranged name displaying "TFM".

=== Original programming ===
In August 2005, TMF commissioned two shows called Pop the Q and Game One. In early 2006, TMF premiered The Loaded Hour (a male-orientated themed show named after the magazine sponsor, hosted by Kate Edmondson), and in the summer a new live show called TMF Live (presented again by Edmondson, as well as TMF News anchor Carole Machin). With the exception of Pop the Q, none of the shows had a second series.

== Replacement and closure ==
On 14 October 2009, MTV Networks announced plans to replace TMF with a new music and comedy channel. Viva replaced TMF on 26 October 2009. The final music video that was shown on TMF was Whitney Houston's "Million Dollar Bill" at around 5:55 am on 26 October 2009. After this, the channel showed its Noggin children's strand, which continued on Viva until March 2010. It then showed a promo consisting of music videos at 9 am. The last video played on the promo programme Up Your Video (Note: Viva officially launched at 4pm, therefore Up Your Video was shown on TMF.) was Cheryl Cole's "Fight For This Love" at 3:55 pm on 26 October 2009.

== See also ==
- Viva
- MTV
- MTV Rocks
- MTV Base
- MTV Dance
- MTV Hits
