= Comedy Central (UK & Ireland) =

British pay television channel

- Logo used since 2019
- Country: United Kingdom
- Broadcast area: United Kingdom; Ireland
- Network: Comedy Central

Programming
- Language: English
- Picture format: 1080p HDTV
- Timeshift service: Comedy Central +1

Ownership
- Owner: Paramount UK Partnership (Skydance UK/Sky Group)
- Sister channels: Comedy Central Extra

History
- Launched: 1 November 1995
- Former names: The Paramount Channel (1995–1997); Paramount Comedy Channel (1997–2002); Paramount Comedy (2002–2005); Paramount Comedy 1 (2005–2009)

Links
- Website: Official website; Official Ireland website

Comedy Central is a pay television channel in the United Kingdom and Ireland that features original and syndicated comedy programming. The local variant of the Comedy Central channel in the United States, it launched as The Paramount Channel in 1995, later rebranding as the Paramount Comedy Channel in 1997, Paramount Comedy in 2002 and Paramount Comedy 1 in 2005 before adopting its current name on 6 April 2009.

== History ==
The channel was launched as The Paramount Channel on 1 November 1995. The original schedule was a mixture of comedy and drama, including such eclectic offerings as Beauty and the Beast, several Japanese anime productions acquired from Manga Entertainment, and authentic Paramount archive programming such as The Magician, as well as Nickelodeon's Ren & Stimpy, which was shown on Paramount rather than Nickelodeon due to its rather adult nature at times. It originally aired every evening after Nickelodeon's closing at 7:00 pm until around 4:00 am, with a testcard featuring a chicken crossing the road and holding up traffic airing during downtime (a segment deemed as "Chicken Tonite") until Nickelodeon started up at 6:00 am.

Logo used from September 2005 until 6 April 2009.

In February 1997, it was announced that the network would undergo a reformatting as the Paramount Comedy Channel, dedicated solely to comedy shows.

The channel was added to Sky Digital upon its launch in 1998.

In June 2000, it was announced that the channel would begin broadcast full time by the following year. On 17 December, it was officially announced that the channel would no longer timeshare with Nickelodeon and expand its broadcast hours to start at 9:00 am from 4 February 2001, with the addition of a daytime schedule.

On 1 January 2001, the channel was added to ONDigital.

On 1 May 2002, the channel began daytime operations on Telewest Active Digital.

On 30 August 2005, a one-hour timeshift service, Paramount Comedy +1, launched on Sky Digital.

Logo used from 6 April 2009 until 31 July 2012; the channel adopted the same on-screen identity as its American counterpart the next day on 1 August.

On 17 February 2009, it was confirmed that Paramount Comedy 1 would become Comedy Central from 6 April 2009 in the UK and Ireland. Since season 13, Comedy Central has aired new episodes of South Park two days after they aired in the US (i.e., the episodes air on Comedy Central US on Wednesdays, and air on the UK counterpart on Fridays.) At 9:00pm on 6 April, Paramount Comedy 1 was finally relaunched as Comedy Central, with the last programme on PC1 being an episode of Scrubs and the first programme on Comedy Central being a new episode of Two and a Half Men. Comedy Central idents from this era were filmed in locations such as The Gherkin, Forth Bridge and Nelson's Column.

A high-definition simulcast, Comedy Central HD, launched on Sky on 9 August 2010 and Virgin Media on 1 September 2010.

Logo used from 1 August 2012 until 9 January 2019.

== Subsidiary channels ==
A second timeshift, Paramount Comedy 2 +1 (now Comedy Central Extra +1) was launched on Sky channel 159, on 5 November 2007. Nicktoons Replay did timeshare with the channel between 6:00am and 7:00pm. However, that channel closed on 2 October 2012 and was replaced with a one-hour timeshift version of Nick Jr., allowing Comedy Central Extra +1 to broadcast 24 hours a day. Comedy Central Extra +1 closed on 20 July 2020 along with the timeshifts for MTV and MTV Music, as well as MTV OMG, Club MTV and MTV Rocks.

== Availability in Ireland ==
Comedy Central has an alternative Irish feed of the same channel available on Sky Ireland, Virgin Media Ireland, Vodafone TV, and Eir. The feed launched in May 2006, advertising on this channel is overseen by Sky Media Ireland. The domain name comedycentral.ie also redirects to comedycentral.co.uk. An additional Irish commercial feed of the time-shift service, Comedy Central +1, was also launched shortly after the parent channel's re-branding on 6 April 2009. On 31 July 2019, Comedy Central Ireland +1 ceased broadcasting.

From 31 March 2019, Comedy Central and Comedy Central Extra's Irish broadcasting licence is registered within the Czech Republic.

== Programming ==
=== Original programming ===
In October 2011, Threesome, a narrative comedy series and Comedy Central's first original scripted comedy began. The series starred Emun Elliott, Irish actor Amy Huberman and Stephen Wight, was written by Tom MacRae, and produced by Big Talk Productions.

In May 2012, it was announced that Comedy Central was to make a major push into original comedy content, with more than 20 new projects at various stages of development, and 10 scripts already ordered. Programming executive Sarah Farrell told trade magazine Broadcast, "This time next year, we will be doing as many of those projects as we possibly can. We are looking for things that are big, broad and accessible, with the laugh-out-loud factor that comes from big jokes and set pieces." She also noted that they are now "fully committed to the plans."

The process was being micro-managed by Paramount bosses in New York, but with the announcement of such projects and Threesome's success, UK executives have been given greater control. Farrell also indicated that if the already commissioned second series of Threesome is popular, then "a third run could be up to 22 episodes in length."

As of May 2012, details about most of the new projects are not publicly available, though the magazine Broadcast reported minor details of a proposed single-camera sitcom about a graduate who moves back in with his parents. A pilot episode of Big Bad World, which is written by Joe Tucker and Lloyd Woolf is reportedly being produced by Objective Productions and by the team behind Peep Show. Tristram Shapeero, who had been working in the US and whose credits include Happy Endings, Green Wing, Community, and I'm Alan Partridge, will direct, with Andrew Newman and Ben Farrell executive producing. Five further scripts are already complete, should the pilot be seen in a positive light by Comedy Central bosses.

Comedy Central's move into original productions did not come without problems, as it was announced in April 2012 that Pete Thornton, the channel's comedy commissioner, had resigned to return to the BBC comedy department as its Creative Head of Comedy, and would oversee Comic Relief 2013. Comedy Central is one of several UK digital channels to work on increasing their original comedy output, with BSkyB investing in new British comedy programmes, and UKTV channels Dave and Gold also producing more of their own content.

Alongside the other VIMN (Viacom International Media Networks) networks in the UK, Comedy Central, fueled by the purchase of Channel 5, there has been an announcement to open a production studio to make programming for Comedy Central and other channels.

It was announced in 2016 that Comedy Central and Channel X had greenlit a new prank comedy reality show presented and starting YouTuber Ben Phillips and his friends. The new series, titled Ben Phillips Blows Up, the channel announced there would be a 22-minute pilot episode due to be released in 2017 on Comedy Central. A full series would happen if the show is well received.

In 2021, Comedy Central UK ordered three new shows for the network including quiz show Fact Off and panel show The Complaints Department. The third new show was an all female comedy panel/satire show called Yesterday, Today and The Day Before which was due to be hosted each week by comedians Suzi Ruffell, Maisie Adam and Sophie Duker, until Duker quit after the first episode in protest over cuts to her monologue about conflict between Israel and Palestine. These shows join other unscripted/panel show formats on the network including Rhod Gilbert's Growing Pains, Comedy Game Night (previously shown on Channel 5) and Guessable?, hosted by Sara Pascoe.

On 29 September 2021, Fact Off debuted on the channel at 9pm, under the new name of Rob Beckett's Undeniable, with Joe Swash, Kae Kurd, Angela Barnes and Ivo Graham, the first guests of the new series.

== Marathons ==
The channel frequently airs weekend marathons which consist of one or two shows being on-air for the majority of the day. They often contain loose themes and are on occasion sponsored, such as the "He Ain't Funny, He's My Brother" marathon which ran on the night of 24 November 2007. This night consisted of episodes from shows with a strong brother relationship theme and was sponsored by the film The Darjeeling Limited to promote its nationwide release.

== Movies ==
Comedy Central also broadcasts comedy, animation or action films, including South Park: Bigger, Longer & Uncut, Dumb and Dumber, Jerry Maguire, The Mask, White Chicks, Scary Movie 3, Teen Wolf, 13 Going on 30, Bad Boys, Bad Boys 2, Police Academy: Mission to Moscow, Austin Powers: The Spy Who Shagged Me, and Happy Feet.

The channel has begun showing movies on a regular basis, typically from 10:00 pm onwards.

In 2016, Comedy Central introduced a new service called Thursday Night Movies, in which a movie is broadcast on Comedy Central every Thursday, usually at about 9:00pm.

== Picture format ==
Until late 2011, Comedy Central and Comedy Central Extra continued to air in 4:3 in standard-definition, although many shows had already converted to 16:9 widescreen format, they were cropped to remain in a full-frame screen and later some were letterboxed. The shows on Comedy Central HD air in 16:9, though those in 4:3 are pillarboxed to fit the frame of widescreen. This practice was extended to the standard-definition channels when they began broadcasting in widescreen.

== See also ==
- Comedy Central Extra, sister channel
- List of programmes broadcast by Comedy Central (UK & Ireland)
