= MTV (UK & Ireland) =

MTV channel in the UK and Ireland

- Logo used since 2021
- Country: United Kingdom
- Broadcast area: United Kingdom; Ireland
- Headquarters: London, England, United Kingdom

Programming
- Language: English
- Picture format: 1080i HDTV (downscaled to 16:9 576i for the SDTV feed)
- Timeshift service: MTV +1 (2008–2020); MTV One +2 (2008)

Ownership
- Owner: Paramount Networks UK & Australia
- Sister channels: Channel 5; 5Star; 5Select; 5Action

History
- Launched: 1 July 1997; 29 years ago
- Former names: MTV UK & Ireland (1997–2004); MTV UK (2004–2007); MTV One (2007–2009)

Links
- Website: mtv.co.uk mtv.ie

Availability

Streaming media
- Sky Go: Watch live (UK & Ireland only)
- Now: Watch live (UK and Ireland only)
- Virgin TV Anywhere: Watch live (UK only)

MTV is a British and Irish pay television channel focusing on reality TV operated by Paramount Networks UK & Australia.

The channel launched as part of MTV Networks Europe localisation strategy in 1997. MTV UK (previously MTV UK & Ireland; MTV One) was launched on 1 July 1997. The channel was set up to provide audiences with local artists and more relevant music content. Prior to the localisation of MTV in Europe, the region was served by MTV Europe which was launched on 1 August 1987. Since February 2011 MTV has been solely an entertainment channel.

The channel is currently available in over 10 million homes in the UK and Ireland.

== Availability ==
From its inception, MTV UK (then branded as MTV UK & Ireland) the network served United Kingdom and Ireland. For a short period the channel was made available free-to-air in New Zealand between July 1997 to June 1998 under a special agreement between TVNZ and MTV Networks Europe. The channel was broadcast on analogue from the Astra 1A satellite as part of the Sky Multichannels subscription package. In April 2001, the channel became a digital-only channel within the UK and Ireland.

== History ==
=== 1987–2001 ===
MTV first became available in the UK when MTV Europe launched on 1 August 1987. On 1 July 1997, at 06:00 Western European time, MTV UK began broadcasting in the UK and Ireland as part of MTV Networks Europe's regionalisation strategy. The first video clip shown on the air was "Three Lions" by The Lightning Seeds. MTV UK & Ireland launched with specialised content of hit MTV Europe shows which included the Euro Top 20, MTV Select, MTV News, MTV News Weekend Edition, Non-Stop Hits, US Top 20 Hitlist UK, Stylissimo, The Big Picture, Up 4 It and The Lick. The channel promoted mainly English-speaking music programming and music.

MTV Europe became encrypted on Astra on 1 July 1995.

In 1999, MTV Networks Europe announced that it would expand its channel portfolio within the UK and Ireland. On 1 July 1999, MTV launched MTV Base and MTV Extra. MTV UK & Ireland also rebranded with a new schedule and on-air presentation.

=== 2002–2010 ===
In 2002, MTV began to air programming from MTV US, similar to other MTV channels in Europe. MTV began to drop some of its localised programming in favour of MTV US shows. These shows included Jackass, Date My Mom and Dismissed. Despite targeted efforts to play certain types of music videos in limited rotation, MTV greatly reduced its overall rotation of music videos throughout the first decade of the 2000s. While music videos dominated the channel in early 2000-2002 the rate of music rotation declined rapidly. Similar trends are noted on other European MTV channels and other sister networks in the US.

On 6 September 2006, MTV Flux launched in the UK and Ireland. MTV Flux was an attempt at marrying a video music channel with interactive online features. It had both a social media component, where users could set up their own, individual profiles as well as access to submit video clips through the MTV Flux website. MTV Flux was shuttered in January 2008.

On 22 July 2007, MTV in the UK was renamed 'MTV One' with a major new branding launching across most of the MTV channels. MTV2 was renamed 'MTV Two' to follow the consistent branding across the channels. Promotion started on 1 July 2007 under the title 'MTV New 22.07.07'. The rebrand saw viewers engaging with the channel. In early 2009, it was announced that MTV One would be rebranded as simply MTV and the one-hour timeshift MTV One +1 as MTV +1 on 1 July 2009.

For most of 2008, MTV's main source of music video programming was based on its sister channels MTV Two, MTV Hits, MTV Dance, MTV Base and TMF. As of 2009 the only music based programming on MTV include MTV Push, MTV World Stage and MTV Iggy. These shows are produced by MTV Networks International and are shown on most MTV channels worldwide.

On 1 July 2009 MTV available in the UK and Ireland adopted MTV's global identity as part of MTV International. 64 MTV channels now share similar music and entertainment content and similar on-air and online branding. Part of the rebrand saw a 50/50 balance in the number of music based programming and reality based TV series that air on the channels.

From 2010, MTV increased its music output which has since been diluted by reality based television programmes. As part of a global strategy MTV music content with the launch of MTV World Stage and Friday Night Music, both shows helped to maintain MTV's audience figures.

=== 2011–2024 ===
On 1 February 2011, MTV removed all music from the channel and moved it to newly launched channel MTV Music; the only music that remains is the occasional MTV Most Wanted strand. The channel became a general entertainment channel and was moved to the entertainment section of Sky's EPG at channel 126, with MTV +1 moving to 160. The move resulted in an increase in the channel's audience share of nearly 150% in the 6 weeks after the change, while viewing was down nearly 20% on Virgin Media during the same period, where the channel had yet to move. On 29 May 2013 MTV was moved to the entertainment section of Virgin Media's EPG on channel 134.

MTV was rebranded once again to the current logo on 1 July 2011, and began broadcasting in 16:9 widescreen at the same time. A high-definition simulcast of MTV launched on 13 February 2012 on Sky in the UK and Ireland.

In 2016, MTV started showing repeats of Big Brother UK in the UK, the day following its broadcast on Channel 5.

=== 2025 ===
Amid a global reorganisation of MTV, Paramount Global announced on Friday, 27 June 2025 that MTV UK has cancelled its local programmes, including Fresh Out Live and MTV Gonzo, fronted by Becca Dudley and Jack Saunders respectively. UK-focused content will instead appear on MTV's social-media channels, while the broadcast feed pivots to mainly international output. Most of the redundancies at MTV's London office affect on-air talent and production staff.

These cuts would continue in October 2025, when it was announced that all of MTV's music-centric sister channels would close at the end of the year. This comes after the company's decision to cut $500 million of their global portfolio, and coincides with closures of other Paramount channels in select other European countries and Brazil.

At 23:34 on 31 December 2025, MTV UK aired its final music video, Adele's 'Hello'. From 1 January 2026 onwards, MTV HD will concentrate exclusively on reality television and films.

== Former presenters ==
- (United Kingdom) Alex Zane
- (United Kingdom) Alice Levine
- (United Kingdom) Anthony Crank
- (United Kingdom) Becca Dudley (2012–2025)
- (United Kingdom) Bluey Robinson (2012–2016)
- (United Kingdom) Cat Deeley
- (Republic of Ireland) Danann Breathnach
- (United Kingdom) Dane Bowers
- (United Kingdom) Dave Berry
- (United Kingdom) Donna Air
- (Republic of Ireland) DP Fitzgerald
- (United Kingdom) Eddy Temple-Morris
- (United Kingdom) Edith Bowman
- (United Kingdom) Emma Willis
- (Republic of Ireland) Emma Ledden
- (United Kingdom) Greg James
- (United Kingdom) Jack Saunders
- (United Kingdom) Joel Dommett
- (United Kingdom) June Sarpong
- (United Kingdom) Justin Lee Collins
- (United Kingdom) Kelly Brook
- (United Kingdom) Lilah Parsons
- (United Kingdom) Lisa Snowdon
- (Republic of Ireland) Laura Whitmore (2008–2016)
- (United Kingdom) Melvin O'Doom
- (United Kingdom) Michael Gibson
- (Netherlands) Simone Angel
- (United Kingdom) Richard Blackwood
- (United Kingdom) Rickie Haywood Williams
- (United Kingdom) Russell Brand
- (United Kingdom) Sara Cox
- (United Kingdom) Sarah Cawood
- (United Kingdom) Tim Kash
- (United Kingdom) Trevor Nelson
- (New Zealand) Zane Lowe

== Programming ==
=== Former UK produced shows ===
- MTV News (1997–2019)
- Geordie Shore (2011–present)
- Ex on the Beach (2014–present)
- Teen Mom UK (2016–present)
- Just Tattoo of Us (2017–2020)
- The Charlotte Show (2018–2019)
- True Love or True Lies (2018–2019)
- MTV Top 40 (2019)
- MTV Cribs UK (2019)
- Celebrity Ex on the Beach (2020–present)
- Celebs on the Farm (2021) (moved from Channel 5)
- Booba (2014–2020) (moved from Nickelodeon)

=== Former Pan-European shows ===
- Crispy News (2009–2010)
- Euro Top 20 (1990–2009)
- MTV at the Movies
- MTV Iggy (2008–2009)
- MTV Movies
- MTV Push (2009–present)
- MTV World Stage (2009–present)
- My Super Sweet 16
- Pimp My Ride
- Plain Jane
- Teen Dad

=== Former MTV UK & Ireland shows ===
- 1 Leicester Square (2006)
- 3XLive (1999)
- Beauty School Cop Outs (2013)
- Brand: New (1999–2002)
- Breaking Point (2004)
- Daily Chart Show Live (2001)
- Dirty Sanchez (2003–2007)
- Fur TV (2008)
- FYI (2007)
- Hitlist International (2004)
- Hitlist UK (1992–2002)
- Hitlist US (2004)
- Irish Top 5 (2004)
- Kerry Katona: Crazy in Love (2007–2008)
- The Lick with Trevor Nelson
- Living on the Edge (2007–2008)
- Mad 4 Hits (1998–2001)
- Mighty Moshin' Emo Rangers (2007–2008)
- Million Dollar Baby (2018)
- MTV Amour (1996–1998)
- MTV Bang (2010–2011)
- MTV Biggest Hits
- MTV Blaggers (2004)
- MTV Bytesize (1999–2002)
- MTV Dance Mix
- MTV Digs (2009–2011)
- MTV Hot (1997–1998)
- MTV News Cube (2008)
- MTV News Daily Edition (1999–2001)
- MTV News Weekend Edition (1997–2002)
- MTV Txt Request (2001–2002)
- Non-Stop Hits (1997–1999)
- On Call (2001)
- Partyzone (1987–2004)
- Pimp My Ride UK (2005–2007)
- Select MTV (1996–2001)
- Single AF (2017)
- Strutter (2006–2007)
- Totally Boyband (2006)
- Totally Jodie Marsh (2007)
- Totally Scott-Lee (2005)
- TRL UK (2003–2005)
- Up 4 It (1997–1998)
- US Top 20 (1987–2002)
- The Valleys (2012–2014)
- Videoclash (2000–2001)
- Videoclash Live (2002)

=== Shows imported from MTV US ===
- 16 and Pregnant
- Are You the One?
- Awkward
- Bam's Unholy Union
- Beavis and Butt-Head
- Buckwild
- Catfish: The TV Show
- Celebrity Deathmatch
- The Challenge
- The City
- Clone High
- Cribs
- Daddy's Girls
- Daria
- Date My Mom
- Friendzone
- Girl Code
- Guy Code
- Happy Tree Friends
- The Hard Times of RJ Berger
- The Hills
- Hogan Knows Best
- Human Giant
- I Just Want My Pants Back
- I Used to Be Fat
- The Inbetweeners
- Jackass
- Jersey Shore
- Kesha: My Crazy Beautiful Life
- Laguna Beach: The Real Orange County
- Life of Ryan
- MADE
- Making the Video
- My Super Sweet 16
- Newlyweds: Nick and Jessica
- The Osbournes
- Pimp My Ride
- Punk'd
- The Real World
- Ridiculousness
- Run's House
- Snooki & Jwoww
- Teen Mom
- Teen Mom 2
- Teen Wolf
- The Tom Green Show
- Total Request
- Underemployed
- Viva La Bam
- Washington Heights
- When I Was 17
- Wild 'n Out
- Zach Stone Is Gonna Be Famous

=== Other shows imported from US networks ===
- Acceptable.TV
- Audrina
- Blue Mountain State
- Drawn Together
- The Fresh Prince of Bel-Air
- Hellcats
- Hello Kitty's Furry Tale Theater
- The L.A. Complex
- Pretty Little Liars
- The Secret Life of the American Teenager
- South Park (2005–2013)
- Star (2018–present)

== Subsidiary and sister channels ==
=== MTV HD ===
On 13 February 2012, a high-definition simulcast of MTV called MTV HD launched.

=== MTV Ireland ===
MTV Ireland is an Irish opt-out feed of MTV UK that was launched on 1 December 2003. It features localised advertising and sponsorship for the Irish market. As of February 2019 the broadcasting licence is held by RTTV in the Czech Republic, moving from Ofcom in the UK.

== Special events in Ireland ==
- MTV Resident in Dublin (November 1999)
- MTV Crashes Dublin (March 2000)
- MTV Presents: Street Performance World Championship 2009[5]
- MTV Presents: Oxygen 2009
- MTV @ Arthur's Guinness Day 2010
- MTV Presents Live in Belfast 2010
- MTV Music Week [Belfast) (November 2011)
- MTV Crashes Derry-Londonderry (September 2014)
- MTV Crashes Cork (November 2014)
- MTV Club Tour (2014)
- MTV Crashes Derry (Summer 2015)
- Club MTV Tour (2018)

== Defunct channels ==
=== MTV Extra ===
MTV Extra was launched in 1999 and was a mixture of music videos and repeats of MTV programming. Towards the end of the channel's life, programming was dropped and the channel showed solely music videos (under the "Pure Music" name), with MTV Dance in the evenings. MTV Dance was spun off into its own channel on 20 April 2001, and MTV Extra was renamed MTV Hits at 6am on 1 May 2001. MTV Extra is notable for being the only spin-off MTV channel to use the same song title graphics as its parent channel (although it had its own separate idents).

=== MTV Flux ===
Launched on 6 September 2006, MTV Flux allowed viewers to take "control" of the channel by sending in video clips to MTV Flux's website, and requesting music videos. It was replaced by MTV +1 on 1 February 2008, a timeshift service of MTV. MTV had announced that the "Flux" format would be integrated into its other channels, and so the website still remains.

=== MTV2 ===
MTV2 was launched in 2002 replacing M2. The channel focused on rock and indie music and featured shows such as MTV2 Most Wanted and Gonzo. The channel was replaced with MTV Rocks on 1 March 2010.

=== MTV Shows ===
MTV's general entertainment channel featuring reruns and new episodes of MTV's reality shows. Formerly MTV R until 1 March 2010. The channel ceased operating from 1 February 2011. Its broadcast capacity was relocated to the Music section of the Sky guide for use as MTV Music.

=== MTV Dance ===
MTV Dance was the dedicated dance music channel with music videos and programming of underground and mainstream dance tracks. The channel was replaced with Club MTV on 23 May 2018.

=== MTV Rocks ===
MTV Rocks was a channel dedicated to alternative rock music, with other commercial mainstream music types found on MTV's other music channels. MTV Rocks was previously known as MTV Two and was replaced by MTV Rocks on 1 March 2010. MTV Two was previously MTV2 Europe and M2 respectively. The channel closed on 20 July 2020.

=== MTV OMG ===
Launched on 1 March 2018. MTV OMG was the channel for music and gossip, replacing Viva. The channel closed on 20 July 2020.

=== MTV +1 ===
Launched on 1 February 2008 at midday, this timeshift service of MTV replaced MTV Flux, which in turn had replaced VH2. Trailers for the channel had aired before and after the launch, highlighting the catch-up ability of the new channel. The channel was known as MTV One +1 between 1 February 2008 and 1 July 2009. Coinciding with the closures of MTV OMG, MTV Rocks and Club MTV on 20 July 2020, the timeshift channel also closed as part of this change, along with the timeshifts for MTV Music and Comedy Central Extra.

=== TMF ===
TMF was launched as a free-to-air television channel on Freeview on 30 October 2002 to compete against EMAP's The Hits (now 4Music). It originally started as a non-stop music channel, although the network featured more programming from MTV and its other sister channels from early 2004. The channel was replaced with Viva on 26 October 2009.

=== VH2 ===
VH2 was launched in December 2003 and shown mainly music videos and live concerts. It focused on rock, indie and punk music and branded itself as 'the alternative to manufactured pop'. The channel closed on 1 August 2006 because the main source of income for the channel, ringtone advertising, had slowed down. MTV replaced VH2 with MTV Flux, which was in turn replaced with a timeshift version of MTV.

=== Viva ===
Launched on 26 October 2009, Viva was the new music and entertainment channel, which replaced TMF. The channel shown content from sister channels MTV and Comedy Central, as well as programmes from Nickelodeon and Spike, with some acquired content airing as well. As the only MTV channel sitting on the Freeview platform, it was MTV UK's highest-rating service. The channel unexpectedly closed on 31 January 2018.

=== VH1 ===
VH1 was a channel targeted at 25- to 44-year-olds playing chart and popular music from the 1970s to the present day. It also carried music programming and themed countdown shows from their US counterpart. The channel closed on 7 January 2020.

=== MTV Base ===
MTV Base was a British pay television music channel from Paramount Networks UK & Australia that focused primarily on hip hop, R&B, grime, garage, reggae, funk, soul and dance music. MTV Base closed on 31 March 2022, and was replaced by MTV 90s.

=== MTV Classic ===
MTV Classic was a British pay television music channel from Paramount Networks UK & Australia. The channel was launched in the United Kingdom and Ireland on 1 July 1999 as VH1 Classic. It focused on music videos and music specials from the 1960s onwards, sometimes featuring music videos and concert footage from as early as at least the 1940s or 1950s, such as Bing Crosby's "White Christmas" from 1942. It also aired videos from the 2000s and early 2010s. Every November and December from 2013 until 2021, MTV Classic played Christmas-themed music branded as MTV Xmas. On 31 March 2022, the channel closed down, and was replaced by MTV 80s.

=== MTV Hits ===
MTV Hits was a British pay television music channel, launched on 1 May 2001. The domestic feed of the channel was merged into the European feed on 1 August 2024. The channel closed on 14 April 2025 and was replaced by the second iteration of Club MTV.

=== MTV 90s ===
MTV 90s was a British pay television music channel owned by Paramount Networks UK & Australia that launched on 31 March 2022 replacing MTV Base. It was first launched as a temporary rebrand of MTV Classic from 27 May to 24 June 2016. The channel broadcasts music from the 1990s. The channel closed on 31 December 2025.

=== MTV 80s ===
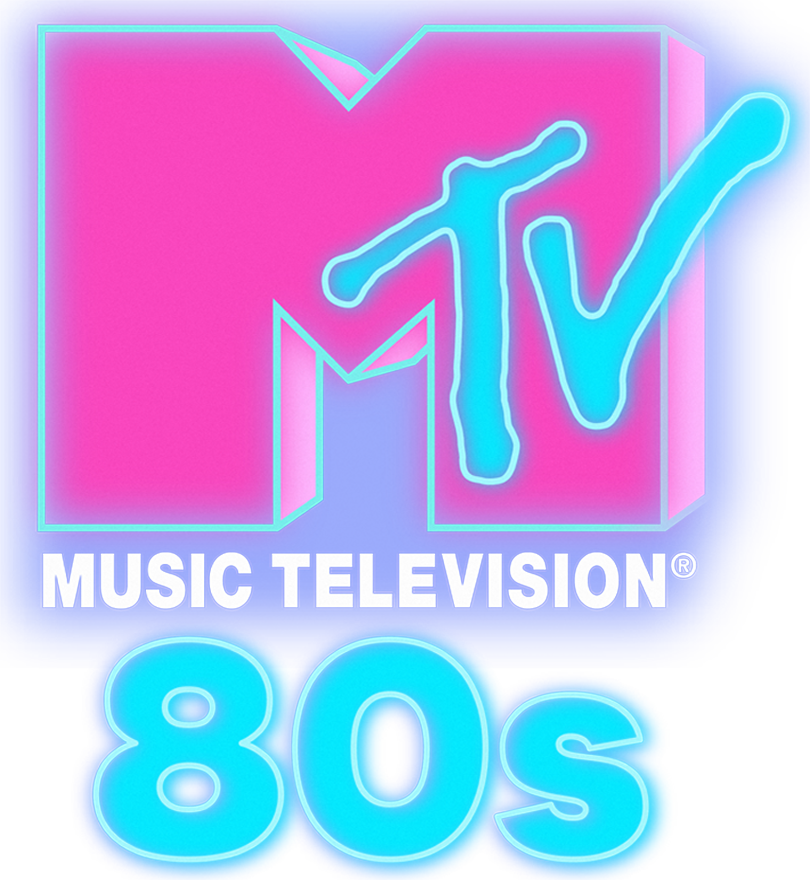
Final logo, used 2022 to 2025

MTV 80s was the British version of the international music TV channel MTV 80s, which began broadcasting on 31 March 2022, replacing MTV Classic and MTV Base. It was first launched as a temporary rebrand of MTV Classic from 28 February to 31 March 2020. The channel broadcasts music from the 1980s. The channels domestic feed was merged into MTV 80's international feed in 2024. The channel closed on 31 December 2025.

The first video to be broadcast on MTV 80s at 6 am on 31 March 2022 was The Sun Always Shines on T.V. by a-ha.

Beginning in the first quarter of 2024, MTV 80's UK feed switched its programming to match the MTV 80's European feed, Unlike the commercial-free European feed, the UK feed includes music videos from other decades, MTV EMA, commercials and airs Teleshopping segments.

At 06:00 GMT on 31 December 2025, MTV 80s (alongside MTV's other music channels) closed, with its final music video being “Together in Electric Dreams” by Philip Oakey and Giorgio Moroder.

It was broadcast via satellite by Sky UK on Channel 353 and via cable by Virgin Media on Channel 284.

Its picture format had a 16:9 aspect ratio and used the 576i SDTV mode.

=== Club MTV ===
Club MTV was a British music television channel, originally launched on 20 April 2001 as MTV Dance. MTV Dance later rebranded as Club MTV on 23 May 2018. The channel originally closed on 20 July 2020 but was relaunched on 14 April 2025, replacing MTV Hits. The channel closed again on 31 December 2025.

=== MTV Music ===
Launched on 1 February 2011 - MTV Music broadcast non-stop music videos, live performances and artist interviews. The channel closed on 31 December 2025.

=== MTV Live ===
Direct from Warsaw and broadcast throughout Europe, MTV Live was a 24-hour standard and high definition music and entertainment channel. The channel was rebranded from MTVNHD to MTV Live HD on 23 April 2012, gaining a standard definition simulcast at the same time. On 29 June 2016, MTV Live HD was replaced by Nick Jr. HD on Sky in the United Kingdom and Ireland but continued on Virgin Media.The channel was closed on 31 December 2025.

== MTV on Pluto TV and 5 ==
Beginning in 2022, some MTV-branded channels began to appear on the British version of the Paramount-owned streaming platform Pluto TV - the move followed on from the establishment of similar streams on Pluto in other territories. The streams are, like the rest of the Pluto TV channels, available at no cost to viewers. As of October 2025, the available services included:

- MTV Reality – screening episodes of MTV's reality shows, in similar manner to the former MTV Shows broadcast channel. This is joined in the "Reality" section of the Pluto guide by dedicated 'box-set' channels for specific programmes, including Catfish: The TV Show, 16 and Pregnant and Pimp My Ride (a dedicated 'MTV On Pluto' subsection of the guide existed for these channels at one point, but has now been disbanded with the reorganisation of the lineup and the relocation of continuing channels into other sections of the guide.)
- MTV Classic – a stream of archive music videos, reusing the name of the former MTV Classic broadcast channel which closed earlier in the year
- MTV Rocks – rock and alternative music, added May 2023, reusing the name of the former linear TV channel which closed in 2020
- MTV Best Of – 'box set' channel featuring a sequence of content themed around a specific named music artist. Added Spring 2024.
- MTV Biggest Pop – one of four international MTV music feeds made available on Pluto in the UK in August 2024 having previously been available elsewhere, and as of 2025 the only one still available in the UK following the removal of the others, this feed plays contemporary chart pop music from around the globe.

The Pluto TV lineup is dynamic and often changes, with some channels offered for a time and then disappearing, and some stations specifically set up to operate for a limited time in conjunction with a particular season or event. As such, the lineup of MTV channels offered on Pluto has fluctuated over the years.

Temporary feeds which have popped up seasonally have included:

- MTV Christmas – a temporary channel in the run-up to the festive season, playing Christmas music videos. Not a simulcast of the broadcast MTV Xmas channel which temporarily replaced MTV 90s on satellite and cable, though the two channels were running an essentially similar format. Run annually at the end of each year since 2022.
- MTV Pride – short-term LGBTQ+ pop-up, appearing annually in the summer since summer 2023, successor to the broadcast MTV Pride which had run between 2015 and 2022 on MTV Classic, MTV OMG and finally MTV 90s.
- MTV Summer Hits – seasonal sequence of upbeat popular music, ran in spring/summer 2024 and again in 2025
- MTV Halloween – added autumn 2025 in several territories including the UK as part of a block of seasonal Halloween-themed film, music and entertainment channels on the Pluto platform.

Feeds which have previously been available but since been removed from the system include:

- MTV Movie Hits – a stream of music videos drawn from film soundtracks, this was the first MTV-branded music channel on Pluto in Britain and remained available until summer 2024.
- MTV Love – a stream dedicated to love songs and ballads, which appeared in early 2023; whereas the previous pop-up MTV Love stunts on TV channels were run in proximity to Valentine's Day, this stream has remained available until summer 2024.
- MTV Queens of Pop – playing music by female and female-led acts. Appeared in the run-up to International Women's Day in early March 2023 and remained until summer 2024.
- Yo! MTV Raps Classic – ran between 2023 and summer 2024, replaying archive content from the hip-hop series; broadcast in tandem with the transmission of a revival of the format on MTV's UK broadcast channels.
- MTV On Tour – live performances, available spring/summer 2024 but removed as part of larger August 2024 revamp.
- MTV Spankin' New – dedicated to new releases and emerging musical talent, this was one of four international MTV Pluto music feeds made available to UK users in August 2024 replacing some of the previously available streams. Withdrawn in August 2025.
- MTV Flow Latino – Latin pop, one of the MTV feeds already available internationally which was added to the Pluto UK lineup in August 2024 and removed in August 2025; UK viewers can still find similar music on other platforms through channels such as Trace Latina, which continues as a streamed channel following the closure of its linear broadcast version.
- Yo! MTV – not to be confused with the Yo! MTV Raps Classic feed, which this essentially replaced in August 2024, this is the international feed of hip-hop content previously available elsewhere; due to strong content this was only accessible on Pluto UK after 9pm. The channel was removed along with Spankin' New and Flow Latino in August 2025.

As of 2025, the MTV Reality, Catfish, Geordie Shore and Teen Mom channels were included alongside a lineup of 5-branded FAST services on Paramount's 5 platform; 5 did not carry the music video streaming feeds, which remained available on Pluto TV.

== Logos ==
Original MTV logo used from 1997 to 2007 and again from 1 July 2009 to 1 July 2011.

MTV One logo used from 22 July 2007 to 30 June 2009.

MTV logo used from 1 July 2011 to 14 September 2021.

MTV logo used from 14 September 2021 – present.

== Awards and nominations ==
Year	Association	Category	Nominee(s)	Result
2017	Diversity in Media Awards	Broadcaster of the Year	MTV UK	Nominated

== See also ==
- VH1 (European TV channel)
- VH1 Classic (European TV channel)
- Club MTV (European TV channel)
- MTV Hits (European TV channel)
- MTV Rocks (European TV channel)
- MTV Ireland
- List of MTV channels
- Viacom International Media Networks Europe
