= Rozema =

Rozema is a Dutch and West Frisian surname.

== Notable people with the surname ==
- Dave Rozema (born 1956), American former Major League Baseball pitcher
- Irene Rozema, West German sprint canoer
- Mischa Rozema (born 1971), Dutch film and commercials director
- Patricia Rozema (born 1958), Canadian film director, writer and producer
- Sander Rozema (born 1987), Dutch former professional footballer
