= MTV Extra =

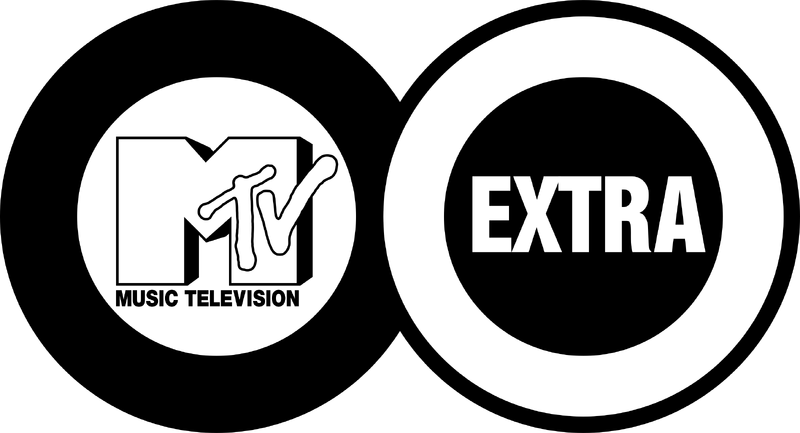
- Country: United Kingdom
- Broadcast area: United Kingdom and Ireland
- Headquarters: London, United Kingdom

Programming
- Language: English

Ownership
- Owner: MTV Networks Europe

History
- Launched: 1 July 1999
- Closed: 1 May 2001
- Replaced by: MTV Hits

Links
- Website: mtv.co.uk

MTV Extra was a music channel by MTV Networks Europe, and a sister network to the main MTV. The channel operated for almost two years, from July 1999-May 2001, when it was replaced with MTV Hits.

== History ==
In February 1999, MTV Networks Europe announced that they would expand its digital multiplex networks with the launch of three-new 24-hour networks on Sky Digital - MTV Extra, MTV Base and VH1 Classic. The company announced that they would all launch on 1 July 1999. The channels began testing in May and officially launched as planned on 1 July.

MTV Extra was categorised as a timeshift service to the main MTV, airing much of the same content, including music videos and repeats of existing MTV programming, at different times of the day. It was the only spin-off of MTV to use the same song title graphics as its parent channel (although it had its own separate idents). At one point, the channel was deemed to be a "harder" version of its sister network.

By May 2000, the channel was reformatted to focus solely on pop music, while dance music played during the evenings. By the end of the year, the channel broadcast under the "Pure Music" and "MTV Dance" monikers.

On 30 March 2001, MTV Networks Europe announced that MTV Dance would be spun off as a standalone network on 20 April while MTV Extra would be renamed MTV Hits. The spin-off was due to the success that the strand on MTV Extra had secured, and so MTV Hits could focus exclusively on pop music. On 1 May 2001, MTV Extra replaced by MTV Hits.

== Other ==
In 2005, Viacom proposed two channels to the Conseil supérieur de l'audiovisuel to obtain a licence to air in the French free digital terrestrial television: Nickelodeon and MTV Extra. Viacom didn't find a French partner and the CSA preferred French groups projects.
