= PostPanic =

PostPanic is a Dutch film company founded in 1997. PostPanic now includes company segments that produce commercial film, long format film and more. They also host and curate the bi-annual PanicRoom. In 2019, the firm rebranded as ThePanics.

== History ==
PostPanic formed back in 1997 when Mischa Rozema, Jules Tervoort and Mark Visser graduated from HKU (Hogeschool Kunst Utrecht) together.

In 2012, PostPanic embarked on their most ambitious personal project to date, SUNDAYS - a feature film idea written and to be directed by PostPanic co-founder Mischa Rozema. This was the first project under their new arm, PostPanic Pictures. Filming took place in Mexico City in November 2012 with US actor Brian Petsos taking on the male lead. The concept short was released on-line in March 2015 and following an auction, Warner Bros secured the rights.

In 2015, PostPanic Pictures announced their second film project, Lost Boy, written and to be directed by duo Ash Thorp and Anthony Scott Burns. In 2017 PostPanic Pictures expanded into episodic drama, developing a new Mischa Rozema collaboration with writer Justin Lockey Editors (band) on The Salvation and The Flock.
