= Nick Jr. (UK & Ireland) =

British-Irish variant of Nick Jr.

- Logo used since 12 February 2024 (Note: The logo's wordmark has been in use since 30 April 2010. Additionally, there is a variant meant to be used for white backgrounds; the main variant has a white (for Nick) and blue (for Jr.) wordmark in conjunction with a fully orange splat.)
- Country: United Kingdom
- Broadcast area: Ireland; United Kingdom
- Headquarters: Sky Campus, Isleworth (1993–1995); Nickelodeon UK, Rathbone Place, London(1995–2012); MTV Networks Europe, Camden, (2012–present)

Programming
- Language: English
- Picture format: 1080i HDTV (downscaled to 576i for the SDTV feed)
- Timeshift service: Nick Jr. +1

Ownership
- Owner: Nickelodeon UK Ltd. (Skydance UK)
- Parent: Nickelodeon Group
- Sister channels: Nickelodeon; Nicktoons

History
- Launched: 1 September 1993 (programming block); 1 September 1999 (TV channel); 24 April 2006; 20 years ago (Nick Jr. 2/Too)

Links
- Website: www.nickjr.co.uk (dead link; redirects to www.nick.co.uk)

Nick Jr. is a children's pay television channel in the United Kingdom and Ireland owned and operated by Paramount Networks UK & Australia. Aimed at preschoolers, it launched as the first full-day preschool-oriented television channel in the United Kingdom and all of Europe on 1 September 1999.

== History ==
=== Early history (1993–1999) ===
Nick Jr. launched as a morning block with Nickelodeon on 1 September 1993. The block aired during the daytime hours from 9 a.m. to 12 p.m. on weekdays though these hours varied over time, particularly when Nick Jr. aired in a breakfast slot in the school holidays (mostly summer time). Its programming was a mix of shows from the American version of Nick Jr. and other imported shows. Later in the block's existence, syndicated British children's programmes would be a main focus of the channel as well. By the late 1990s, it was mostly broadcast between 10 a.m. to 2:30 p.m.

=== Launch as a full channel (1999–2005) ===
On 10 June 1999, Nickelodeon UK announced that Nick Jr. would be spun off as a standalone channel, and that its new branding was being finalised. The channel officially launched on 1 September alongside Nickelodeon timeshift service Nick Replay, becoming the world's first digital television network dedicated to pre-school programming. Programming broadcast on the channel was a mixture of British shows and the rest from the United States and other countries, with programmes at launch including the UK pay television premiere of Bob the Builder and a localised version of Nick Jr. series Blue's Clues hosted by Kevin Duala, alongside a selection of classic programmes such as Thomas the Tank Engine, The Wombles and Paddington Bear. The channel launched on Sky Digital and on the Astra 1B satellite of Sky's analogue satellite service, where on the former the channel ran from 6 a.m. to 7 p.m. while on the latter it was broadcast on a transponder that was shared with Sky Sports 3, where Nick Jr. would air from 6 a.m. to 10 a.m. which would sometimes be altered if sports were being covered in the early morning.

In October 1999, Nickelodeon UK announced plans to expand Nick Jr.'s slot to include a spinoff of the American Noggin channel, but this never materialised outside of the initial announcement.

The Nick Jr. block on Nickelodeon continued until July 2000, before it was closed due to the high uptake of Sky Digital. On 31 August 2000, Nick Jr shut down on analogue satellite.

Beginning on 20 April 2001, MTV Dance started broadcasting during Nick Jr's off-air hours after it was spun off from MTV Extra.

On 4 February 2002, the channel was given its first rebrand with a new look and set of idents. Three programmes premiered on the channel on that day, fellow US programme Dora the Explorer, acquired Jim Henson series The Hoobs, and the channel's first locally-produced series You Do Too. On 19 July, the channel moved its EPG slot on Sky in order for the Nicktoons channel to air on the slot. On 13 August, MTV Dance acquired its own separate channel. By December, Nick Jr. had gained another hour at the end of the broadcasting day, now operating from 6 a.m. to 8 p.m.

On 31 May 2004, Nick Jr. extended its runtime to end at 10 p.m. The additional two hours of broadcast became home to a new retro children's television block named Noggin. This allowed the main network to focus more on newer shows, like Peppa Pig which was co-commissioned by Nick Jr. and Channel 5.

=== Rebrands and expansions (2005–2010) ===
On 5 September 2005, Nick Jr. was given another rebrand, which saw the addition of the then-US mascot Piper O'Possum within continuity links. The Backyardigans premiered on linear UK on the same day of the rebrand. The rebrand also saw the renaming of the Noggin block to Nick Jr. Classics.

On 30 January 2006, Nick Jr. expanded its offerings with the launch of a daytime block under the Noggin brand on TMF from 7 am to 9 am. It used the same branding as the Noggin channel in the US, and aired many Nick Jr. programmes, most of them airing on UK terrestrial television for the first time. Around the same time, an Irish feed of the channel was launched, which shares the same schedule as the UK but features Irish advertising. On 24 April 2006, Nick Jr. 2 was launched as a one-hour timeshift service of the main network, before becoming a standalone sister channel with a separate schedule. On 25 September, the Noggin block was renamed as Nick Jr on TMF.

On 4 January 2009, Nick Jr. Classics was removed from the main Nick Jr., becoming exclusive to Nick Jr. 2. The block would continue on the network until July 2010, with classic British children's series being removed around this time. In early 2009, TMF reverted its Nick Jr block back to Noggin, and it broadcast until March 2010, before it was shut down permanently, at which point VIVA had replaced TMF.

=== 24/7 channel (2010–2013) ===
In February 2010, Nickelodeon UK announced that it would adopt the worldwide rebrand, with Nick Jr. and Nick Jr. 2 gaining the new look during the second half of the year alongside Nicktoons and Nicktoons Replay. This would be the first time the British network would share the same graphics and ident package as the United States. On 2 August 2010, Nick Jr. began broadcasting 24/7, with many older shows from the 2000s being re-added to fill the schedule.

In July 2011, Nick Jr. 2 briefly shifted its sign-on time to 5 a.m., but this was reverted to 6 a.m. a month later.

A 1-hour timeshift named Nick Jr. +1 launched on 2 October 2012, replacing Nicktoons Replay.

By July 2013, Nick Jr. 2 had begun broadcasting 21 hours from 3 a.m. to 12 a.m., with teleshopping off the air.

=== Recent years (2014–present) ===
On 3 November 2014, Nick Jr. 2 was renamed Nick Jr. Too, and it began broadcasting 24/7.

On 5 July 2016, Nick Jr. HD launched on Sky, replacing MTV Live HD's Sky slot.

On 31 October 2022, Sky sold its stake in Nickelodeon UK, including Nick Jr., to Paramount.

== Identity ==
Between the launch of the block in 1993 and the launch of the channel in 1999, Nick Jr UK's branding largely mirrored that of the American feed and used the American version's idents. The UK input (branded as either Banana Sandwich or Nick Jr in the schedules) was presented by Dave Benson Phillips between 1994 and 1996, where Dave was joined by two puppet mascots called Bugsy and Herbie on location around England before the two puppet characters eventually went onto present the block by themselves for the whole of 1996, still on location for a while whilst sometimes presenting in a colourful animated studio, joined by some guest presenters occasionally until they were replaced by Face. Face ran from February 1997 until September 2005 and was dubbed into British English by David Holt. Bugsy and Herbie went on to have their own series of mini-episodes aired on Nick Jr. during the advert breaks in the late 1990s until early 2000s, by which point the puppets were removed completely.

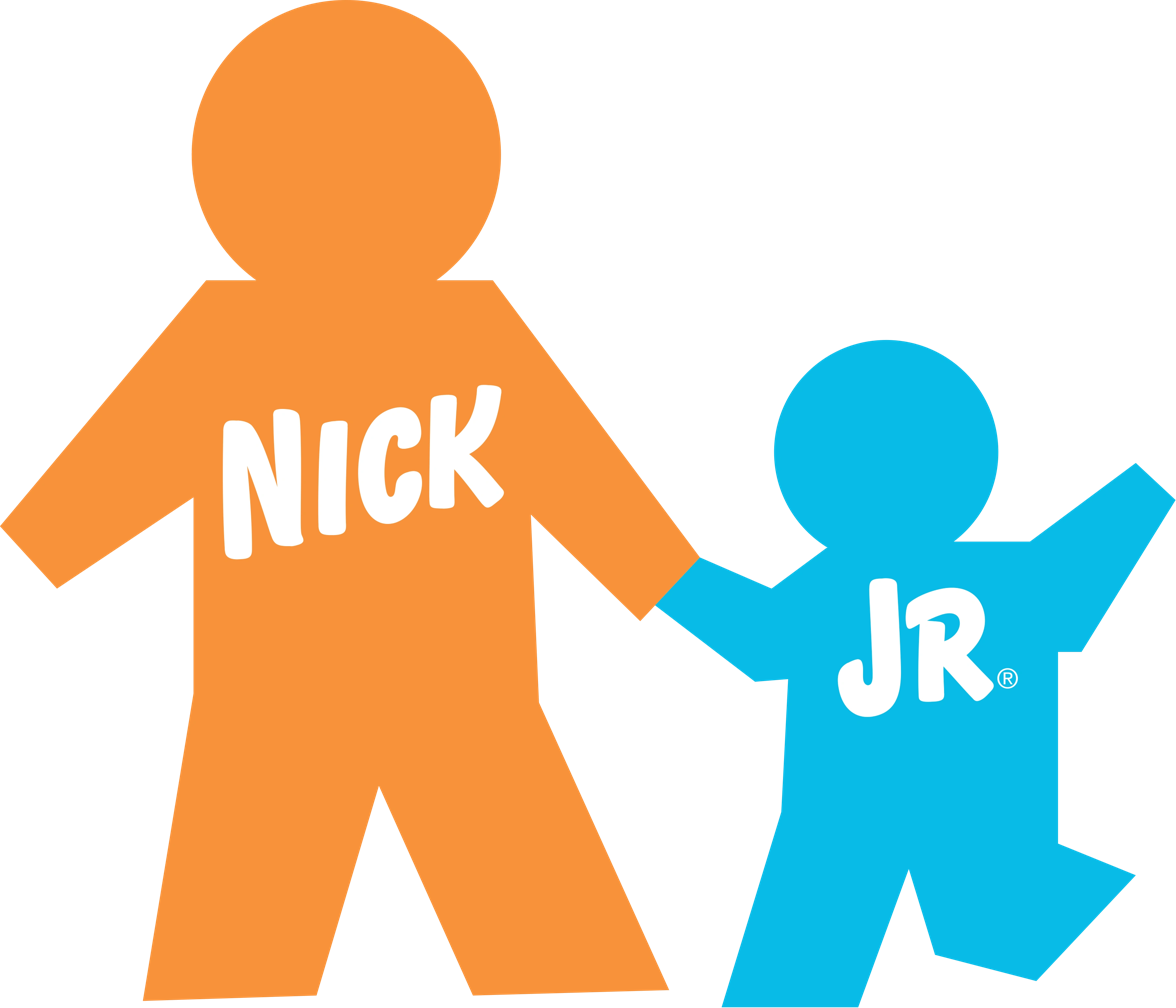
Logo used from 1 September 1999 until 30 April 2010.

Upon the channel's launch in 1999, it launched its own package featuring live-action children playing in a brightly painted studio or holding posters on which clips of programmes appeared. From the channel's launch, Face's hosting job would be shared by the Early Worms, the titular characters of the Early Worms show, Arnie and Barnie. Due to the abundance of British-produced content along with the channel's status as the first dedicated for preschoolers in the UK, the channel positioned itself in a special British image in its early years. Starting in September 2000, just before signing off for the night, it would air a bedtime segment and song hosted by Kevin Duala (host of the British version of Blue's Clues), titled Bedtime Business.

In 2001, the channel transitioned into using Nick Jr. US's ident package, first with up-next bumpers, and combinations of the 1999 idents with idents from the US.

On 4 February 2002, Nick Jr. fully rebranded into the new package, which had a specific jingle and song played in idents. These idents usually consisted of children playing around or dancing, this time in the outdoors, and the logo appeared (either being mushrooms, the stereotypical parent and child, squirrels, dogs, whales, chickens, butterflies, elephants or flowers) in a white circle on a plain brightly-coloured background at the end. On some occasions, they would broadcast atmospheric idents which included babies. Sometimes these idents would air on most of the ad breaks, or sometimes they appeared in split-screen graphics and next bumpers. Promo endboards were added as well.

Dora the Explorer and The Hoobs premiered on the same day of the rebrand. Before signing off at 7 p.m. (8 p.m. after fall 2002), it would air the Bedtime Business segment, followed by a short closedown bumper featuring some characters from Nick Jr. shows and an announcement telling viewers to resume watching at 6 a.m., before cutting to a static yellow screen with the characters and the broadcast times until 6 a.m. the next morning. In fall 2002, they updated their DOG to a much cleaner, organised and less opaque state.

Just before Noggin signed on, an ident showing the logo as two caterpillars played during the last advertisement break at 8 p.m. Then in 2005, this was supplemented with a sting ident of the Nick Jr logo (as two snails) and the Noggin logo spinning around. After Noggin signed off, it would play an ident of a UFO flying away, and cut to a dark blue version of the 2002 signoff screen, just telling viewers to resume watching at 6 a.m.

In July 2004, some in-vision morning presenters were introduced to the network. Neal Wright (Zak) and Jennifer Johnston (Jen) presented and hosted this block simply called "The Garden." Alongside them, there was a puppet plant called Bud, and a blue ball of light/firefly named Izzy.

Also, around this period in 2004, Nick Jr. started to use the 2D American animal idents originally introduced there in 2003, which were eventually removed at some point. At the same time, Nick Jr. began airing the new look of Face to their channel introduced in America the year prior, usually referred to as "Modern Face". He was still voiced by David Holt. Nick Jr. made the unusual decision to not replace the original Face, leaving Modern Face and Face's old look broadcasting simultaneously.

In the spring of 2005, a new animated presenter, Piper O'Possum, appeared on the channel alongside Face at the time, O'Possum presented the UK input of Nick Jr. until its rebrand on 30 April 2010. She was redubbed by Alex Kelly and lasted longer on the UK feed than in the US by three years. Between this time and 4 September 2005, a mix of Old Face, Modern Face, Piper, The Garden, The Early Worms and The Baby Bumpers hosted the channel.

During the significant rebrand of 5 September 2005, Face was removed entirely, The Garden remained but only until October of the same year, and the Early Worms continued to present in the morning. Although Piper became the main presenter for most of the day, in the late afternoons the bumpers with O'Possum were not shown for the rest of the remaining hours and her segments of announcing shows were usually replaced with normal next bumpers. In addition, Noggin was renamed to Nick Jr. Classics and the ident package that had been used since 2002 was removed, as the international versions of Nick Jr. launched a 2D-3D animated pop-up-book-style ident package, with two animals (a parent and a child) forming the Nick Jr. logo, very similar to the package of Nick Jr. on CBS from 2004 to 2006.

This package was designed by Mic Graves and Ben Bocquelet (who would later be known for The Amazing World of Gumball) at British animation studio Studio AKA. At night, special idents were played, which either consisted of existing daytime-setting bumpers converted into a nightly backdrop, or night-specific bumpers that only played during that time. At the end of regular Nick Jr. programmes on both channels, they played the new bedtime song, "Jimmer Jammers", showed a sign-off ident telling viewers to return at 6 a.m., and transitioned to Nick Jr. Classics. After Nick Jr Classics, they would switch to a night loop of the same ident or different idents playing over again.

Idents on Nick Jr. 2 had the number "2" appear at the end of each ident in the scenery. On its launch on 25 September 2006, Nick Jr. on TMF began using the idents. The package would be used on both Nick Jr. channels until 29 April 2010. During the time when Nick Jr, Nick Jr 2. and Nick Jr. on TMF co-existed, the three cross-promoted their programmes under the slogan "Three ways to play".

Between 2008 and 2014, the schedule after 6 p.m. was rebranded as "Nick Jr. Bedtime". A new bedtime look and song ("Land of Dreams") was commissioned and played alongside the already existing night version of the 2005 idents and its song ("Jimmer Jammers"). The Early Worms returned as hosts for the strand (and eventually the last hosts of any Nick Jr. feed internationally). During the strand, special celebrity guests would accompany Arnie and Barnie in reading bedtime stories, akin to those of CBeebies.

Logo used from 30 April 2010 until 12 February 2024.

On 30 April 2010, Nick Jr. rebranded to a variant of the American look and French look designed in-house. They used the animated American idents along with their own which included still shots of children in assorted places or doing activities. Like the American rebrand, it was based on the old arts-and-crafts style and music of Noggin, and was used as the basis for the rebrands of the mainland European Nick Jr. feeds. Moose and Zee from the American Nick Jr. Channel and the Noggin block on Viva (which closed as part of the rebrand) became hosts the main Nick Jr. channel, with Moose's voice being dubbed by David Holt. Similar to the US version of Nick Jr., Moose and Zee presented links between programmes and especially around up-next bumpers, although due to the need for advertisement space, they appeared irregularly and not at night, where they would be replaced by regular next bumpers.

Nick Jr. Classics was rebranded and then discontinued in July 2010. When Nick Jr. and Nick Jr. 2 signed off, they switched to an off-air slide, and then played a night loop of the same ident repeating,.

On 2 August 2010, when the main Nick Jr. began broadcasting 24/7, the Bedtime block continued, airing to 8 p.m. When Nick Jr. 2 expanded its broadcast hours, it broadcast the segment from 7 p.m. to 9 p.m.

However, on 7 January 2013, the channel rebranded again to the then-current American look, which removed Moose and Zee and the arts-and-craft style branding in favour of a 3D CGI world appearing in bumpers and promos where clips of the characters appeared. The Bedtime strand was also revamped under this branding. There were also slight variations between the colour schemes on Nick Jr. and Nick Jr. 2, with the latter opting for a colder colour palette. However, some of the 2010 idents, especially the Christmas ones, were retained until December 2014, albeit with the new Nick Jr. endcap (of the logo changing colour multiple times).

While it was initially the same as the United States version, on 3 November 2014, the main channel was rebranded by Blue Zoo, and the Bedtime strand was removed from both channels, leaving the channel without any hosts for the first time in 19 years. This new branding used CGI and 3D shapes like the previous one and used standard colour schemes for different parts of the day. Nick Jr. Too, however, retained the old style until 2019.

On 18 February 2019, Nick Jr. adopted the branding used in the United States starting in the previous year, featuring live-action children running in a 3D CGI space, often holding bubble wands in which clips of shows appear out of. Bumpers also show these children interacting with the Nick Jr. characters in live-action environments.

=== TMF/Viva block ===
A version of the US Noggin branding was used for the Noggin block on TMF/Viva. It was similar from the American version but was smaller. It was hosted by Moose A. Moose and Zee D. Bird from the American version, with Moose dubbed by David Holt.

=== Slogans ===
- Grow, Learn and Play (1 September 1993 – 1995)
- Just for me! (1 September 1999 – 3 February 2002)
- Join in!/Join-in TV/Join the Fun! (4 February 2002 – 29 April 2010)
- It's the shows that make Nick Jr. (2010)
- Every day's an adventure (7 January 2013 – 17 February 2019)

== Other related services ==
=== Nick Jr. 2/Nick Jr. Too ===
Nick Jr. 2's logo from 30 April 2010 to 3 November 2014.

Nick Jr. Too's logo from 3 November 2014 to 12 February 2024.

Another channel, Nick Jr. 2, was launched on Sky on 24 April 2006. The channel initially functioned as a one-hour timeshift of Nick Jr. before becoming a secondary service. The idents and branding were just the same as the main channel. The differences were that logos on promo endboards and promos, in general, had a 2 included next to them. This also was used in the next bumpers and general idents.

After transitioning as a secondary service, the channel began to air programmes that Nick Jr. had discontinued airing, or shows that never ran on its parent network, such as I Spy, Sali Mali, It's a Big Big World and the Nick Jr. Classics block formerly aired on the main channel.

When it was renamed to Nick Jr. Too on 3 November 2014, it also started broadcasting 24 hours a day.

Since October 2013, the channel has occasionally aired long-term marathons (usually one month) of the British preschool series Peppa Pig, during which it rebrands itself as Nick Jr. Peppa. The channel has since broadcast marathons of the Canadian preschool series Paw Patrol in a similar manner, likewise, rebranding as Nick Jr. PAW Patrol.

Unlike the main channel, Nick Jr. Too is not available on TalkTalk, Eir TV or WightFibre.

=== Noggin/Nick Jr. Classics ===
Noggin's logo from 31 May 2004 – 4 September 2005.

During the mid and late 2000s, Nick Jr. and Nick Jr. 2 presented a nighttime programming block dedicated to classic British children's programmes from the 1970s, 1980s and 1990s under the title Nick Jr. Classics. The block launched under the name Noggin on 31 May 2004, running every night from 8 p.m. to 10 p.m. It was rebranded as Nick Jr. Classics on 5 September 2005.

The block was discontinued on Nick Jr. on 4 January 2009 and on Nick Jr. 2 in mid-late 2010.

=== Noggin/Nick Jr. on TMF/Viva ===
Noggin started broadcasting on 30 January 2006, the first international feed of Noggin (excluding the block on Nick Jr. which only had the name in common). It was a children's television slot broadcast on TMF from 07:00 to 09:00 daily. It showed a selection of Nick Jr shows and often promoted the main channels to viewers with only Freeview and therefore were not subscribed to Nick Jr..

Nick Jr on TMF had replaced Noggin on the block on 25 September 2006, but its programming remained identical. Reasons for the rebrand are unknown, but was likely done to consolidate the brand after the launch of Nick Jr. 2. It used the same ident and presentation package as its main sister channel, Nick Jr. Moose and Zee's segments were removed as well. Programmes shown included Maggie and the Ferocious Beast, Dora the Explorer, The Backyardigans, Thomas & Friends, Blue's Clues, LazyTown, Go, Diego, Go!, Little Bill amongst others. The channels continued to cross-promote each other, including showing the next bumpers for all three at once.

It was reverted to Noggin in early 2009. The final set of programmes shown were Go, Diego, Go!, Dora the Explorer, Little Bear, Bruno and Maggie and the Ferocious Beast. In its final year, Noggin received almost zero cross-promotion from Nick Jr., not even on its website.

Noggin was the first commercial children's television channel launched on 30 January 2006 on TMF to air on the UK's DTT platform, Freeview, followed by CITV, then Playhouse Disney Disney Channel on ABC1.

Following the closure of TMF, the block continued on Viva until March 2010, when the Nick Jr. rebrand caused Noggin to shut down. However, the branding of Noggin and the Moose and Zee segments were adopted by Nick Jr. and used until January 2013.

== See also ==
- Nickelodeon (United Kingdom & Ireland)
- Nicktoons (UK & Ireland)
- Nick at Nite international versions#UK and Ireland
- Nicktoonsters
