= Nicktoonsters =

Short-lived British and Irish television channel

- Country: Ireland; United Kingdom

Programming
- Picture format: 576i SDTV

Ownership
- Owner: Nickelodeon UK Ltd. (MTV Networks Europe/BSkyB)
- Sister channels: Nicktoons; Nickelodeon; Nick Jr.

History
- Launched: 18 August 2008; 18 years ago
- Closed: 31 July 2009; 17 years ago
- Replaced by: Nicktoons Replay

Nicktoonsters was a short-lived British and Irish television channel which launched on 18 August 2008. It was a spin-off channel of Nicktoons UK, targeted towards a younger audience. It broadcast twelve hours per day from 7 am to 7 pm daily, timesharing with Comedy Central Extra +1 (previously Paramount Comedy 2 +1).

== History ==
Nicktoonsters' licence first appeared on the OFCOM website in September 2007.

On 17 July 2008, Nickelodeon UK officially announced the launch of Nicktoonsters on Sky Digital. The network was targeted at a younger audience than Nicktoons, being aimed at a five-to-seven-year-old demographic, while being more female-oriented. Howard Litton, Nickelodeon UK's MD, stated that the network would provide the "Gentler side of animation" and "provide the perfect transition from Nick Jr. and Nicktoons". When the channel launched on 18 August, it began with a week-long marathon of Rugrats before it commenced its regular schedule.

Only eleven months after its launch, the channel ceased operations on 31 July 2009, and the following day, on 1 August, it was replaced with a one-hour timeshift of Nicktoons, entitled Nicktoons Replay. When Nicktoons Replay was replaced with Nick Jr. +1 in October 2012, Comedy Central Extra +1 reclaimed the former slot to allow it to air full time again.

== Programming ==
The schedule for Nicktoonsters mainly consisted of older library content which no longer aired on the main Nicktoons network, ranging from Rugrats, Hey Arnold!, The Wild Thornberrys, CatDog, and As Told by Ginger

In the later months of the channel's existence, newer programmes such as The Fairly OddParents and SpongeBob SquarePants aired on holidays and weekends.

== See also ==
- Nickelodeon (United Kingdom and Ireland)
- Nicktoons (UK and Ireland)
- Nick Jr. (UK and Ireland)
- Nick Jr. Too
