= MTV OMG =

British pay television music channel

- Country: United Kingdom
- Broadcast area: United Kingdom and Ireland
- Network: MTV (UK & Ireland)
- Headquarters: London, England

Programming
- Language: English
- Picture format: 1080i HDTV (downscaled to 576i for the SDTV feed)

Ownership
- Owner: Paramount Networks UK & Australia
- Sister channels: MTV; MTV Base; MTV Classic; MTV Hits; MTV Music; MTV Rocks

History
- Launched: 1 March 2018; 8 years ago
- Closed: 20 July 2020; 6 years ago

Links
- Website: mtv.co.uk/mtv-omg

MTV OMG was a British pay television music channel operated by Paramount Networks UK & Australia. It launched on 1 March 2018, replacing free-to-air sister music channel Viva. The audience profile on Sky Media showed that the channel had a 60/40 viewer bias in favor of women. The channel aired its own weekly OMG Top 20 charts, which were chosen by the channel.

The channel closed on 20 July 2020.

== History ==
The network launched on 1 March 2018, one month after Viva's discontinuation, with a love song-focused video playlist branded as MTV Love airing throughout February. From 2018 until 2020, MTV OMG was temporarily renamed MTV Pride to coincide with Pride in London, which celebrates the LGBT+ community. Before 2018, this temporary renaming was carried out on its sister channel MTV Classic.

=== Closure ===
This channel, along with its sister channels Club MTV and MTV Rocks, was closed permanently on 20 July 2020, folding the channel space that had been established by TMF in October 2002. The last music video played on the channel was "Thank You for the Music" by ABBA.

MTV 00s logo used as a temporary rebrand in 2020
