= Mischa Rozema =

Dutch film and commercials director (born 1971)

Mischa Rozema (born 1971) is a Dutch film and commercial director. He is the co-founder of Dutch film company, The Panics and is known for his use of mixed media in storytelling. Among the ad campaigns with which Rozema has been involved are Liberty Global's A Report of Connected Events and The Fall for Sony PlayStation.

== Original/Branded Content projects ==
- The Flock (Episodic Drama 2018 – Director. Written by Justin Lockey Justin Lockey
- The Salvation (Concept Short/ Episodic Drama 2018 – Director. Written by Justin Lockey Justin Lockey)
- A Report Of Connected Events (Short/ Branded Content for Liberty Global 2018 – Writer & Director)
- MidAir (Concept Short/ Episodic Drama 2017 – Writer & Director)
- 'Sundays' (Concept Short 2015 – Writer & Director)
- Stardust] (Short 2013 – Writer & Director)
- Year Zero (Short/Main Titles for OFFF Festival 2011 – Writer & Director)
- Postman Returns (Short 2008 – Writer & Director)
- Postman (Short 2006 – Writer & Director)

== Awards ==
- Red Dot Design Award (2004) – NIKE Tech Stories One
- ADCN Lamp (2004) (Art Direction) – NIKE Tech Stories One
- ADCN Lamp (2006) (Art Direction) – TMF Awards 2006
- AICP Next Awards – Experiential Category Award Winner (2009) – McDonald's Lost Ring
- Playgrounds Festival (2010) Best International Short Applied – MTV Rocks
- PROMAX BDA (2011) – Best On-Air Ident (Out Of House) – MTV Rocks Loop
- Golden Drum International Advertising Festival (2011) – Golden Drum Award – OFFF Festival 2011 Main Titles 'Year Zero'
- Golden Drum International Advertising Festival (2011) – Virtuoso Award for Cinematography – OFFF Festival 2011 Main Titles 'Year Zero'
- Byron Bay Film Festival 2012 (2012) – Best Experimental Film – OFFF Festival 2011 Main Titles 'Year Zero'
- ADCN Lamp (2012) (Film Direction) – OFFF Festival 2011 Main Titles 'Year Zero'
- One Show Design (2012) – Gold Pencil – OFFF Festival 2011 Main Titles 'Year Zero'
- One Show Design (2012) – Bronze Pencil – MINI Rocketman
- Cannes Design Lions (2012) – National Diploma – OFFF Festival 2011 Main Titles 'Year Zero'
- Holland Animation Film Festival (2013) – Vnap Trade Award – 'Stardust'
- Vuoden Huiput Advertising Awards (2013) – Gold & Best Finnish Tvc Of The Year – Hartwall 'Jaffa Posters'
- ShortCutz Amsterdam Award – Best Experimental Film (2014) – Stardust directed by Mischa Rozema.
- AOC Awards (2018) – Great Storytelling Award – 'A Report Of Connected Events' / Liberty Global
- Golden Drum International Advertising Festival (2018) – Silver Drum Award – 'A Report Of Connected Events' / Liberty Global
- SHOTS Awards (2018) – Gold / Branded Content Entertainment Of The Year (One-Off Project) – 'A Report Of Connected Events' / Liberty Global
