= Nickelodeon (United Kingdom & Ireland) =

British-Irish television channel

- Logo used since 24 July 2023 (Note: The logo's wordmark has been in use since 15 February 2010. Additionally, there is a variant meant to be used for white backgrounds; the main variant has a white wordmark in conjunction with a fully orange splat.)
- Country: United Kingdom
- Broadcast area: Ireland; United Kingdom
- Headquarters: Sky Campus, Isleworth (1993–1995); Nickelodeon UK, Rathbone Place, London (1995–2012); MTV Networks Europe, Camden, (2012–present)

Programming
- Languages: English; Irish
- Picture format: 1080i HDTV (downscaled to 16:9 576i for the SDTV feed)
- Timeshift service: Nickelodeon +1

Ownership
- Owner: Nickelodeon UK Ltd. (Skydance UK)
- Parent: Nickelodeon Group
- Sister channels: Nicktoons; Nick Jr.

History
- Launched: 1 September 1993; 33 years ago

Links
- Website: nick.co.uk

Availability

Terrestrial
- See separate section

Nickelodeon (commonly shortened to Nick) is a British and Irish children's pay television network owned by Skydance. It launched on 1 September 1993, as a localised version of the American channel of the same name in the United Kingdom and launched in Ireland in 2004. In the United Kingdom, the channel is available on Sky, Virgin Media, and TalkTalk Plus TV. In Ireland, the channel is available on Virgin Media Ireland, Eir TV and Sky Ireland. It is the first Nickelodeon feed launched overseas.

== History ==
Nickelodeon was launched in the UK on 1 September 1993, exclusively on Sky as part of the Sky Multichannels package, originally airing for 12 hours from 7am to 7pm. and showing both cartoons and live action series for children. The first cartoon to air on the channel was James the Cat. Nick@Nite was also planned to launch in early 1994 but never implemented; off-air, Nickelodeon would air static logos, schedule information and teletext. In November 1995, it started to timeshare with The Paramount Channel.

The British version of Nick Jr. also launched on the channel's first day, broadcasting during school hours. Live presentation followed in 1994, branded as Nick Alive!, which was soon moved into its own studio in the London Trocadero, and relocated to the station's new headquarters on Rathbone Place in 1995. In 1996, Nickelodeon reached an agreement with CBBC to show a block of CBBC programmes for one hour before and one hour after Nick Jr., called CBBC on Nickelodeon. This block lasted until 1999, when Nick Jr. was removed from the main channel in July 2000, after launching its own channel the year before, and the increase of subscribers to Sky Digital and cable.

Starting in November 1995, Nickelodeon would begin its broadcast an hour earlier on weekdays, at 6 am. When Sky Digital was launched in 1998, it was in the original channel line-up on Astra 2A. On 1 September 1999, two sister channels were launched, Nick Jr. and Nickelodeon Replay (a +1 hour timeshift). On the same day, Nickelodeon started broadcasting from 6 am until 10 pm. However, analogue satellite and analogue cable services continued to follow the weekend 7 am startup and continued to close down the channel at 7 pm each day until Nickelodeon closed on analogue satellite on 30 April 2001. Nicktoons was launched in the UK and Ireland in July 2002.

In December 2004, Telewest failed to reach an agreement to broadcast Nickelodeon (plus Nickelodeon Replay), Nicktoons and Nick Jr. on their services after 2005 and the channels were removed from Telewest on 17 December (as Viacom co-owned the channels with Sky (Telewest also pulled Hallmark Channel and The History Channel off of their service before), Paramount Comedy (also co-owned with Sky) and all of Viacom's Music Channels were unaffected), leading to many Telewest customers leaving for Sky, Homechoice (London area only) and NTL, while Telewest offered either a free upgrade to Disney Channel or to Sky Movies 1-9 and Sky Cinema 1 and 2 to prevent losing any customers. By February 2005, however, Nickelodeon successfully reached an agreement with Telewest and the channels were restored, with a one-month free period before returning back to their respective packages (Essential for Nicktoons and Supreme for the rest of the Nickelodeon Channels., by Early 2007, all the Nick Channels were on Virgin Media's XL package. (formerly Telewest Broadband's Supreme Package) until mid-2007 when Nickelodeon became an L Package Channel (Formerly Essentials on Telewest). followed by Nicktoons in mid-2011)..

Logo used since 15 February 2010, used concurrently with the 2023 logo

In February 2010, Nickelodeon adopted the worldwide rebrand. The TeenNick block also adopted the identity of the channel programs. In April 2010, Nicktoons and Nick Jr. were rebranded as well.

Nickelodeon HD was launched in October 2010 on Sky. Later, it became available on Virgin Media.

On 1 January 2019, it started broadcasting 24 hours a day.

On 31 October 2022, Sky sold its stake in Nickelodeon UK, including Nickelodeon, to Paramount, in an attempt to launch Sky Kids, as owning Nickelodeon UK would have restricted Sky from launching the channel.

On 24 July 2023, Nickelodeon UK rebranded to its 2023 splat logo, just four months and 21 days after United States, Israel and Italy's rebrand.

== Availability ==
=== Cable ===
- Virgin Media UK: Channel 712 (HD)

=== Online ===
- Now TV

=== Satellite ===
- Sky+HD/Q (UK): channels 604 (HD (Note: HD swap. If one has the HD pack, HD version is shown on channel 604, while SD is on 642. Without the HD pack, SD version is on channel 604 with the HD version on channel 642)), 615 (+1) and 642 (SD)
- Sky+HD/Q (Ireland): Channel 604 (SD, with adverts for Ireland), 615 (+1), 620 (HD, with adverts for the UK)

=== OTT ===
- Sky Glass/Stream (UK & Ireland): Channel 205 (HD)

=== Terrestrial ===
- BT UK: Channel 468 (SD) and Channel 475 (HD)

== Ownership ==
Nickelodeon's UK operations was owned by Nickelodeon UK Ltd., which originally operated as a 50-50 joint venture between MTV Networks International and Kidsprog Ltd., a subsidiary of BSkyB formed solely for the launch of the channel. By 2005–2006, the stake was altered so MNA owned 60% and Sky owned 40%.

On 31 October 2022, Sky sold its stake in Nickelodeon UK Ltd., to Paramount International Networks, which means they now own full control of the network. The sale of the stake was so Sky could enter the children's market on their own with the launch of a stand-alone Sky Kids network, which they were not allowed to do due to the Nickelodeon joint-venture.

== Subsidiary and sister channels ==
=== Nick Jr. ===
Nick Jr. logo

Nick Jr. was launched as a block in the UK and Ireland on 1 September 1993, between 9 am to 12 pm on weekday school days on the main Nickelodeon UK channel. It was later expanded to 10 am to 2:30pm. In July 1999, it was announced Nick Jr would be given its own channel, and was launched as a 14-hour (initially 13) standalone channel on analogue and digital television on 1 September 1999, and subsequently the block was discontinued on Nickelodeon in July 2000 (but shortly reintroduced in 2005). Nick Jr. originally timeshared with MTV Dance when that channel launched in early 2001, but after several years, MTV Dance started broadcasting for 24 hours, with Nick Jr. itself broadcasting for 24 hours since 2010.

=== Nick Jr. Too ===
Nick Jr. Too logo

On 24 April 2006, Nick Jr. Too was launched under the name Nick Jr. 2. It broadcasts Nick Jr. shows on a different schedule from the main Nick Jr. channel. It began broadcasting for 24 hours in 2015.

Nick Jr. Too is occasionally used for temporary pop-up channels, including Nick Jr. Peppa and Nick Jr. Paw Patrol.

=== NickToons ===
Nicktoons logo

On 22 July 2002, Nicktoons was launched, airing Nicktoons, as well as other cartoons, throughout the day. It began broadcasting for 24 hours on 1 January 2019.

Similar to Nick Jr. Too, Nicktoons sometimes uses its channel as temporary pop-up channels. In September 2022, the channel was temporarily rebranded as Nick SpongeBob, airing SpongeBob SquarePants and The Patrick Star Show, then in October 2022, it became Nick Horrid Henry, only airing Horrid Henry, then changed back to NickToons in November 2022.

Nicktoons UK mainly airs imported programming from the US network. It's Pony (2020–2022) was created in the UK, but was produced for the American channel and premiered in the US market first.

=== Nick +1, Nicktoons +1 and Nick Jr. +1 ===
On 1 September 1999, a one-hour time shift of Nickelodeon was initially launched on Sky. It is available on Sky 620, Virgin Media Ireland 605 and Virgin Media 713. The channel originally launched as Nick Replay but was rebranded as Nick +1 on 2 October 2012.

A one-hour timeshift of Nicktoons, Nicktoons Replay, was also available on Sky channel 630. The timeshift channel replaced the Nicktoons spin off sister channel Nicktoonsters.

Nick Jr. +1 launched on 2 October 2012, replacing Nicktoons Replay, which closed the previous day. The timeshift channel is available on Nicktoons Replay's previous space.

=== Nickelodeon Ireland ===
In 2004, The channel launched an Irish advertising feed for Nickelodeon.

An Irish feed for Nick Jr. was launched in 2006. On 13 September 2012, it was announced that Sky would be launching an Irish feed of Nicktoons on 16 October 2012. All Nickelodeon channels available in Ireland now broadcast Irish advertising and sponsorship.

=== Nicktoonsters ===
On 18 August 2008, Nicktoonsters was launched. Its licence first appeared on the Ofcom website in September 2007 (initially named "Nicktoons 2", and changed to Nicktoonsters on 3 July 2008). The channel closed on 31 July 2009 and the next day was replaced by Nicktoons Replay.

== Programming ==
Over the years the network has produced series including Genie in the House (2006–2009), Summer in Transylvania (2010–2012), Goldie's Oldies (2021) and Overlord and the Underwoods (2021). Apart from local continuity programming including Nickelodeon UK Kids' Choice Awards, Camp Orange and Nickelodeon Slimefest, Nickelodeon UK mainly airs imported programming from the US network. House of Anubis (2011–2013) were created in the UK, but were produced for the American channel and premiered in the US market first.

== Kids' Choice Awards ==
Traditionally, the Kids' Choice Awards in the United Kingdom and Ireland before 2007 included only an airing of the original ceremony from the US. Nickelodeon UK from then on held a full ceremony for two years in 2007 and 2008 which included a fully local slate of categories and was held at the ExCeL London. The UK-specific awards ceremony for 2009 was cancelled due to network budget cuts, and in the 2010s, several local categories were voted by children in the United Kingdom and Ireland, which were awarded each year by Nickelodeon presenters as continuity during the airing of the American ceremony on a one-day delay.

== Nickelodeon Land ==
Nickelodeon Land is a section of the Blackpool Pleasure Beach resort in Blackpool which is a six-acre (2.4 ha) section of the park featuring themed Nickelodeon attractions and souvenirs. The Nickelodeon Land section of the park opened in April 2011.
