= Nicktoons (UK & Ireland) =

British-Irish television network

- Logo used since May 1, 2024 (Note: The logo's wordmark has been in use since April 30, 2010. Additionally, there is a variant meant to be used for white backgrounds; the main variant has a white (for Nick) and green (for Toons) wordmark in conjunction with a fully orange splat.)
- Country: United Kingdom
- Broadcast area: Ireland; United Kingdom

Programming
- Languages: English; Irish
- Picture format: 16:9 576i SDTV
- Timeshift service: Nicktoons Replay (replaced by Nick Jr. +1)

Ownership
- Owner: Nickelodeon UK Ltd. (Skydance UK)
- Parent: Nickelodeon Group
- Sister channels: Nickelodeon; Nick Jr.

History
- Launched: 22 July 2002; 24 years ago
- Former names: Nicktoons TV (2002–04)

Links
- Website: www.nicktoons.co.uk (dead link; redirects to www.nick.co.uk)

Nicktoons is a British and Irish pay television channel launched on 22 July 2002 as Nicktoons TV. It is a cartoon-centric sister channel to Nickelodeon. The channel airs Nickelodeon's original animated series, as with all of the Nickelodeon networks domestically.

== History ==
On 9 May 2002, the management at Nickelodeon UK proposed plans to launch a British version of Nicktoons TV following the successful launch of the US version. Statements from Nickelodeon UK co-owners BSkyB and Viacom had not yet been finalised. On 10 June, the company officially announced that Nicktoons TV would launch on 22 July on Sky Digital and NTL:home Digital. By 9 July, the channel began tests on NTL and on 19 July, Nick Jr. moved to channel 624 on Sky, to vacate its original 606 number for Nicktoons to launch on the following Monday. During this time, it showed a static screen with the Nicktoons TV logo and a notice displaying Nick Jr.'s new slot. While not available on the service at launch, the channel was added to Telewest Active Digital at the end of October.

On 12 October 2004, Nicktoons TV was rebranded to Nicktoons. The rebrand featured the Pixel characters as the channel's first mascots, designed by Slomo Productions and directed by Filipe Alcada.

On 17 February 2007, there was another rebrand featuring 4 mascots; Rooftop (a moose), Beat (a mouse/rat), Colin (a brain) and Spoon (a humanlike creature), designed by Studio AKA.

The new 'worldwide rebrand' logo for Nicktoons was introduced on 30 April 2010, with a new imaging campaign introduced on 11 February 2012. On 21 June 2013, some new idents made by Stu Gamble and StudioEDP titled "30 Seconds Of Fame" or just "30SOF" for short were introduced, featuring a singing monster-like person 'moving his body to the beat' to Space Funk by Jeffrey W Wade & Ruben Ayala (Minimal Dancer), a rapping grandad and a dog (G-Daddy), an Octopus who is a musician (Rocktopuss), a girl with a British accent reading a book of which being Little Red Riding Hood with her 'big gob' (Gobby Girl) and a singing blob who sings the song Bopalopalama Dipdip by David Bronze & Josh Phillips (Doo-Wop Blob). These idents came along with the 2014 rebrand as well, with another batch being named "30 Seconds Of Fame 2" or just "30SOF 2" for short in 2015. On 3 November 2014, there were new idents introduced with the eyes and faces of characters from shows.

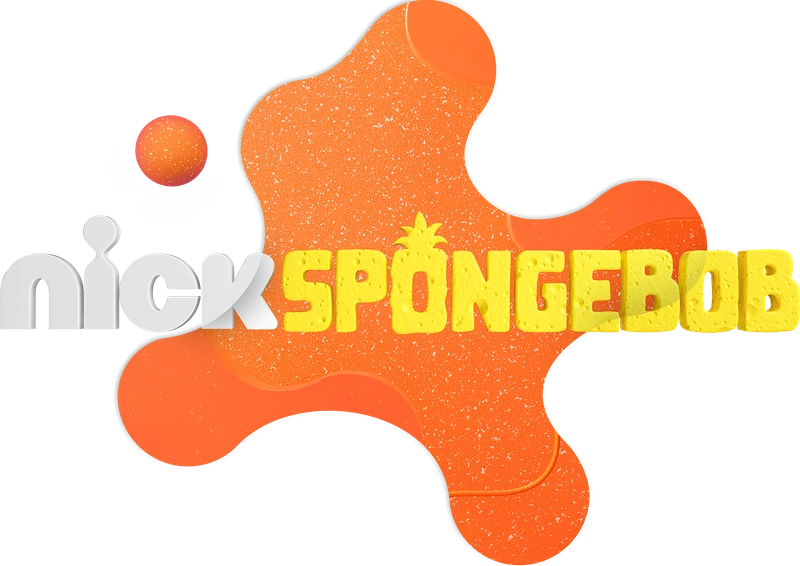
The 2024 logo of NickSpongeBob.

In the autumn of 2022, the network began taking on several temporary brandings reflected in electronic program guides in concert with month-long marathons of several series, including NickSpongeBob, NickHorrid Henry and NickLoud House.

On 31 October 2022, Sky sold its stake in Nickelodeon UK, including Nicktoons, to Paramount.

In March 2026 and the summer holidays the channel had temporarily rebranded into NickAlvinnn!!!, as the show's first pop-up channel. This shows non stop ALVINNN! And The Chipmunks content.

== Sister channels ==
=== Nicktoonsters (closed) ===
On 18 August 2008, a new spin-off channel to Nicktoons was launched under the title of Nicktoonsters. The channel was exclusive to Sky. The channel broadcast older programming which was dropped from the main Nicktoons schedule prior to launch. It took up half the time of a channel space shared with Comedy Central Extra +1. The channel closed on 31 July 2009 and was replaced with a 1-hour timeshift of Nicktoons, Nicktoons Replay on 1 August 2009.

=== Nicktoons Replay (closed) ===
A +1 feed of Nicktoons known as Nicktoons Replay launched in place of Nicktoonsters on 1 August 2009. It was known as Nicktoons +1. The channel was discontinued 1 October 2012, with Comedy Central Extra +1 again in full control of the channel slot's airtime. Nicktoons Replay's old EPG position was used to launch a one-hour timeshift of Nick Jr., titled Nick Jr. +1.

=== Nicktoons Ireland ===
On 13 September 2012, it was announced that Sky would be launching an Irish feed of Nicktoons. It launched on 16 October 2012.

== Programming ==
=== Programming blocks ===
In 2004, when Nicktoons TV extended its hours, the 19:00 – 22:00 slot was called Toonz2Nite (extended further to 23:00 in November 2005). This had a separate, distinct presentation from the main channel, and the programmes shown were generally aimed at older children. The network began airing shows from NickSplat on 9 January 2017 until they stopped for unknown reasons around February 2017.

== See also ==
- Nickelodeon (United Kingdom & Ireland)
- Nick Jr. (UK & Ireland)
- Nicktoonsters
- Nick at Nite International versions
- TeenNick
