= MTV Rocks (UK and Ireland) =

24-hour alternative music MTV network channel

- Country: United Kingdom and Ireland
- Network: MTV

Programming
- Language: English
- Picture format: 1080i HDTV (downscaled to 16:9 576i for the SDTV feed)

Ownership
- Owner: ViacomCBS Networks UK & Australia
- Sister channels: MTV; Club MTV; MTV Base; MTV Classic; MTV Hits; MTV Music; MTV OMG

History
- Launched: 10 September 1998; 28 years ago
- Closed: 20 July 2020; 6 years ago
- Former names: M2 (1998–2000); MTV2 (2000–2007); MTV Two (2007–2010)

Links
- Website: mtv.co.uk/mtv-rocks

MTV Rocks (formerly MTV Two, MTV2 Europe and M2) was a British pay television music channel that was operated by ViacomCBS Networks UK & Australia. Its programming consisted of 24-hour non-stop rock/alternative music.

The channel closed on 20 July 2020.

== Format and history ==
The structure of the MTV Networks is different in Europe from in the United States and so the role that MTV Two plays is somewhat different. The various nation MTV channels remain the flagship channels bringing a wide variety of popular music and many different show formats (including documentaries, reality TV, charts, text shows, and countdowns) however digital satellite in the UK has allowed MTV to operate subsidiary channels with their own specialist areas. So while in the US MTV2 was a varied, slightly alternative channel in the past, in Europe MTV Two was dedicated exclusively to alternative rock and indie, with the occasional alternative hip hop song; while other music output carried on MTV Base, MTV Dance, and MTV Hits covering urban music (hip hop, rap, R&B and garage), electronic dance music, and chart music respectively.

MTV Rocks initially began as M2 in October 1998. The channel initially had limited distribution, being available in the United Kingdom, Ireland, Scandinavia, France, and Spain.

On 1 May 2000, M2 was rebranded to MTV2, similar to the rebranding on its sister network in the United States. The structure of MTV2 in the United States differed from its European counterpart. MTV2 Europe primarily focused on alternative indie-themed shows and music videos, while MTV2 in the US focused on reality TV programming, alternative music videos, and alternative hip-hop.

In 2000, the channel developed the first example of "360-degree programming": Viewers could choose an hour's worth of music and idents using the website, which would be broadcast usually throughout the night with little or no manipulation by the channel. Viewers would be emailed their transmission time, selection, and the option to forward to friends. It was one of the first 100% Adobe Flash websites. The TV station was one of the first media outlets for its marketing strategy to lead with its website and followed with TV programming. Viewers could program an hour of television content via the website, designed by Toby Barnes (who led MTV Interactive at the time, later Mudlark), Brad Smith, and Mickey Stretton (from the agency Digit). The website won a number of awards, including a BAFTA Interactive Entertainment Award. In the late 2000s, MTV2 Europe began to air a range of reality programming, but music was still the main focus of the channel.

In September 2002, MTV2 Europe introduced its own on-screen presentation and graphics, and started to use much more original programming, the jewel in the station's crown being Gonzo, hosted by the then MTV UK & Ireland DJ and former BBC Radio 1 DJ Zane Lowe and regularly featuring interviews with bands along with contributions from members of the MTV2 Internet forums. It was relaunched in 2006, moving from an hour-long format broadcasting every weekday to a single two-hour show on a Friday. The show won the NME Award for Best TV Show in 2006. Unlike other MTV channels available in Europe which have regular commercial breaks, MTV 2 (as it was) ran without any advertising (apart from MTV promotions and idents) for large parts of the day, which was eventually reduced to midnight to 6 pm every day. Commercials shown were mainly for albums, DVDs, films and products that target the channel's main audience. However, from September 2005, MTV2 started to play these commercials during daytime, but still runs without interruptions throughout the night from 1 am.

In 2007, following a rebranding of MTV's channels available in the United Kingdom, MTV2 Europe was briefly rebranded as MTV Two and the presentation was changed as part of MTV's wider efforts to amalgamate the five British MTV channels into a singular brand with a common identity: the new logo is similar to the other channels, with the channel's playlist represented by a South Park-esque character who plays a Flying V guitar.

On 1 March 2010, MTV Two was rebranded as MTV Rocks. The channel now reflects a similar on-air identity as other MTV Networks International's channels. The channel has a similar playlist and schedule as MTV2 Europe for the time being.

On 10 January 2011, MTV Rocks launched in Italy replacing MTV Brand New.

MTV Rocks began broadcasting in widescreen on 6 March 2012.

In 2018 and 2019, MTV Rocks was temporarily rebranded as VH1 Christmas, which played Christmas-themed music until Boxing Day. Unlike MTV Xmas, it also played regular pop/mixed hits until early January. VH1 Christmas was formerly aired on VH1 from 2017 and was moved to MTV Rocks due to the former now being an entertainment channel. However, during HIV Awareness day, it used the MTV Rocks logo.

== Closure ==
This channel, along with its sister channels Club MTV and MTV OMG, was closed on 20 July 2020, with a chart based on the channel's former content moving to/airing on MTV Music. The final music video played on the channel was "Don't Look Back in Anger" by Oasis.

=== Pluto TV revival ===
In May 2023, a rock music video feed under the MTV Rocks name was added to the UK service of Paramount Global streaming platform Pluto TV. This followed the 2022 introduction of an MTV Classic-branded stream and other thematic MTV music channels, some seasonal, to the platform.

== European version ==
In 2014, MTV Rocks, as well as MTV Hits and MTV Dance, started broadcasting European versions, without commercials or teleshopping and without VH1 Christmas. The channels have a Czech license.

== Programming ==
- (artist): In Rotation
- (artist) vs. (artist)
- 00s Indie Anthems
- 00s Nu-Rave
- 70s Calling
- 80s vs 90s Rock Legends
- All Night Session
- Bands of the 10s
- Biggest! Hottest! Loudest!
- Pop Punk vs the World
- Indie House Party Anthems
- MTV Rocks: Thnks fr th Mmrs
- MTV Unplugged
- Rock Solid Playlist
- Smells Like 90s Anthems
- Supersonic 90s Anthems
- Then vs Now
- Top 5 / Top 10 / Top 20 / Top 30 / Top 50 / Top 100
- Ultimate 10s Playlist
- Ultimate 21st Century Anthems
- Ultimate Weekend Anthems
- VH1 Christmas (during Christmas period of each year)
- Weekend Rocks
- What's the Story? Morning Glory

== Previous programmes ==
Themed slots used to be a regular feature on the channel, as well as SMS-oriented shows, showing viewers' text messages in an on screen chat forum, and shows like The Takeover where artists like Sonic Youth, Fall Out Boy, The Futureheads as well as former Faith No More lead singer Mike Patton present videos they have chosen from the MTV archives. The majority of the channel's output was made up of back-to-back music videos, with shows such as Beavis and Butt-Head and Daria aired occasionally.

- The 10 Biggest Tracks Right Now: a selection of the top 10 newest and freshest music videos.
- Gonzo: a weekly music magazine show with the best in alternative and indie music videos and interviews hosted by Alexa Chung from 15 October 2010. The show was previously presented by New Zealander MTV VJ Zane Lowe.
- Gonzo Loves...: a music video featuring non-stop alternative and indie music videos.
- Gonzo on Tour: a yearly live music event which tours Ireland and the United Kingdom.
- Newest Noise: the freshest music videos back-to-back.
- The Official UK Rock Chart: the official rock chart based on airplay and sales in the United Kingdom hosted by Phil Clifton.
- M2 Europe
  - Dodger Zone (M2): a nightly music video show hosted by an animated dog.
  - M2 Creators: a daily music video show selected by viewers.
  - M2 Startracks: a music video shows hosted by artists and bands.
- MTV Rocks
- MTV2 Europe
  - 120 Minutes: From early 2005, MTV Rocks started broadcasting the alternative music show every night, instead of its previous timeslot of Saturday nights. The show airs nightly at 1 a.m. and runs without commercials. A 120 Metal Minutes show broadcast on Friday nights until it was cancelled in April 2006.
  - Daria
  - Dirty Sanchez
  - Jackass
  - Headbangers Ball timeslot on Tuesday and Saturday evenings.
  - MTV2 Riot: a weekly heavy metal music show
  - Text, Drugs and Rock 'n' Roll (MTV2): interactive music show where viewers text in their requests.
  - Viva La Bam
  - Wonder Showzen

== Past VJs ==
- Alexa Chung
- Phil Clifton
- Zane Lowe

== Special events ==
In recent years, MTV Two has taken Gonzo on different tours of the United Kingdom. Gonzo on Tour has been a regular tour for the past two years, touring various Barfly venues and filming the results for broadcast on the channel. Bands such as The Eighties Matchbox B-Line Disaster, Goldie Lookin' Chain, Franz Ferdinand, Queens of the Stone Age, Kaiser Chiefs and Maxïmo Park have played in the past, and in 2005 the tour featured bands such as The Rakes, Arctic Monkeys, Editors, and The Subways headlining one venue each, with support from Test Icicles and Be Your Own Pet.

In May 2006 the channel held a series of gigs at Brighton's Great Escape festival, with The Futureheads, The Cribs and Mystery Jets headlining alongside bands such as Metric, The Sunshine Underground and The Fratellis; the gigs were filmed and broadcast a few weeks later alongside interviews and backstage clips.

Other live events MTV Two have staged include the Bandwagon Tour featuring Viva Voce, Clor, The Departure and The Kooks, along with gigs at SXSW and coverage of the Reading and Leeds festivals.

In November 2006, MTV Two hosted its first Spanking New Music Tour where Fields, Forward Russia and The Maccabees supported headliners Wolfmother, with live footage from the Brixton Academy gig broadcast in a Gonzo special.

== Logos ==
Logo used between 1 September 2000 and 22 July 2007

Used between 22 July 2007 and 1 March 2010

Logo used from 1 March 2010 – 1 July 2011

Logo used from 1 July 2011 – 1 October 2013

Logo used from 1 October 2013 – 5 April 2017

Final logo used from 5 April 2017 – 20 July 2020

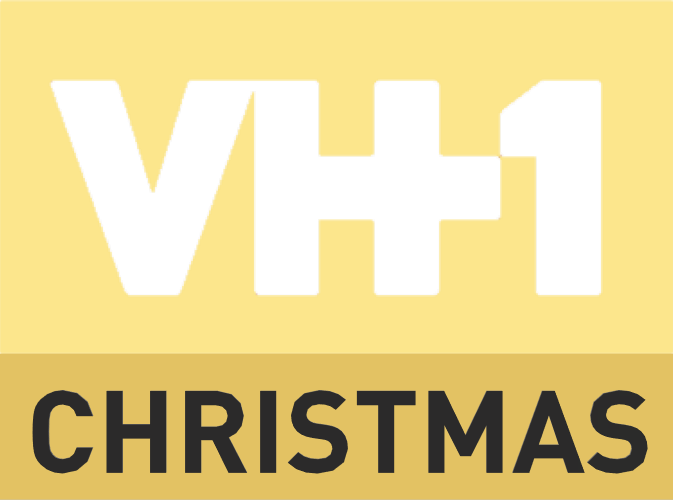
VH1 Christmas logo.

MTV Rocks' on-air identity has been produced by Dutch graphic design team PostPanic. MTV Rocks reflects MTV Networks Internationals on-air and off-air branding. The graphics were commissioned by MTV Networks Internationals design team MTV World Design Studio who have created the original MTV Popx1000 branding.
