= MTV Music (UK & Ireland) =

2011–2025 British television channel

- Final logo, used from 2021 to 2025
- Country: United Kingdom
- Broadcast area: United Kingdom and Ireland
- Network: MTV

Programming
- Language: English
- Picture format: 1080i HDTV (downscaled to 576i for the SDTV feed)
- Timeshift service: MTV Music +1 (2016–2020)

Ownership
- Owner: Paramount Networks UK & Australia
- Sister channels: MTV; MTV 80s; MTV 90s; Club MTV; MTV Live

History
- Launched: 1 February 2011; 15 years ago
- Replaced: MTV Shows
- Closed: 31 December 2025; 10 months ago

Links
- Website: mtv.co.uk/mtv-music

MTV Music was a British pay television channel operated by Paramount Networks UK & Australia. The brand was first launched in the UK and Ireland before launching in Australia, New Zealand, Italy, the Netherlands and Poland. Unlike other MTV Music channels, this channel offered subtitles on selected programmes.

== History ==
As the main MTV brand had deviated from its original purpose and faced increased competition from other music channels and online services, Viacom International Media Networks introduced MTV Music as a new non-stop music channel in 2011. The channel launched on 1 February 2011 in both the United Kingdom and Ireland. The channel replaced MTV Shows.

On 1 February 2011, on Sky UK and Sky Ireland, MTV and MTV Shows swapped positions in the EPG where MTV became part of the Entertainment channels and MTV Shows was moved to the Music channels and renamed MTV Music. MTV Shows programming was transferred to MTV, while MTV Music was dedicated to playing music videos, similarly like its sister channels MTV Base, MTV Classic, MTV Dance, MTV Hits, MTV Rocks and MTV Live.

MTV Music began broadcasting in widescreen in the UK & Ireland on 28 March 2012. On 15 February 2016, MTV Music +1 launched in the UK on Sky channel 358, replacing the standard-definition version of MTV Live HD. Following the closures of MTV OMG, MTV Rocks and Club MTV on 20 July 2020, MTV Music broadcast a weekly chart based on MTV Rocks programming on Sundays. The timeshift channel also closed as part of this change, along with the timeshifts for MTV and Comedy Central Extra.

On 8 September 2022 at 22:00 BST, MTV Music (along with MTV Hits, MTV 80s, MTV 90s in the United Kingdom/Ireland and MTV Live in Europe, MENA, Latin America, and Asia) temporarily suspended its regularly scheduled programming, due to the death of Queen Elizabeth II. As a result of the suspension of regular programming on all of MTV's music channels in the United Kingdom, two music video programmes were created in order to fill the gap, one being "Programming Pause" (which it was broadcast from 8 September 2022 at 22:55 until 10 September 2022 at 06:00 BST) and the other being "Nothing but Music" (which it was broadcast from 10 September 2022 at 06:00 BST until 13 September 2022 at 06:00 BST). Both of these programmes played laid back and sombre music videos. Regular programming for all of MTV's music channels in the United Kingdom/Ireland were resumed on 13 September 2022 at 06:00 BST, while MTV Live resumed its regularly scheduled programing 4 hours earlier at 02:00 BST.

On 19 September 2022, all of MTV's music channels in the United Kingdom/Ireland temporarily suspended its regularly scheduled programming (including teleshopping programmes) and it was replaced with the music programme "Nothing but Music" (also known "Nothing but Hits" on MTV Hits, "Nothing but 80s" on MTV 80s and "Nothing but 90s" on MTV 90s) on that day, due to the state funeral of Queen Elizabeth II.

On 6 July 2024, MTV Music alongside its sister channel MTV Hits stopped airing 'The Official UK Top 20/40' and 'The Official Chart Update' and instead airs 'This Week's MTV Top 20'.

On 17 October 2024, after the death of Liam Payne. MTV Music, along with MTV Live and MTV Hits (UK and International), temporarily suspended their usual programming until 4 a.m. on Friday, 18 October to play Liam Payne: A Tribute, a music program that played all of his music videos as a tribute to the singer's legacy.

In March 2025, MTV Music and MTV Live (HD, International) changed its on-air idents from old (similar to UK feed of MTV music channels since 2021) to new on-air idents (similar to European feed of MTV music channels since 2021).

=== Closure ===
In October 2025, when Paramount Networks UK & Australia's parent Paramount Global merged with David Ellison's media entertainment Skydance Media into Paramount Skydance two months prior in August of that year, Paramount Networks UK & Australia decided to close five of its MTV-branded UK music pay-TV channels, including MTV Music, at the end of December 2025 due to the company's restructuring policy.

The last music video to play on MTV Music was "Video Killed the Radio Star" by The Buggles, which was the first song to play on MTV in the US when it first launched on August 1, 1981, at 12:01 a.m, as well as the last one to air on the first incarnation of MTV Philippines before it was shut down back in 2010.

== Regional channels ==
=== Pan-European ===
A pan-European version of the channel. The channel consisted of non-stop music videos 24-hours a day. The channel ceased broadcasting in June 2021. The channel was registered with the broadcasting regulator RRTV in the Czech Republic. MTV Music 24 was available in Austria, Croatia, Denmark, Finland, Germany, Hungary, Israel, Latvia, Lithuania, Luxembourg, Malta, Netherlands, Norway, Poland, Portugal, Slovenia, Spain, Sweden, Switzerland and South Africa. Previously, MTV Music UK was made available across Europe.

==== Ireland ====
MTV Music Ireland launched on 31 October 2013. It was a simultaneous broadcast of the UK version with Irish local advertising/sponsorship MTV Music Ireland ceased broadcasting from 31 May 2019 and the channel was replaced with the UK version.

==== Italy ====
MTV Music channel launched in Italy on 1 March 2011, replacing MTV Plus. MTV Music Italy closed on 31 December 2025 and was removed from Sky on 5 January 2026.

==== Australia and New Zealand ====
On 3 December 2013 VIMN launched the channel in Australia replacing MTV Hits. On 1 December 2015, MTV Music launched in New Zealand on Sky Television, replacing both MTV Hits & MTV Classic. The channel was closed on 1 July 2020 and replaced by MTV Hits Australia & New Zealand.

==== Poland ====
MTV Music launched in Poland on 17 October 2017, replacing VIVA Poland after 17 years of broadcasting. MTV Music closed in Poland on 3 March 2020 and was replaced by MTV Music 24.

== Logos ==
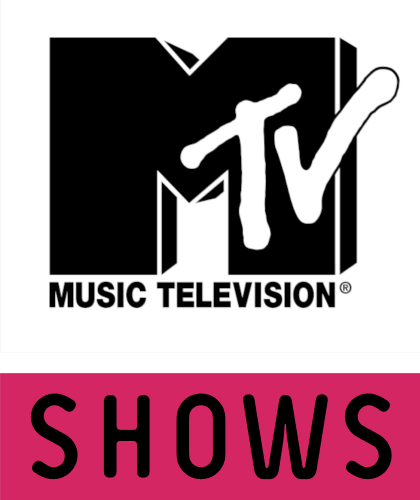
MTV Shows Logo used from 1 March 2010 to 31 January 2011.

MTV Music Logo used from 1 February 2011 to 30 June 2011.

MTV Music Logo used from 1 July 2011 to 30 September 2013.

MTV Music Logo used from 1 October 2013 to 4 April 2017.

MTV Music Logo used from 5 April 2017 to 13 September 2021

Final Logo used from 14 September 2021 to 31 December 2025
