= MTV Base (UK and Ireland) =

British pay television channel

- Final MTV Base UK logo, used until 31 March 2022.
- Country: United Kingdom
- Broadcast area: United Kingdom, Ireland
- Network: MTV

Programming
- Language: English
- Picture format: 16:9 576i SDTV

Ownership
- Owner: Paramount Networks UK & Australia
- Sister channels: MTV; MTV Classic; MTV Hits; MTV Music

History
- Launched: 1 July 1999
- Closed: 31 March 2022; 4 years ago
- Replaced by: MTV 90s

Links
- Website: mtv.co.uk/mtv-base

MTV Base was a British pay television music channel from Paramount Networks UK & Australia that focused primarily on hip hop, R&B, grime, garage, reggae, funk, soul and dance music. It was launched as part of MTV's digital offering of music channels on 1 July 1999 in both the United Kingdom and in Ireland.

MTV Base closed on 31 March 2022, and was replaced by MTV 90s. The last video on the channel was "Shutdown" by Skepta. The channel continued to broadcast in Africa until 1 January 2026.

== Regional channels ==
The channel was previously available in other European countries, but was replaced by the now-defunct MTV Dance (replaced by Club MTV) channel from March 2008.

=== Pan-European ===
A pan-European version was planned to launch in 2015.

=== Africa ===
MTV Base Africa launched in February 2005 throughout the African continent. On 3 July 2013, Viacom International Media Networks Africa launched a localised feed of MTV Base exclusively for South Africa, with local programming, advertising and VJs. The channel was closed on 1 January 2026.

=== France ===
MTV Base was launched in France on 21 December 2007. The channel was replaced by French versions of MTV Hits and BET on 17 November 2015.

== Programming ==
Following the closures of MTV OMG, MTV Rocks and Club MTV on 20 July 2020, MTV Base previously broadcast a weekly chart based on Club MTV programming on Fridays.

=== Former programming ===
- (artist): 2 On
- (artist): Brand New Vid!
- (artist): On Repeat
- #MTVHottest
- 10 Biggest R&B & Rap Anthems RN!
- Big Beats & Future Smashes!
- Black Lives Matter
- Brand New Video!
- Club MTV: Saturday Night Dance Anthems
- Club MTV's Big 20 (weekly dance music chart)
- End of the Road! Farewell from MTV Base!
- Freshest Beats & Bangers
- Happy Birthday (artist)
- Most Played Videos of the Week
- MTV Asks
- Old Skool Night
- Re-rewind Ultimate Garage Anthems
- Super Base Beats

== Logos ==
Logo used from 2001–2007.

Logo used from 2007–2010.

Used from 2010–2011.

Used from 2011–2013.

Used from 2013–2017.

Used from 2017–2021.

Used from 2021–31 March 2022.
