= Nick at Nite international versions =

Set of programming blocks

Nick at Nite’s current logo as of September 19th, 2023 (In the US)

Despite the success of Nick at Nite in the United States, most international versions of Nickelodeon do not carry their own Nick at Nite programming block, as those local versions of Nickelodeon outside of the United States either carry children's programming 24 hours a day or run a non-Nick at Nite program block during the nighttime hours. While Nick at Nite's U.S. flagship primarily focuses on reruns of discontinued primetime network sitcoms, some of these international versions have aired reruns of discontinued Nickelodeon series.

As of 2023, Australia is the only country outside the United States to have a Nick at Nite block.

== Latin America ==
Nick at Nite launched on February 13, 2006 in Latin America and Brazil. Until 2012, the network had aired shows such as ALF, Mork & Mindy, The Addams Family, The Munsters, Bewitched, I Dream of Jeannie, Happy Days, The Fresh Prince of Bel-Air, Growing Pains, The Facts of Life, Diff'rent Strokes, Get Smart and Perfect Strangers, which have been broadcast on other Latin American broadcast and cable channels. Although the Latin American Nickelodeon was launched in the mid-1990s, it had never carried the Nick at Nite block before; as of April 2010 the Latin American version had since shifted away from classic and defunct Nickelodeon series, between animated series and live-action comedies such as Zoey 101, Ned's Declassified School Survival Guide, True Jackson, VP, Hey Arnold!, Rocko's Modern Life and Rocket Power. The block was abruptly ended on January 1, 2015 after almost 9 years.

== Australia and New Zealand ==
In Australia and New Zealand, Nick at Nite aired from October 23, 1995 until July/August 2000. It shared the same channel as Nickelodeon broadcasting from 8pm until 6am on weeknights and 10pm until 6am on weekends. Shows included Get Smart, Sanford and Son, The Courtship of Eddie's Father, The Fugitive, Bonanza, The Prisoner, The Saint, Thunderbirds, Stingray, Captain Scarlet and the Mysterons, Joe 90, The Mary Tyler Moore Show, The Flying Nun, Gilligan's Island, Mister Ed, and The Bob Newhart Show.

On 22 June 2023, it was announced that 10 Shake would rebrand as Nickelodeon on August 1. With this relaunch, a Nick at Nite block was announced, marking it the first time in 23 years since the block's removal from the Australian feed.

== Europe ==
=== UK and Ireland ===
Nick at Nite’s UK and Ireland feed was one of the planned, and advertised, stations as part of Sky's new Multichannels package with intent of launching in 1994, but it never did. However, it was announced in June 2016 that a UK version of Nick at Nite would finally launch on Nickelodeon UK on June 27, 2016, running from 7pm to midnight/12am. Shows that were put in this slot include iCarly, Victorious, Sam & Cat and Drake & Josh. In 2019, the Nick at Nite branding was wiped off, so the night-time programming on the channel once again runs under the main Nickelodeon branding.

=== Germany, Austria and Switzerland ===
In Germany, Nick nach Acht was a programming block aired on Nickelodeon Germany after 8:15 p.m. CET starting on January 1, 2008. It aired documentaries, drama series, movies and sitcoms. The block used an adapted version of the then-current logo of its American counterpart. Many parts of the block included reruns of Ren and Stimpy and CatDog. These shows were only available on Nick Germany's website, though. Starting on December 15, 2008, Nickelodeon and Comedy Central shared the same channel space; Comedy Central aired after 8:15 p.m., effectively replacing Nick nach Acht.

In July 2014, it was announced Nickelodeon would become a 24-hour-channel once again. The overnight schedule would be branded as "NickNight", a block which launched on October 1, 2014. The block ran from 9:00pm to 5:45am CET and featured classic Nickelodeon programming (such as Victorious and CatDog) along with a selection of series from MTV and other programming for a teenage audience. In preparation for the move, Comedy Central moved to the channel space of VIVA in September 2014, where it initially broadcast from 5pm to 6am; this changed in October 2015 so that Comedy Central now ran on VIVA's space from 2pm to 2am. (Since the closure of VIVA on December 31, 2018, Comedy Central now occupies that channel space 24 hours a day.) Nicknight was replaced by MTV+, a one-hour timeshift of MTV, on November 1, 2018. MTV+ broadcasts between 8:15pm and 5:00am. Later on March 1, 2021 MTV+ was canceled for the new one-hour timeshift of Comedy Central. Comedy Central +1 runs from 8:15pm to 1:00am. At 1:00am starts Nick Germany.

=== Netherlands ===
In the Netherlands, Nick@Nite aired on Nickelodeon from mid 2004 to early 2005, as Nickelodeon got access to airing 24 hours a day. It mostly aired Nickelodeon programmes with their original language (as they would be aired in Dutch during the day), but at midnight they would often show vintage children's programmes such as Bassie en Adriaan, De Bereboot and Calimero. The animated series Argaï was only aired during these hours on the channel.

Nick@Nite ran for the lifespan of their 24/7 channel. Its run in the Netherlands ended in 2005, when Nickelodeon began having to share its channel space with Talpa (later Tien, now RTL 8). As a result, they decided to move to the channel occupied by The Box, first sharing with The Box and later sharing it with the Dutch version of Comedy Central. Nickelodeon became a 24-hour service again on February 14, 2011, and on that day, TeenNick premiered on the channel, which resembled the original Nick at Nite form as used between 2004 and 2005. TeenNick was replaced by a Dutch version of Spike on October 1, 2015. (Spike has since moved to its own 24-hour channel space on some major Dutch pay-TV platforms, expanded back Nick to a 24-hour channel on those providers; on others, and in Belgium, Nick and Spike remained timeshare nightly between 9:05pm and 5:00am CET.)

=== Spain ===
In Spain, Nick at Nite aired around 2009 branded as Noches Nick. It aired shows such as iCarly and Drake & Josh

== Asia ==
=== Russia and the CIS ===
In Russia & the CIS countries, Nick At Nite aired on Nickelodeon (CIS) everyday from 9:30pm until 11:30pm Moscow Time. Shows included Drake & Josh, iCarly, Unfabulous, The Elephant Princess, Doctor Who, Russian News with Leslie Bricusse, True Jackson, VP.

=== Japan ===
In Japan, Nick at Nite aired weeknights from 9:00pm until 6:00am. The block premiered on August 4, 2008 and ceased on September 30, 2009 when Nick Japan went defunct. Shows included The Addams Family, Charles In Charge, Gilligan's Island, Bewitched, The Lucy Show, The Brady Bunch, The Dick Van Dyke Show and Sanford and Son.

=== India and Bangladesh ===
The block was started in 2008 branded as Nick at Nite Family Time. Airing from 8pm to 11pm, it consisted of Drake and Josh, Ninja Hattori, Perman and SpongeBob SquarePants.
