= Club MTV (UK and Ireland) =

British and Irish television channel

- Country: United Kingdom
- Broadcast area: United Kingdom and Ireland
- Network: MTV

Programming
- Language: English
- Picture format: 1080i HDTV (downscaled to 16:9 576i for the SDTV feed)

Ownership
- Owner: Paramount Networks UK & Australia
- Sister channels: MTV; MTV 90s; MTV 80s; MTV Live; MTV Music

History
- Launched: 20 April 2001; 25 years ago (original); 14 April 2025; 15 months ago (relaunch)
- Replaced: MTV Hits (relaunch)
- Closed: 20 July 2020; 6 years ago (original); 31 December 2025; 7 months ago (relaunch)
- Former names: MTV Dance (2001–2018)

Links
- Website: (at time of closure) mtv.co.uk/club-mtv

Club MTV was a British electronic dance music channel operated by ViacomCBS Networks UK & Australia launched on 20 April 2001 as MTV Dance. The channel played dance, trance, clubhouse, electronica, drum and bass, rap, R&B, hip-hop, techno and house music.

The channel closed on 20 July 2020 but was relaunched 5 years later on 14 April 2025, replacing MTV Hits. It closed again on 31 December 2025.

== Concept and expansion ==
In May 2000, MTV Extra was reformatted to focus on pop and dance music, with an MTV Dance sub-channel airing in its space during the evening hours.

Following the strand's immense success, on 30 March 2001, MTV Networks Europe announced that MTV Dance would be spun off as a standalone network on 20 April, which would allow MTV Extra to exclusively focus on pop music and be renamed as MTV Hits. The channel officially launched as planned on 20 April, airing from 7:00 pm until 6:00 am, timesharing with Nick Jr.

On 13 August 2002, MTV Dance gained its own 24-hour transponder slot on all platforms.

MTV Dance began broadcasting in widescreen on 6 March 2012.

=== Expansion around Europe ===
On 7 March 2008, MTV Dance increased its presence around Europe, when MTV Networks Europe replaced the Europe-wide feed of MTV Base with a similar feed of MTV Dance.

From 10 January 2011 a feed of the MTV Dance channel launched in Italy on Sky Italia, replacing MTV Pulse. In 2014, MTV Dance, as well as MTV Rocks and MTV Hits started broadcasting European versions, without commercials or teleshopping. MTV Dance Europe was rebranded as Club MTV in June 2020.

=== Expansion into Australia ===
VIMN launched the channel in Australia on 3 December 2013 as MTV Dance Australia, it shows the same programmes from the UK version, then rebranded as Club MTV in 2020.

=== Closure ===
This channel, along with its sister channels MTV OMG and MTV Rocks closed on 20 July 2020, with a chart based on the channel's former content airing on MTV Base. "High on Life" by Martin Garrix featuring Bonn was the last music video played on the channel.

MTV Dance Europe was later rebranded as the European version of Club MTV in June 2020, as was the Australian version a month later.

=== Relaunch and second closure ===
Club MTV was relaunched in the UK, on 14 April 2025, replacing MTV Hits. The channel ceased broadcasting again on 31 December 2025. Its second final song broadcast was "Don't Stop the Music" by Rihanna, followed by a loop of the Club MTV logo rotating and changing colour every time it rotated with music in the background and text scrolling by at the bottom saying "Club MTV is now closed. Continue watching over at MTV."
