= MTV Hits (United Kingdom and Ireland) =

British television channel

- Country: United Kingdom
- Broadcast area: United Kingdom, Ireland
- Network: MTV UK
- Headquarters: London

Programming
- Language: English
- Picture format: 1080i HDTV (downscaled to 576i for the SDTV feed)

Ownership
- Owner: Paramount Networks UK & Australia
- Sister channels: MTV; MTV 80s MTV 90s MTV Music; MTV Live

History
- Launched: 1 May 2001; 25 years ago
- Replaced: MTV Extra
- Closed: 14 April 2025; 17 months ago
- Replaced by: Club MTV

Links
- Website: mtv.co.uk/mtv-hits

MTV Hits was a British pay television pop music channel owned by Paramount Networks UK & Australia. The channel launched in 2001 replacing MTV Extra. Launching at the same time as MTV Dance, MTV Hits played music videos of recent chart hits.

The domestic feed was merged into the pan-European feed of MTV Hits on 1 August 2024, continuing to originate domestic advertising and teleshopping slots.

The channel closed on 14 April 2025 and was replaced by Club MTV.

== See also ==
- MTV (UK & Ireland)
