= 2018 in British television =

This is a list of events that took place in 2018 relating to television in the United Kingdom.

== Events ==
=== January ===
Date	Event
1	BBC One welcomes 2018 with a concert by Nile Rodgers and Chic, celebrating their 40th anniversary. The programme pauses at midnight for the Chimes of Big Ben and fireworks display.
1	New Year's Day highlights on BBC One include the TV adaptation of David Walliams' children's story Grandpa's Great Escape, and the debut episode of the BBC crime series McMafia.
1	ITV airs the network television premiere of the James Bond film Spectre. The film is aired by ITV again on 6 January.
1	The US sitcom Friends becomes available to Netflix viewers in the UK and Ireland as the web television provider makes all ten series available for streaming to its customers.
2	PBS in the United States begins simulcasting the BBC News programmes Beyond 100 Days and World News Today.
2	Channel 5 launches the twenty-first series of Celebrity Big Brother with a female-only cast to mark the 100th anniversary of women over 30 being given the vote. The first male contestants will appear on the programme from 5 January.
3	Royal Mail announces plans to release a set of stamps featuring characters from Game of Thrones, which will be available from 23 January.
3	ITV News at Ten is forced off the air as the studio is evacuated due to a fire alarm.
4	Figures indicate that The Great Christmas Bake Off, aired on Christmas Day 2017, was watched by an audience of 4.8 million, giving Channel 4 their largest Christmas Day viewership since modern records began in 2002.
4	Debut of Derry Girls, a new six-part comedy from Channel 4 set in Derry, Northern Ireland. The broadcaster issued a "Derry glossary" ahead of the start of the series in order to help viewers understand some of the lingo used by the characters.
5	Stephen Fry says he will step down as presenter of the BAFTA Film Awards.
5	The BBC announce they have dropped Ed Westwick from the cast of their adaptation of Agatha Christie's Ordeal by Innocence following a number of sexual assault allegations made against him.
5	A team of former students of Keble College, Oxford win the 2017–18 series of Christmas University Challenge, while their opponents from the University of Reading become the first team in the history of the programme to score nothing. The final score is 240–0.
6	Eamonn Holmes and Ruth Langsford will present a weekly chat show for Channel 5, it is reported. The programme, scheduled to begin later in the year, has been provisionally titled What a Week with Eamonn & Ruth.
7	Carrie Gracie resigns from her post as BBC News's China editor over the BBC's gender pay gap controversy, and accuses the BBC of a "secretive and illegal" pay culture.
7	Dancing on Ice returns to ITV for a tenth series, and following a four-year hiatus. Phillip Schofield returns to present alongside Holly Willoughby.
8	Matt Hancock is appointed Secretary of State for Culture, Media and Sport in a Cabinet reshuffle, replacing Karen Bradley.
8	Riccardo Acerbi, a 56-year-old actor from the Lazio region of Italy is introduced by frozen food manufacturer Birds Eye as the latest actor to play Captain Birdseye.
9	Culture Secretary Matt Hancock urges the BBC to respond to allegations of pay inequality. His comments come on the same day that the Equality and Human Rights Commission signals its intention to write to the BBC over the gender pay gap controversy and after the resignation of Carrie Gracie.
9	Joanna Lumley is confirmed as presenter of the 2018 BAFTA Film Awards, replacing Stephen Fry.
10	Figures indicate that the opening episode of Blue Planet II had the highest viewing audience of 2017, with 14 million tuning in to BBC One to watch the programme.
10	A man whose bigamous marriage was discovered after his first wife saw him on a March 2016 edition of Ant & Dec's Saturday Night Takeaway with another woman is jailed for six months by magistrates in Warrington, Cheshire.
10	Debut of the four-part drama serial Kiri on Channel 4. The opening episode is well received by television critics, but attracts criticism from some social workers because of what they perceive as the programme's negative portrayal of their profession.
14	BBC One airs The Coronation, a documentary in which Queen Elizabeth II gives a rare insight into her personal experience of her coronation.
15	Anthony McPartlin announces that he will be divorcing from his wife Lisa Armstrong after being married for 11 years.
15	Ski Sunday Celebrates 40 years of TV's skiing coverage.
17	Sunrise begins broadcasting from Studio 6 at Sky Studios. The new studio includes a virtual space to allow for segments away from the desk area, along with the weather.
22	Following the announcement of their engagement, Princess Eugenie and her fiancé Jack Brooksbank give their first interview to BBC One's The One Show.
23	Fox's £11.7bn bid to take full control of Sky is provisionally blocked by the Competition and Markets Authority (CMA) amid concerns of plurality.
23	The BBC confirms that Aled Jones will return to his presenting roles on BBC One's Songs of Praise and BBC Radio Wales after he was suspended in October 2017.
26	Six of the BBC's leading male presenters—Huw Edwards, Nicky Campbell, John Humphrys, Jon Sopel, Nick Robinson and Jeremy Vine—have agreed to take pay cuts following the recent controversy over equal salaries at the broadcaster.
26	The BBC announces plans for a classical music season, which will include Our Classical Century, a BBC Four series featuring major classical performances of the past one hundred years.
27	The day's edition of Blind Date features the game show's first gay contestant, a former Mr Gay UK, choosing from three other men with whom to go on a date.
28	At 10.00 pm ITV airs President Trump – The Piers Morgan Interview, an interview Piers Morgan recorded with Donald Trump at the 2018 meeting of the World Economic Forum in Davos, Switzerland. During the programme, Trump tells Morgan that he "wouldn't call himself" a feminist, and would take a different approach to Brexit than that of British Prime Minister Theresa May.
29	Reality television star June Bernicoff announces she will not be returning to Channel 4's Gogglebox following the death late last year of her husband Leon.
30	A report prepared by the auditors PwC finds there is "no evidence of gender bias regarding pay decisions at the BBC, prompting a raft of angry criticism from women employed by the broadcaster.
30	Professional dancer Brendan Cole announces he is leaving Strictly Come Dancing after being with the series since its outset. Cole says that the decision over his departure was made by the BBC and not himself.
31	While giving evidence to the House of Commons digital, culture, media and sport select committee, former BBC China editor Carrie Gracie says the BBC cannot be trusted on equal pay, and accuses BBC management of lying to and briefing against her.
31	Coronation Street actor Antony Cotton suffers two broken ribs while rehearsing for Dancing on Ice with dance partner Brandee Malto. He subsequently states his intention to continue participating in the series.

=== February ===
Date	Event
1	Blue Peter celebrates its 5000th episode, launching a new Diamond Badge to mark the occasion.
2	Drag queen Courtney Act wins series 21 of Celebrity Big Brother.
6	BBC Weather launches with a new look during the BBC News at One, with data now provided by MeteoGroup.
7	Mel Giedroyc and Måns Zelmerlöw present the 2018 edition of Eurovision: You Decide on BBC Two, where SuRie, a graduate of the Royal Academy of Music, is chosen to represent the United Kingdom at the Eurovision Song Contest.
7	Media reports suggest the revived series of The Generation Game will be shorter than originally envisaged, with two rather than four episodes. The programme is being presented by Mel Giedroyc and Sue Perkins.
8	Channel 4 announces a celebrity Stand Up to Cancer edition of The Great British Bake Off.
9	BBC One broadcasts the opening ceremony of the 2018 Winter Olympics from Pyeongchang, South Korea.
12	21st Century Fox pledges to maintain the independence of Sky News for five years if it is given the go-ahead for its £11.7million takeover of the news channel. However, Fox wouldn't guarantee funding for the service beyond the five-year period.
12	Comedian Steve Coogan is set to return as his alter-ego Alan Partridge as filming begins on a new BBC series featuring the character, This Time with Alan Partridge.
14	BT and Sky have agreed a £4.4bn three-year deal to show live Premiership football matches from 2019 to 2022, but the amount falls short of the £5.1bn deal struck in 2015.
15	BBC News Online reports that BBC One is planning a new Saturday evening talent show titled The Greatest Dancer, and that will see the singer Cheryl acting as a mentor to contestants. A pilot filmed a few days earlier, but not scheduled for broadcast, features Alesha Dixon and Jordan Banjo as presenters, but it is thought unlikely they would present the series.
16	A HM Revenue and Customs (HMRC) tax tribunal rules against former BBC Look North presenter Christa Ackroyd, who has been engaged in a long-running legal battle with HMRC over the nature of her employment contract with the BBC. She is one of a number of BBC presenters employed through contracts with personal service companies, and faces a £420,000 tax bill after losing the case.
18	Joanna Lumley presents the 2018 BAFTA Film Awards, having taken over the role from Stephen Fry. Jennifer Lawrence's curt dismissal of Lumley's gushing introduction that precedes Lawrence presenting an award provokes criticism of both actresses on social media, and calls for Fry to return next year.
20	Channel 4 airs the documentary Working with Weinstein in which fresh allegations of inappropriate behaviour are made against the film producer Harvey Weinstein.
21	Jack Whitehall presents the 2018 Brit Awards from The O2, London, and which are broadcast live on ITV.
22	The government confirms that the annual cost of a television licence will rise by £3.50 from £147 to £150.50 on 1 April.
22	The High Court orders Channel 5 to pay a couple £10,000 each in damages for distress caused by the broadcast of footage of them being evicted from their home. The footage was taken for the documentary series Can't Pay? We'll Take It Away!, and was shown as many as thirty five times, but the couple had not given their permission for it to be aired. The court rules that the couple's privacy outweighed Channel 5's freedom of expression.
22	Guests on the day's edition of This Morning include the recently ousted leader of the UK Independence Party Henry Bolton and his girlfriend Jo Marney whose controversial SMS messages about Prince Harry's fiancé Meghan Markle led to Bolton's political downfall.
23	BBC Four broadcasts a special one-off live edition of The Old Grey Whistle Test to mark thirty years since the original series came to an end. The three-hour programme is presented by Bob Harris.
23	Danny Miller, who plays gay character Aaron Dingle in ITV's Emmerdale, criticises Twitter for its response to complaints he made about homophobic tweets he received in relation to the soap.
23	Comedian Stephen Fry reveals that he is recovering from surgery for prostate cancer, having been undergone the operation in January.
23	Brighton hairdresser and Gogglebox star Chris Butland-Steed announces he is leaving the series to pursue a career in television.
24	Take Me Out celebrates its 100th episode with an anniversary special.
24	Ant & Dec's Saturday Night Takeaway returns for its fifteenth series. But viewers start to spark concern over Ant McPartlin looking a bit red faced.
26	Former Emmerdale actress Roxanne Pallett joins York's Minster FM to present the breakfast programme alongside Ben Fry.
26	BBC One airs The Vicar of Dibley episode "Love and Marriage" in tribute to the actress Emma Chambers who played Alice Tinker, and who died on 21 February.
27	US cable TV giant Comcast makes a £22.1bn bid for Sky, challenging the existing offer from 21st Century Fox.
28	A new feed of ITV3 is launched on Freeview, on Channel 788.

=== March ===
Date	Event
3	Michael Rice wins the first series of BBC One programme All Together Now.
3	ITV airs the 100th episode of Ant & Dec's Saturday Night Takeaway.
4	BBC One airs the episode of Call the Midwife in which Nurse Barbara Hereward (played by Charlotte Ritchie) is killed off alongside her on-screen husband Tom Hereward (Jack Ashton) and her best friend Phyllis (Linda Bassett). Ritchie's departure from the series is not announced prior to the episode's broadcast.
6	Former BBC Breakfast presenter Bill Turnbull tells the Radio Times he has been diagnosed with prostate cancer and says he is speaking out in order to raise awareness of the disease.
6	Coronation Street is to tackle the subject of male rape in a storyline involving the character David Platt (played by Jack P. Shepherd) who becomes a victim of the crime after being drugged and raped by a friend.
6	Broadcaster Iain Lee storms off an edition of Channel 5's The Wright Stuff following an on air argument with presenter Matthew Wright.
8	Good Morning Britain presenter Piers Morgan announces he has signed a new two-year contract to continue presenting the programme.
9	ITV confirms that Jeremy Clarkson will present a new series of Who Wants to Be a Millionaire?, which is returning for a week to celebrate its 20th anniversary.
11	In the wake of the poisoning of Sergei and Yulia Skripal in which the involvement of Russian intelligence is suspected, John McDonnell, the Shadow Chancellor, says he will be making no more appearances on the Russian state sponsored television channel Russia Today, declaring that its coverage "goes beyond objective journalism" and saying that it is "right" that Labour MPs do not appear on it.
11	The live final of Crufts is interrupted by a protester from Peta (People for the Ethical Treatment of Animals) who invades the stage as the Best in Show winner is being announced.
11	Jake Quickenden and dance partner Vanessa Bauer win series 10 of Dancing on Ice.
12	A bench paying tribute to the victims of the Manchester Arena bombing is unveiled as part of a new expansion of the Coronation Street Victoria Street sets which includes a prescient with facades of a Greater Manchester Police called Weatherfield Police station, a Tram stop station which is part of a product placement deal with Manchester Metrolink and shop fronts facades of Costa Coffee and the Co-op will appear onscreen from 20 April 2018.
13	Debut of The Ruth Ellis Files: A Very British Crime Story, a three-part documentary series in which film-maker Gillian Pachter re-examines the Ruth Ellis case.
15	BBC One confirms it will screen the Oscar-winning film The Silent Child on Good Friday (30 March).
15	BBC Two's Newsnight airs an item about Labour Party leader Jeremy Corbyn's response to the Salisbury poisoning showing a graphic of Corbyn next to images of Moscow as a backdrop. The item leads to criticism from newspaper columnist Owen Jones and others that the image was photoshopped in an attempt to make Corbyn look like a Soviet stooge, allegations subsequently rejected by the BBC.
17	BBC Two announces it will axe Robot Wars for the second time due to a lack of making new action toys until Hexbug reintroduced production rather late, the series having been revived in 2016.
18	Television presenter Ant McPartlin is arrested for drink driving after a car crash in London.
19	Channel 4 airs a documentary about Cambridge Analytica, the data analysis company that worked on the Leave.EU campaign for the EU referendum, and for Donald Trump's 2016 presidential campaign. Undercover reporters, talking to executives from the firm, discover the use of bribes, honey traps, fake news campaigns and operations with ex-spies to swing election campaigns around the world. An emergency court order is requested to raid the Cambridge Analytica offices.
19	Ant McPartlin has stepped down from his presenting roles while he seeks further treatment following his arrest for drink driving. ITV also announces that the 24 March edition of Ant & Dec's Saturday Night Takeaway will not be aired, while McPartlin will have no involvement in the remaining two episodes of the series (due to air on 31 March and 7 April). On 21 March it is confirmed that Declan Donnelly will present the shows on his own.
21	The Metropolitan Police confirm that Ant McPartlin has been charged with drink driving.
23	The actress and campaigner Brooke Kinsella, whose brother Ben Kinsella was a victim of knife crime, praises EastEnders for a planned storyline involving the issue. Kinsella, who played the character Kelly Taylor for three years in the early 2000s, and who established the Ben Kinsella Trust following her brother's death, was consulted for the plot, and has worked with scriptwriters to make the story as authentic as possible. The storyline will see Shakil Kazemi (played by Shaheen Jafargholi) and Keegan Baker (played by Zack Morris) attacked, and follow the consequences and repercussions of the attack.
23	BBC One airs Sport Relief 2018. For this year Sport Relief has decided not to show appeal films featuring celebrities visiting developing countries, following complaints they are akin to "poverty tourism". By the end of its broadcast the event has raised £38,195,278 for charitable causes.
23	Suzuki axes its TV advertising campaign featuring Ant and Dec after drink driving charges are brought against Ant McPartlin.
23	ITV have applied to allow weekend tours of the Coronation Street set in Stretford, following the success of the temporary tour at the programme's former set in 2014 and 2015.
27	The BBC unveils plans to stage an outdoor festival for children in August. The CBBC Summer Social, the BBC's first such festival, will take place at Croxteth Hall, Liverpool on the weekend of 3–5 August, and will include performances from Union J, HRVY, Mackenzie Ziegler and Matt Terry.
27	ITV announces that Ant McPartlin will be featured in the final two episodes of Saturday Night Takeaway but within pre-recorded whodunnit sketch, Saturday Knight Takeaway.
29	BBC One confirms that the final two episodes of Peter Kay's Car Share will be broadcast in May.
29	The UK Government announces that it will continue providing £6.72m of funding for S4C until 2020, with the aim of S4C being funded wholly from the licence fee from 2022. This will see S4C's funding being decided as part of the licence fee settlement, for 10-year periods.
31	Declan Donnelly presents his first solo edition of Saturday Night Takeaway; overnight viewing figures indicate it to have had an audience of 7.7 million viewers with a 39% share of the overall viewership.

=== April ===
Date	Event
1	BBC One airs the first of two editions of the latest version of The Generation Game, which is presented by Mel and Sue.
1	50th anniversary of the first edition of the BBC's Reporting Scotland.
3	After Have I Got News for You team captain Ian Hislop says that women politicians are "more reticent" to guest host the programme, MP Nadine Dorries, who has previously appeared as a panelist, describes the programme as being "too vicious" for most female guests. She also says the programme does not "lend itself to women feeling comfortable", and that she has turned down a number of requests to appear on it.
5	The BBC admits that a scene from its 2011 series Human Planet purporting to show Korowai tribe from West Papua was not accurate.
7	Ruti Olajugbagbe wins the seventh series of The Voice UK.
7	The final episode in the current series of Ant & Dec's Saturday Night Takeaway sees Declan Donnelly present the programme from Universal Orlando Resort in Florida. The episode is seen by fewer viewers than Donnelly's first solo edition, with an average 6.9 million tuning in, down by almost one million on the previous week.
13	Kenny Tutt wins the 2018 series of MasterChef.
14	The National Lottery results are broadcast on ITV for the first time after more than two decades on the BBC, with the results appearing as a 90-second summary as part of an ad break during Britain's Got Talent.
21	BBC One airs The Queen's Birthday Party, a concert from London's Royal Albert Hall celebrating the 92nd birthday of Queen Elizabeth II.
23	St John's College, Cambridge wins the 2017–18 series of University Challenge, beating Merton College, Oxford 145–100.
26	Channel 5 announce plans to give the Chuckle Brothers their own Saturday morning show, Chuckle Time, almost a decade after their show, ChuckleVision was last aired by CBBC.
27	The BBC withdraws the 2011 series Human Planet from distribution because of a second editorial breach, involving a scene depicting a hunter harpooning a whale, which the BBC feels is not accurate.
27	Sky Sports presenter Simon Thomas, whose wife died suddenly from cancer in late 2017, says he is leaving the broadcaster to focus on his son.
30	Series 13 of Only Connect is won by the Escapologists.

=== May ===
Date	Event
1	Matthew Wright announces he is leaving Channel 5's The Wright Stuff after eighteen years as its presenter.
1	Coronation Street bosses announce plans for a storyline tackling male suicide involving the character Aidan Connor (who is played by Shayne Ward).
1	Music channel VH1 takes on a general entertainment focus, matching the American network, though due to the American VH1's programmes being licensed to other networks or broadcasters, it carries content from Channel 5 and MTV. This change co-insides with a move from Sky's music channel section of its programme guide to its entertainment section.
3	An original script from the first episode of Doctor Who, 1963's "Doctor Who and the Tribe of Gum", sells at auction for £6,200.
3	Public tours of the new Coronation Street set will begin later in May after plans to host tours at the site were approved by Trafford Council.
4	Dermot O'Leary and Scarlett Moffatt are announced as presenters who will lead the BBC's respective television and radio coverage of the wedding of Prince Harry and Meghan Markle, O'Leary fronting coverage for BBC One and Moffatt providing coverage for Radio 1.
4	Steven Knight, creator of Peaky Blinders, revealed plans for a ballet version of the BBC Two series.
6	The BBC announces that Andrew Marr is to undergo surgery to remove a kidney tumour, and will be absent from the airwaves while he recovers.
10	It is reported that Barbara Windsor was diagnosed with Alzheimer's disease in April 2014; her husband says that her condition has begun to deteriorate.
10	Episodes of Coronation Street will be synchronised for viewers in New Zealand from 11 June. Up to now New Zealand has been eighteen months behind the United Kingdom. A two-hour special will be aired to recap storylines over the time period to facilitate the catch-up.
12	Netta, representing Israel, wins the 2018 Eurovision Song Contest in Lisbon, Portugal, with the song "Toy". SuRie, representing the United Kingdom, comes 24th out of 26 with her song "Storm". After her performance is interrupted by a stage invasion she is given the chance to perform the song again, but declines the offer. An investigation into the incident is launched by the European Broadcasting Union, while a suspect is arrested by Portuguese Police.
19	The wedding of Prince Harry and Meghan Markle is held at St George's Chapel, Windsor, with an estimated global audience of 1.9 billion. In the UK the event is broadcast by the BBC, ITV and Sky News. It is subsequently confirmed as the UK's biggest television event of the year so far, with 18 million viewers tuning into watch proceedings. This audience includes 13.1 million who watched BBC One's coverage and 3.6 million who tuned in to watch the wedding on ITV.
23	Hollywood actor Richard Gere will star in MotherFatherSon, a BBC Two series about a media tycoon, making his first television appearance in three decades.
25	Kirsty Gallacher announces that she is to leave Sky Sports after 20 years.
26	After 25 years, ITV airs a UEFA Champions League match for the final time when it airs highlights of the final between Real Madrid and Liverpool.
28	BBC Two airs a new adaptation of King Lear set in a future present, and starring Anthony Hopkins in the eponymous role, as well as Emma Thompson, Emily Watson and Florence Pugh as Lear's daughters.
28	The semi-final of series 12 of Britain's Got Talent is forced off air for fifteen minutes as a result of a technical glitch caused by adverse weather conditions.
31	Matt LeBlanc announces he will leave Top Gear after the end of the next series.

=== June ===
Date	Event
1	The music channel Channel AKA announces its closure; and being replaced by Massive R&B.
3	Comedian Lee Ridley, also known as Lost Voice Guy wins series 12 of Britain's Got Talent.
4	ITV2 launches series four of Love Island, with the opening edition giving the channel almost three million viewers, its highest ever audience and a figure that beats all other programmes being aired in the same timeslot.
5	Secretary of State for Culture, Media and Sport Matt Hancock gives the green light to 21st Century Fox's plans to take full control of Sky plc, but on the condition it divests itself of Sky News.
7	Louis Walsh announces he is leaving his role as a judge on The X Factor after thirteen years with the show.
8	It is announced that Home, a comedy written by Rufus Jones and about a Syrian refugee who enters the UK as an illegal immigrant, will air on Channel 4.
9	Those from the world of film and television to receive recognition in the 2018 Birthday Honours include Emma Thompson and Mary Beard, who both become Dames, Tom Hardy, who becomes a CBE, and Keira Knightley, who is awarded an OBE.
11	BBC Radio 2 broadcaster Jeremy Vine will succeed Matthew Wright as presenter of Channel 5's daily current affairs programme from September. The show, presently titled The Wright Stuff will be renamed and relaunched once Vine takes on the presenting role.
11	Episodes of Coronation Street are synchronised for viewers in New Zealand.
12	ITV confirms that Love Island contestant Niall Aslam has left the series for personal reasons.
14	Matthew Wright presents his last edition of The Wright Stuff after 18 years.
14	The BBC and ITV begin airing coverage of the 2018 FIFA World Cup, held in Russia, with ITV screening the opening ceremony and inaugural match. The opening ceremony features a performance by Robbie Williams, while the first match, Russia vs Saudi Arabia, results in a 5–0 win for Russia.
17	The BBC announces that David Dimbleby will leave Question Time at the end of the year after 25 years as its presenter. His final edition of the programme will be on 13 December.
18	UKTV confirms it will begin rerunning episodes of EastEnders on the Drama channel from early August, starting with the first episode from February 1985.
21	Following the death of former Love Island contestant Sophie Gradon, ITV2 airs a short tribute to her before the evening's edition of the reality show.
26	Royal Mail releases a set of commemorative stamps marking the fiftieth anniversary of Dad's Army.

=== July ===
Date	Event
1	The BBC confirms that Jeremy Vine will leave his role as presenter of Points of View after fronting the programme for ten years.
2	After footage of series 11 of Doctor Who appeared on the California-based website Tapatalk, the BBC has asked the state's Federal Court to compel Tapatalk to disclose records that could identify the source of the leak.
3	Ofcom have received 2,525 complaints from viewers about the 1 July edition of Love Island in which a contestant was shown a misleading video about her boyfriend. The watchdog says it will assess the material against the broadcasting code before deciding whether or not to launch an investigation. Ofcom subsequently finds that the footage was not in breach of its regulations and on 16 July says that it will not be launching an investigation.
3	ITV airs the 2018 FIFA World Cup knockout stage match between England and Colombia, which results in a 1–1 draw and sees England beat Colombia 4–3 on penalties, giving them a place in the quarter-finals. Overnight viewing figures indicate the match's climax was watched by 23.6 million viewers, making it the most watched television event since the 2012 London Olympics.
5	Carol McGiffin returns to Loose Women after a break of five years.
6	BBC One airs a special episode of EastEnders featuring the funeral of knife crime victim Shakil Kazemi (played by Shaheen Jafargholi) in which real-life knife crime stories are also included, with parents of victims speaking about their loved ones.
6	Benidorm creator Derren Litten confirms the tenth series that aired in 2018 will be the last.
7	BBC One airs the World Cup quarter-final match between England and Sweden that results in a 2–0 win for England and puts them through to the first World Cup semi-final since 1990. Overnight figures indicate the match is seen by an average audience of 15.8 million viewers, rising to 19.9 million by the end of the game.
7	BBC News reports that Channel 4 is expected to sign a five-year deal to show highlights of Formula One and live coverage of the British Grand Prix until 2024. Sky Sports signed exclusive deal to broadcast live Formula 1 coverage from 2019 to 2024 in 2016.
9	Jeremy Wright is appointed as Secretary of State for Culture, Media and Sport, replacing Matt Hancock.
11	21st Century Fox launches a new £24.5bn bid for Sky, topping one made for £22bn by rival broadcaster Comcast in February.
11	ITV airs the World Cup semi-final match between England and Croatia and sees England exit the competition. Overnight figures indicate the match is seen by an average audience of 24.3 million viewers, rising to 26.5 million by the end of the game. This makes it the highest rated programme on British television since the closing ceremony of the 2012 London Olympics.
12	The BBC announces cut-backs to BBC Parliament. The channel will now close down in the weeks when no UK parliamentary bodies are in session and all programmes made especially for the channel will end.
12	Love Island contestant Samira Mighty becomes the second person to voluntarily leave the 2018 series, doing so because her partner was voted out the previous week.
13	The creators of BBC Scotland's Still Game announce that the sitcom will end after twenty one years, with the next series being the last.
13	Plans are confirmed for a Downton Abbey film that will follow on from the ITV series Downton Abbey, with a script by Julian Fellowes.
15	BBC One shows the first trailer for series 11 of Doctor Who in half-time during the World Cup Final.
17	ITV confirms that Robbie Williams, Ayda Field and Louis Tomlinson will be panelists on series fifteen of The X Factor. They will join Simon Cowell and Sharon Osbourne, though Osbourne will only be present as a judge for the live shows.
18	Louisa Lytton will return to EastEnders as Ruby Allen in the autumn, having last appeared in November 2006.
18	Following a hearing at the High Court, Sir Cliff Richard wins his privacy case over BBC News coverage of a police raid on his home. Mr Justice Mann awards him £210,000 in damages, stating that the BBC had infringed his privacy in a "serious and sensationalist way".
18	Former Emmerdale actress and Minster FM breakfast programme presenter Roxanne Pallett is airlifted to hospital after being involved in a car crash while taking part in a stock car race at Hunmanby Raceway in North Yorkshire. She was racing fellow breakfast programme presenter Ben Fry at the time the incident occurred, and crashed into a concrete wall.
19	Comcast abandons its bid to buy 21st Century Fox in order to concentrate on its bid for Sky.
22	The UKTV channels are removed from Virgin Media. The companies had not been able to agree terms to allow the ten channels and their +1 and HD offshoots to continue to be available on the platform.
23	Channel 4 announces that Birmingham, Greater Manchester and Leeds are on the shortlist for the location of its new headquarters.
24	Following a review of children's programming that identified a number of shortfalls, including a lack of programming for older children, Ofcom has urged ITV, Channel 4 and Channel 5 to improve their children's programming.
24	Former BBC sports commentator John Motson will come out of retirement to become a presenter on Talksport, it is reported, beginning his new role in August.
24	ITV confirms that Poppy Lee Friar and Will Tudor will star in a two-hour drama about Jayne Torvill and Christopher Dean's success at the 1984 Winter Olympics.
24	ITV3 has commissioned The Comedy Years, a four-part series that will look at four specific years in comedy history – 1979, 1984, 1998, and 2003. The series, scheduled to air in 2019, will feature archive footage, pop culture and explore the social history of the years.
25	Leonard Fenton, who played Doctor Legg in EastEnders from 1985 to 1997, will reprise the role in the autumn for a storyline involving Dot Cotton (June Brown).
26	Newsnight apologises for showing footage of Pakistan cricketer Wasim Akram instead of Imran Khan during an article about the latter's political career.
26	The BBC agrees to pay Sir Cliff Richard £850,000 towards his legal costs after its application to appeal against the ruling of his privacy case was rejected.
29	BT Sport is believed to have lost the broadcasting rights to NBA basketball and UFC ultimate fighting after pulling out of a bidding contest.
30	Ofcom scraps the further rollout of local TV channels amid concerns a number of existing channels have struggled to attract both financial support and viewers. Thirty local channels have been established since 2013, with a further thirteen planned, which Ofcom has now halted.
30	Jack Fincham and Dani Dyer win series four of Love Island. Overnight viewing figures indicate the programme to have had an audience of 3.6 million, beating figures for BBC One, BBC Two and ITV in the same timeslot. The pair subsequently announce plans for marriage in 2019.
31	BBC comedy Dad's Army celebrates its 50th anniversary.
31	Jarvis Cocker and Bez are to appear in a special edition of Bargain Hunt to mark the fourth BBC Music Day in September.

=== August ===
Date	Event
1	Unseen sketches from Monty Python are to go on display at the British Library. The material, which includes storylines that were cut from Monty Python and the Holy Grail and fifty notebooks containing notes for Holy Grail and Monty Python's Life of Brian, will go on display at the library later in the month.
3	Maureen Lipman will join Coronation Street in September to play the role of Evelyn Plummer, the grandmother of Tyrone Dobbs (Alan Halsall).
6	Ofcom rules that a 2016 edition of the BBC's Panorama programme investigating allegations of abuse at a secure training unit broke anonymity rules by naming a teenage boy during the film. Although given a pseudonym, the name of the boy, whose identity was meant to be kept anonymous, was heard during the film. The BBC argued it was a "genuine error", but Ofcom ruled the mistake had happened because programme makers had "failed to check and review its content sufficiently".
6	The BBC confirms that Strictly Come Dancing has "no plans" to include same-sex couples in the forthcoming series.
7	Data collected for the Office for National Statistics' annual Internet Access and Use report indicates an increase in the use of commercial video streaming services, with almost half of adults having streamed content via a service such as Netflix or Amazon Video.
9	Ant & Dec announce that they have postponed the next series of their Saturday Night Takeaway, which will now return in 2020 instead of 2019.
11	The 10 UKTV channels return to Virgin Media. The long-term deal sees the HD versions of Dave and Gold launch on the platform.
11	Charlotte Salt makes her final appearance in Casualty as her character Sam Nicholls dies.
14	BBC Two airs one-off edition of the 1990s comedy sketch show Goodness Gracious Me featuring new material, and old and new characters.
15	The BBC announces that it will not appeal against the ruling over its news coverage of a raid on Cliff Richard's house in 2014.
17	Ewan McGregor reads Patricia Hegarty's Everybody's Welcome for CBeebies, becoming the latest celebrity to read a story for the channel.
21	Ofcom says it has received 1,048 complaints about the use of the word "nigger" by a contestant on the twenty-second series of Celebrity Big Brother. The incident occurred during a conversation between Rodrigo Alves and another contestant, and was shown on the second day of the series. Alves is removed from the Big Brother house on 25 August following a second incident.
21	Head of the London Fire Brigade Commissioner Dany Cotton criticises Love Island for reinforcing what she describes as "offensive" stereotypes that discourage young women from joining the service. Her comments refer to a "fireman challenge" that required male contestants to strip to their underwear and pretend to save a drowning woman.
23	A rant about Brexit by EastEnders actor Danny Dyer on an edition of Good Evening Britain is named TV moment of the year at the Edinburgh Television Festival Awards.
23	At the Edinburgh Television Festival ITV boss Kevin Lygo confirms that Declan Donnelly will have a new partner for series eighteen of I'm a Celebrity...Get Me Out of Here! as Ant McPartlin continues to take time away from presenting.
28	Peter Gwyn, the executive producer of University Challenge says the programme will focus on posing "gender neutral" questions after a viewer complained questions are skewed towards men.
28	BBC Two confirms that Autumnwatch will air a week of programmes from New England in October to celebrate the US region's colourful autumn.
29	Holly Willoughby is confirmed as co-presenter of this year's I'm a Celebrity...Get Me Out of Here! alongside Declan Donnelly.
29	Gemma Collins stars in her own reality television special, Gemma Collins: Diva España. The series is later expanded into a franchise following its success.
30	Ofcom says it has received over 3,000 complaints about the previous day's edition of Loose Women during which Kim Woodburn walked off the programme in tears following a row with Coleen Nolan. The pair had previously clashed as contestants on Celebrity Big Brother in 2017, and Woodburn had been invited onto the programme in hopes of a reconciliation with Nolan. By the following day the number of complaints has doubled to 7,000, with Nolan expressing regret for what happened, calling the incident "ugly, upsetting and unpleasant".
31	The BBC confirms plans for Ariana Grande at the BBC, a one-hour special presented by Davina McCall that will see Ariana Grande talking about her life and career and performing some of her hits. The programme will be part of BBC One's autumn schedule.
31	Celebrity Big Brother contestant Ryan Thomas is given a formal warning by bosses on the programme for "punching" fellow housemate Roxanne Pallett after he was seen to approach her and make contact with her using his fist. Ofcom have received more than 11,000 complaints from viewers about the incident.

=== September ===
Date	Event
1	The X Factor returns for its fifteenth series, with a new judging panel. Joining Simon Cowell (the only panelist to return from the previous series) are Louis Tomlinson, Robbie Williams and Williams' wife Ayda Field.
1	Channel 5 confirms that Roxanne Pallett has left Celebrity Big Brother following the "punch" incident with Ryan Thomas.
2	BBC One's The Andrew Marr Show moves to the later timeslot of 10.00am as part of a shake up of the channel's Sunday morning schedule.
3	ITVBe launches its British pre-school programming block LittleBe.
3	British children's TV show, Thomas & Friends, serves its third major franchise reboot, with one half of its 22nd series seeing Thomas travelling across the globe.
5	The BBC confirms that series eleven of Doctor Who will begin on 7 October, the first time it has aired in a Sunday timeslot.
6	As part of its Crime and Punishment season ITV airs Ross Kemp and the Armed Police, a one-off documentary in which Ross Kemp accompanies armed police officers as they deal with the rising problem of inner-city gun violence.
6	Coleen Nolan announces she has cancelled all her work commitments, including appearances on Loose Women "until further notice" following her row with Kim Woodburn on an edition of the programme the previous week.
8	Addressing the annual conference of the Women's Equality Party, co-founder and QI presenter Sandi Toksvig reveals that she earns 40% of the amount paid to her predecessor Stephen Fry.
10	Ryan Thomas wins the twenty-second and final series of Celebrity Big Brother. Celebrity Big Brother would later return to ITV from 2024 onwards with future hosts AJ Odudu and Will Best.
12	Celebrities Go Dating presenter Nadia Essex is fired from the role after trolling on Twitter.
12	Made in Chelsea participant Louise Thompson apologises after breaching Advertising Standards Authority rules when she failed to make it clear that her promotion of a beauty product on social media was advertising.
13	The BBC says it has solved a software issue that causes "streaming lag", whereby live television is delayed by several seconds when viewed online. The issue particularly came to light during coverage of the 2018 FIFA World Cup.
13	BBC Two's Newsnight airs an interview in which Kirsty Wark questions RT's editor Margarita Simonyan after the latter spoke to two Russians suspected of the Salisbury poisoning. Simonyan hangs up on Wark after being asked whether RT is a propaganda tool for the Russian government.
14	ITV confirms that Who Wants to Be a Millionaire? will return for a new series in 2019 with Jeremy Clarkson as presenter.
14	As Big Brother returns for its nineteenth series, Channel 5 announces that the programme will be ending along with Celebrity Big Brother, and that series nineteen will be the final one.
14	BBC Four airs an evening of programmes paying tribute to Amy Winehouse.
14	ITV announces that Maxine Peake will star in Anne, a four-part series about the Hillsborough campaigner Anne Williams.
15	Big Brother contestant Ellis Hillon is removed from the programme following an investigation into an offensive tweet she posted in 2014 on the anniversary of the September 11 attacks, and that contained a racial slur.
15	The Metropolitan Police confirms that TV presenter Mark Lamarr has been charged with common assault and false imprisonment and will appear before magistrates on 1 October. On 1 October the Crown Prosecution Service announces that the case has been discontinued due to insufficient evidence.
18	Addressing the Royal Television Society, BBC Director General Tony Hall says that the rules governing British television need to change if UK television companies are to compete with the likes of Amazon, Netflix and YouTube.
19	The UK government, and major broadcasters including the BBC, ITV and Sky give their backing to a Creative Diversity Network (CDN) scheme to double the number of people with disabilities working in the television industry by 2020.
20	Wolf Alice are revealed as winners of the 2018 Mercury Prize for their second album Visions of a Life in a live telecast of the ceremony from London's Eventim Apollo on BBC Four.
23	Sky has recommended its shareholders accept a takeover bid from Comcast over one put forward by Fox after the former outbid the latter. The £30bn bid was submitted in a rare blind auction organised by the UK's Panel on Takeovers and Mergers and marks the end of an eight-year uncertainty about Sky's future direction.
23	The BBC One thriller Bodyguard concludes with a cliffhanger episode. Overnight viewing figures indicate the programme to have been watched by an average 10.4 million viewers, peaking at 11 million in the final five minutes. In terms of viewership, the series is also the most successful BBC drama for a decade.
24	The first episode of series 11 of Doctor Who receives its premiere in Sheffield two weeks before its television debut. The episode is set in the city.
24	Ofcom says it will launch an inquiry into Celebrity Big Brother after receiving over 25,000 complaints about Roxanne Pallett's allegation she was physically abused by Ryan Thomas.
24	It is reported that a dance teacher who runs a class for larger people called Strictly Curved has been ordered to change the name of her business by the BBC amid concerns it could mislead people into believing it is associated with the series Strictly Come Dancing. She subsequently confirms plans to change the name of the business after saying she cannot afford to fight any potential legal action from the BBC.
24	ITV confirms that Emmerdale character Kim Tate is returning for a special week of episodes from 8 October 2018. Claire King will reprise her role as Kim Tate for this first time after nearly 20 years away.
25	The Broadcasters' Audience Research Board (BARB) announces it has started including viewers using PCs and mobile devices when compiling audience figures. The result means an increase in viewership for television programmes. For example, ITV2's Love Island would have received a million more viewers than shown by official figures, with 3.9 million tuning in each day.
25	BBC Two airs The Flu That Killed 50 Million, a docudrama about the 1918 Spanish flu pandemic narrated by Christopher Eccleston.
25	VH1 announces that next moth it will complete its transition to a general entertainment format with the introduction of VH1 US programs, including Love & Hip Hop: Miami and Ru Paul's Drag Race. However music programmes will continue in non-prime timeslots.
26	21st Century Fox announces it will sell its 39% stake in Sky UK to Comcast, ending Rupert Murdoch's three-decade association with the broadcaster.
27	BBC Two receives a new set of idents. The Curve idents replace the '2' logo in various ident sets since 1991.
28	To mark BBC Music Day, railway stations around the country play a number of prerecorded announcements made by the singer Kylie Minogue.
28	BBC One airs a special edition of Bargain Hunt recorded for BBC Music Day featuring members of the bands Happy Mondays and Pulp. It is reported that the end of the programme had to be re-recorded after it was discovered one of the participants had broken the rules.

=== October ===
Date	Event
1	Sharon Osbourne pulls out of series fifteen of The X Factor after deciding she was not needed. Although not a judge for the 2018 series, she had been scheduled to appear in the show's live editions.
2	As part of plans to revamp its daytime schedule BBC One announces that Flog It! will be axed after seventeen years.
2	ITV's This Morning receives a special BAFTA award to celebrate its 30th anniversary. The programme's 30th anniversary occurs on 3 October, with that day's edition resurrecting the floating weather map in Liverpool's Albert Dock. The weather is presented by Alison Hammond, who accidentally pushes a man dressed as a sailor off the map and into the water.
2	Plans are announced for the science fiction anthology series Black Mirror to include an interactive episode in its fifth series, the outcome of which will be decided by viewers.
7	BBC One airs the Doctor Who series eleven opener "The Woman Who Fell to Earth", Jodie Whittaker's debut episode as the Thirteenth Doctor. Figures suggest an audience of 8.2 million, giving the series its best audience for a series launch for a decade. Consolidated figures released by BARB on 16 October indicate it had an audience of 10.9 million, making it the highest rated series opener since Doctor Who returned to television in 2005.
8	Alex Hobern, playing as a 25-year-old woman called Kate, wins the first series of Channel 4's social media based game show The Circle.
9	Producers of Hollyoaks confirm that Rick Astley will make a cameo appearance in a forthcoming episode of the Channel 4 soap.
10	The BBC announces it has reversed planned cuts to the output of BBC Parliament, but warns of possible future cuts to other services in order to save £500m before 2021–22.
11	After 6 years on air, Global Radio closes Heart TV and Capital TV.
11	The day's edition of BBC One's Question Time comes from the Scottish Parliament in Edinburgh.
12	ITV airs full coverage of the wedding of Princess Eugenie and Jack Brooksbank with a special edition of This Morning presented by Eamonn Holmes and Ruth Langsford. ITV is the only main channel to show the ceremony in full after the BBC decided it would show a highlights programme instead.
12	Following Claire King's week-long return to Emmerdale as Kim Tate, bosses of the soap announce she is returning to the role permanently.
12	Ireland's The Late Late Show is broadcast live from Central Hall Westminster in London, the first time the programme has broadcast from the United Kingdom since 1980.
14	Debut of ITV's three-part drama Butterfly which deals with the subject of a couple coming to terms with their "son's" wish to become a girl.
21	The Doctor Who episode "Rosa" is one of few episodes in the programme's history not to end with the traditional closing theme music, instead having its closing credits played out with the track "Rise Up" by Andra Day.
22	Paddy McGuinness and Andrew Flintoff are named as the new presenters of Top Gear, replacing Matt LeBlanc, who steps down from the role at the end of series 26.
23	John Morrison, a former editor of Newsnight criticises the programme, which he says should "stop obsessing about the gender" of its presenters.
23	Historical documentary Inside the Tower of London makes its debut on Channel 5. The documentary is narrated by McDonald & Dodds actor Jason Watkins, which goes behind the scenes of the iconic fortress as well as the daily lives of the Yeoman Warders.
25	Debut of The Bi Life, a bisexual dating show, on the E! channel.
27	Former England manager Glenn Hoddle is taken ill shortly after appearing on BT Sport as a football pundit. He is treated in hospital, and it is subsequently confirmed that he has suffered a heart attack.
28	Seann Walsh and dance partner Katya Jones are voted off Series 16 of Strictly Come Dancing. The pair were the subject of controversy during Walsh's time on the programme after they were photographed kissing outside a pub.
28	BBC Two airs a live episode of the anthology series Inside No. 9 to coincide with Halloween.
29	While reporting on the aftermath of the death of Leicester City chairman Vichai Srivaddhanaprabha in a helicopter crash, BBC sports editor Dan Roan is overheard making what many believed to be distasteful remarks about the nature of Srivaddhanaprabha's relationship with a member of his staff who also died in the crash. Roan later apologises for the remarks, claiming they were "made in a private, off-air conversation with a colleague".
30	Rahul Mandal wins the ninth series of The Great British Bake Off. Overnight viewing figures suggest an audience of 7.5 million tuned into the series finale.
30	Evan Davis presents his final Newsnight after four years as its lead presenter.
31	Channel 4 announces it has chosen Leeds in West Yorkshire as the location of its new national headquarters, although it will still retain a headquarters in London. Operations will also be established in Bristol and Glasgow under plans for the broadcaster to boost the amount it spends on programming outside London.

=== November ===
Date	Event
1	Ariana Grande at the BBC airs on BBC One. The one-hour special sees Ariana Grande talking to Davina McCall about her life and career, as well as performing some of her tracks.
3	The X Factor cancels its public vote after viewers complain of poor sound quality on the evening's edition of the show, with voting taking place the following day instead.
5	Cameron Cole wins the nineteenth series of Big Brother and the last to air on Channel 5. He becomes the show's youngest winner. It marked the last time that Emma Willis has hosted the reality show for the past 5 years. Big Brother would later return to ITV2 from 2023 onwards with future hosts AJ Odudu and Will Best.
7	Businessman and Leave.EU donor Arron Banks, who was scheduled to be a panelist on the 15 November edition of Question Time, is dropped from the edition following controversy over previous television appearances, and criticism from politicians because he is the subject of a National Crime Agency investigation into alleged offences committed during the 2016 EU referendum.
8	Figures released by TV Licensing indicate there are 7,161 UK households watching television with a black-and-white licences, a decline from 212,000 in 2000.
9	Orlando Bloom becomes the latest celebrity to read a bedtime story on CBeebies when he reads We Are Together by Britta Teckentrup.
13	ITV confirms that Emmerdale character Mandy Dingle is returning for a special storyline in January 2019. Lisa Riley will reprise her role as Mandy Dingle for the first time after 17 years away.
15	The BBC announces that the 2018 Doctor Who Christmas special will air on New Year's Day 2019, the first time the Christmas special has not aired on Christmas Day since the series returned to television screens in 2005.
16	Children in Need 2018 is aired on BBC television, with £50.6m donated during the course of its broadcast. This brings the collective total raised by Children in Need to £1bn.
16	Rob Delaney is the latest celebrity to read a CBeebies Bedtime Story, with Ten in a Bed by Penny Dale. In a first for the channel the story also includes sign language provided by Makaton.
18	ITV begins airing the eighteenth series of I'm a Celebrity...Get Me Out of Here! presented by Holly Willoughby and Declan Donnelly.
20	The BBC Two programmes Winterwatch, Springwatch and Autumnwatch will be broadcast from the Cairngorms in 2019.
22	The Doctor Who episode "The Witchfinders" is released to Amazon Prime subscribers three days before its BBC One broadcast, when the streaming service accidentally uploads it to the slot for the previous episode, "Kerblam!", instead of that episode.
22	In an article published by The Sun newspaper, television presenter Matthew Wright says the stress of presenting Channel 5's The Wright Stuff left him with symptoms of post-traumatic stress disorder.
22	BBC Four airs a one-off 90-minute special live and interactive edition of Tomorrow's World. The programme is presented by two of the original presenters, Maggie Philbin and Howard Stableford, as well as Dr. Hannah Fry.
23	Channel 4 soap Hollyoaks announces plans for a far-right radicalisation story involving the character Ste Hay (played by Kieron Richardson) in order to raise awareness of the issue.
23	BBC newsreader Fiona Bruce is reported to be in talks with Question Time bosses about taking over the presenting role from David Dimbleby when he retires.
27	Prime Minister Theresa May and Leader of the Opposition Jeremy Corbyn both agree to take part in a live television debate on Brexit before MPs vote on the UK's withdrawal agreement negotiated with the European Union.
27	Observational documentary Our Yorkshire Farm makes its debut on Channel 5 for the first time. The show consists of Amanda Owen, her husband Clive and her nine children: Raven, Reuben, Miles, Edith, Violet, Sidney, Annas, Clementine and Nancy. The documentary is narrated by Death in Paradise actor Ralf Little, which goes behind the scenes of farming life in Ravenseat Farm.
29	The BBC announces Sunday 9 December as the date for its televised Brexit debate, and in doing so sparks a political row. Theresa May has given her backing to the BBC debate, while Jeremy Corbyn had previously said he favoured appearing on ITV.
29	HD Simulcast channels of BBC Two Wales and BBC Two Northern Ireland begin broadcasting.

=== December ===
Date	Event
1	BBC One unveils their Christmas short film/Ident campaign following the evening's edition of Strictly Come Dancing. "Wonderland" follows the story of a mother and son, played by Caroline O'Hara and Micky Satiar, spending time together during the holiday season. Filmed at Cromer Pier, the short was made by BBC Creative and Rogue Films, directed by Sam Brown and concepted by Edward Usher and Xander Hart.
2	Jodie Whittaker is announced as the latest celebrity to read a CBeebies Bedtime Story. In an episode to air later in the month, she will read Ada Twist, Scientist by Andrea Beaty and David Roberts.
2	Dalton Harris wins the fifteenth series of The X Factor.
4	The BBC scraps plans to hold a Brexit debate between Prime Minister Theresa May and Leader of the Opposition Jeremy Corbyn after failing to reach an agreement on the proposed format of the debate, which the Labour Party had criticised as a "mish-mash, with a lop-sided panel of other politicians and public figures". Both the BBC and ITV had scheduled Brexit debates for the evening of Sunday 9 December, each billed as featuring May and Corbyn even though it would be physically impossible for them to participate in both.
5	BBC Three announce that they have commissioned the British version of popular American reality TV show RuPaul's Drag Race. RuPaul's Drag Race: UK will air in 2019.
6	ITV scraps its plans for a Brexit debate between Theresa May and Jeremy Corbyn on 9 December, making the announcement two days after the BBC decided not to hold its own Brexit debate scheduled for the same evening.
7	Fiona Bruce is confirmed as David Dimbleby's successor as presenter of Question Time.
7	Twentieth anniversary of the launch of ITV2.
9	As BBC One airs the concluding episode of series 11 of Doctor Who, series showrunner Chris Chibnall confirms that series 12 will air in 2020, and that Jodie Whittaker will once again star.
9	Harry Redknapp wins the eighteenth series of I'm a Celebrity...Get Me Out of Here!.
13	A report from the National Audit Office reveals that plans to expand the EastEnders set will cost £27m more than previously estimated. In 2015 it was forecast the scheme would cost £59.7m, but the cost of the project is now put at £86.7m.
13	After nearly 25 years, David Dimbleby presents his final edition of Question Time.
13	BBC News appoints Ben Hunte as its first LGBT correspondent.
13	Match of the Day presenter Gary Lineker is criticised by cricket presenter Jonathan Agnew for expressing his political views about Brexit on Twitter. Agnew argues that as "the face of BBC Sport" Lineker should "observe BBC editorial guidelines".
15	Stacey Dooley and dance partner Kevin Clifton win the sixteenth series of Strictly Come Dancing. Overnight viewing figures indicate the programme was seen by an average audience of 11.7 million, peaking at 12.7 million, and making it the most watched edition of Strictly in 2018.
16	2018 Tour de France winner Geraint Thomas is named the 2018 BBC Sports Personality of the Year. The evening also sees the Lightning Seeds reunited with David Baddiel and Frank Skinner to perform a special rendition of "Three Lions".
16	Sian Gabbidon wins the fourteenth series of The Apprentice.
17	Tom Watt and Linda Davidson will reprise their roles as EastEnders characters Lofty Holloway and Mary Smith in early 2019. The storyline involving Lofty and Mary will see them returning to Walford to attend the funeral of Dr. Harold Legg (Leonard Fenton) following Legg's death from pancreatic cancer.
20	Media regulator Ofcom has ruled that news channel RT broke impartiality rules on seven programmes following the Salisbury poisoning. Ofcom says the rule breaches took place between 17 March and 26 April. In response to the decision, the Russia media regulator says that it will check the content of BBC World News and the BBC's websites for impartiality.
23	BBC Four airs After the Screaming Stops, a 90-minute documentary about the 2017 reunion of 1980s pop band Bros. The documentary is initially watched by fewer than 250,000 viewers, but later becomes one of the 2018 Christmas television highlights thanks to its popularity on BBC iPlayer.
26	Overnight viewing figures for Christmas Day indicate The Queen's Speech to be the programme with the largest audience of the day, with a combined audience of 6.4 million viewers. The figures also suggest the largest audience for a programme broadcast on a single channel is for Michael McIntyre's Big Christmas Show on BBC One with 6.1 million viewers. The top five also include three other BBC One programmes, the Christmas specials of Strictly Come Dancing and Call the Midwife, and the 2016 remake of The Jungle Book.
28	The BBC confirms that its long-running film review series The Film Programme will not return for a new series in 2019.
28	Those from the world of television to receive recognition in the 2019 New Year Honours include actor Michael Palin who receives a Knighthood, model, actress and television presenter Twiggy Lawson who becomes a Dame, and conservationist Chris Packham who receives a CBE.
31	British premiere on Sky Arts of English comedy sketch Dinner for One with Freddie Frinton, recorded in English in 1963 by Norddeutscher Rundfunk before an audience in Hamburg and regularly repeated on New Year's Eve in Germany and elsewhere, but not previously seen in its entirety on British television.
31	BBC One welcomes in 2019 with a concert by Madness. The programme pauses at midnight for the Chimes of Big Ben and fireworks display.

== Top 10 most-watched television broadcasts of this year ==
=== BARB consolidated 7-day viewing figures ===
The Broadcasters' Audience Research Board (BARB) used this method of measurement until August 2018. Viewing figures details include +1 and HD channels. Highest rated single episode, instalment or match per channel.

Rank	Programme	Number of viewers in millions	Date	Network	Brief description
1	2018 FIFA World Cup : Croatia vs England	20.7	11 July	ITV	England lose to Croatia 2–1 in Moscow in their first semi-final of a World Cup since 1990.
2	2018 FIFA World Cup : Sweden vs England	17.4	7 July	BBC One	England win against Sweden 2–0 in Samara to proceed to their first World Cup semi-final since 1990.
3	Bodyguard	14.3	23 September	BBC One	The final episode of the first series. Aikens (Matt Stokoe) abducts Budd (Richard Madden) and fits him inside a suicide vest. The police then are called by Budd and refuse to believe his version of events as they believe he is involved in the conspiracy due to his links to Apsted (Tom Brooke). Budd suspects MI5 is watching him and gives false information regarding the information of the kompromat. The security service then sends Longcross (Michael Schaeffer) to retrieve it, who is then arrested by the police on site. Budd's innocence is then proven after he leads the police to his flat and Vicky (Sophie Rundle) discovers the kompromat and blank rounds from his firearm. Budd then discovers that Craddock (Pippa Haywood) is the police insider for Aikens. She then confesses to providing Aikens information regarding Montague's (Keeley Hawes) whereabouts which led to her assassination and chose Budd to be her PPO as his background made him the perfect fall guy. Nadia (Anjli Mohindra) is later interviewed again and is revealed to have lied about Longcross's e-fit and is the builder of the explosive devices and led to the attack on the school of Budd's children.
4	I'm a Celebrity Get Me Out of Here	13.7	18 November	ITV	Holly Willoughby makes her debut as co-presenter alongside Declan Donnelly whilst Ant McPartlin is on a break marking the first time the series is not presented by Donnelly and McPartlin in the show's history. The launch programme receives the highest ratings for an opener in the show's 16-year history. The series includes a line-up of celebrities including actor John Barrowman, singer Fleur East, quizzer Anne Hegerty and football manager Harry Redknapp.
5	Strictly Come Dancing	11.9	13 October	BBC One	The fourth live show of sixteenth series which saw Stacey Dooley and her partner Kevin Clifton go to the top of the leaderboard with a score of 33 for their Foxtrot to Hi Ho Silver Lining by Jeff Beck.
6	Britain's Got Talent	11.2	3 June	ITV	The final of the twelfth series, which was won by comedian Lost Voice Guy, beating pianist Robert White and reggae singer Donchez Dacres. Performers from Tina : The Musical also performed.
7	Doctor Who	10.5	14 October	BBC One	The launch of the eleventh series and the debut of the Thirteenth Doctor (Jodie Whittaker), the first female incarnation of the time-travelling Time Lord. The episode titled "The Woman Who Fell to Earth" saw The Doctor fall on to Sheffield following the events of "Twice Upon a Time", battle an alien known by the name of "Tzim-Sha/Tim Shaw" (Samuel Oatley), construct a new sonic-screwdriver and encounter bus driver Graham O'Brien (Bradley Walsh), police officer Yasmin Khan (Mandip Gill), and a warehouse worker who has dyspraxia Ryan Sinclair (Tosin Cole), who later become her companions. The episode was the first to be broadcast on Sunday of the modern revival of the programme and achieved the programme its highest ratings for a premiere of a series beating the 2005 episode "Rose" and its highest consolidated ratings since The Time of the Doctor in 2013. The episode is also the highest drama-launch of the year.
8	The Great British Bake Off	9.9	28 August	Channel 4	The first episode of the ninth series breaking with tradition and focusing on biscuits. County Tyrone recreation officer, Imelda McCarron, is eliminated whilst London software project manager, Manon Lagrève, is crowned the first star baker of the series.
9	Call the Midwife	9.6	11 March	BBC One	The final episode of the seventh series sees the aftermath of the funeral of Barbara (Charlotte Ritchie) and Sister Monica Joan's (Judy Parfitt) birthday party which is later interrupted by news of the Assassination of President Kennedy.
10	Coronation Street	9.4	30 March	ITV	Eileen Grimshaw (Sue Cleaver) learns the truth about her husband Pat Phelan's (Connor McIntyre) killer ways and throws him off a pier.

== Debuts ==
=== BBC ===
Date	Debut	Channel
1 January	McMafia	BBC One
3 January	Miriam's Big American Adventure	BBC One
3 January	Tom Kerridge's Lose Weight For Good	BBC Two
4 January	A House Through Time	BBC Two
4 January	Hairy Bikers' Mediterranean Adventure	BBC Two
5 January	Rome Unpacked	BBC Two
6 January	Hugh's Wild West	BBC Two
6 January	And They're Off!	BBC One
6 January	Wedding Day Winners	BBC One
6 January	Hard Sun	BBC One
8 January	Surgeons: At the Edge of Life	BBC Two
16 January	Art, Passion & Power: The Story of the Royal Collection	BBC Four
27 January	All Together Now	BBC One
2 February	Requiem	BBC One
6 February	Flatpack Empire	BBC Two
12 February	Collateral	BBC Two
17 February	Troy: Fall of a City	BBC One
18 February	Hold the Sunset	BBC One
26 February	Murder, Mystery and My Family	BBC One
26 February	Shakespeare & Hathaway: Private Investigators	BBC One
1 March	Civilisations	BBC Two
2 March	Soft Border Patrol	BBC One Northern Ireland
7 March	Lucy Worsley's Fireworks for a Tudor Queen	BBC Four
11 March	Sir Bruce: A Celebration	BBC One
12 March	Bitz & Bob	CBeebies
13 March	The Ruth Ellis Files: A Very British Crime Story	BBC Four
16 March	Pilgrimage (TV series)	BBC Two
18 March	Famously Unfit for Sport Relief	BBC Two
20 March	Great Indian Railway Journeys	BBC Two
27 March	Come Home	BBC One
31 March	Ready or Not	BBC One
1 April	Ordeal by Innocence	BBC One
3 April	Cunk on Britain	BBC Two
6 April	The City and the City	BBC Two
16 April	Flipping Profit	BBC One
16 April	Nightmare Pets SOS	BBC One
16 April	Britain in Bloom	BBC Two
17 April	Stephen: The Murder That Changed a Nation	BBC One
17 April	Top of the Shop with Tom Kerridge	BBC Two
20 April	The Button	BBC One
22 April	The Woman in White	BBC One
24 April	The Split	BBC One
25 April	Britain's Fat Fight with Hugh Fearnley-Whittingstall	BBC One
2 May	Love in the Countryside	BBC Two
20 May	A Very English Scandal	BBC One
25 May	BBC Music's Biggest Weekend	BBC One / BBC Two / BBC Four
3 June	Frankie Goes to Russia	BBC Two
20 June	Mortimer & Whitehouse: Gone Fishing	BBC Two
26 June	Reporting Trump's First Year: The Fourth Estate	BBC Two
1 July	The Misadventures of Romesh Ranganathan	BBC Two
6 July	Smashing Hits! The 80s Pop Map of Britain and Ireland	BBC Four
16 July	Nadiya's Family Favourites	BBC Two
17 July	Mark Kermode's Secrets of Cinema	BBC Four
18 July	Animals Behaving Badly	BBC One
22 July	One Hot Summer	BBC Three
29 July	Travels in Trumpland with Ed Balls	BBC Two
31 July	Age Before Beauty	BBC One
6 August	What iS Music Videos?	BBC iPlayer
26 August	Bodyguard	BBC One
3 September	One Day That Changed My Life	BBC One
3 September	Politics Live	BBC Two
3 September	Mother's Day	BBC Two
4 September	Wanderlust	BBC One
4 September	We Are British Jews	BBC Two
6 September	Press	BBC One
6 September	The Mighty Redcar	BBC Two
7 September	Ancient Invisible Cities	BBC Two
10 September	Black Earth Rising	BBC Two
10 September	Oceans Apart: Art and the Pacific with James Fox	BBC Four
12 September	Trust	BBC One
15 September	Killing Eve	BBC Three
17 September	Chase the Case	BBC One
17 September	Monkman & Seagull's Genius Guide to Britain	BBC Two
19 September	Defending the Guilty	BBC Two
30 September	The Cry	BBC One
1 October	Drowning in Plastic	BBC One
2 October	Tourist Trap	BBC One Wales
7 October	Mediterranean with Simon Reeve	BBC Two
7 October	Last Chance Lawyer NYC	BBC Two
8 October	Armchair Britain	BBC One
13 October	Black Hollywood: "They've Gotta Have Us"	BBC Two
14 October	In My Skin	BBC Three
15 October	For Facts Sake	BBC One
16 October	Informer	BBC One
16 October	There She Goes	BBC Four
19 October	The Lakes with Paul Rose	BBC Two
28 October	The Little Drummer Girl	BBC One
3 November	The Time It Takes	BBC One
5 November	Doing Money	BBC Two
6 November	I'll Get This	BBC Two
11 November	Dynasties	BBC One
26 November	Babies: Their Wonderful World	BBC Two
26 November	Defenders UK	BBC One
27 November	Mrs Wilson	BBC One
28 November	Death and Nightingales	BBC Two
29 November	Enterprice	BBC Three
9 December	Care	BBC One
18 December	The Long Song	BBC One
22 December	Watership Down	BBC One
24 December	The Dead Room	BBC Four
25 December	Zog	BBC One
26 December	The ABC Murders	BBC One
30 December	Cities: Nature's New Wild	BBC Two
30 December	Les Misérables	BBC One

=== ITV ===
Date	Debut	Channel
3 January	Girlfriends	ITV
4 January	Great Art	ITV
8 January	Next of Kin	ITV
10 January	Britain's Brightest Family	ITV
11 January	Transformation Street	ITV
6 February	What Would Your Kid Do?	ITV
11 February	Survival of the Fittest	ITV2
12 February	James Martin's American Adventure	ITV
12 February	Trauma	ITV
27 February	100 Years Younger in 21 Days	ITV
5 March	Action Team	ITV2
28 March	The Real Full Monty: Live	ITV
29 March	The Real Full Monty: Ladies Night	ITV
1 April	Change Your Tune	ITV
3 April	Last Laugh in Vegas	ITV
14 April	Zoe Ball on Saturday	ITV
15 April	Zoe Ball on Sunday	ITV
16 April	The Queen's Green Planet	ITV
14 May	Innocent	ITV
21 May	The NHS Heroes Awards	ITV
22 May	A&E Live	ITV
5 July	Keith Lemon: Coming in America	ITV2
14 July	Japandemonium	ITV
19 July	Our Shirley Valentine Summer	ITV
25 July	The Bletchley Circle: San Francisco	ITV
2 August	Evil Monkeys	ITV2
7 August	My £10K Holiday Home	ITV
8 August	Paul O Grady's Little Heroes	ITV
29 August	Gemma Collins: Diva	ITVBe
2 September	Vanity Fair	ITV
2 September	The Imitation Game	ITV
6 September	Ross Kemp and The Armed Police	ITV
10 September	Strangers	ITV
12 September	Joanna Lumley's Silk Road Adventure	ITV
14 September	The Island Strait	ITV
25 September	Queen of the World	ITV
25 September	Take the Tower	ITV4
25 September	Football Genius	ITV4
26 September	Peston	ITV
5 October	The Big Audition	ITV
11 October	Don't Hate the Playaz	ITV2
14 October	Butterfly	ITV
15 December	Big Star's Bigger Star	ITV
25 December	Torvill and Dean	ITV

=== Channel 4 ===
Date	Debut	Channel
4 January	Derry Girls	Channel 4
7 January	The Biggest Little Railway in the World	Channel 4
7 January	Craith	S4C
9 January	Working Class White Men	Channel 4
10 January	Kiri	Channel 4
12 March	Five Star Hotel	E4
19 March	Star Boot Sale	Channel 4
29 March	Indian Summer School	Channel 4
30 March	Lee and Dean	Channel 4
30 March	Rob Beckett's Playing for Time	Channel 4
2 April	Kiss Me First	Channel 4
6 April	I Don't Like Mondays	Channel 4
10 April	Class of Mum and Dad	Channel 4
16 April	Buy It Now	Channel 4
19 April	True Horror	Channel 4
20 April	The Real Football Fan Show	Channel 4
23 April	Holidays Unpacked	Channel 4
27 April	Our Wildest Dreams	Channel 4
3 May	Let's Get Physical	E4
4 May	High & Dry	Channel 4
7 May	Genderquake	Channel 4
23 May	Carry On Brussels: Inside the EU	Channel 4
5 June	Bride & Prejudice	Channel 4
10 June	Bang on Budget	Channel 4
25 June	Inside the American Embassy	Channel 4
27 June	Stath Lets Flats	Channel 4
29 June	The Big Narstie Show	Channel 4
16 July	Who Is America?	Channel 4
18 July	Live Well for Longer	Channel 4
19 July	Prison	Channel 4
19 July	Ramsay's 24 Hours to Hell and Back	Channel 4
22 July	Artist in Residence	Channel 4
23 July	How to Get Rich Quick	Channel 4
28 July	A Year in the New Forest	Channel 4
28 July	My Family and the Galapagos	Channel 4
2 August	Meet the Drug Lords: Inside the Real Narcos	Channel 4
5 August	Flying Across Britain with Arthur Williams	Channel 4
6 August	Saving Poundstretcher	Channel 4
8 August	Hang Ups	Channel 4
10 August	Peng Life	Channel 4
15 August	Orangutan Jungle School	Channel 4
23 August	Grayson Perry: Rites of Passage	Channel 4
17 September	Super Salon	E4
18 September	The Circle	Channel 4
10 October	The Bisexual	Channel 4
14 October	Club Rep Wars	E4
1 November	The First	Channel 4
12 November	Liam Bakes	Channel 4

=== Channel 5 ===
Date	Debut	Channel
2 January	Diet Secrets & How To Lose Weight	Channel 5
5 January	Costa Del Celebrity	Channel 5
6 February	Celebrity Ghost Hunt	5Star
13 February	The Secret Life of Owls	5Select
15 February	Striking Out	5Select
6 March	Wild Britain	Channel 5
8 March	Do the Right Thing with Eamonn and Ruth	Channel 5
18 April	Rich Kids Go Skint	5Star
20 April	Portillo's Hidden History of Britain	Channel 5
20 May	Top of the Box	Channel 5
6 June	Shop Smart Save Money	Channel 5
16 June	Chuckle Time	Channel 5
1 August	Britain's Parking Hell	Channel 5
10 August	Under Attack	5Spike
20 August	Celebs on the Farm	5Star
1 September	How the Victorians Built Britain	Channel 5
3 September	Jeremy Vine	Channel 5
3 September	Undercover Girlfriends	Channel 5
19 September	Casualty 24/7	Channel 5
20 September	Michael Palin in North Korea	Channel 5
21 September	Walking Britain's Lost Railways	Channel 5
5 October	The Great Model Railway Challenge	Channel 5
17 October	How To Get A Good Night's Sleep	Channel 5
23 October	Inside the Tower of London	Channel 5
15 November	Robbing Your Relatives	Channel 5
22 November	Esther Rantzen's House Trap	Channel 5
23 November	Britain by Boat	Channel 5
27 November	Our Yorkshire Farm	Channel 5
29 November	Oxford Street 24/7	
23 December	Agatha and the Truth of Murder	

=== Other channels ===
Date	Debut	Channel
15 January	The Wave	W
15 January	Roast Battle	Comedy Central
18 January	Britannia	Sky Atlantic
14 February	Bliss	Sky One
21 February	Celebrity Haunted Mansion: High Spirits	W
21 February	Celebrity Haunted Mansion	W
28 February	Save Me	Sky Atlantic
29 March	In the Long Run	Sky One
1 April	Revolution	Sky One
13 May	Patrick Melrose	Sky Atlantic
16 May	Jon Richardson: Ultimate Worrier	Dave
2 July	Becca's Bunch	Nick Jr.
23 July	Inside the Vets	W
6 August	True Love or True Lies	MTV
8 August	Judge Romesh	Dave
21 August	Call Yourself a Fan	BT Sport 2
14 September	A Discovery of Witches	Sky One
27 September	Sick of It	Sky One
5 October	My Favourite Sketch	Gold
11 October	Women on the Verge	W
22 October	Emma Willis: Delivering Babies	W
25 October	Sally4Ever	Sky Atlantic
30 October	The Reluctant Landlord	Sky One
9 November	The Heist	Sky One
15 November	Beat the Internet	Dave
14 December	Sunderland Till I Die	Netflix
14 December	101 Dalmatian Street	Disney Channel
15 December	Death on the Tyne	Gold
24 December	The Queen and I	Sky One

== Channels and streaming services ==
=== New channels ===
Date	Channel
1 March	MTV OMG
30 April	Discovery Turbo +1
23 May	Club MTV
4 July	Paramount Network
15 September	BT Sport Box Office
15 September	BT Sport Box Office HD

=== Defunct channels ===
Date	Channel
31 January	Viva
1 May	ITV Encore
23 May	MTV Dance
1 July	STV2
10 August	Vintage TV (online only until November)
30 September	Motorsport.tv
11 October	Heart TV
11 October	Capital TV
15 November	Scuzz

=== Rebranding channels ===
Date	Old Name	New Name
6 February	Sony Channel	Sony Crime Channel
6 February	True Crime	Sony Crime Channel 2
13 February	My5	5Select
31 May	Channel AKA	Massive R&B
1 July	Cartoon Network +1	Ben 10 Channel
11 July	Ben 10 Channel	Cartoon Network +1
6 August	Sky Living	Sky Witness
October	CBS Action	CBS Justice
1 November	Massive R&B	Total Country

== Television programmes ==
=== Changes of network affiliation ===
Programme	Moved from	Moved to
Gotham	Channel 5, Netflix	E4
Classic EastEnders	Watch	Drama
The Last Kingdom	BBC Two	Netflix

=== Returning this year after a break of one year or longer ===
Programme	Date(s) of original removal	Original channel(s)	Date of return	New channel(s)
Dancing on Ice	9 March 2014	ITV	7 January 2018	N/A (same channel as original)
Diddy TV	16 December 2016	CBBC	19 March 2018	N/A (same channel as original)
The Generation Game	31 December 2005	BBC One	1 April 2018	N/A (same channel as original)
Who Wants to Be a Millionaire?	11 February 2014	ITV	5 May 2018	N/A (same channel as original)
The £100K Drop	20 March 2015	Channel 4	7 May 2018	N/A (same channel as original)
Gino's Win Your Wish List	7 May 2016	BBC One	28 July 2018	Channel 5
Classic EastEnders	15 October 2009	Watch	6 August 2018	Drama
Sooty	1 December 2013	CITV	3 September 2018	LittleBe
Junior Eurovision Song Contest	26 November 2005	ITV (2003); ITV2 (2004–05)	25 November 2018	S4C

== Continuing television programmes ==
=== 1920s ===
Programme	Date
BBC Wimbledon	(1927–1939, 1946–2019, 2021–present)

=== 1930s ===
Programme	Date
Trooping the Colour	1937–1939, 1946–2019, 2023–present
The Boat Race	(1938–1939, 1946–2019, 2021–present)

=== 1950s ===
Programme	Date
Panorama	(1953–present)
Eurovision Song Contest	(1956–2019, 2021–present)
The Sky at Night	(1957–present)
Final Score	(1958–present) (part of Grandstand 1958–2001)
Blue Peter	(1958–present)

=== 1960s ===
Programme	Date
Coronation Street	(1960–present)
Maigret	(1960–1963, 1992–1993, 2016–present)
Points of View	(1961–present)
Songs of Praise	(1961–present)
University Challenge	(1962–1987, 1994–present)
Doctor Who	(1963–1989, 1996, 2005–present)
Horizon	(1964–present)
Match of the Day	(1964–present)
Top of the Pops	(1964–present) (only at Christmas 2006–present)
Gardeners' World	(1968–present)
A Question of Sport	(1968, 1970–present)

=== 1970s ===
Programme	Date
Emmerdale	(1972–present)
Mastermind (including Celebrity Mastermind)	(1972–1997, 2003–present)
Newsround	(1972–present)
Football Focus	(1974–present)
Porridge	(1974–1977, 2016–present)
Arena	(1975–present)
One Man and His Dog	(1976–present)
Top Gear	(1977–2001, 2002–present)
Ski Sunday	(1978–present)
Antiques Roadshow	(1979–present)
Question Time	(1979–present)

=== 1980s ===
Programme	Date
Children in Need	(1980–present)
Countdown	(1982–present)
ITV Breakfast	(1983–present)
Thomas & Friends	(1984–present)
EastEnders	(1985–present)
Watchdog	(1985–present)
Comic Relief	(1985–present)
Catchphrase	(1986–2002, 2013–present)
Casualty	(1986–present)
Fifteen to One	(1988–2003, 2013–present)
Red Dwarf	(1988–1999, 2009, 2012–present)
This Morning	(1988–present)
Countryfile	(1988–present)

=== 1990s ===
Programme	Date
The Crystal Maze	(1990–1995, 2016–present)
Have I Got News for You	(1990–present)
MasterChef	(1990–2001, 2005–present)
ITV News Meridian	(1993–present)
Junior MasterChef	(1994–1999, 2010–present)
Room 101	(1994–2007, 2012–present)
Top of the Pops 2	(1994–present)
Hollyoaks	(1995–present)
Soccer AM	(1995–present)
Silent Witness	(1996–present)
Midsomer Murders	(1997–present)
Robot Wars	(1997–2004, 2016–2018)
Teletubbies	(1997–2002, 2007–2009, 2012, 2015–present)
Y Clwb Rygbi	(1997–present)
Cold Feet	(1998–2003, 2016–present)
British Soap Awards	(1999–2019, 2022–present)
Holby City	(1999–2022)
Loose Women	(1999–present)

=== 2000s ===
Programme	Date
2000
Big Brother (including Celebrity Big Brother)	(2000–2018)
Bargain Hunt	(2000–present)
BBC Breakfast	(2000–present)
Click	(2000–present)
Doctors	(2000–present)
A Place in the Sun	(2000–present)
The Unforgettable	(2000–2002, 2010–present)
Unreported World	(2000–present)
2001
BBC South East Today	(2001–present)
Rogue Traders	(2001–present) (part of Watchdog 2009–present)
2002
Escape to the Country	(2002–present)
Flog It!	(2002–present)
I'm a Celebrity...Get Me Out of Here!	(2002–present)
Inside Out	(2002–present)
Most Haunted	(2002–2010, 2014–present)
River City	(2002–2026)
Still Game	(2002–2007, 2016)
Saturday Kitchen	(2002–present)
2003
Daily Politics	(2003–2018)
QI	(2003–present)
This Week	(2003–present)
Eggheads	(2003–present)
Extraordinary People	(2003–present)
Grumpy Old Men	(2003–present)
Homes Under the Hammer	(2003–present)
Traffic Cops	(2003–present)
2004
Doc Martin	(2004–2019)
Match of the Day 2	(2004–present)
Strictly Come Dancing	(2004–present)
The X Factor	(2004–2018, 2022–present)
The Big Fat Quiz of the Year	(2004–present)
The Culture Show	(2004–present)
Football First	(2004–present)
The Gadget Show	(2004–present)
Live at the Apollo	(2004–present)
NewsWatch	(2004–present)
SadlerVision	(2004–present)
Strictly Come Dancing: It Takes Two	(2004–present)
Who Do You Think You Are?	(2004–present)
2005
8 out of 10 Cats	(2005–present)
Coach Trip	(2005–2006, 2009–2012, 2013–present)
The Andrew Marr Show	(2005–present)
The Adventure Show	(2005–present)
The Apprentice	(2005–present)
Dragons' Den	(2005–present)
The Hotel Inspector	(2005–present)
The Jeremy Kyle Show	(2005–present)
Mock the Week	(2005–present)
Pocoyo	(2005–present)
Springwatch	(2005–present)
2006
The Album Chart Show	(2006–present)
Animal Spies!	(2006–present)
The Apprentice: You're Fired!	(2006–present)
Banged Up Abroad	(2006–present)
Cricket AM	(2006–present)
Dickinson's Real Deal	(2006–present)
Don't Get Done, Get Dom	(2006–present)
Horrid Henry	(2006–present)
Monkey Life	(2006–present)
Not Going Out	(2006–present)
The One Show	(2006–present)
People & Power	(2006–present)
Peschardt's People	(2006–present)
The Secret Millionaire	(2006–2008, 2010–present)
2007
Britain's Got Talent	(2007–present)
Would I Lie to You?	(2007–present)
Benidorm	(2007–present)
The Big Questions	(2007–present)
Don't Tell the Bride	(2007–present)
The Graham Norton Show	(2007–present)
Heir Hunters	(2007–present)
Helicopter Heroes	(2007–present)
London Ink	(2007–present)
Shaun the Sheep	(2007–present)
Real Rescues	(2007–present)
The Hot Desk	(2007–present)
2008
An Là	(2008–present)
Big & Small	(2008–present)
Celebrity Juice	(2008–present)
Chuggington	(2008–present)
Only Connect	(2008–present)
Put Your Money Where Your Mouth Is	(2008–present)
Police Interceptors	(2008–present)
Rubbernecker	(2008–present)
Seachd Là	(2008–present)
2009
Pointless	(2009–present)
The Chase	(2009–present)
The Cube	(2009–present)
Alan Carr: Chatty Man	(2009–present)
Countrywise	(2009–present)
Cowboy Trap	(2009–present)
Four Weddings	(2009–present)
Piers Morgan's Life Stories	(2009–present)
Rip Off Britain	(2009–present)

=== 2010s ===
Programme	Date
2010
Dinner Date	(2010–present)
The Great British Bake Off	(2010–present)
Great British Railway Journeys	(2010–present)
A League of Their Own	(2010–present)
Little Crackers	(2010–present)
Lorraine	(2010–present)
Luther	(2010–present)
The Only Way Is Essex	(2010–present)
Sherlock	(2010–present)
Sunday Morning Live	(2010–present)
Take Me Out	(2010–2020)
2011
All Over the Place	(2011–present)
The Amazing World of Gumball	(2011–present)
Black Mirror	(2011–present)
Four Rooms	(2011–present)
Horrible Histories: Gory Games	(2011–2018)
Junior Bake Off	(2011–present)
Made in Chelsea	(2011–present)
Match of the Day Kickabout	(2011–present)
Sam & Mark's Big Friday Wind-Up	(2011–present)
Show Me What You're Made Of	(2011–present)
Sun, Sex and Suspicious Parents	(2011–present)
Trollied	(2011–2018)
Vera	(2011–2025)
2012
4 O'Clock Club	(2012–present)
Endeavour	(2012–present)
Call the Midwife	(2012–present)
Great Continental Railway Journeys	(2012–present)
Prisoners' Wives	(2012–present)
The Syndicate	(2012–present)
Stella	(2012–present)
Stand Up To Cancer	(2012–present)
The Voice UK	(2012–present)
Tipping Point	(2012–present)
Naomi's Nightmares of Nature	(2012–present)
Paul O'Grady: For the Love of Dogs	(2012–2023)
Operation Ouch!	(2012–present)
Claimed and Shamed	(2012–present)
2013
The Dumping Ground	(2013–present)
Dani's Castle	(2013–present)
Absolute Genius with Dick and Dom	(2013–present)
Caught Red Handed	(2013–present)
Officially Amazing	(2013–present)
Shetland	(2013–present)
Big Star's Little Star	(2013–2018)
The Dog Rescuers	(2013–present)
Still Open All Hours	(2013–present)
Two Doors Down	(2013, 2016–present)
2014
Agatha Raisin	(2014–present)
Boomers	(2014–present)
The Dog Ate My Homework	(2014–present)
The Jump	(2014–present)
The Great Interior Design Challenge	(2014–present)
The Great British Bake Off: An Extra Slice	(2014–present)
Happy Valley	(2014–present)
Holiday of My Lifetime	(2014, 2016–present)
Tyger Takes On...	(2014–present)
Educating Joey Essex	(2014–present)
In the Club	(2014–present)
Chasing Shadows	(2014–present)
Judge Rinder	(2014–present)
Grantchester	(2014–present)
Paul O'Grady's Animal Orphans	(2014–present)
Collage and Service: Meets G & G1	(2014–present)
Weekend Escapes with Warwick Davis	(2014–present)
Scrambled!	(2014–present)
Who's Doing the Dishes?	(2014–present)
24 Hours in Police Custody	(2014–present)
GPs: Behind Closed Doors	(2014–present)
2015
The Almost Impossible Gameshow	(2015–present)
The Dengineers	(2015–present)
Doctor Foster	(2015–present)
The Frankenstein Chronicles	(2015–present)
Hetty Feather	(2015–present)
Hive Minds	(2015–present)
Hoff the Record	(2015–present)
Hunted	(2015–present)
In Therapy	(2015–present)
Jeremy Kyle Emergency Room	(2015–present)
The Kyle Files	(2015–present)
Michael McIntyre's Big Show	(2015–present)
Ninja Warrior UK	(2015–present)
Nightmare Tenants, Slum Landlords	(2015–present)
No Offence	(2015–present)
Poldark	(2015–present)
Real Stories with Ranvir Singh	(2015–present)
Rebound	(2015–present)
Safe House	(2015–present)
SAS: Who Dares Wins	(2015–present)
The Saturday Show	(2015–present)
Scream Street	(2015–present)
Simply Nigella	(2015–present)
So Awkward	(2015–present)
Special Forces: Ultimate Hell Week	(2015–present)
Taskmaster	(2015–present)
Thunderbirds Are Go	(2015–present)
Victoria Derbyshire	(2015–present)
Wild & Weird	(2015–present)
10,000 BC	(2015–present)
Eat Well for Less?	(2015–present)
The Last Kingdom	(2015–2022)
2016
The A Word	(2016–present)
All Over the Workplace	(2016–present)
Bake Off: The Professionals	(2016–present)
Borderline	(2016–present)
Class Dismissed	(2016–present)
The Crown	(2016–present)
The Cruise	(2016–present)
Dara O Briain's Go 8 Bit	(2016–2018)
The Durrells	(2016–2019)
Got What It Takes?	(2016–present)
Insert Name Here	(2016–present)
The Level	(2016–present)
Marcella	(2016–present)
Masterpiece	(2016–present)
Mum	(2016–2019)
Naked Attraction	(2016–present)
No Such Thing as the News	(2016–present)
Peter Kay's Comedy Shuffle	(2016–present)
Peston on Sunday	(2016–2018)
The Premier League Show	(2016–present)
Spot Bots	(2016–present)
Stan Lee's Lucky Man	(2016–2018)
Tenable	(2016–2024)
This Time Next Year	(2016–2019)
Top Class	(2016–present)
Unspun with Matt Forde	(2016–present)
Upstart Crow	(2016–present)
Victoria	(2016–2019)
The Windsors	(2016–2023)
Witless	(2016–2018)
Zapped	(2016–2018)
2017
Beyond 100 Days	(2017–present)
Dennis & Gnasher: Unleashed!	(2017–present)
Free Rein	(2017–2019)
Paddington Station 24/7	(2017–present)
Lego Masters	(2017–present)
Love Island: Aftersun	(2017–present)
Strike	(2017–present)
Harry Hill's Alien Fun Capsule	(2017–present)
Reported Missing	(2017–present)

== Ending this year ==
Date(s)	Programme	Channel(s)	Debut(s)
7 January	Robot Wars	BBC Two, BBC Choice, Channel 5	1997 & 2016
10 January	Witless	BBC Three	2016
18 January	The Tunnel	Sky Atlantic	2013
26 January	Horrible Histories: Gory Games	CBBC	2011
31 January	Partners in Rhyme	BBC One	2018
10 February	Hard Sun	BBC One	2018
15 February	Generation Gifted	BBC Two	2018
17 February	And They're Off!	BBC One	2018
20 February	Flatpack Empire	BBC Two	2018
5 March	Collateral	BBC Two	2018
15 March	The Ruth Ellis Files: A Very British Crime Story	BBC Four	2018
16 March	Requiem	BBC One	2018
21 March	Damned	Channel 4	2016
6 April	Room 101	BBC Two, BBC One	1994 & 2012
7 April	Lip Sync Battle UK	Channel 5	2016
7 April	Troy: Fall of a City	BBC One	2018
12 April	Indian Summer School	Channel 4	2018
15 April	Ordeal by Innocence	BBC One	2018
16 April	Dara O Briain's Go 8 Bit	Dave	2016
27 April	The City and the City	BBC Two	2018
29 April	Britain's Biggest Warship	BBC Two	2018
2 May	Benidorm	ITV	2007
6 May	Football on 5	Channel 5	1997 & 2015
7 May	The Woman in White	BBC One	2018
9 May	Fireman Sam	S4C / CBeebies / Channel 5	1987
11 May	Episodes	BBC Two	2011
17 May	Innocent	ITV	2018
27 May	Little Big Shots	ITV	2017
27 May	Peston on Sunday	ITV	2016
28 May	Peter Kay's Car Share	BBC One	2015
3 June	A Very English Scandal	BBC One	2018
10 June	Patrick Melrose	Sky Atlantic	2018
10 June	Top of the Box	Channel 5	2018
28 June	The Late Show with Ewen Cameron	STV2	2016
29 June	Live at Five	STV2	2016
5 July	Humans	Channel 4	2015
22 July	Sunday Politics	BBC One	2012
24 July	Daily Politics	BBC Two	2003
1 August	Animals Behaving Badly	BBC One	2018
31 August	The Wright Stuff	Channel 5	2000
1 September	Big Star's Little Star	ITV	2013
7 September	Stan Lee's Lucky Man	Sky One	2016
10 September	Celebrity Big Brother	Channel 4, Channel 5	2001
7 October	Vanity Fair	ITV	2018
11 October	Press	BBC One	2018
12 October	Chase the Case	BBC One	2018
12 October	Teletubbies	CBeebies	1997, 2007, 2012 & 2015
28 October	Mediterranean with Simon Reeve	BBC Two	2018
28 October	Last Chance Lawyer NYC	BBC Two	2018
5 November	Big Brother	Channel 4, Channel 5	2000
15 November	Children in Need Rocks	BBC One	2009
20 November	Informer	BBC One	2018
21 November	Zapped	Dave	2016
2 December	The Little Drummer Girl	BBC One	2018
2 December	The X Factor	ITV	2004
6 December	Sally4Ever	Sky Atlantic	2018
11 December	Mrs Wilson	BBC One	2018
12 December	Death and Nightingales	BBC Two	2018
12 December	Millie Inbetween	CBBC	2014
13 December	Esther Rantzen's House Trap	Channel 5	2018
17 December	People Just Do Nothing	BBC Three, BBC Two	2012
20 December	The Long Song	BBC One	2018
23 December	Watership Down	BBC One	2018
23 December	Trollied	Sky One	2011
28 December	The ABC Murders	BBC One	2018
30 December	Big Star's Bigger Star	ITV	2015

== Deaths ==
Date	Name	Age	Broadcast credibility
8 January	David Sherwin	75	Screenwriter (If...., O Lucky Man!, Britannia Hospital)
9 January	Terence Marsh	86	Production designer (Doctor Zhivago, Oliver!, The Shawshank Redemption)
10 January	David Fisher	88	Television writer (Doctor Who, Dixon of Dock Green, Hammer House of Horror)
12 January	Bella Emberg	80	Actress (The Russ Abbot Show, Bear Behaving Badly)
15 January	Peter Wyngarde	90	Actor (Department S, Jason King, Flash Gordon)
17 January	Simon Shelton	52	Actor (Teletubbies, Incredible Games)
20 January	Howard Lew Lewis	76	Comedian and actor (Brush Strokes, Maid Marian and Her Merry Men, Chelmsford 123)
26 January	Stacey Young	52	Model and actress (wife of Paul Young)
4 February	Kenneth Haigh	86	Actor (Man at the Top, Cleopatra, Eagle in a Cage)
21 February	Emma Chambers	53	Actress (The Vicar of Dibley, Notting Hill, Martin Chuzzlewit, The Bill)
23 February	Lewis Gilbert	97	Film director (You Only Live Twice, Alfie, Educating Rita)
27 February	Peter Miles	89	Actor (Z-Cars, Doctor Who, Blake's 7)
1 March	Colin Campbell	81	Actor (A Family at War, The Leather Boys, The Ruth Rendell Mysteries)
4 March	Carmel McSharry	91	Actress (Beryl's Lot, In Sickness and in Health, Oliver Twist)
6 March	Zena Skinner	91	Television chef
11 March	Ken Dodd	90	Comedian, singer-songwriter, actor, creator of The Diddy Men
14 March	Jim Bowen	80	Television presenter (Bullseye) and comedian (The Comedians)
20 March	Katie Boyle	91	Model, broadcaster and advice columnist
30 March	Bill Maynard	89	Actor (Heartbeat, Oh No, It's Selwyn Froggitt!, Carry On) aka Claude Greengrass
12 April	Alex Beckett	35	Actor (Twenty Twelve, W1A, Youth)
12 April	Ronald Chesney	97	Comedy writer (On the Buses, The Rag Trade, Romany Jones)
15 April	Neil Shand	84	Comedy writer (Q..., The Russ Abbot Show)
18 April	Dale Winton	62	Television presenter (Dale's Supermarket Sweep, In It to Win It)
25 April	Michael Anderson	98	Film director (The Dam Busters, Around the World in 80 Days, Logan's Run)
25 April	Edith MacArthur	92	Actress (Take the High Road)
14 May	Peter Byrne	90	Actor and director (Dixon of Dock Green, Bread, Carry On Cabby)
23 May	Glynn Edwards	87	Actor (Minder, Get Carter, The Paper Lads)
6 June	Teddy Johnson	98	Singer (Pearl Carr & Teddy Johnson) and UK Eurovision contestant (1959)
8 June	Eunice Gayson	90	Actress (Sylvia Trench in the James Bond film series, and the first Bond girl)
14 June	Yvonne Gilan	86	Actress (Fawlty Towers, Chariots of Fire, Empire of the Sun)
15 June	Leslie Grantham	71	Actor (EastEnders, The Paradise Club, Fort Boyard)
20 June	Sophie Gradon	32	Model and television personality (Love Island)
29 June	Helen Griffin	59	Actress (Twin Town, Doctor Who)
1 July	Peter Firmin	89	Television producer (Bagpuss, Noggin the Nog, Clangers)
12 July	Annabelle Neilson	49	Socialite, fashion model, author, and television personality (Ladies of London)
25 July	Carolyn Jones	77	Actress (Crossroads)
26 July	Alastair Yates	65	Newsreader (BBC News, Sky News, About Anglia)
27 July	Alan Bennion	88	Actor (Doctor Who, Z-Cars)
27 July	Bernard Hepton	92	Actor (Colditz, I, Claudius, Secret Army)
5 August	Barry Chuckle	73	Entertainer (ChuckleVision) and half of the Chuckle Brothers
6 August	Pete Richens	65	Screenwriter (The Comic Strip Presents)
15 August	Simone Kerr	31	Singer and nurse (Britain's Got Talent contestant as member of B Positive Choir)
25 August	Lindsay Kemp	80	Dancer, choreographer (Ziggy Stardust) and actress (The Wicker Man, Valentino)
31 August	Carole Shelley	79	Actress (The Odd Couple, Carry On Cabby, Robin Hood)
3 September	Jacqueline Pearce	74	Actress (Blake's 7, Dark Season, Doctor Who)
5 September	Rachael Bland	40	Journalist, newsreader and presenter (BBC North West Tonight)
6 September	Peter Benson	75	Actor (Heartbeat, The Black Adder, Albion Market)
6 September	Liz Fraser	88	Actress (I'm All Right Jack, Carry On Regardless, Dad's Army)
6 September	Johnny Kingdom	79	Wildlife filmmaker and presenter (Johnny's New Kingdom)
7 September	Sheila White	69	Actress (Oliver!, Dear Mother...Love Albert, Unidentified Flying Oddball, EastEnders)
11 September	Fenella Fielding	90	Actress (Follow a Star, Carry On Regardless, Carry On Screaming!)
14 September	Zienia Merton	72	Actress (The Chairman, Doctor Who, Space: 1999)
15 September	Dudley Sutton	85	Actor (The Leather Boys, The Devils, Lovejoy, Emmerdale)
19 September	Denis Norden	96	Comedy writer (Take It from Here) and television presenter (It'll Be Alright on the Night)
20 September	John Cunliffe	85	Writer and television presenter (Postman Pat, Rosie and Jim)
22 September	Chas Hodges	74	Singer and musician (Chas & Dave, composer of Crackerjack!)
27 September	Ernest Maxin	95	Television producer (Morecambe and Wise)
30 September	Geoffrey Hayes	76	Television presenter (Rainbow) and actor (Z-Cars)
5 October	Ray Galton	88	Comedy writer (Steptoe and Son, Hancock's Half Hour)
9 October	Pat Gorman	85	Actor (Doctor Who, The Nightmare Man)
14 October	Peter Brackley	67	Commentator (Football Italia)
17 October	Derrick Sherwin	82	Television producer (Doctor Who, Paul Temple)
6 November	Janice Willett	86	Television producer with ABC Weekend TV
15 November	John Bluthal	89	Actor (Never Mind the Quality, Feel the Width, The Vicar of Dibley, Hail, Caesar!)
15 November	Anne Carroll	78	Actress (Bellman and True, Coldblooded, K-PAX)
15 November	Jane Wenham	90	Actress (An Inspector Calls, Testament of Youth)
16 November	Andrew Burt	73	Actor (Emmerdale, The Legend of King Arthur, Campion) aka original Jack Sugden
16 November	George A. Cooper	93	Actor (Tom Jones, Coronation Street, Grange Hill)
16 November	Jeanne Mockford	92	Actress (Up Pompeii!, Fourplay, Hellboy II: The Golden Army)
17 November	Richard Baker	93	Newsreader (BBC News, Start the Week, Melodies for You)
18 November	Jennie Stoller	72	Actress (The Good Father, Sapphire & Steel, King Ralph)
20 November	Robert Blythe	71	Actor (Whoops Apocalypse, Rebecca's Daughters, There Be Dragons)
23 November	Nicolas Roeg	90	Film director and cinematographer (Don't Look Now, The Man Who Fell to Earth)
30 November	Peter Armitage	79	Actor (Coronation Street, Jack the Ripper, Hearts and Minds aka Bill Webster)
6 December	Thomas Baptiste	89	Actor (Coronation Street, Sunday Bloody Sunday, EastEnders)
19 December	Bill Sellars	93	Television producer and director (Doctor Who, All Creatures Great and Small, Triangle)
29 December	Dame June Whitfield	93	Actress (Absolutely Fabulous, Terry and June, Last of the Summer Wine, Carry On... films, EastEnders)

== See also ==
- 2018 in British music
- 2018 in British radio
- 2018 in the United Kingdom
- List of British films of 2018
