= List of television documentaries about British public schools =

There is an established genre of 'Fly on the wall' television documentaries about schools including British public schools.

== Documentaries ==
- 1967: Eton, a documentary produced by Anthony de Lotbiniere, narrated by René Cutforth, broadcast on BBC TV.
- 1979: Edward Mirzoeff produced the BBC documentary entitled Public School about Westminster School, including footage of John Rae.
- 1980: Richard Denton produced a ten part documentary about Radley College also entitled Public School, which ran on BBC2, including footage of Dennis Silk.
- 1981: The Gentleman Factory about Eton College, directed by Simon Dewhurst was shown on BBC1.
- 1991: Eton – Class of '91, a Channel 4 documentary about Eton College directed by Simon Shore.
- 1995: Inside Eton by Howard Guard, narrated by Charles Dance.
- 1996: True Stories: Gordonstoun directed by Penny Woolcock.
- 2001: Harrow:The School on the Hill, featuring Barnaby Lenon, narrated by Aden Gillett, broadcast by ITV (Carlton).
- 2003: Ampleforth: My Teacher's a Monk, broadcast on ITV1, narrated by Alex Jennings,
- 2008: Pride and Privilege: A Year in the Life of Glenalmond College, a three part series broadcast on BBC2 Scotland produced and directed by Stephen Bennett.
- 2008: My New Best Friend about Cheltenham Ladies College, directed by Jo Abel and broadcast on BBC4.
- 2011: Posh and Posher: Why Public School Boys Run Britain, produced by Matthew Laza and presented by Andrew Neil, broadcast on BBC2.
- 2013: Hannah Berryman's BBC documentary with alternative titles of A Very English Education and Boarding School: Boys to Men, a follow-up on the pupils who featured in the 1980 documentary about Radley College.
- 2013: Harrow: A Very British School, broadcast on Sky1.
- 2014: The Most Famous School in the World, a BBC documentary about Eton College, produced by Maggie Liang and Sarah Murch as part of the My Life series for children.
- 2015: Gordonstoun: A Different Class, a six-episode series broadcast on Sky1.
