= Generation Gifted =

British documentary television series

- Also known as: Gifted, Growing Up Gifted
- Directed by: Luke Sewell; Marcus Plowright; Brent Gundesen; Jack MacInnes
- Narrated by: Maxine Peake
- No. of episodes: 6

Production
- Executive producers: Sacha Baveystock; Edmund Coulthard; David Hodgkinson
- Producer: Zehra Yas
- Editors: Steve Barclay; Michael Harte; Audinga Kucinskaite
- Running time: 60 minutes
- Production company: Blast! Films

Original release
- Network: BBC Two; BBC Two HD
- Release: February 14, 2018 – April 1, 2020

Generation Gifted is a British documentary television series that was first broadcast on BBC Two between 14 and 15 February 2018. The six-part series takes a unique look at social mobility and the factors which affect it in Britain today, by filming with six highly promising children, who are all from families on low incomes. Transmitting two 60 minute episodes each year from 2018, the series will explore the "challenges facing these children, as they progress from ages 13 to 16 and sit their GCSEs. Whether they’re talented mathematicians, show a flair for literature or are flourishing artists, these kids all have the potential to go far".

== Production ==
The series was commissioned by Patrick Holland, Channel Controller, BBC Two, Clare Sillery, Head of Commissioning, Documentaries, and Danny Horan, Commissioning Editor for Documentaries.

== Episodes ==
=== Series 1 ===
==== Episode 1 : Girls ====
Original air date: 14 February 2018

In Port Talbot, Anne-Marie wants to go to university but has anxiety. In Tamworth, talented artist Shakira is pushed to find her creative voice. Financial problems may harm Jada's hopes.

==== Episode 2: Boys ====
Original air date: 15 February 2018

We meet three 13-year-old boys facing many uncertainties. In the North-East Kian and Liam both struggle under the weight of expectations. In London, Jamarley's future is hindered by problems at home.

=== Series 2 ===
==== Episode 3: Boys ====
Original air date: 18 February 2019

==== Episode 4: Girls ====
Original air date: 25 February 2019

=== Series 3 ===
==== Episode 3: Boys ====
Original air date: 25 March 2020

==== Episode 4: Girls ====
Original air date: 1 April 2020

== See also ==
- Educating (TV series)
- Our School (TV series)
- Undercover Teacher
- Harrow: A Very British School
