= Britta Teckentrup =

German children's book author and illustrator

Britta Teckentrup is a German artist. She is primarily known as a children's book author and illustrator, having published more than 70 titles, which have been published in more than 20 countries.

== Early life and education ==
Teckentrup was born in Hamburg, Germany, and raised in Wuppertal. In 1988, she moved London to study at St Martin's College and the Royal College of Art.

== Career ==
Teckentrup has published more than 70 books, most of which are children's books, which she both authors and illustrates. She is well-known for her book The Memory Tree.

She did not set out to become a children's book illustrator; instead, she had a children's book publisher approach her at her degree show and invite her to illustrate books.

Her illustrations include paint, cut paper, and digital collage. In her early career, she worked exclusively by cutting paper with nail scissors. In later work, she starts with physical paper, then scans them in and uses layers and textures in Photoshop. Many of her books include cut-outs or peepholes.

Her work has been featured in numerous exhibitions, art fairs, and workshops worldwide. She has received numerous awards for her work.

== Personal life ==
Teckentrup lived in England for many years, but now lives in Berlin, Germany, with her husband, son, and cat.
