= That Night =

That Night may refer to:

- That Night!, a 1957 film directed by John Newland
- That Night (1958 film), a French crime drama film
- That Night (novel), a 1987 novel by Alice McDermott
- That Night (1992 film), a film directed by Craig Bolotin
- "That Night" (song), a 2019 song by Carousel that represented Latvia in the Eurovision Song Contest 2019
- That Night (TV series), a 2021 South Korean television series based on Criminal Justice
- That Night (2025 film), a short animated documentary film by Hoda Sobhani, about experiences of political prisoners of the Iranian government
