= Chase the Case =

2018 British game show

- Genre: Game show
- Created by: Lynsey Wylie
- Directed by: John Adams
- Presented by: Dan Walker
- Starring: Deborah Anderson (as security guard)
- Composer: Marc Sylvan
- Country of origin: United Kingdom
- Original language: English
- No. of series: 1
- No. of episodes: 20

Production
- Running time: 45 minutes
- Production company: Bandicoot

Original release
- Network: BBC One
- Release: 17 September – 12 October 2018

Chase the Case is a British television game show created by Lynsey Wylie and produced by Bandicoot Productions for BBC One; it premiered on 17 September 2018. Hosted by Dan Walker, the show features five contestants who compete to win money hidden in briefcases by answering questions and eliminating one another from the game. The show also features Deborah Anderson as a security guard who handles the cases.

In 2019, it was reported that Chase the Case was cancelled after just one series.

== Format ==
Cash amounts of £0, £100, £500, £1,000 and £5,000 are hidden in five briefcases, each of which is given to a different contestant at the start of the game.

=== Rounds 1–4: Reconnaissance Rounds ===
The host states a category at the start of each round, then asks a series of questions on the buzzer. The first two contestants to give three correct answers are allowed to make separate visits to a soundproof vault, in which the host reveals information about one opponent's case of the contestant's choosing. The first contestant can either see the amount in the chosen opponent's case or learn whether it is higher or lower than their own amount; the second contestant receives the option not taken by the first. At no time will a contestant be told the amount in their own case.

=== Final ===
The contestants stand at the beginning of a four-step path, and the host asks general-knowledge questions on the buzzer. A correct answer allows a contestant to move one step ahead, while a miss freezes them out of the next question. Every step after the first is marked red to indicate it as a "steal zone." When a contestant moves onto a steal zone, they may challenge one opponent if they wish or keep their own case and continue the game normally.

A challenge consists of four questions, alternating between the two contestants and starting with the challenged opponent. Either contestant can win by answering more of their own questions correctly than the other. If the opponent wins, all cases stay with their holders. If the challenger wins, they take control of the opponent's case and the opponent is eliminated from the game with no winnings. The case originally held by the challenger is removed from play and opened to reveal its value. If the score is tied after all four questions have been asked, a tiebreaker is played on the buzzer. Once a challenge is resolved, the buzzer questions resume.

The first contestant to answer a total of five buzzer questions correctly, or the last one remaining in the event of four challenge eliminations, wins the game and receives whatever money is in their case.

== Transmissions ==
=== Regular series ===
Series	Start date	End date	Episodes
1	17 September 2018	12 October 2018	20
