= Lee and Dean =

- Genre: Sitcom
- Written by: Miles Chapman; Mark O'Sullivan; Sam Underwood
- Directed by: Mark O'Sullivan
- Starring: Miles Chapman; Mark O'Sullivan
- Country of origin: United Kingdom
- Original language: English
- No. of series: 2
- No. of episodes: 11

Production
- Cinematography: Alistair Upcraft
- Editors: Jamie Harris; Sam Underwood
- Camera setup: Multi-camera
- Running time: 30 minutes
- Production company: Bingo Productions

Original release
- Network: Channel 4
- Release: 30 March 2018 – 16 May 2019

Lee and Dean is a British sitcom following the lives of two Stevenage builders who were childhood friends. Written by Mark O'Sullivan (Dean) and Miles Chapman (Lee) and Sam Underwood (Little Dean) it was originally broadcast on Channel 4 between 30 March 2018 and 16 May 2019. The carpenter and electrician jointly own Lee Dean Construction Solutions, operating a business model to attempt any kind of work and undercut their high-end competitors. They also spend their free time together pursuing a shared hobby of bark rubbing and brass rubbing. Lee, who is outgoing and confident, has a new girlfriend called Nikki and an ongoing liaison with Mrs Bryce-D'Souza, a wealthy client. Dean is caring but acutely awkward in social situations and can only fully express himself through his poetry. It is obvious that Dean loves Lee.

== Genre ==
Lee and Dean is written in a docusoap style of reality TV, incorporating footage of unscripted situations and individual interviews in which the major characters provide context for those events.

== Cast ==
Actor(s)	Character
Miles Chapman	Lee
Mark O'Sullivan	Dean
Anna Morris	Pippa Bryce-D'Souza
Camille Ucan	Nikki
Sam Underwood	Little Dean

== Critical reception ==
The series has been admired by critics. "Beyond the boysy banter, the filth and the squirming, there’s genuine human tragedy. You’re as likely to cry as you are to laugh", Sam Wollaston wrote in The Guardian. In The Telegraph, Rupert Hawksley called it "...so salty it should come with a health warning", continuing "I'm ashamed to admit that I laughed a lot – though it seems I'm in good company". Both awarded it four out of five stars.
