= Flatpack Empire =

- Also known as: Flatpack: The World’s Biggest Furniture Store
- Genre: Documentary
- Directed by: Rob Farquhar
- Narrated by: Olivia Colman
- Original language: English
- No. of seasons: 1
- No. of episodes: 3

Production
- Executive producers: Tom Barry; Liesel Evans; Tim Wardle
- Producer: Tom Swingler
- Running time: 60 minutes
- Production company: Raw TV

Original release
- Network: BBC Two; BBC Two HD
- Release: 6 February – 20 February 2018

Flatpack Empire is a British documentary television series that was first broadcast on BBC Two between 6 and 20 February 2018. The three-part series goes behind the scenes of the world's largest and best-known furniture retailer, IKEA with narrator Olivia Colman.

== Production ==
The series was commissioned by Patrick Holland, Controller, BBC Two, and Jamie Balment, Commissioning Editor, BBC Documentaries. The series was produced in partnership with the Open University.

The series explores the "distinctly Swedish philosophy behind the company’s extraordinary cultural influence and commercial success".

== Critical reception ==
The Daily Telegraph described the documentary as "gloomy" and The Guardian described the culture shown in IKEA as "less like a furniture shop and more like a flatpack cult".
