= Johnny Kingdom =

English television presenter (1939–2018)

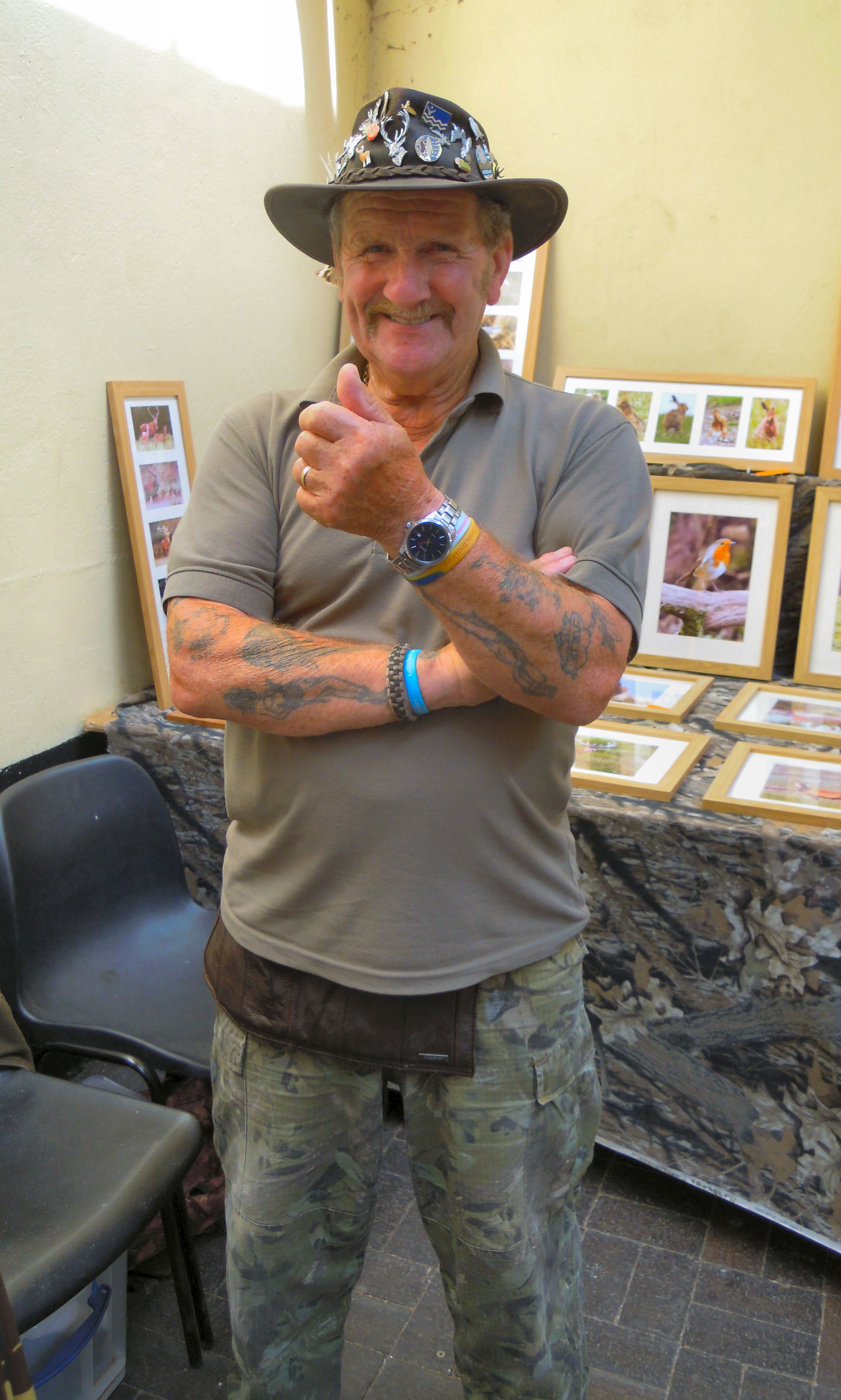
- Johnny Kingdom at Barnstaple Pannier Market in August 2018
- Born: Walter John Kingdon; 23 February 1939; High Bray, North Devon, England
- Died: 6 September 2018 (aged 79); Knowstone, North Devon, England
- Known for: Filmmaking; Photography
- Style: Wildlife

Walter John Kingdon (23 February 1939 – 6 September 2018), known as Johnny Kingdom, was an English wildlife filmmaker and photographer specialising in his local area of Exmoor in north Devon and west Somerset.

== Early life ==
Before finding fame, Kingdom worked as an explosives expert, lumberjack, farmhand, quarryman, poacher and for over 50 years the gravedigger for his local parish.

== Media career ==
Following a head injury sustained while driving a tractor in his job as a lumberjack, Kingdom spent some time convalescing and developed depression. To aid in his recovery, a friend lent him a video camera and suggested he film wildlife on Exmoor. This led to a career spanning 20 years, with series and documentaries being shown on a number of British television channels.

His 2006 series Johnny Kingdom: A Year on Exmoor was shown on BBC Two. The series coincided with the publication of his autobiography, Johnny Kingdom - A Wild Life on Exmoor. A follow-up series, Johnny's New Kingdom, documenting his project to create a wildlife haven on a 55-acre (22-hectare) plot of land which he had purchased on Exmoor, was shown on BBC Two in 2008. Kingdom has also made several one-off programmes, including visits to Lapland and to the Scottish Highlands. In 2015 he presented a four-part series for ITV called Johnny Kingdom's Wild Exmoor.

In later years he regularly had a stall at Barnstaple Pannier Market from which he sold signed copies of his books, DVDs and photographs of wildlife.

== Death ==
Kingdom died in September 2018 from injuries sustained in a digger accident on his land near Knowstone in North Devon. He was buried at St Mary's Parish Church, Bishop's Nympton, in a grave that he had dug.
