= CBBC Summer Social =

British children's outdoor festival organised by CBBC

- Status: Inactive
- Dates: 3–4/5 August 2018; 3–4 August 2019
- Locations: Croxteth Hall, Liverpool
- Years active: 2018–2019
- Founders: CBBC

The CBBC Summer Social was an outdoor festival organised by the British children's television channel CBBC, aimed at children, which took place on the weekend of 3–4/5 August 2018. The festival was held at Croxteth Hall, Liverpool, and includes performances from performers such as Union J, HRVY, Mackenzie Ziegler and Matt Terry. Plans for the festival in 2018, the first of its kind organised by the BBC, were revealed on 27 March 2018, with the venue and some of the acts scheduled to appear announced on that day.

A second Summer Social event was held from 3 to 4 August 2019. Summer Social did not take place in 2020 due to the COVID-19 pandemic. No future Summer Social events have been announced as of 2024.
