= Johnny's New Kingdom =

2008 British television series

Johnny's New Kingdom is a British television series presented by wildlife cameraman Johnny Kingdom. 10 episodes were first shown on BBC Two in March and April 2008.
