= Harrow: A Very British School =

British documentary series

Harrow: A Very British School is an 8-part documentary series broadcast in the United Kingdom on Sky1. The series was a fly-on-the-wall look behind the doors of Harrow School and followed a group of students from West Acre House.
