= Reading Law: The Interpretation of Legal Texts =

Book by Antonin Scalia and Bryan A. Garner

- Author: Antonin Scalia and Bryan A. Garner
- Subject: Legal principles and canons for interpreting texts
- Publisher: Thomson West
- Publication date: 2012
- Pages: 567
- ISBN: 978-0-314-27555-4

Reading Law: The Interpretation of Legal Texts is a 2012 book by United States Supreme Court Justice Antonin Scalia and lexicographer Bryan A. Garner. Following a foreword written by Frank Easterbrook, then Chief Judge of the US Court of Appeals for the Seventh Circuit, Scalia and Garner present textualist principles and canons applicable to the analysis of all legal texts, following by approaches specific to the interpretation of government statutes. Finally, Scalia and Garner present "Thirteen Falsities Exposed," mostly focused on attacking the philosophy of a Living Constitution, in which the interpretation of legal texts evolves alongside public attitudes.

== Premise ==
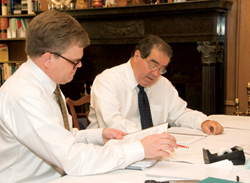
Garner and Scalia working on their previous book, Making Your Case: The Art of Persuading Judges

In Scalia and Garner's view, the United States' legal system has shifted away from the common law of judicial precedent being the primary mechanism of law-making toward the civil law of statutes passed by Congress.

Despite Scalia's advocacy for originalism in interpreting the US Constitution, he argues that determining legislative intent for other legal texts is impossible because every statute is the product of compromise between many legislators, so aggregating their viewpoints is an impractical approach to statutory interpretation.

In the book's introduction, Scalia and Garner focus on the 1986 Supreme Court case United States v. James, which expansively interpreted the 1928 Flood Control Act's exclusion to the Federal Tort Claims Act's waiver of sovereign immunity. Disagreeing with the Supreme Court's definition of "damage" as including injury to people, rather than solely limited to injuries to their property, Scalia and Garner argue that using irregular definitions in statutory interpretation creates uncertainty in the legal system.

== Criticisms ==
Writing for Slate, Scott Korb criticized Garner for retreating from the linguistic descriptivism showcased in Garner's Modern English Usage dictionary in favor of textualist interpretations of legal texts that adhere to rigid definitions. Furthermore, Korb disagreed with Scalia and Garner's claim that upholding an unstated right to privacy via the Fourteenth Amendment destabilizes the United States' legal system. Whereas Scalia and Garner argue that the Supreme Court's verdicts in Roe v. Wade (identified a right to abortion until overturned by Dobbs v. Jackson Women's Health Organization in 2022) and Lawrence v. Texas (invalidated anti-sodomy laws) assigned too much power to unelected judges, Korb noted that both positions in each case were controversial at the time of the ruling.

In his review for the Journal of Civil Law Studies, law professor James Maxeiner argued that Scalia's advocacy for textualism modeled after the German legal system's approach to civil law represents a reversal from Scalia's Supreme Court jurisprudence largely dismissing foreign and international law.

In law professor David F. Forte's review for the Claremont Review of Books, he claimed that Scalia and Garner erred in discarding legal maxims like "no man may profit from his own wrong" because a strict adherence to textualism would lead to absurd judicial outcomes, regardless of whether this approach would ultimately motivate elected legislators to clarify their statutes.

As part of a 2014 micro-symposium hosted by Saint Louis University School of Law, dozens of law professors submitted short essays reviewing the book. Among the reviews, Brian S. Clarke highlighted that in the 2014 Supreme Court case Burrage v. United States, Scalia's citations to prior decisions substituted the article "the" with "a," violating the book's emphasis on the legal text's original grammar. Similarly, Jordan T. Smith faulted Scalia and Garner for introducing a "nearest reasonable referent canon," rather than curating the existing approaches to textualism.

Seventh Circuit Judge Richard Posner's review for The New Republic harshly criticized the book as pretending to offer an objective approach to statutory analysis when Scalia's prior Supreme Court decisions had showcased a willingness to disregard dictionary definitions and surrounding text to decide cases in favor of the conservative position. Furthermore, Posner framed a reliance on dictionary definitions as intellectually lazy, given that lexicographers cannot predict the unique cases of statutory interpretation that judges will be faced with. In response to Posner's scathing comments, Garner contracted lawyer Steven A. Hirsch to propose changes for the book's second edition, such as clarifying that many of the cases positively cited by the book had been decided using multiple judicial philosophies, rather than solely relying on textualism.
