= Cramton =

Cramton is a surname. Notable people with the surname include:

- Louis C. Cramton (1875–1966), American politician
- Roger C. Cramton (1929–2017), American legal scholar
