= Administrative Law, Process and Procedure Project =

The Administrative Law, Process and Procedure Project (the Project) is a bipartisan undertaking of the Committee on the Judiciary of the House of Representatives of the United States Congress. It consists of a comprehensive study of the state of administrative law, process and procedure in the United States. A description of the Project was included in the Judiciary Committee's Oversight Plan for the 109th Congress, as approved by the Committee on January 26, 2005. The Project will culminate with the preparation of a detailed report with recommendations for legislative proposals and suggested areas for further research and analysis to be considered by the Administrative Conference of the United States (ACUS). House Judiciary Committee Chairman F. James Sensenbrenner, Jr. (R-WI) and Ranking Member John Conyers (D-MI) requested the Congressional Research Service (CRS) to assist Representative Chris Cannon (R-UT), the Chairman of the Subcommittee on Commercial and Administrative Law (CAL), in conducting the Project.

== Relationship between the project and ACUS ==
One of the principal goals of the Project is to substantiate further the need to reactivate the Administrative Conference of the United States (ACUS), a nonpartisan "private-public think tank" that proposed valuable recommendations which improved administrative aspects of regulatory law and practice. Over its 28-year existence, ACUS served as an independent agency charged with studying "the efficiency, adequacy, and fairness of the administrative procedure used by administrative agencies in carrying out administrative programs." Most of its approximately 200 recommendations were implemented, and they, in turn, helped save taxpayers many millions of dollars. ACUS was considered to be "an invaluable mechanism set into place by Congress to improve federal administrative law." A commentator observed that "[a]s long as there is a need for regulatory reform, there is a need for something like the Administrative Conference." ACUS is credited with playing an important role in improving the nation's legal system by issuing recommendations designed "to eliminate excessive litigation costs and long delays." For example, Congress, in response to an ACUS recommendation, passed the Administrative Dispute Resolution Act in 1990, which established a framework for agencies to resolve administrative litigation through alternative dispute resolution. Among its "most influential government-wide recommendations" were ACUS's proposals facilitating judicial review of agency decisions and eliminating various technical impediments to such review. It also issued proposals leading to the enactment of the Negotiated Rulemaking Act, which encourages consensual resolution through a process that takes into account the needs of various affected interests. ACUS, in addition, recommended a model administrative civil penalty statute that has served as the basis for "numerous pieces of legislation."

From a systemic perspective, ACUS also helped to focus attention on the need for the federal government to be made more efficient, smaller, and more accountable. It was viewed as one of the leading federal proponents of encouraging practical ways to reduce administrative litigation. In this regard, ACUS actively promoted information-technology initiatives, such as developing methods by which the public could participate electronically in agency rulemaking proceedings to increase public access to government information and foster greater openness in government operations.

During the course of his testimony on the reauthorization of ACUS in 2004, U.S. Supreme Court Justice Antonin Scalia, a former ACUS Chair, described ACUS as “a worthwhile organization” that offered “a unique combination of talents from the academic world, from within the executive branch . . . and, thirdly, from the private bar, especially lawyers particularly familiar with administrative law.” He observed, “I did not know another organization that so effectively combined the best talent from each of those areas.” In addition, he said that the Conference was “an enormous bargain.” Likewise, U.S. Supreme Court Justice Stephen Breyer cited the “huge” savings to the public as a result of ACUS’s recommendations. Noting that ACUS was “a matter of good Government,” he stated, “I very much hope you reauthorize the Administrative Conference.” Both Justices agreed that there were various matters that a reauthorized ACUS could examine. These included assessing the value of having agencies use teleconferencing facilities and the need to create a regulatory process that promotes sound science. Through Representative Cannon's leadership, ACUS was reauthorized in the 108th Congress.

== Current status of the project ==
=== Hearings ===
To date, the CAL Subcommittee has held a series of hearings in anticipation of and as part of the Project. Following its May 20, 2004 oversight hearing on the reauthorization of the ACUS at which Justices Antonin Scalia and Stephen Breyer testified, the Subcommittee conducted a second hearing on ACUS that examined further the reasons why there is a need to reauthorize ACUS. In 2005, the Subcommittee held a hearing on the status of the Project. In 2006, the Subcommittee held a hearing that focused on the Congressional Review Act in light of that Act’s tenth anniversary. Also in 2006, Subcommittee held a hearing on how the Regulatory Flexibility Act has been implemented since its enactment in 1980 and whether proposed legislation, such as H.R. 682, the “Regulatory Flexibility Improvements Act” would adequately address certain perceived weaknesses in the RFA. In the summer of 2006, the CAL Subcommittee held a hearing on the 60th anniversary of the Administrative Procedure Act discussing the question as to if the act is still effective in the 21st century.

=== Symposia ===
In addition to conducting hearings, the CAL Subcommittee to date has cosponsored two symposia as part of the project. The first symposium, held in December 2005, was on Federal E-Government Initiatives. This program, chaired by Professor Cary Coglianese of the University of Pennsylvania Law School, examined the Executive Branch’s efforts to implement e-rulemaking across the federal government. A particular focus of this program was on the ongoing development of a government-wide Federal Docket Management System (FDMS). Presentations at the symposium were given by government managers involved in the development of the FDMS as well as by academic researchers studying e-rulemaking. Representatives from various agencies, including the Office of Management and Budget (OMB), the United States Environmental Protection Agency, and the Government Accountability Office (GAO), discussed the current progress of e-rulemaking. In addition, academics reported on current and prospective research endeavors dealing with certain aspects of e-rulemaking. The program offered a structured dialogue that addressed the challenges and opportunities for implementing e-rulemaking, the outcomes achieved by e-rulemaking to date, and strategies that could be used in the future to improve the rulemaking process through application of information technology.

The second symposium, held at American University, examined the role of science in the rulemaking process. The symposium consisted of four panels: OMB’s recent initiatives on regulatory science, science and the judicial review of rulemaking, science advisory panels and rulemaking, and government agencies’ science capabilities.

=== Ongoing studies ===
==== Study on how Proposed Rules are Developed ====
As part of the Project, several studies are also being conducted. One study, by Professor William West of Texas A&M University, examines the role of public participation before notice and comment. The APA generally requires agencies to involve the public in the rulemaking process by publishing notices of proposed rulemaking to which the public can submit comments. Agencies, after considering these comments, publish final rules. Although critical decisions regarding proposed rules are often made in the months (and sometimes years) before rules are published, little is known about how agencies actually develop these rules. In light of the possibility that the impact of the notice and comment requirement may be “limited by the fact that some of the most critical decisions in rulemaking are often made before a proposal appears in the Federal Register," the study will cover how proposed rules are developed as a policy-making process.

==== Judicial Review Study ====
According to an informal review by CRS, approximately fifty percent of court challenges to agency rulemakings are successful. To confirm this estimate, CRS arranged to have an independent analysis of every case involving administrative agencies that were appealed to the U.S. Court of Appeals for all 12 circuits over a ten-year period. Professor Jody Freeman of Harvard University is conducting the study under supervision of CRS. The study is examining a database of 3,075 cases supplied by the Administrative Office of the U.S. Courts. The text of each case will be analyzed to determine its outcome (e.g., reversed or affirmed), the reasons for the court's decision, and the judges involved in the decision. In addition, trends in the data such as whether certain agencies or types of rules are more likely to be reversed, will also be examined. The results of this study will be summarized in a written report to be completed by September.

==== Science Advisory Committees Study ====
A study on science advisory committees is being conducted by the Maxwell School of Syracuse University.
