= United States House Judiciary Subcommittee on Commercial and Administrative Law =

The Subcommittee on Commercial and Administrative Law (CAL) is a former subcommittee of the United States House Committee on the Judiciary. It was incorporated into the Subcommittee on Courts, Commercial and Administrative Law at the 112th Congress.

== Jurisdiction ==
From the House Rules:

- The Subcommittee on Commercial and Administrative Law shall have jurisdiction over the following subject matters: bankruptcy and commercial law, bankruptcy judgeships, administrative law, independent counsel, state taxation affecting interstate commerce, interstate compacts, other appropriate matters as referred by the Chairman, and relevant oversight.

== Members, 111th Congress ==
Majority	Minority
Steve Cohen, Tennessee, Chairman; William Delahunt, Massachusetts; Mel Watt, North Carolina; Dan Maffei, New York; Zoe Lofgren, California; Hank Johnson, Georgia; Bobby Scott, Virginia; John Conyers, Jr., Michigan; Judy Chu, California	Trent Franks, Arizona, Ranking Member; Jim Jordan, Ohio; Darrell Issa, California; Randy Forbes, Virginia; Howard Coble, North Carolina; Steve King, Iowa
Ex officio
	Lamar S. Smith, Texas

== See also ==
- United States House Committee on the Judiciary
- Administrative Procedure Act (United States)
- Administrative Law, Process and Procedure Project
