= Administrative Conference of the United States =

Independent agency of the U.S. government

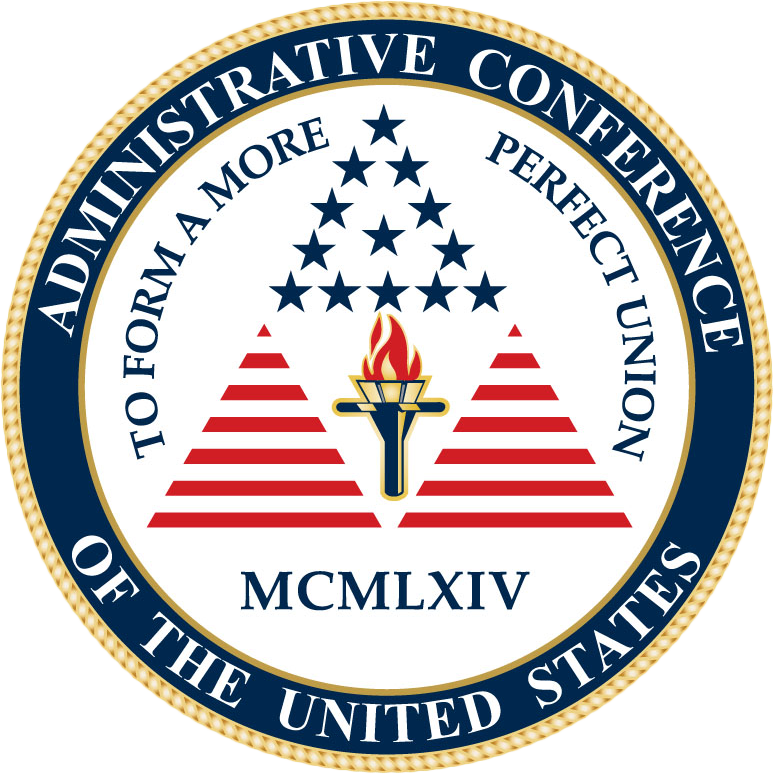
- Seal of the Administrative Conference of the United States

Agency overview
- Formed: 1964, revived 2009
- Headquarters: 1120 20th St. NW, Suite 706 South Washington, D.C.
- Employees: 18 (2018)
- Agency executives: Vacant, Chair; Vacant, Vice Chair
- Website: www.acus.gov

The Administrative Conference of the United States (ACUS) is an independent agency of the United States government that was established in 1964 by the Administrative Conference Act (5 U.S.C. § 593). The conference's purpose is to "promote improvements in the efficiency, adequacy, and fairness of the procedures by which federal agencies conduct regulatory programs, administer grants and benefits, and perform related governmental functions."

To this end, the conference conducts research and issues reports concerning various aspects of the administrative process and, when warranted, makes recommendations to the President, Congress, particular departments and agencies, and the judiciary concerning the need for procedural reforms. Of these recommendations, 33% have focused on reducing government costs and increasing revenue, 26% on improving the use of science in the administrative process, and 20% on reducing litigation in the regulatory process. Implementation of conference recommendations may be accomplished by direct action on the part of the affected agencies or through legislative changes.

== Structure ==
The chair is appointed by the president, with the advice and consent of the U.S. Senate, for a 5-year term. The other ten members of the council, which acts as an executive board, are appointed by the president for 3-year terms. Federal officials may comprise no more than one-half of the full membership of the council. The chair is the only full-time compensated member.

In order to draw on a wide array of expertise and ensure diversity of views that contribute to the formulation of ACUS recommendations, conference membership consists of no fewer than 75 and no more than 101 members who are chosen from government agencies, the practicing bar, academia, corporations, and nonprofit entities. Each member serves on one of the ACUS committees, which are devoted to one of five administrative procedure subjects: adjudication, administration and management, judicial review, regulation, and rulemaking. ACUS estimates that its volunteer experts bring an added $1.1 million of value to agency work.

== History ==
ACUS was established as a permanent federal agency to continue the work of two temporary administrative conferences convened during the Eisenhower and Kennedy administrations. Both temporary conferences had recommended the creation of a permanent body to study administrative procedures on an ongoing basis and propose improvements.

ACUS began operations with the appointment and confirmation of its first chair in 1968. In three decades, the conference undertook more than 200 recommendation projects examining various areas of administrative law and practice. In 1995, the conference ceased operations due to loss of funding, but the statutory provisions establishing ACUS were not repealed.

In support of the reauthorization of ACUS, U.S. Supreme Court Justice Antonin Scalia, a former chair of ACUS, testified before the House Judiciary Committee that the conference represented “a unique combination of talents from the academic world, from within the executive branch... and ... from the private bar, especially lawyers particularly familiar with administrative law". He also described ACUS as “one of the federal government’s ‘best bargains... for the buck’”. Following this and other testimony, Congress reauthorized the conference in 2004 and again in 2008.

The 2004 legislation expanded the ACUS' responsibilities to include improving public participation and efficiency in agency proceedings, reducing unnecessary litigation, and strengthening the use of scientific evidence in rulemaking. Funding was approved in 2009, and the conference was officially re-established in March 2010, when the United States Senate confirmed Paul R. Verkuil as chair. The re-established ACUS started a new online presence, including a searchable database of publications and recommendations throughout its existence from 1968 to 1995 and its re-establishment in March 2010 to present.

== Recommendations and resources ==
=== Early recommendations and legislative impact ===
Many early ACUS recommendations were subsequently enacted into law by Congress, and others have been cited or applied by federal agencies and courts. For example, ACUS has issued recommendations addressing procedural barriers to judicial review of agency decisions. In 2007, the Congressional Research Service said that ACUS offered “nonpartisan, nonbiased, comprehensive, and practical assessments and guidance with respect to a wide range of agency processes, procedures, and practices”.

ACUS also worked to develop and implement the use of alternative dispute resolution techniques in administrative practice, with the goal of decreasing litigation cost and delays in agency programs. These efforts resulted in the Administrative Dispute Resolution Act in 1990, by which Congress provided a framework for agencies to use alternative dispute resolution to resolve administrative litigation. ACUS also explored—and worked to implement through legislation—alternative dispute resolution techniques in rulemaking. The conference's recommendations on negotiating regulations served as the groundwork for the Negotiated Rulemaking Act.

=== Recommendations since 2010 ===
Since its re-establishment in 2010, the conference has adopted more than 40 recommendations and statements providing recommended reforms directed to federal agencies, Congress, the president, and the Judicial Conference of the United States. Although ACUS recommendations are non-binding, some of the more significant developments to grow out of ACUS's work include its recommendation addressing agency adjustments to civil monetary penalties was implemented by Congress in the Bipartisan Budget Act of 2015, which the Congressional Budget Office estimated would increase government revenue by $1.3 billion over the next ten years. Another recommendation was implemented through Executive Order 13,609, which seeks to reduce unnecessary international regulatory disparities that impose costs on business. Another recommendation prompted the Office of Management and Budget to update its guidance on how federal agencies can incorporate standards set by industrial, scientific, and other entities in their own regulations.

=== Training and resources ===
In addition to these recommendations, ACUS hosts trainings, working groups, and other initiatives for agency and congressional staff. The conference also has released a number of resources for agency officials and the general public. Two recent resources include the Sourcebook of United States Executive Agencies, which comprehensively catalogs the agencies and other organizational entities of the federal executive establishment, and the Federal Administrative Adjudication Database, a joint project with Stanford Law School to "map the contours of the federal administrative adjudicatory process, including both 'formal' adjudication conducted under the Administrative Procedure Act ('APA') and 'informal' adjudication".

== Chairs ==
- Jerre S. Williams (1968–1970)
- Roger C. Cramton (1970–1972)
- Antonin Scalia (1972–1974)
- Robert Anthony (1974–1979)
- Reuben B. Robertson (1980–1981)
- Loren A. Smith (1981–1985)
- Marshall J. Breger (1985–1991)
- Brian C. Griffin (1992–1993)
- Thomasina V. Rogers (1994–1995)
- Office vacant (1995–2010)
- Paul R. Verkuil (2010–2015)
- Andrew Fois (2022–2025)

== See also ==
- Administrative Law, Process and Procedure Project
- Office of Technology Assessment – another federal advisory body that was defunded in 1995
- Title 1 of the Code of Federal Regulations
- United States Administrative Law
