= Bryan A. Garner =

American lawyer and lexicographer (born 1958)

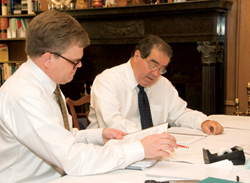
- Garner (left) working on a book with Antonin Scalia in 2007
- Born: Bryan Andrew Garner; November 17, 1958 (age 67); Lubbock, Texas, U.S.
- Education: University of Texas at Austin (BA, JD)
- Occupations: Lawyer; lexicographer
- Spouse: Karolyne Hu Cheng Garner
- Writing career
- Notable works: Garner's Dictionary of Legal Usage (Note: Previously known as A Modern Dictionary of Legal Usage.) (1987–2011); Garner's Modern English Usage (Note: Previously known as A Dictionary of Modern American Usage.) (1998–2016)

Bryan Andrew Garner (born November 17, 1958) is an American legal scholar and lexicographer who has been the editor of Black’s Law Dictionary since 1999. He has written more than two dozen books about English usage and style, such as Garner's Modern English Usage for a general audience and others for legal professionals. Garner also wrote two books with Justice Antonin Scalia: Making Your Case: The Art of Persuading Judges (2008) and Reading Law: The Interpretation of Legal Texts (2012).

Garner is the founder and chair of the board for the American Friends of Dr. Johnson's House, a nonprofit organization supporting the house museum in London that was the former home of Samuel Johnson, the author of the first authoritative Dictionary of the English Language.

== Early life and education ==
Garner was born on November 17, 1958, in Lubbock, Texas, and grew up Canyon, Texas. He graduated from the University of Texas at Austin in 1980 with a Bachelor of Arts with special honors in its Plan II honors program. He later published excerpts from his senior thesis, notably "Shakespeare's Latinate Neologisms" and "Latin-Saxon Hybrids in Shakespeare and the Bible". He then attended the University of Texas School of Law, where he was an associate editor of the Texas Law Review. He graduated in 1984 with a Juris Doctor.

== Career ==
After graduating from law school, Garner was a law clerk to Judge Thomas M. Reavley of the U.S. Court of Appeals for the Fifth Circuit from 1984 to 1985. He then joined the Dallas law firm of Carrington, Coleman, Sloman & Blumenthal. He later returned to the University of Texas School of Law and was named director of the Texas/Oxford Center for Legal Lexicography. In 1990, he left the university to found LawProse Inc., which provides seminars on clear writing, briefing and editing for lawyers and judges.

Garner has taught at the University of Texas School of Law, the UC Berkeley School of Law, Texas Tech University School of Law, SMU Dedman School of Law and Texas A&M University School of Law. He has been awarded three honorary doctorates from Stetson, La Verne, and Thomas M. Cooley Law School. He serves on the Board of Advisers of The Green Bag.

== Author ==
As a student at the University of Texas School of Law in 1981, Garner began noticing odd usages in lawbooks, many of them dating back to Shakespeare. They became the source material for his first book, A Dictionary of Modern Legal Usage (1987). Since 1990, his work has focused on teaching the legal profession clear writing techniques.

In books, articles, and lectures, Garner has tried to reform the way bibliographic references are "interlarded" (interwoven) in the midst of textual analysis. He argues for putting citations in footnotes and notes that in-text information that is important but non-bibliographic. He opposes references such as "457 U.S. 423, 432, 102 S.Ct. 2515, 2521, 89 L.Ed.2d 744, 747" as interruptions in the middle of a line. However, such interruptions in judges' opinions and in lawyers' briefs have remained the norm. Some courts and advocates around the country have begun adopting Garner's recommended style of footnoted citations, and a degree of internal strife has resulted within some organizations. For example, one appellate judge in Louisiana refused to join in a colleague's opinions written in the new format.

Garner says that one of the main reasons for the reform is to make legal writing more comprehensible to readers who lack a legal education. That has attracted opposition, most notably from Judge Richard Posner of the U.S. Court of Appeals for the Seventh Circuit, and from his co-author, Justice Antonin Scalia.

Since 1992, Garner has contributed numerous revisions to the field of procedural rules, when he began revising all amendments to the sets of Federal Rules (Civil, Appellate, Evidence, Bankruptcy, and Criminal) for the Judicial Conference of the United States.

Garner and Justice Scalia wrote Making Your Case: The Art of Persuading Judges (2008). Garner maintains a legal consulting practice, focusing on issues in statutory construction and contractual interpretation.

=== English grammar and usage ===
Garner's books on English usage include Garner's Modern English Usage. This dictionary was the subject of David Foster Wallace's essay "Authority and American Usage" in Consider the Lobster and Other Essays, originally published in the April 2001 issue of Harper's Magazine. In 2003, Garner contributed a chapter on grammar and usage to the 15th edition of The Chicago Manual of Style, and later editions have retained it.

=== Black's Law Dictionary ===
In 1995, Garner became the editor-in-chief of Black's Law Dictionary. He created a panel of international legal experts to improve the specialized vocabulary in the book. Garner and the panel rewrote and expanded the dictionary's lexicographic information.

== Bibliography ==
Only current editions are shown.

- Hardly Harmless Drudgery: A 500-Year Pictorial History of the Lexicographic Geniuses, Sciolists, Plagiarists, and Obsessives Who Defined the English Language (with Jack Lynch, 2024)
- Garner's Modern English Usage (5th ed. 2022)
- Taming the Tongue: In the Heyday of English Grammar (1711–1851) (2021)
- Garner's Guidelines for Drafting and Editing Contracts (2019)
- Nino and Me: My Unusual Friendship with Justice Antonin Scalia (2017). Threshold Editions. ISBN 9781501181498
- The Law of Judicial Precedent (Garner et al., 2016). ISBN 9780314634207
- The Chicago Guide to Grammar, Usage, and Punctuation (2016; an expanded version of his chapter in The Chicago Manual of Style)
- The Rules of Golf in Plain English (with Jeffrey S. Kuhn, 4th ed. 2016)
- Black's Law Dictionary (12th ed. 2024; abr. 10th ed. 2015; and 6th pocket ed. 2021)
- Guidelines for Drafting and Editing Legislation (2015)
- The Winning Brief: 100 Tips for Persuasive Briefing in Trial and Appellate Courts (3rd ed. 2014)
- HBR Guide to Better Business Writing (2013)
- Legal Writing in Plain English: A Text with Exercises (2nd ed. 2013)
- Quack This Way: David Foster Wallace & Bryan A. Garner Talk Language and Writing (transcript of an interview with David Foster Wallace, 2013). RosePen Books. ISBN 9780991118113
- The Redbook: A Manual on Legal Style (4th ed. 2018)
- Reading Law: The Interpretation of Legal Texts (with Justice Antonin Scalia, 2012)
- Garner's Dictionary of Legal Usage (3rd ed. 2011; original title A Dictionary of Modern Legal Usage)
- The Chicago Manual of Style, Ch. 5 "Grammar and Usage", (16th ed. 2010)
- Ethical Communications for Lawyers: Upholding Professional Responsibility (2009). LawProse, Inc. ISBN 9780979606021
- Garner on Language and Writing: Selected Essays and Speeches of Bryan A. Garner (foreword by Justice Ruth Bader Ginsburg, 2009). American Bar Association. ISBN 9781604424454
- The Winning Oral Argument: Enduring Principles with Supporting Comments from the Literature (2nd ed. 2009)
- Making Your Case: The Art of Persuading Judges (with Justice Antonin Scalia, 2008)
- A New Miscellany-at-Law: Yet Another Diversion for Lawyers and Others (by Robert Megarry, Garner ed., 2005). Hart. ISBN 9781584776314
- The Elements of Legal Style (2nd ed. 2002)
- Guidelines for Drafting and Editing Court Rules (2002)
- A Handbook of Family Law Terms (2001). West Group. ISBN 9780314249067
- A Handbook of Criminal Law Terms (2000). West Group. ISBN 9780314243225
- The Oxford Dictionary of American Usage and Style (2000; an abridged version of A Dictionary of Modern American Usage, 1st ed. 1998)
- A Handbook of Basic Law Terms (1998). West Group. ISBN 9780314233820
- A Handbook of Business Law Terms (1999). West Group. ISBN 9780314239358
- Securities Disclosure in Plain English (1999). CCH Inc. ISBN 9780808003212
- The Scribes Journal of Legal Writing (founded by Garner in 1990; he was editor-in-chief for volumes 1–7)
- Texas, Our Texas: Remembrances of The University (1984). ISBN 9780890154489 (editor)

== See also ==
- Skunked term
