= Antonin Scalia =

US Supreme Court justice from 1986 to 2016

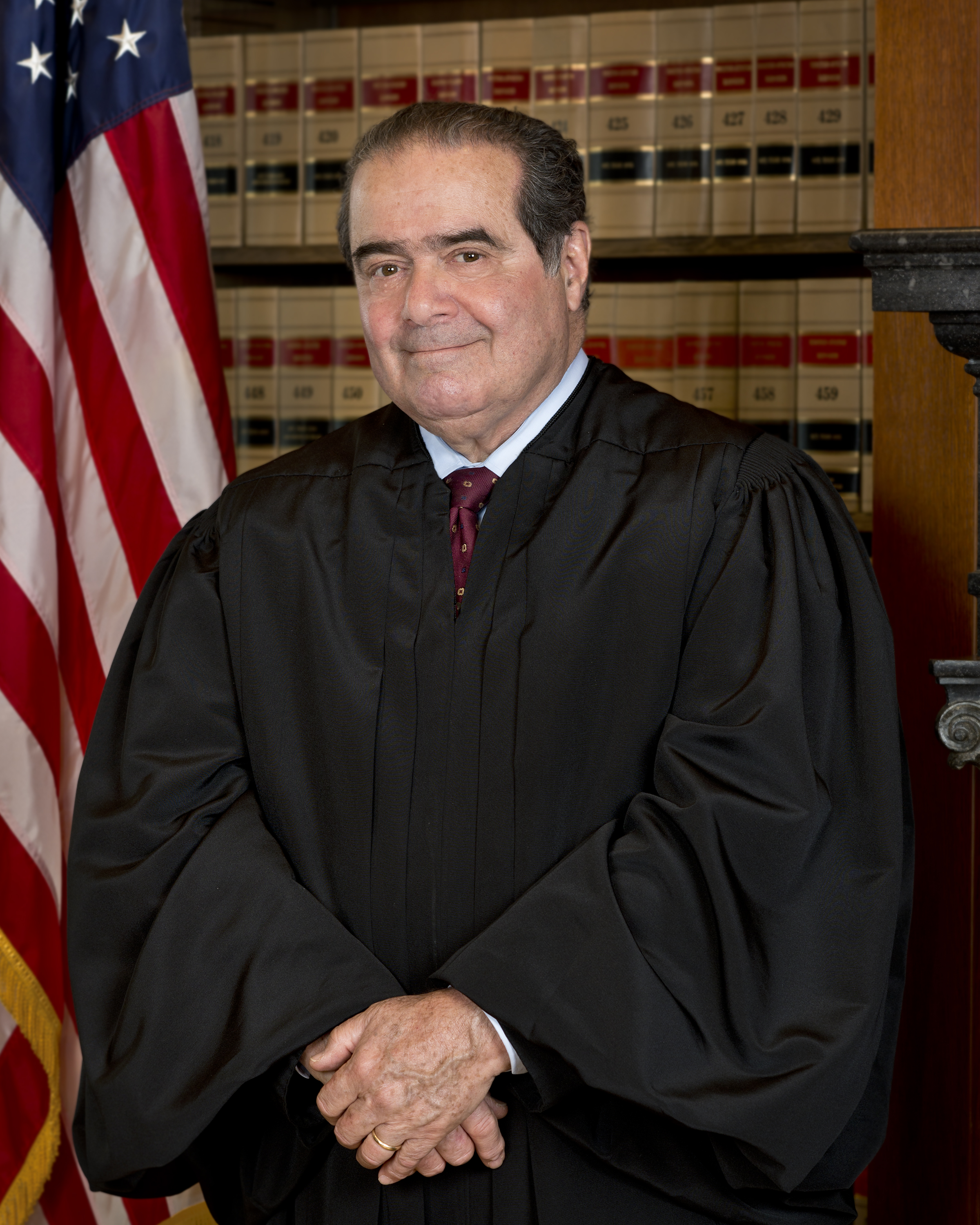
- Official portrait, 2013

Associate Justice of the Supreme Court of the United States
- In office September 26, 1986 – February 13, 2016
- Nominated by: Ronald Reagan
- Preceded by: William Rehnquist
- Succeeded by: Neil Gorsuch

Judge of the United States Court of Appeals for the District of Columbia Circuit
- In office August 17, 1982 – September 26, 1986
- Nominated by: Ronald Reagan
- Preceded by: Roger Robb
- Succeeded by: David Sentelle

United States Assistant Attorney General for the Office of Legal Counsel
- In office August 22, 1974 – January 20, 1977
- President: Gerald Ford
- Preceded by: Roger C. Cramton
- Succeeded by: John Harmon

Chair of the Administrative Conference of the United States
- In office September 1972 – August 1974
- President: Richard Nixon
- Preceded by: Roger C. Cramton
- Succeeded by: Robert Anthony

Personal details
- Born: Antonin Gregory Scalia; March 11, 1936 Trenton, New Jersey, U.S.
- Died: February 13, 2016 (aged 79) Presidio County, Texas, U.S.
- Resting place: Fairfax Memorial Park
- Spouse: Maureen McCarthy (m. 1960)
- Children: 9, including Eugene
- Education: Georgetown University (BA); Harvard University (LLB)
- Awards: Francis Boyer Award (1989); Scribes Lifetime-Achievement Award (2008); Presidential Medal of Freedom (posthumous, 2018)
- Antonin Scalia's voice Antonin Scalia delivers the opinion of the Court in United States v. Gonzalez-Lopez. Recorded June 26, 2006

Antonin Gregory Scalia (Note: Pronounced /ˈæntənɪn skəˈliːə/ AN-tən-in skə-LEE-ə, Italian: [skaˈliːa].) (March 11, 1936 – February 13, 2016) (Note: Journalistic sources were divided as to whether Scalia died on the night of February 12, 2016, or on the morning of February 13, 2016.) was an American jurist who served as an associate justice of the Supreme Court of the United States from 1986 until his death in 2016. He was described as the intellectual anchor for the originalist and textualist position in the Court's conservative wing. For catalyzing an originalist and textualist movement in American law, he has been described as one of the most influential jurists of the twentieth century, and one of the most important justices in the history of the Supreme Court. Scalia was posthumously awarded the Presidential Medal of Freedom in 2018, and the Antonin Scalia Law School at George Mason University was named in his honor.

Scalia was born in Trenton, New Jersey. A devout Catholic, he attended the Jesuit Xavier High School before receiving his undergraduate degree from Georgetown University. Scalia went on to graduate from Harvard Law School and spent six years at Jones Day before becoming a law professor at the University of Virginia. In the early 1970s, he served in the Nixon and Ford administrations, eventually becoming an assistant attorney general under President Gerald Ford. He spent most of the Carter years teaching at the University of Chicago, where he became one of the first faculty advisers of the fledgling Federalist Society. In 1982, President Ronald Reagan appointed Scalia as a judge of the U.S. Court of Appeals for the District of Columbia Circuit. Four years later, Reagan appointed him to the Supreme Court, where Scalia became its first Italian-American justice following a unanimous confirmation by the U.S. Senate 98–0. (Note: Senators Barry Goldwater and Jake Garn were not present for the confirmation.)

Scalia espoused a conservative jurisprudence and ideology, advocating textualism in statutory interpretation and originalism in constitutional interpretation. He peppered his colleagues with "Ninograms" (memos named for his nickname, "Nino") intending to persuade them to his point of view. He was a strong defender of the powers of the executive branch and believed that the U.S. Constitution permitted the death penalty and did not guarantee the right to either abortion or same-sex marriage. Furthermore, Scalia viewed affirmative action and other policies that afforded special protected status to minority groups as unconstitutional. Such positions would earn him a reputation as one of the most conservative justices on the Court. He filed separate opinions in many cases, often castigating the Court's majority—sometimes scathingly so.

Scalia's most significant opinions include his lone dissent in Morrison v. Olson (arguing against the constitutionality of an Independent-Counsel law), and his majority opinions in Crawford v. Washington (defining a criminal defendant's confrontation right under the Sixth Amendment) and District of Columbia v. Heller (holding that the Second Amendment to the U.S. Constitution guarantees an individual right to handgun ownership).

== Early life and education ==
Scalia was born on March 11, 1936, in Trenton, New Jersey. He was the only child of Salvatore Eugenio "Eugene" Scalia (1903–1986), an Italian immigrant from Sommatino, Sicily. Salvatore graduated from Rutgers University and was a graduate student at Columbia University and clerk at the time of his son's birth. The elder Scalia would become a professor of Romance languages at Brooklyn College, where he was an adherent to the formalist New Criticism school of literary theory. Scalia's mother, Catherine Louise (née Panaro; 1905–1985), was born in Trenton to Italian immigrant parents and worked as an elementary school teacher.

In 1939, Scalia and his family moved to Elmhurst, Queens, where he attended P.S. 13 Clement C. Moore School. After completing eighth grade, he obtained an academic scholarship to Xavier High School, a Jesuit military school in Manhattan, from which he graduated ranked first in his class in 1953. Scalia achieved a 97.5 average at Xavier, earning decorations in Latin, Greek, and debate, among other subjects, in addition to being a distinguished member of its Glee club. He later reflected that he spent much of his time on schoolwork and admitted, "I was never cool."

While a youth, Scalia was also active as a Boy Scout and was part of the Scouts' national honor society, the Order of the Arrow. Classmate and future New York State official William Stern remembered Scalia in his high school days: "This kid was a conservative when he was 17 years old. An archconservative Catholic. He could have been a member of the Curia. He was the top student in the class. He was brilliant, way above everybody else."

In 1953, Scalia enrolled at Georgetown University, where he majored in history. He became a champion collegiate debater in Georgetown's Philodemic Society and a critically praised thespian. He took his junior year abroad in Switzerland at the University of Fribourg. Scalia graduated from Georgetown in 1957 as class valedictorian with a Bachelor of Arts, summa cum laude. Scalia then went to Harvard Law School, where he was a notes editor for the Harvard Law Review. He graduated in 1960 with a Bachelor of Laws, magna cum laude, among the top of the class. During his time at Harvard, Scalia was awarded a Sheldon Fellowship, which allowed him to travel abroad in Europe during 1960 and 1961.

== Early legal career (1961–1982) ==
Scalia began his legal career at the law firm Jones, Day, Cockley & Reavis (now Jones Day) in Cleveland, Ohio, where he worked from 1961 to 1967. He was highly regarded at the law firm and would most likely have been made a partner but later said he had long intended to teach. He left Jones Day in 1967 to become a professor at the University of Virginia School of Law, moving his family to Charlottesville.

After four years in Charlottesville, Scalia entered public service in 1971. President Richard Nixon appointed him general counsel for the Office of Telecommunications Policy, where one of his principal assignments was to formulate federal policy for the growth of cable television. From 1972 to 1974, he was chairman of the Administrative Conference of the United States, a small independent agency that sought to improve the functioning of the federal bureaucracy. In mid-1974, Nixon nominated him as Assistant Attorney General for the Office of Legal Counsel. After Nixon's resignation, the nomination was continued by President Gerald Ford, and Scalia was confirmed by the Senate on August 22, 1974.

In the aftermath of Watergate, the Ford administration was engaged in a number of conflicts with Congress. Scalia repeatedly testified before congressional committees, defending Ford administration assertions of executive privilege regarding its refusal to turn over documents. Within the administration, Scalia advocated a presidential veto for a bill to amend the Freedom of Information Act, which would greatly increase the act's scope. Scalia's view prevailed, and Ford vetoed the bill, but Congress overrode it. In early 1976, Scalia argued his only case before the Supreme Court, Alfred Dunhill of London, Inc. v. Republic of Cuba. Scalia, on behalf of the U.S. government, argued in support of Dunhill, and that position was successful. Following Ford's defeat by President Jimmy Carter, Scalia worked for several months at the American Enterprise Institute.

He then returned to academia, taking up residence at the University of Chicago Law School from 1977 to 1982, though he spent one year as a visiting professor at Stanford Law School. During Scalia's time at Chicago, Peter H. Russell hired him on behalf of the Canadian government to write a report on how the United States was able to limit the activities of its secret services for the McDonald Commission, which was investigating abuses by the Royal Canadian Mounted Police. The report—finished in 1979—encouraged the commission to recommend that a balance be struck between civil liberties and the essentially unchecked activities of the RCMP. In 1981, he became the first faculty adviser for the University of Chicago's chapter of the newly founded Federalist Society.

== U.S. Court of Appeals for the D.C. Circuit (1982–1986) ==
When Ronald Reagan was elected president in November 1980, Scalia hoped for a major position in the new administration. He was interviewed for the position of solicitor general of the United States, but the position went to Rex E. Lee, to Scalia's great disappointment. Scalia was offered a judgeship on the Chicago-based U.S. Court of Appeals for the Seventh Circuit in early 1982 but declined it, hoping to be appointed to the more influential U.S. Court of Appeals for the District of Columbia Circuit. Later that year, Reagan offered Scalia a seat on the D.C. Circuit, which he accepted. He was confirmed by the U.S. Senate on August 5, 1982, and was sworn in on August 17, 1982.

On the D.C. Circuit, Scalia built a conservative record while winning applause in legal circles for powerful, witty legal writing which was often critical of the Supreme Court precedents he felt bound as a lower-court judge to follow. Scalia's opinions drew the attention of Reagan administration officials, who, according to The New York Times, "liked virtually everything they saw and ... listed him as a leading Supreme Court prospect".

== Nomination to the Supreme Court of the United States (1986) ==
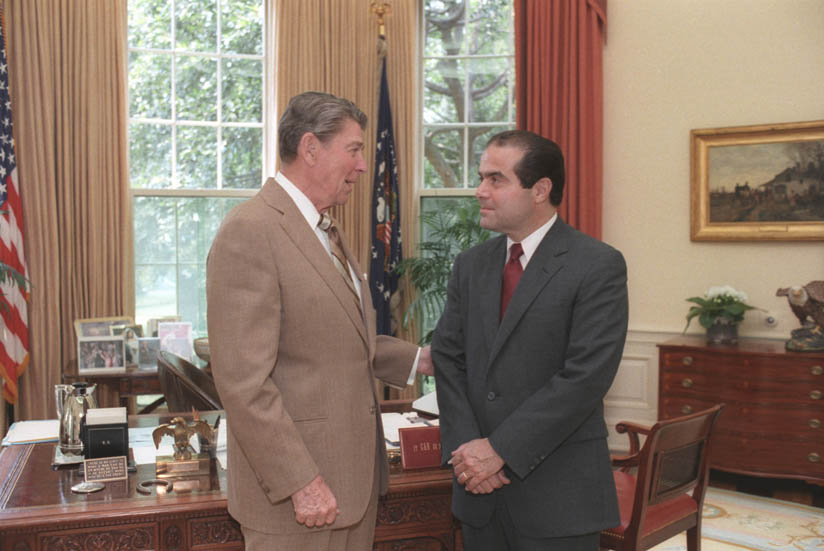
Ronald Reagan and Scalia (his nominee) in the Oval Office, July 7, 1986

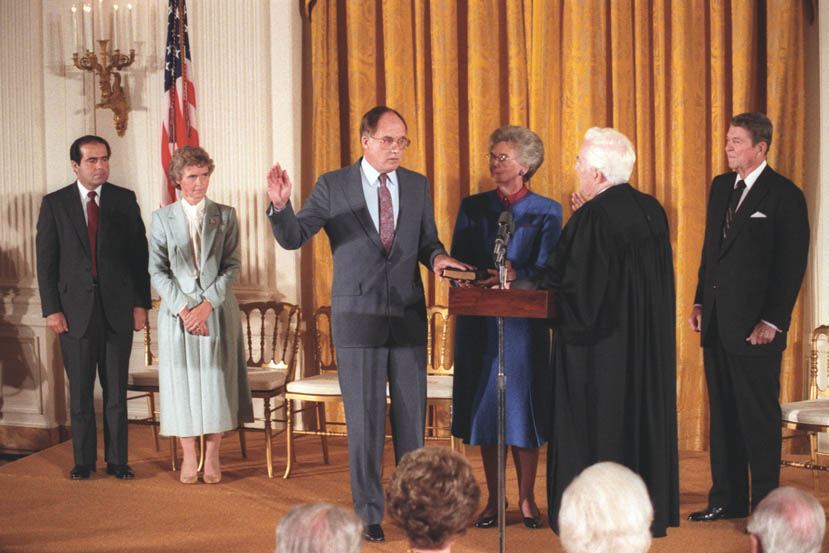
Judge and Mrs. Scalia (left) and President Reagan (right) watch as Chief Justice Warren Burger swears William Rehnquist in as the next Chief Justice, September 26, 1986.

In 1986, Chief Justice Warren Burger informed the White House of his intent to retire. Reagan first decided to nominate Associate Justice William Rehnquist to become Chief Justice. That choice meant that Reagan would also have to choose a nominee to fill Rehnquist's seat as associate justice. Attorney General Edwin Meese, who advised Reagan on the choice, seriously considered only Scalia and Robert Bork, a fellow judge on the DC Circuit. Feeling that this might well be Reagan's last opportunity to pick a Supreme Court justice, the president and his advisers chose Scalia over Bork. Many factors influenced the decision. Reagan wanted to appoint the first Italian-American justice. In addition, Scalia was nine years younger and would likely serve longer on the Court. Scalia also had the advantage of not having Bork's "paper trail"; the elder judge had written controversial articles about individual rights. Scalia was called to the White House and accepted Reagan's nomination.

When Senate Judiciary Committee hearings on Scalia's nomination opened in August 1986, he faced a committee that had just argued divisively over the Rehnquist nomination. Witnesses and Democratic senators contended that before becoming a judge, Rehnquist had engaged in activities designed to discourage minorities from voting. Committee members had little taste for a second battle over Scalia and were in any event reluctant to oppose the first Italian-American Supreme Court nominee. The judge was not pressed heavily on controversial issues such as abortion or civil rights. Scalia, who attended the hearing with his wife and nine children seated behind him, found time for a humorous exchange with Sen. Howard Metzenbaum (D-OH), whom he had defeated in a tennis match in, as the nominee put it, "a case of my integrity overcoming my judgment".

Scalia met no opposition from the committee. The Senate debated Scalia's nomination only briefly, confirming him 98–0 on September 17, thereby making him the Court's first Italian-American Justice. That vote followed Rehnquist's confirmation as Chief Justice by a vote of 65–33 on the same day. Scalia took his seat on September 26, 1986. One committee member, Senator and future President Joe Biden (D-DE), later stated that he regretted not having opposed Scalia "because he was so effective".

== Supreme Court ==
=== Governmental structure and powers ===
==== Separation of powers ====
Justice Scalia testified before the Senate Judiciary Committee about separation of powers and checks and balances of the U.S. Government.

It was Scalia's view that clear lines of separation among the legislative, executive, and judicial branches follow directly from the Constitution, with no branch allowed to exercise powers granted to another branch. In his early days on the Court, he authored a powerful—and solitary—dissent in Morrison v. Olson (1988), in which the Court's majority upheld the Independent Counsel law. Scalia's thirty-page draft dissent surprised Justice Harry Blackmun for its emotional content; Blackmun felt "it could be cut down to ten pages if Scalia omitted the screaming". Scalia indicated that the law was an unwarranted encroachment on the executive branch by the legislative. He warned, "Frequently an issue of this sort will come before the Court clad, so to speak, in sheep's clothing ... But this wolf comes as a wolf".

The 1989 case of Mistretta v. United States challenged the United States Sentencing Commission, an independent body within the judicial branch whose members (some of whom were federal judges) were removable only for good cause. The petitioner argued that the arrangement violated the separation of powers and that the United States Sentencing Guidelines promulgated by the commission were invalid. Eight justices joined in the majority opinion written by Blackmun, upholding the Guidelines as constitutional. Scalia dissented, stating that the issuance of the Guidelines was a lawmaking function that Congress could not delegate and dubbed the Commission "a sort of junior-varsity Congress".

In 1996, Congress passed the Line Item Veto Act, which allowed the president to cancel items from an appropriations bill (a bill authorizing spending) once passed into law. The statute was challenged the following year. The matter rapidly reached the Supreme Court, which struck down the law as violating the Presentment Clause of the Constitution, which governs what the president is permitted to do with a bill once it has passed both houses of Congress. Scalia dissented, seeing no Presentment Clause difficulties and feeling that the act did not violate the separation of powers. He argued that authorizing the president to cancel an appropriation was no different from allowing him to spend an appropriation at his discretion, which had long been accepted as constitutional.

==== Detainee cases ====
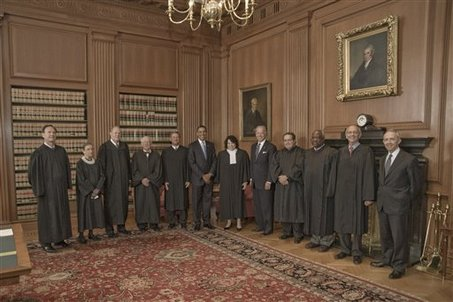
The 2009–2010 Court, with President Barack Obama, Vice President Joe Biden and retiring justice David Souter with Scalia fourth from right

In 2004, in Rasul v. Bush, the Court held that federal courts had jurisdiction to hear habeas corpus petitions brought by detainees at the Guantanamo Bay detainment camp. Scalia accused the majority of "spring[ing] a trap on the Executive" by ruling that it could hear cases involving persons at Guantanamo when no federal court had ever ruled that it had the authority to hear cases involving people there.

Scalia, joined by Justice John Paul Stevens, also dissented in the 2004 case of Hamdi v. Rumsfeld, involving Yaser Hamdi, an American citizen detained in the United States on the allegation he was an enemy combatant. The Court held that although Congress had authorized Hamdi's detention, Fifth Amendment due process guarantees giving a citizen such as Hamdi held in the United States as an enemy combatant the right to contest that detention before a neutral decision maker. Scalia opined that the AUMF (Authorization for Use of Military Force Against Terrorists) could not be read to suspend habeas corpus and that the Court, faced with legislation by Congress that did not grant the president power to detain Hamdi, was trying to "Make Everything Come Out Right".

In March 2006, Scalia gave a talk at the University of Fribourg in Switzerland. When asked about detainee rights, he responded: "Give me a break ... I had a son on that battlefield and they were shooting at my son, and I'm not about to give this man who was captured in a war a full jury trial. I mean it's crazy". Although Scalia was not referring to any particular individual, the Supreme Court was about to consider the case of Salim Ahmed Hamdan, supposed driver to Osama bin Laden, who was challenging the military commissions at Guantanamo Bay. A group of retired military officers that supported Hamdan's position asked Scalia to recuse himself, or step aside from hearing the case, which he declined to do. The Court held 5–3 in Hamdan v. Rumsfeld that the federal courts had jurisdiction to consider Hamdan's claims; Scalia, in dissent, contended that any Court authority to consider Hamdan's petition had been eliminated by the jurisdiction-stripping Detainee Treatment Act of 2005.

==== Federalism ====
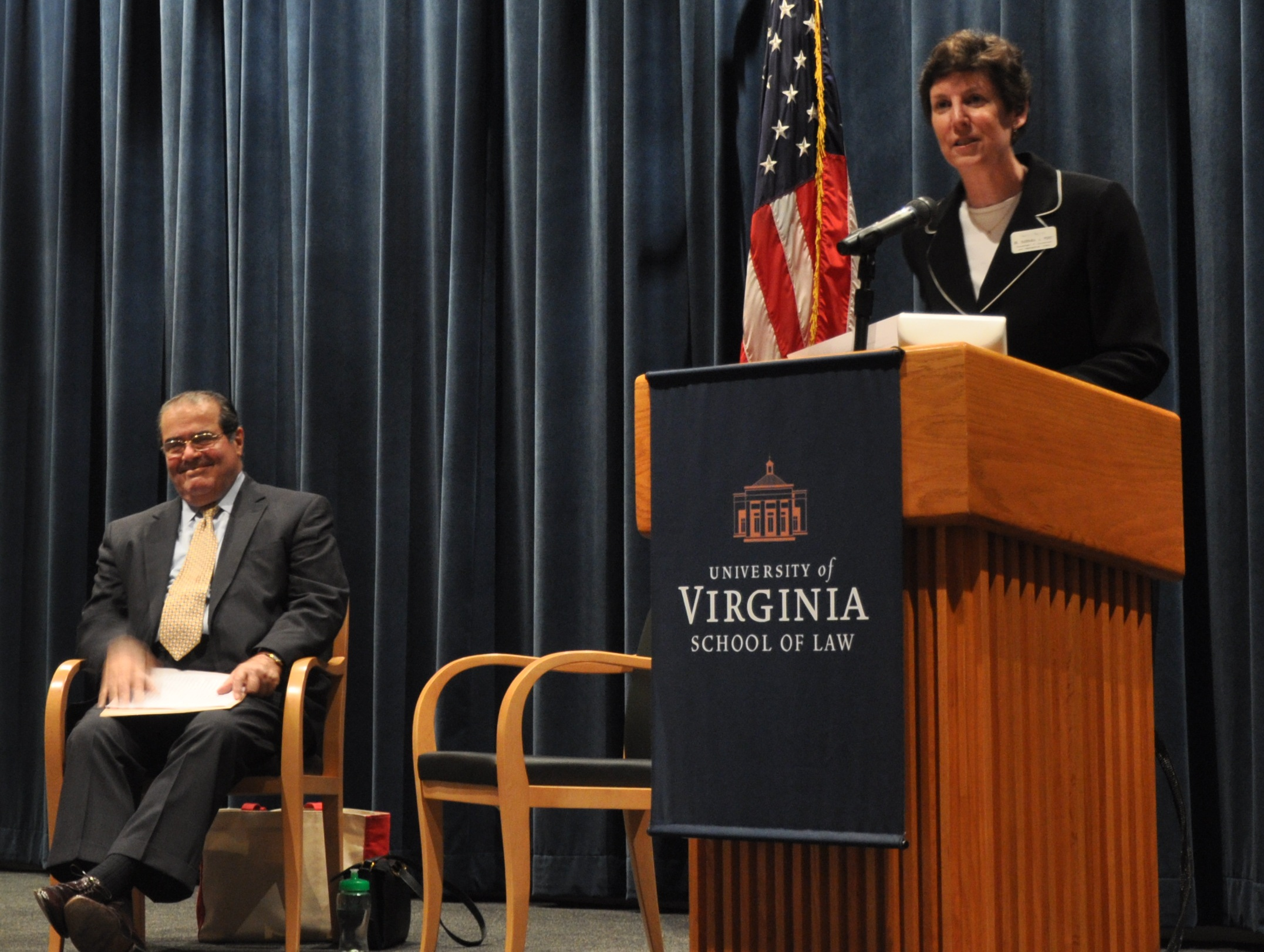
Scalia (left) at the University of Virginia School of Law, 2010

In federalism cases pitting the powers of the federal government against those of the states, Scalia often took the states' positions. In 1997, the Supreme Court considered the case of Printz v. United States, a challenge to certain provisions of the Brady Handgun Violence Prevention Act, which required chief law enforcement officers of localities in states to perform certain duties. In Printz, Scalia wrote the Court's majority decision. The Supreme Court ruled unconstitutional the provision that imposed those duties as violating the Tenth Amendment, which reserves to the states and to the people those powers not granted to the federal government. In 2005, Scalia concurred in Gonzales v. Raich, which read the Commerce Clause to hold that Congress could ban the use of marijuana even when states approve its use for medicinal purposes. Scalia opined that the Commerce Clause, together with the Necessary and Proper Clause, permitted the regulation. In addition, Scalia felt that Congress may regulate intrastate activities if doing so is a necessary part of a more general regulation of interstate commerce. He based that decision on Wickard v. Filburn, which he now wrote "expanded the Commerce Clause beyond all reason".

Scalia rejected the existence of the negative Commerce Clause doctrine, calling it "a judicial fraud".

Scalia took a broad view of the Eleventh Amendment, which bars certain lawsuits against states in the federal courts. In his 1989 dissent in Pennsylvania v. Union Gas Co., Scalia stated that there was no intent on the part of the framers to have the states surrender any sovereign immunity and that the case that provoked the Eleventh Amendment, Chisholm v. Georgia, came as a surprise to them. Professor Ralph Rossum, who wrote a survey of Scalia's constitutional views, suggests that the justice's view of the Eleventh Amendment was actually contradictory to the language of the Amendment.

=== Individual rights ===
==== Abortion ====
Scalia argued that there is no constitutional right to abortion and that if the people desire legalized abortion, a law should be passed to accomplish it. In his dissenting opinion in the 1992 case of Planned Parenthood v. Casey, Scalia wrote:

The States may, if they wish, permit abortion on demand, but the Constitution does not require them to do so. The permissibility of abortion, and the limitations upon it, are to be resolved like most important questions in our democracy: by citizens trying to persuade one another and then voting.

"We can now look forward to at least another Term with carts full of mail from the public, and streets full of demonstrators, urging us — their unelected and life-tenured judges who have been awarded those extraordinary, undemocratic characteristics precisely in order that we might follow the law despite the popular will — to follow the popular will."

— Scalia, concurring in Webster v. Reproductive Health Services

Scalia repeatedly called upon his colleagues to strike down Roe v. Wade. Scalia hoped to find five votes to strike down Roe in the 1989 case of Webster v. Reproductive Health Services but was not successful in doing so. Justice Sandra Day O'Connor cast the deciding vote, allowing the abortion regulations at issue in the case to stand but not overruling Roe. Scalia concurred only in part, writing, "Justice O'Connor's assertion, that a 'fundamental rule of judicial restraint' requires us to avoid reconsidering Roe cannot be taken seriously". He noted, "We can now look forward to at least another Term of carts full of mail from the public, and the streets full of demonstrators".

The Court returned to the issue of abortion in the 2000 case of Stenberg v. Carhart, in which it invalidated a Nebraska statute outlawing partial-birth abortion. Justice Stephen Breyer wrote for the Court that the law was unconstitutional because it did not allow an exception for the health of the woman. Scalia dissented, comparing the Stenberg case to two of the most reviled cases in Supreme Court history: "I am optimistic enough to believe that, one day, Stenberg v. Carhart will be assigned its rightful place in the history of this Court's jurisprudence beside Korematsu and Dred Scott. The method of killing a human child ... proscribed by this statute is so horrible that the most clinical description of it evokes a shudder of revulsion".

In 2007, the Court upheld a federal statute banning partial-birth abortion in Gonzales v. Carhart. University of Chicago law professor Geoffrey R. Stone, a former colleague of Scalia's, criticized Gonzales, stating that religion had influenced the outcome because all five justices in the majority were Catholic, whereas the dissenters were Protestant or Jewish. This angered Scalia to such an extent that he stated he would not speak at the University of Chicago as long as Stone was there.

==== Race, gender, and sexual orientation ====
Scalia generally voted to strike down laws that make distinctions by race, gender, or sexual orientation. In 1989, he concurred with the Court's judgment in City of Richmond v. J.A. Croson Co., in which the Court applied strict scrutiny to a city program requiring a certain percentage of contracts to go to minorities, and struck down the program. Scalia did not join the majority opinion, however. He disagreed with O'Connor's opinion for the Court, holding that states and localities could institute race-based programs if they identified past discrimination and if the programs were designed to remedy the past racism. Five years later, in Adarand Constructors, Inc. v. Peña, he concurred in the Court's judgment and in part with the opinion that extended strict scrutiny to federal programs. Scalia noted in that matter his view that government can never have a compelling interest in making up for past discrimination by racial preferences:

To pursue the concept of racial entitlement—even for the most admirable and benign of purposes—is to reinforce and preserve for future mischief the way of thinking that produced race slavery, race privilege and race hatred. In the eyes of government, we are just one race here. It is American.

In the 2003 case of Grutter v. Bollinger, involving racial preferences in the University of Michigan's law school, Scalia mocked the Court majority's finding that the school was entitled to continue using race as a factor in admissions to promote diversity and to increase "cross-racial understanding". Scalia noted:

This is not, of course, an "educational benefit" on which students will be graded on their Law School transcript (Works and Plays Well with Others: B+) or tested by the bar examiners (Q: Describe in 500 words or less your cross-racial understanding). For it is a lesson of life rather than law—essentially the same lesson taught to (or rather learned by, for it cannot be "taught" in the usual sense) people three feet shorter and twenty years younger than the full-grown adults at the University of Michigan Law School, in institutions ranging from Boy Scout troops to public-school kindergartens.

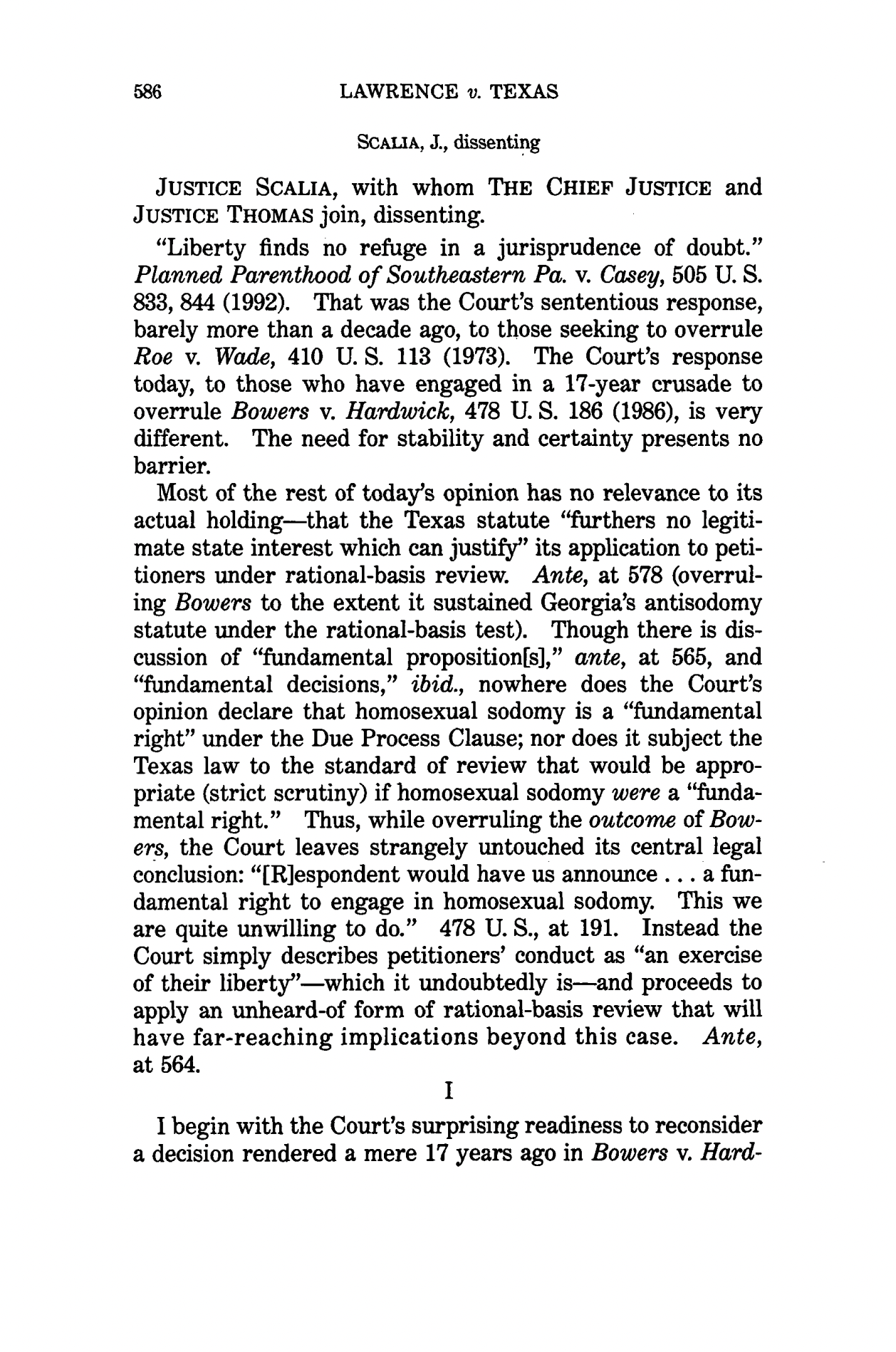
Opening page of Scalia's dissent in Lawrence v. Texas

Scalia argued that laws that make distinctions between genders should be subjected to intermediate scrutiny, requiring that the gender classification be substantially related to important government objectives. When, in 1996, the Court upheld a suit brought by a woman who wished to enter the Virginia Military Institute in the case of United States v. Virginia, Scalia filed a lone, lengthy dissent. Scalia said that the Court, in requiring Virginia to show an "extremely persuasive justification" for the single-sex admission policy, had redefined intermediate scrutiny in such a way "that makes it indistinguishable from strict scrutiny".

In one of the final decisions of the Burger Court, the Court ruled in 1986 in Bowers v. Hardwick that "homosexual sodomy" was not protected by the right of privacy and could be criminally prosecuted by the states. In 1995, however, that ruling was effectively gutted by Romer v. Evans, which struck down a Colorado state constitutional amendment, passed by popular vote, that forbade antidiscrimination laws' being extended to sexual orientation. Scalia dissented from the opinion by Justice Kennedy, believing that Bowers had protected the right of the states to pass such measures and that the Colorado amendment was not discriminatory but merely prevented homosexuals from gaining favored status under Colorado law. Scalia later said of Romer, "And the Supreme Court said, 'Yes, it is unconstitutional.' On the basis of—I don't know, the Sexual Preference Clause of the Bill of Rights, presumably. And the liberals loved it, and the conservatives gnashed their teeth".

In 2003, Bowers was formally overruled by Lawrence v. Texas, from which Scalia dissented. According to Mark V. Tushnet in his survey of the Rehnquist Court, during the oral argument in the case, Scalia seemed so intent on making the state's argument for it that the Chief Justice intervened. According to his biographer, Joan Biskupic, Scalia "ridiculed" the majority in his dissent for being so ready to cast aside Bowers when many of the same justices had refused to overturn Roe in Planned Parenthood v. Casey. In March 2009, openly gay Congressman Barney Frank described him as a "homophobe". Maureen Dowd described Scalia in a 2003 column as "Archie Bunker in a high-backed chair". In an op-ed for The New York Times, federal appeals judge Richard Posner and Georgia State University law professor Eric Segall called Scalia's positions on homosexuality radical and characterized Scalia's "political ideal as verg[ing] on majoritarian theocracy". Former Scalia clerk Ed Whelan called this "a smear and a distraction." Professor John O. McGinnis responded as well, leading to further exchanges.

In the 2013 case of Hollingsworth v. Perry, which involved a California ballot initiative known as Proposition 8 that amended the California State Constitution to ban same-sex marriage, Scalia voted with the majority to uphold a lower court decision overturning the ban. The decision was based on the appellants' lack of standing to appeal and not on the substantive issue of the constitutionality of Proposition 8.

Also in 2013, Scalia dissented from the majority opinion in United States v. Windsor. In Windsor, the Court held Section Three of the Defense of Marriage Act (DOMA) (which—for federal government purposes—defined the terms "marriage" and "spouse" as applicable only to opposite-sex unions) unconstitutional under the Due Process Clause of the Fifth Amendment. Scalia's dissent, which was joined in full by Justice Thomas and in part by Chief Justice Roberts, opened:

This case is about power in several respects. It is about the power of our people to govern themselves, and the power of this Court to pronounce the law. Today's opinion aggrandizes the latter, with the predictable consequence of diminishing the former. We have no power to decide this case. And even if we did, we have no power under the Constitution to invalidate this democratically adopted legislation.

Scalia argued that the judgment effectively characterized opponents of same-sex marriage as "enemies of the human race": He argued that the Court's ruling would affect state bans on same-sex marriage as well:

As far as this Court is concerned, no one should be fooled; it is just a matter of listening and waiting for the other shoe. By formally declaring anyone opposed to same-sex marriage an enemy of human decency, the majority arms well every challenger to a state law restricting marriage to its traditional definition.

Scalia concluded by saying that the Supreme Court "has cheated both sides, robbing the winners of an honest victory, and the losers of the peace that comes from a fair defeat."

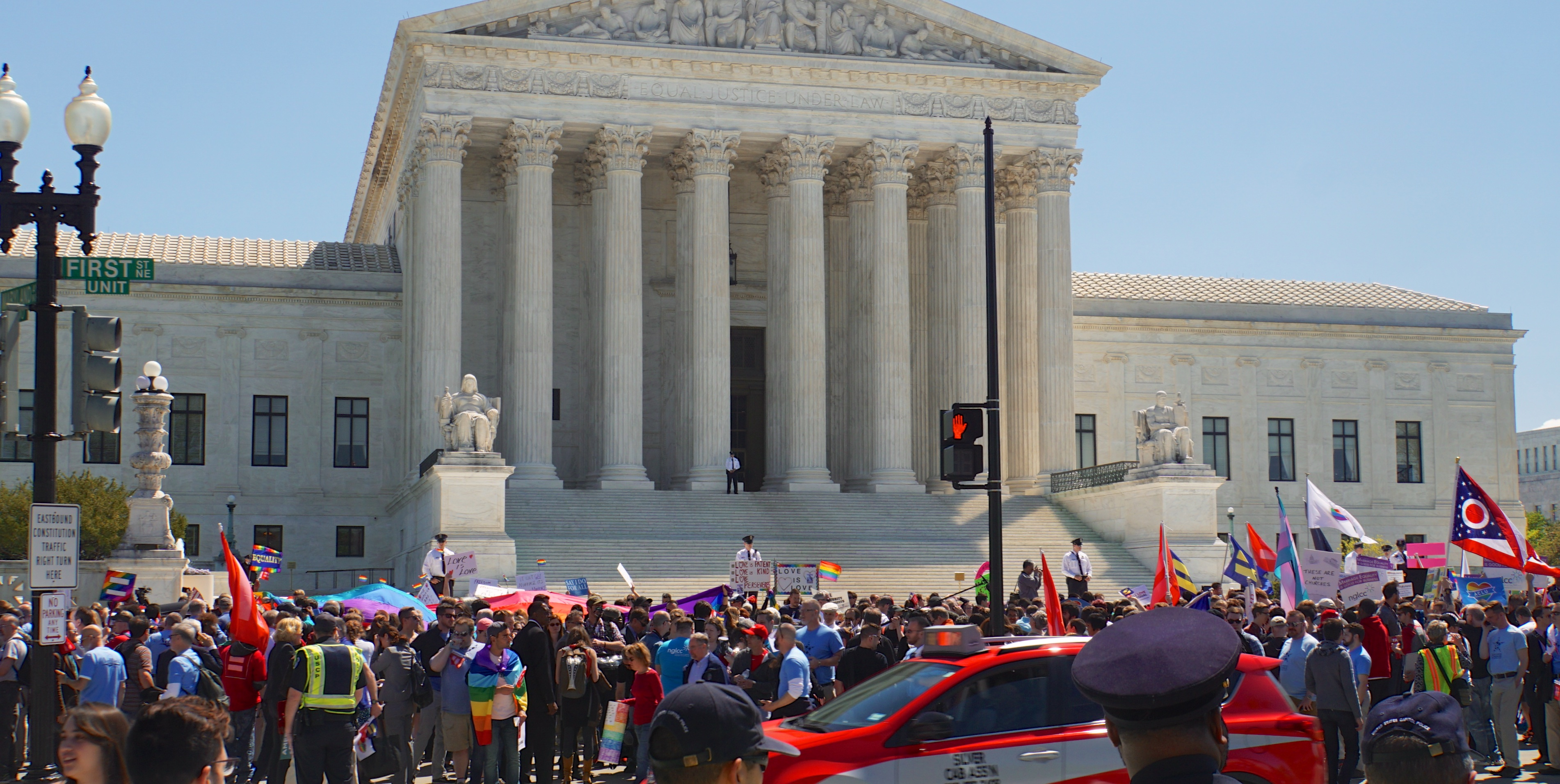
Demonstrations outside the Supreme Court awaiting the decision in Obergefell v. Hodges

In 2015, Scalia dissented from the majority opinion in Obergefell v. Hodges, in which the Court ruled that the fundamental right to marry was guaranteed to same-sex couples by both the Due Process Clause and the Equal Protection Clause of the Fourteenth Amendment. In his dissent, Scalia stated that the Court's decision effectively robbed the people of "the freedom to govern themselves", noting that a rigorous debate on same-sex marriage had been taking place and that—by deciding the issue nationwide—the democratic process had been halted. Addressing the claimed Fourteenth Amendment violation, Scalia asserted that because a same-sex marriage ban would not have been considered unconstitutional at the time of the Fourteenth Amendment's adoption, such bans are not unconstitutional in 2015. He claimed there was "no basis" for the Court to strike down legislation that the Fourteenth Amendment did not expressly forbid, and directly attacked the majority opinion for "lacking even a thin veneer of law". Lastly, Scalia faulted the actual writing in the opinion for "diminish[ing] this Court's reputation for clear thinking and sober analysis" and for "descend[ing] from the disciplined legal reasoning of John Marshall and Joseph Story to the mystical aphorisms of the fortune cookie."

==== Criminal law ====
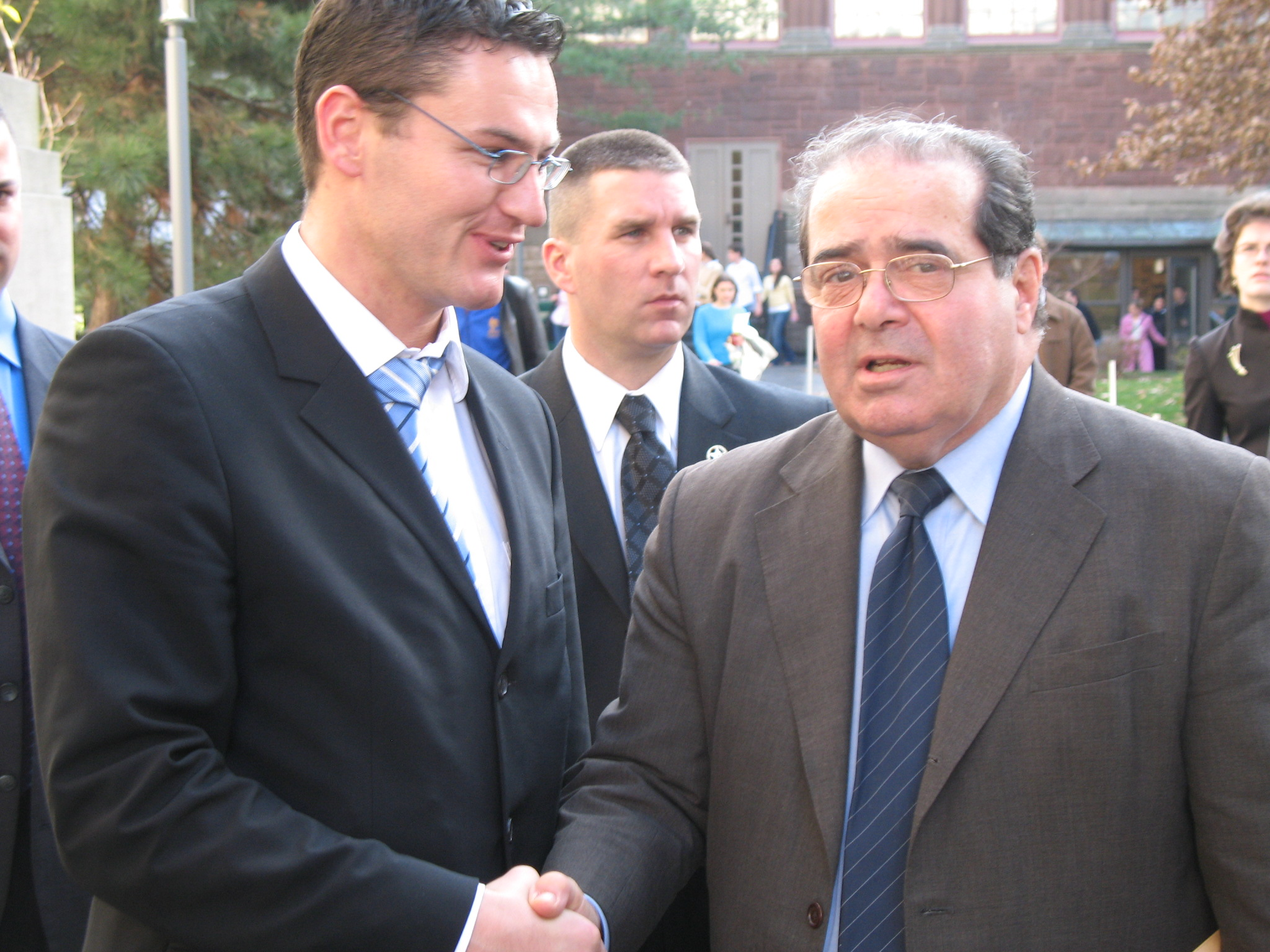
Scalia (right) at Harvard Law School on November 30, 2006

Scalia believed the death penalty to be constitutional. He dissented in decisions that hold the death penalty unconstitutional as applied to certain groups, such as those who were under the age of 18 at the time of offense. In Thompson v. Oklahoma (1988), he dissented from the Court's ruling that the death penalty could not be applied to those aged 15 at the time of the offense, and the following year authored the Court's opinion in Stanford v. Kentucky, sustaining the death penalty for those who killed at age 16. However, in 2005, the Court overturned Stanford in Roper v. Simmons, and Scalia again dissented, mocking the majority's claims that a national consensus had emerged against the execution of those who killed while underage, noting that less than half of the states that permitted the death penalty prohibited it for underage killers. He castigated the majority for including in their count states that had abolished the death penalty entirely, stating that doing so was "rather like including old-order Amishmen in a consumer-preference poll on the electric car. Of course they don't like it, but that sheds no light whatever on the point at issue". In 2002, in Atkins v. Virginia, the Court ruled the death penalty unconstitutional as applied to intellectually disabled people. Scalia dissented, stating that it would not have been considered cruel or unusual to execute mildly intellectually disabled people at the time of the 1791 adoption of the Bill of Rights and that the Court had failed to show that a national consensus had formed against the practice.

Scalia strongly disfavored the Court's ruling in Miranda v. Arizona, which held that a confession by an arrested suspect who had not been advised of their rights was inadmissible in court, and he voted to overrule Miranda in the 2000 case of Dickerson v. United States but was in a minority of two with Justice Clarence Thomas. Calling the Miranda decision a "milestone of judicial overreaching", Scalia stated that the Court should not fear to correct its mistakes.

Although, in many areas, Scalia's approach was unfavorable to criminal defendants, he took the side of defendants in matters involving the Confrontation Clause of the Sixth Amendment, which guarantees defendants the right to confront their accusers. In multiple cases, Scalia wrote against laws that allowed alleged victims of child abuse to testify behind screens or by closed-circuit television. In a 2009 case, Scalia wrote the majority opinion in Melendez-Diaz v. Massachusetts, holding that defendants must have the opportunity to confront lab technicians in drug cases and that a certificate of analysis is not enough to prove a substance was a drug.

Scalia maintained that every element of an offense that helps determine the sentence must be either admitted by the defendant or found by a jury under the Sixth Amendment's jury guarantee. In the 2000 case of Apprendi v. New Jersey, Scalia wrote a concurrence to the Court's majority opinion that struck down a state statute that allowed the trial judge to increase the sentence if the judge found the offense was a hate crime. Scalia found the procedure impermissible because whether it was a hate crime had not been decided by the jury. In 2004, he wrote for the Court in Blakely v. Washington, striking down Washington state's sentencing guidelines on similar grounds. The dissenters in Blakely foresaw that Scalia would use the case to attack the federal sentencing guidelines (which he had failed to strike down in Mistretta), and they proved correct, as Scalia led a five-member majority in United States v. Booker, which made those guidelines no longer mandatory for federal judges to follow (they remained advisory).

In the 2001 case of Kyllo v. United States, Scalia wrote the Court's opinion in a 5–4 decision that cut across ideological lines. (Note: Scalia was joined by Justices Thomas, Souter, Breyer, and Ginsburg.) That decision found thermal imaging of a home to be an unreasonable search under the Fourth Amendment. The Court struck down a conviction for marijuana manufacture based on a search warrant issued after such scans were conducted, which showed that the garage was considerably hotter than the rest of the house because of indoor growing lights. Applying that Fourth Amendment prohibition on unreasonable search and seizure to arrest, Scalia dissented from the Court's 1991 decision in County of Riverside v. McLaughlin, allowing a 48-hour delay before a person arrested without a warrant is taken before a magistrate, on the ground that at the time of the adoption of the Fourth Amendment, an arrested person was to be taken before a magistrate as quickly as practicable. In a 1990 First Amendment case, R.A.V. v. St. Paul, Scalia wrote the Court's opinion striking down a St. Paul, Minnesota, hate speech ordinance in a prosecution for burning a cross. Scalia noted, "Let there be no mistake about our belief that burning a cross in someone's front yard is reprehensible. But St. Paul has sufficient means at its disposal to prevent such behavior without adding the First Amendment to the fire".

==== Second Amendment ====
"Undoubtedly some think that the Second Amendment is outmoded in a society where our standing army is the pride of our Nation, where well-trained police forces provide personal security, and where gun violence is a serious problem. That is perhaps debatable, but what is not debatable is that it is not the role of this Court to pronounce the Second Amendment extinct."

— Scalia, writing for the majority in District of Columbia v. Heller

In 2008, the Court considered a challenge to the gun laws in the District of Columbia. Scalia wrote the majority opinion in District of Columbia v. Heller, which found an individual right to own a firearm under the Second Amendment. Scalia traced the word "militia", found in the Second Amendment, as it would have been understood at the time of its ratification, stating that it then meant "the body of all citizens". The Court upheld Heller's claim to own a firearm in the District.

Scalia's opinion for the Heller Court was criticized by liberals and applauded by conservatives. Seventh Circuit judge Richard Posner disagreed with Scalia's opinion, stating that the Second Amendment "creates no right to the private possession of guns". Posner called Scalia's opinion "faux originalism" and a "historicizing glaze on personal values and policy preferences". In October 2008, Scalia stated that the court's originalists needed to show only that at the time the Second Amendment was ratified, the right to bear arms did not have an exclusively military context and that they were successful in so showing.

==== Litigation and standing ====
Following the death of Scalia, Paul Barrett, writing for Bloomberg Businessweek, reported that: "Translating into liberal argot: Scalia changed the rules for who could sue". The issue elevated the recognition of Scalia as a notable influence on establishing and determining the conditions under which cases could be brought to trial and for litigation—and by whom such litigation could take place. David Rivkin, from the conservative standpoint, said, "He (Scalia) did more to clarify and limit the bounds and scope of judicial power than any Supreme Court Justice in history, particularly in the area of standing and class actions". Scalia indicated his long-held position from the time of his 1983 law review article titled "The Doctrine of Standing as an Essential Element of the Separation of Powers". As summarized by Barrett, "He (Scalia) wrote that courts had misappropriated authority from other branches of government by allowing too many people to sue corporations and government agencies, especially in environmental cases". In a practical sense, Scalia brought to the attention of the Court the authority to restrict "standing" in class action suits in which the litigants may be defined in descriptive terms rather than as well-defined and unambiguous litigants.

=== Other cases ===
Scalia concurred in the 1990 case of Cruzan v. Director, Missouri Department of Health, in which the family of a woman in a vegetative state sought to have her feeding tube removed so she would die, believing that to have been her wish. The Court found for the State of Missouri, requiring clear and convincing evidence of such a desire. Scalia stated that the Court should have remained away from the dispute and that the issues "are [not] better known to the nine Justices of this Court any better than they are known to nine people picked at random from the Kansas City telephone directory".

Scalia joined the majority per curiam opinion in the 2000 case of Bush v. Gore, which effectively ended recounts of ballots in Florida following the 2000 US presidential election, and also both concurred separately and joined Rehnquist's concurrence. In 2007, he said of the case, "I and my court owe no apology whatever for Bush v. Gore. We did the right thing. So there! ... get over it. It's so old by now". During an interview on the Charlie Rose show, he defended the Court's action:

The decision was not close, it was 7–2 on the principal issue of whether there had been a constitutional violation ... But what if it was unconstitutional to have that recount? You're going to let it continue and come to a conclusion? And then overturn it? The reason to stop it sooner was not, "Ooh, we're worried that it's going to come out the wrong way"... you forget what was going on at the time. We were the laughingstock of the world. The world's greatest democracy that couldn't conduct an election. We didn't know who our next president was going to be. The lengthy transition that has become standard when you change from one president to another could not begin because you didn't know who the new president was going to be. It was becoming a very serious problem. The issue before the United States Supreme Court is: having decided the case, having decided this is unconstitutional, should we nonetheless let the election go on? Or is it time cut it off and let's move on?

== Legal philosophy and approach ==
=== Judicial performance ===
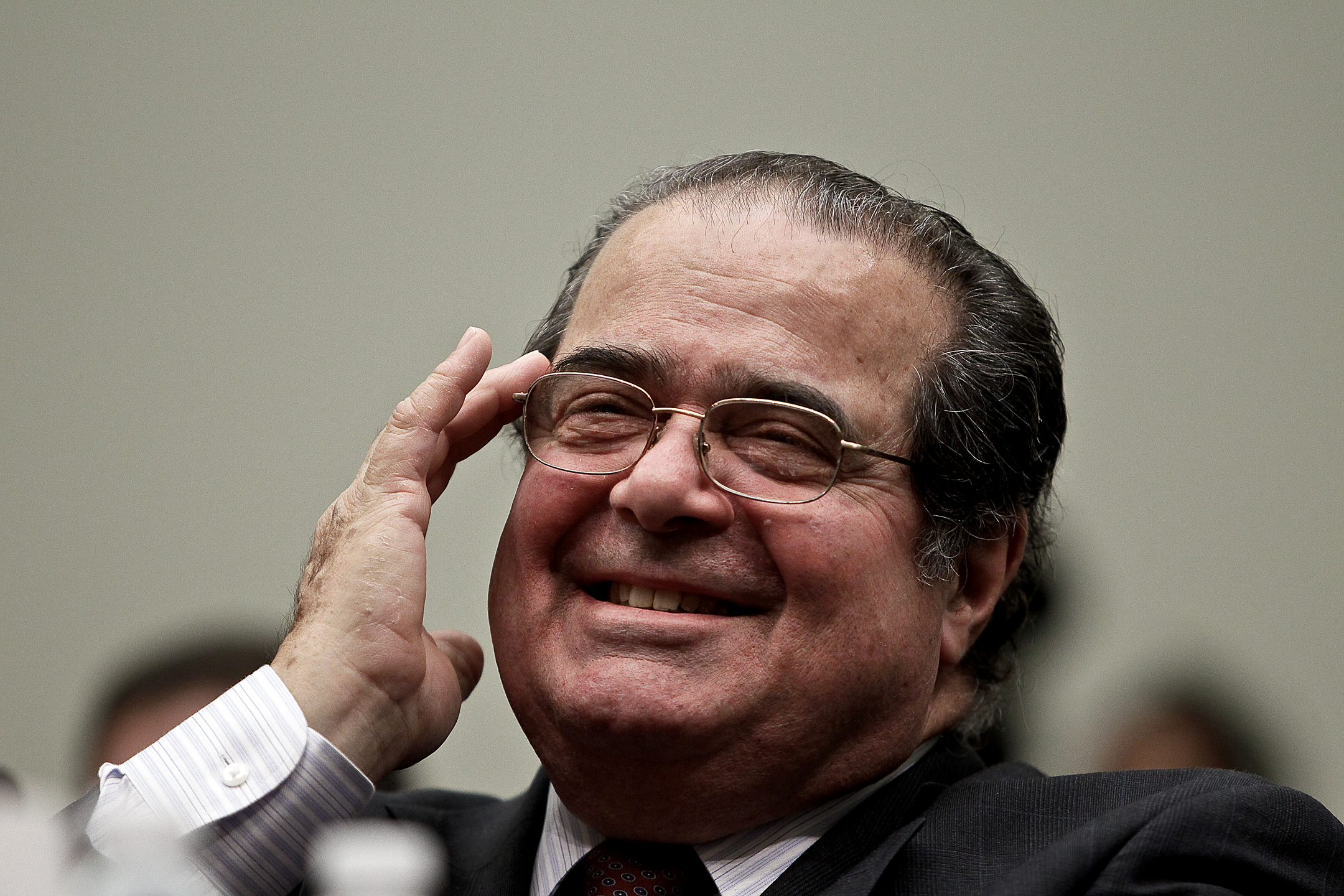
Scalia in 2010

During oral argument before the Court, Scalia asked more questions and made more comments than any other justice. A 2005 study found that he provoked laughter more often than any of his colleagues did. His goal during oral arguments was to get across his position to the other justices. University of Kansas social psychologist Lawrence Wrightsman wrote that Scalia communicated "a sense of urgency on the bench" and had a style that was "forever forceful". After Chief Justice John Roberts joined the Court in 2005, he took to quizzing lawyers in a manner similar to Scalia's; sometimes the two questioned counsel in seeming coordination. Dahlia Lithwick of Slate described Scalia's technique as follows:

Scalia doesn't come into oral argument all secretive and sphinxlike, feigning indecision on the nuances of the case before him. He comes in like a medieval knight, girded for battle. He knows what the law is. He knows what the opinion should say. And he uses the hour allocated for argument to bludgeon his brethren into agreement.

Scalia wrote numerous opinions from the start of his career on the Supreme Court. During his tenure, he wrote more concurring opinions than any other justice. Only two other justices have written more dissents. According to Kevin Ring, who compiled a book of Scalia's dissenting and concurring opinions: "His opinions are ... highly readable. His entertaining writing style can make even the most mundane areas of the law interesting". Conor Clarke of Slate comments on Scalia's written opinions, especially his dissents:

His writing style is best described as equal parts anger, confidence, and pageantry. Scalia has a taste for garish analogies and offbeat allusions—often very funny ones—and he speaks in no uncertain terms. He is highly accessible and tries not to get bogged down in abstruse legal jargon. But most of all, Scalia's opinions read like they're about to catch fire for pure outrage. He does not, in short, write like a happy man.

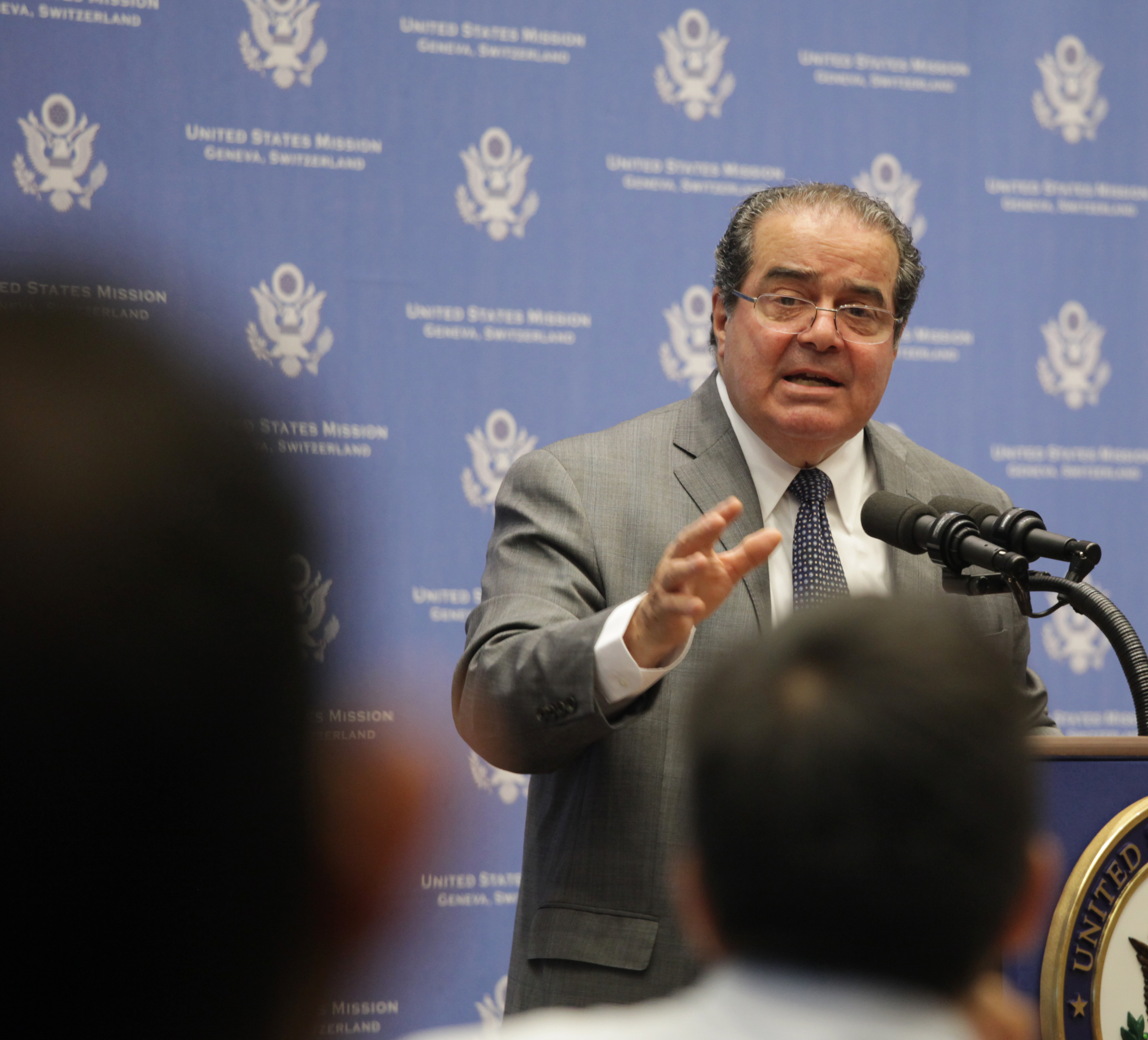
Scalia speaks at the US mission within Geneva in 2011.

At the Supreme Court, justices meet after the case is briefed and argued and vote on the result. The task of writing the opinion is assigned by the Chief Justice or—if the Chief Justice is in the minority or is not participating—by the senior justice in the majority. After the assignment, the justices generally communicate about a case by sending notes and draft opinions to each other's chambers. In the give-and-take of opinion-writing, Scalia did not compromise his views in order to attract five votes for a majority (unlike the late Justice William J. Brennan, Jr., who would accept less than what he wanted in order to gain a partial victory). Scalia attempted to influence his colleagues by sending them "Ninograms"—short memoranda aimed at persuading them of the correctness of his views.

In an October 2013 issue of New York magazine, Scalia revealed that he scanned The Wall Street Journal and The Washington Times, obtained most of his news from talk radio, and did not read The New York Times or The Washington Post. He described The Washington Post as "shrilly liberal".

=== Textualism ===
Scalia was a textualist in statutory interpretation, believing that the ordinary meaning of a statute should govern. In interpreting statutes, Scalia did not look to legislative history. In the 2006 case of Zedner v. United States, he joined the majority opinion written by Justice Samuel Alito—all except one paragraph of the opinion, in which Alito cited legislative history. In a concurring opinion in that case, Scalia noted, "The use of legislative history is illegitimate and ill advised in the interpretation of any statute". His dislike of legislative history may have been a reason that other justices have become more cautious in its use. Gregory Maggs wrote in the Public Interest Law Review in 1995 that by the early 1990s, legislative history was being cited in only about forty percent of Supreme Court cases involving the interpretation of statutes and that no case of that era used legislative history as an essential reason for the outcome. Maggs suggested:

With Justice Scalia breathing down the necks of anyone who peeks into the Congressional Record or Senate reports, the other members of the Court may have concluded that the benefit of citing legislative history does not outweigh its costs. It is likely for this reason that the percentage of cases citing it has decreased dramatically. No one likes an unnecessary fight, especially not one with as formidable an opponent as Justice Scalia.

=== Originalism ===
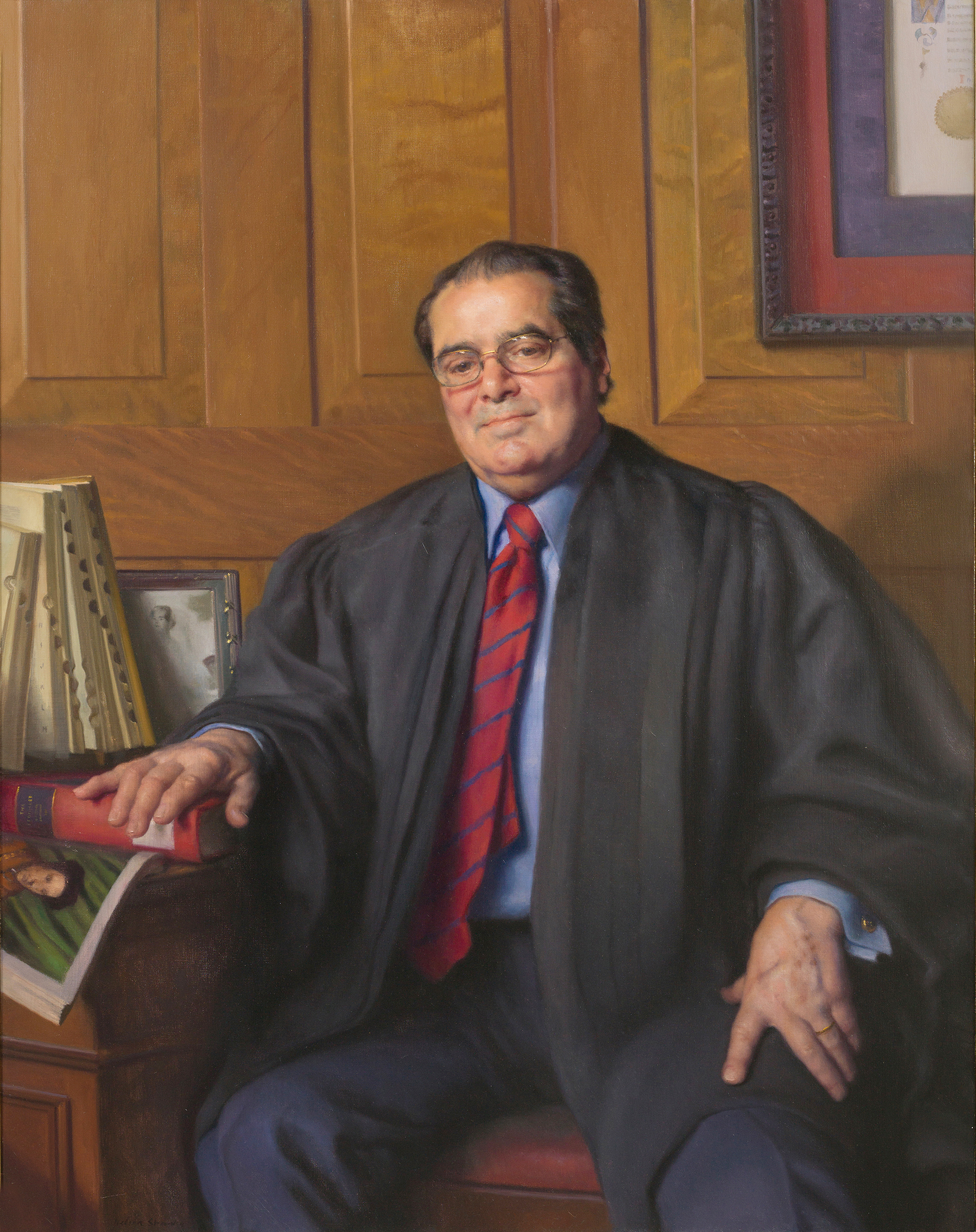
Scalia's official Supreme Court portrait by Nelson Shanks

In 1998, Scalia vociferously opposed the idea of a living constitution, or the power of the judiciary to modify the meaning of constitutional provisions to adapt them to changing times. Scalia warned that if one accepted that constitutional standards should evolve with a maturing society, "the risk of assessing evolving standards is that it is all too easy to believe that evolution has culminated in one's own views". He compared the Constitution to statutes he contended were not understood to change their meaning through time. Scalia described himself as an originalist, meaning that he interpreted the United States Constitution as it would have been understood when it was adopted. According to Scalia in 2008, "It's what did the words mean to the people who ratified the Bill of Rights or who ratified the Constitution".

Constitutional amendments, such as the 1868 Fourteenth Amendment, according to Scalia, were to be interpreted based on their meaning at the time of ratification. Scalia was often asked how that approach justified the result in the 1954 case of Brown v. Board of Education, which held that segregated schools were unconstitutional and which relied on the Fourteenth Amendment for the result. Scalia responded to this argument in two ways. He noted research by Michael McConell that "persuasively establishes that this was the original understanding of the post Civil War Amendments." However, Scalia continues by arguing that even if non-originalist methods occasionally produce better results than originalism, "It is in no way remarkable... that taking power from the people and placing it instead with a judicial aristocracy can produce some creditable results that democracy might not achieve. The same can be said of monarchy and totalitarianism. But once a nation has decided that democracy... is the best system of government, the crucial question becomes which theory of textual interpretation is compatible with democracy. Originalism unquestionably is. Non-originalism, by contrast, imposes on society statutory prescriptions that were never democratically adopted. When applied to the Constitution, nonoriginalism limits the democratic process itself, prohibiting... acts... that 'We The People' never, ever, voted to outlaw". In a 2009 public conversation, Justice Stephen Breyer questioned Scalia, indicating that those who ratified the Fourteenth Amendment did not intend to end school segregation. Scalia called this argument "waving the bloody shirt of Brown" and indicated that he would have joined the first Justice Harlan's solitary dissent in Plessy v. Ferguson, the 1896 case that Brown overruled.

Scalia's originalist approach came under attack from critics, who viewed it as "a cover for what they see as Scalia's real intention: to turn back some pivotal court decisions of the 1960s and 70s" reached by the Warren and Burger Courts. Ralph Nader argued in 2008 that Scalia's originalist philosophy was inconsistent with the justice's acceptance of the extension of certain constitutional rights to corporations when at the time of the Fourteenth Amendment's ratification, corporations were not commonly understood to possess constitutional rights. Nader's view preceded the Court's 2010 decision in Citizens United v. Federal Election Commission. Scalia, in his concurrence in that case, traced his understanding of the rights of groups of individuals at the time of the adoption of the Bill of Rights. His argument was based on the lack of an exception for groups such as corporations in the free speech guarantee in the Bill of Rights and on several examples of corporate political speech from the time of the adoption of the Bill of Rights. Professor Thomas Colby of George Washington University National Law Center argued that Scalia's votes in Establishment Clause cases do not stem from originalist views but simply from conservative political convictions. Scalia responded to his critics that his originalism "has occasionally led him to decisions he deplores, like his upholding the constitutionality of flag burning", which according to Scalia was protected by the First Amendment.

In 2006, before George W. Bush appointees Roberts and Alito had had time to make an impact, Rossum wrote that Scalia had failed to win converts among his conservative colleagues for his use of originalism, whereas Roberts and Alito, as younger men with an originalist approach, greatly admired Scalia battling for what he believed in. Following the appointments of Roberts and Alito, subsequent appointees Neil Gorsuch and Brett Kavanaugh are identified in their judicial temperament as being originalists with Kavanaugh referred to as "a stalwart originalist" in the tradition of Scalia.

== Public attention ==
=== Requests for recusals ===
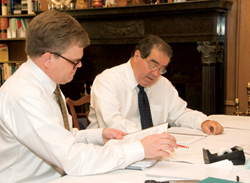
Scalia (right) works on a book with lexicographer Bryan A. Garner.

Scalia recused himself from Elk Grove Unified School District v. Newdow (2004), a case brought by atheist Michael Newdow alleging that recitation of the Pledge of Allegiance (including the words "under God") in school classrooms violated the rights of his daughter, who he said was also an atheist. Shortly after the United States Court of Appeals for the Ninth Circuit ruled in Newdow's favor but before the case came before the Supreme Court, Scalia spoke at a Knights of Columbus event in Fredericksburg, Virginia, stating that the Ninth Circuit decision was an example of how the courts were trying to excise God from public life. The school district requested that the Supreme Court review the case, and Newdow asked that Scalia recuse himself because of this prior statement, which he did without comment.

Scalia declined to recuse himself from Cheney v. United States District Court for the District of Columbia (2005), a case concerning whether Vice President Dick Cheney could keep secret the membership of an advisory task force on energy policy. Scalia was asked to recuse himself because he had gone on a hunting trip with various persons including Cheney, during which he traveled one way on Air Force Two. Scalia issued a lengthy in-chambers opinion refusing to recuse himself, stating that though Cheney was a longtime friend, he was being sued merely in his official capacity and that were justices to step aside in the cases of officials who are parties because of official capacity, the Supreme Court would cease to function. Scalia indicated that it was far from unusual for justices to socialize with other government officials, recalling that the late Chief Justice Fred M. Vinson played poker with President Harry Truman and that Justice Byron White went skiing with Attorney General Robert F. Kennedy. Scalia stated that he was never alone with Cheney during the trip, the two had not discussed the case, and the justice had saved no money because he had bought round-trip tickets, the cheapest available. Scalia was part of the 7–2 majority once the case was heard, a decision that generally upheld Cheney's position. Scalia later described his refusal to recuse himself as his "most heroic opinion" because it had exposed him to a great deal of criticism.

Judge Gilbert S. Merritt Jr. of the Sixth Circuit Court of Appeals called for Scalia's recusal in Bush v. Gore at the time. Walter Sinnott-Armstrong, writing in Law and Philosophy, later chronicled such calls and contended that "There were many ways for Justice Scalia's sons to benefit from a decision in favor of Bush. Together these benefits could be substantial. Hence, [the law] required recusal". Republicans dismissed such calls as partisan, noting that Merritt was a close friend of the Gores and a rumored Gore Supreme Court nominee.

=== Religious views ===
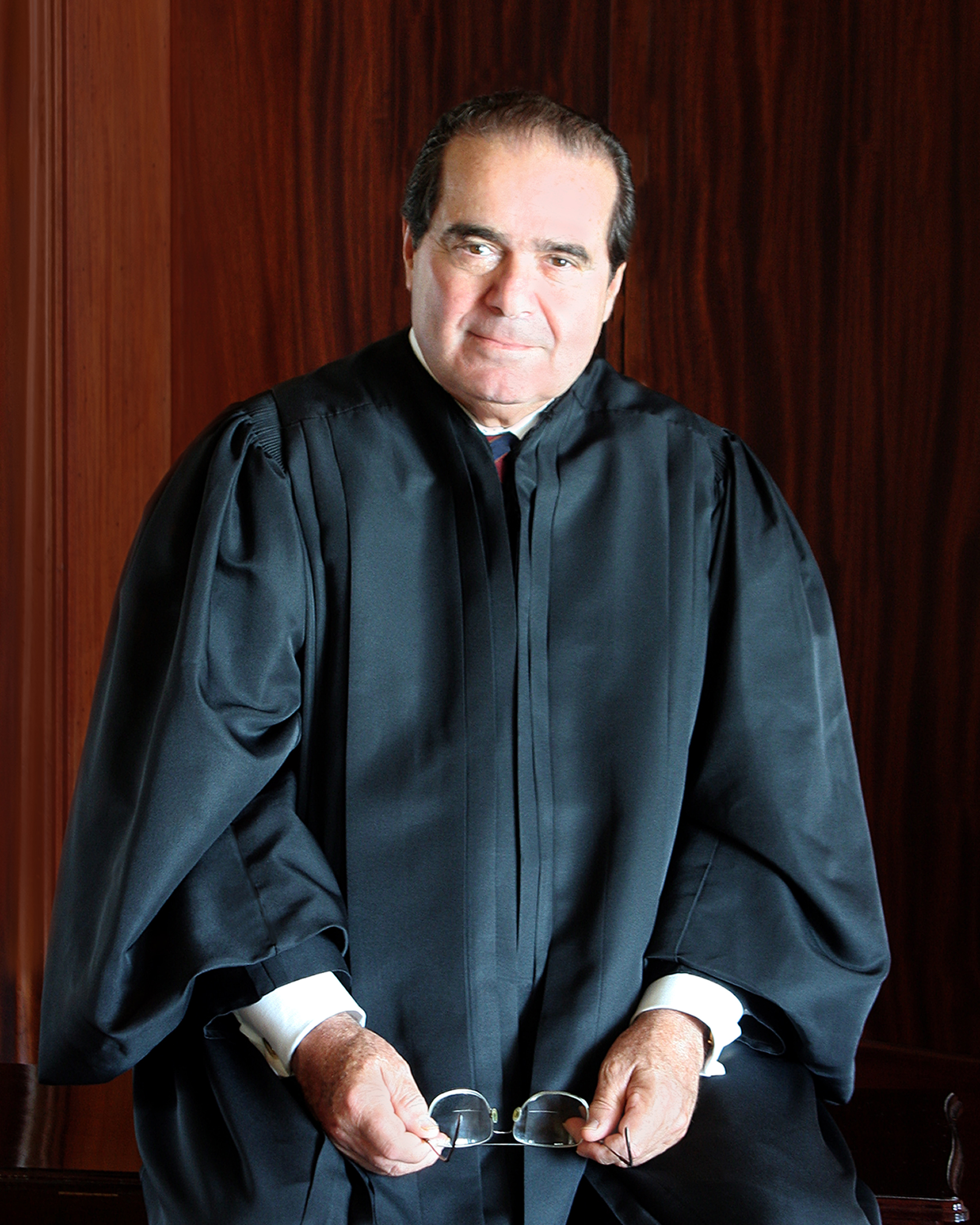
Scalia's official portrait, 2005

Scalia was a devout traditionalist Catholic, and his son Paul entered the priesthood. Uncomfortable with the changes brought about following Vatican II, Scalia drove long distances to parishes he felt were more in accord with his beliefs, including parishes that celebrated the Tridentine Latin Mass in Chicago and Washington, and one celebrating the Latin version of the Mass of Paul VI at St. Catherine of Siena in Great Falls, Virginia. In a 2013 interview with Jennifer Senior for New York, Scalia was asked whether his beliefs extended to the Devil, and he stated, "Of course! Yeah, he's a real person. Hey, c'mon, that's standard Catholic doctrine! Every Catholic believes that." When asked whether he had seen recent evidence of the Devil, Scalia replied: "You know, it is curious. In the Gospels, the Devil is doing all sorts of things. He's making pigs run off cliffs, he's possessing people and whatnot ... What he's doing now is getting people not to believe in him or in God. He's much more successful that way." In another 2013 interview to the Houston Chronicle, Scalia said, "In order for capitalism to work, in order for it to produce a good and stable society, traditional Christian virtues are essential."

In 2006, upon leaving church, Scalia was asked by a reporter whether being a traditionalist Catholic had caused problems for him, and he responded by asking, "You know what I say to those people?" and with a gesture, cupping his hand under his chin and flicking his fingers out. The gesture, which got captured by a photographer, was initially reported by the Boston Herald as obscene. Scalia responded to the reports with a letter to the editor, accusing the news staff of watching too many episodes of The Sopranos and stating that the gesture was a strong brush-off. Roger Axtell, an expert on body language, described the gesture as possibly meaning "I've had enough, go away" and noted, "It's a fairly strong gesture". The gesture was parodied by comedian Stephen Colbert during his performance at the White House Correspondents' Association Dinner later that year, with the justice in attendance; cameras showed that, unlike most of the butts of Colbert's jokes that evening, Scalia was laughing.

=== 1996 presidential election ===
According to John Boehner, as chairman of the House Republican Conference, he sought to persuade Scalia to run for election as vice president with Bob Dole in 1996. As related by Boehner, Scalia listened to the proposal and dictated the same reply Justice Charles Evans Hughes had once given to a similar query: "The possibility is too remote to comment upon, given my position". Dole did put Scalia on his list of potential running mates but eventually decided upon Jack Kemp.

== Personal life ==
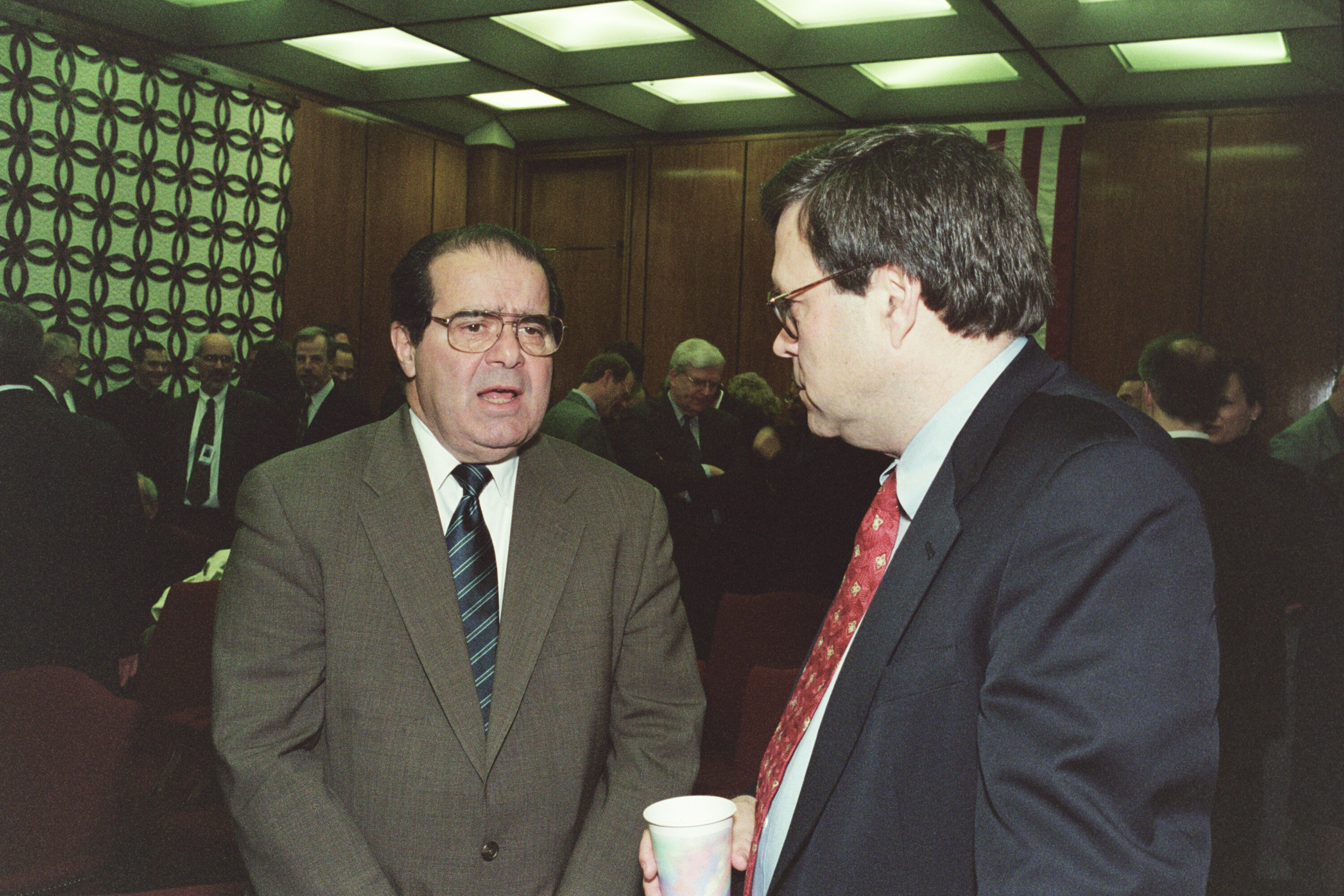
Scalia (left) and William Barr (right) at the swearing-in of his son, Eugene Scalia, as Solicitor of Labor on February 25, 2002

On September 10, 1960, Scalia married Maureen McCarthy at St. Pius X church in Yarmouth, Massachusetts. The two had met on a blind date while he was at Harvard Law School. Maureen was an undergraduate student at Radcliffe College when they met; she subsequently obtained a degree in English from the school.

The Scalias had five sons and four daughters. Two of their sons, Eugene Scalia and John Scalia, became attorneys, with Eugene later becoming Secretary of Labor in the first Trump administration. Paul Scalia became a Catholic priest, Matthew Scalia had a military career, and Christopher Scalia became a writer. All four Scalia daughters—Catherine, Ann, Margaret, and Mary—have families. According to Scalia, Maureen raised all nine children "with very little assistance from me". The family resided in McLean, Virginia, a suburb of Washington, D.C.

Scalia had a close friendship with fellow justice Ruth Bader Ginsburg—a member of the court's liberal wing—and the two attended the opera together and appeared together onstage as supernumeraries in Washington National Opera's 1994 production of Ariadne auf Naxos. Ginsburg was a colleague of Scalia on the D.C. Circuit, and the Scalias and Ginsburgs had dinner together every New Year's Eve.

Scalia also enjoyed a friendship with fellow Justice Elena Kagan, also considered a member of the court's liberal wing. When Justice David Souter retired, Scalia told David Axelrod, an adviser to then-President Barack Obama, that he hoped that Obama would nominate Kagan to replace him. While Obama nominated Sonia Sotomayor instead, a year later when Justice John Paul Stevens retired, Obama nominated Kagan. An avid hunter, Scalia taught Justice Kagan how to hunt; the two hunted ducks, birds, deer and antelope together.

=== Death and funeral ===
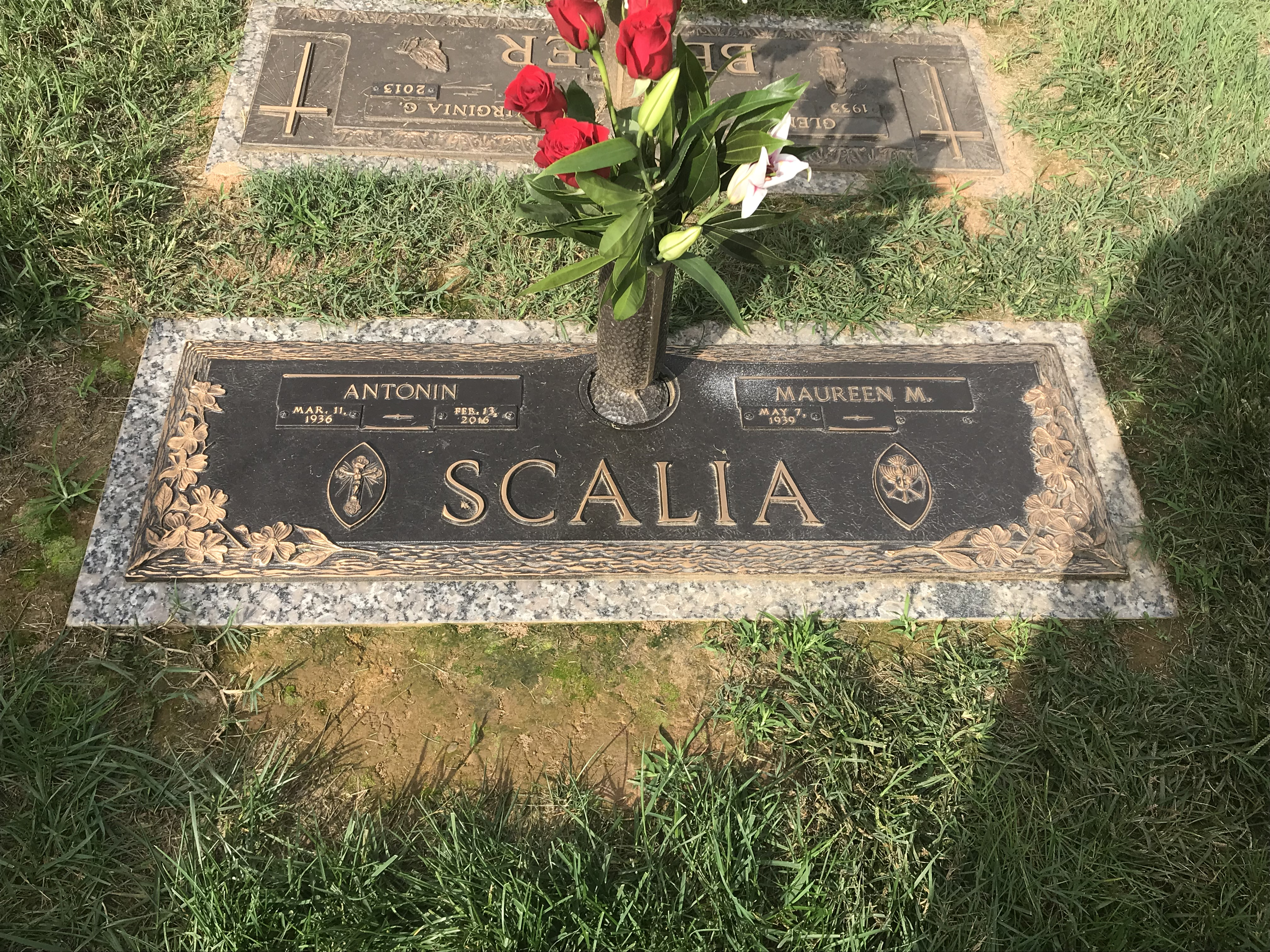
Scalia's gravesite at Fairfax Memorial Park

Scalia died in his sleep at age 79. His body was discovered on the morning of February 13, 2016, in his room at Cibolo Creek Ranch, near Shafter, Texas in Presidio County, Texas. He had gone quail hunting the afternoon before, and then dined as the guest of John B. Poindexter, owner of the ranch. After Poindexter discovered the body, he called the Presidio County sheriff's department to ask for the number of the U.S. Marshals Service to report a death. Poindexter was reluctant to say who had died to Sheriff Danny Dominguez. Dominguez had the Marshal's Service call the ranch owner, and both the marshals and the sheriff went to the ranch, where they were shown Scalia's body. Dominguez instructed his office to call local justice of the peace Juanita Bishop, but she was out of town.

County judge Cinderela Guevara pronounced Scalia dead of natural causes. She did not see the body, which under Texas law is not required, nor did she order an autopsy. Bishop, as well as David Beebe, another justice of the peace, later disagreed with the decision not to order an autopsy for Scalia. Guevara, who conferred by telephone with Scalia's physician, stated that she made the determination to pronounce Scalia dead from natural causes after being told by county sheriff Dominguez on the scene that "there were no signs of foul play" and that Scalia "was having health issues". Scalia's physician, Rear Admiral Brian P. Monahan, told her Scalia had a history of heart trouble, including high blood pressure, and was recently deemed too weak to undergo surgery for a torn rotator cuff. According to Sunset Funeral Home director Chris Lujan, Scalia's family also declined to have an autopsy performed after his body was transferred to his El Paso funeral home, prior to its return to Fairfax, Virginia.

Justice Scalia's last majority opinion was Kansas v. Carr (2016), and his last dissenting opinion and last overall was FERC v. Electric Power Supply Association (2016). Following his death, Scalia lay in repose in the Great Hall of the United States Supreme Court Building on February 19, 2016. Scalia's son, Father Paul Scalia, celebrated a Catholic funeral Mass and delivered the homily on February 20, 2016, at the Basilica of the National Shrine of the Immaculate Conception in Washington, D.C. The Obama administration was represented at the funeral by Vice President Joe Biden; President Barack Obama did not attend. Scalia's remains were interred at a private ceremony at Fairfax Memorial Park in Fairfax, Virginia.

==== Conspiracy theories ====
The circumstances surrounding Scalia's death prompted conspiracy theories alleging that he may have been murdered. These conspiracy theories were stimulated by Guevara's decision not to conduct an autopsy and her pronouncement of Scalia's death by a phone call, as well as by Scalia's refusal of a United States Marshals Service security detail, uncertainty over the precise cause of Scalia's death, and Poindexter's initial assertion that he found Scalia in bed with a pillow over his head. Poindexter later clarified that the pillow was in between Scalia's head and the bed's headboard, not over his face. The conspiracy theory was promoted by William Ritchie, a former head of criminal investigations for the Metropolitan Police Department of the District of Columbia, and by Alex Jones, a far-right talk show host. Donald Trump, then a candidate for the Republican presidential nomination, referenced the homicide allegations on Michael Savage's radio show The Savage Nation, saying that "they say they found a pillow on his face, which is a pretty unusual place to find a pillow." Eugene Scalia rejected the theories, saying that "our family just has no doubt that he was taken from us by natural causes."

== Legacy ==
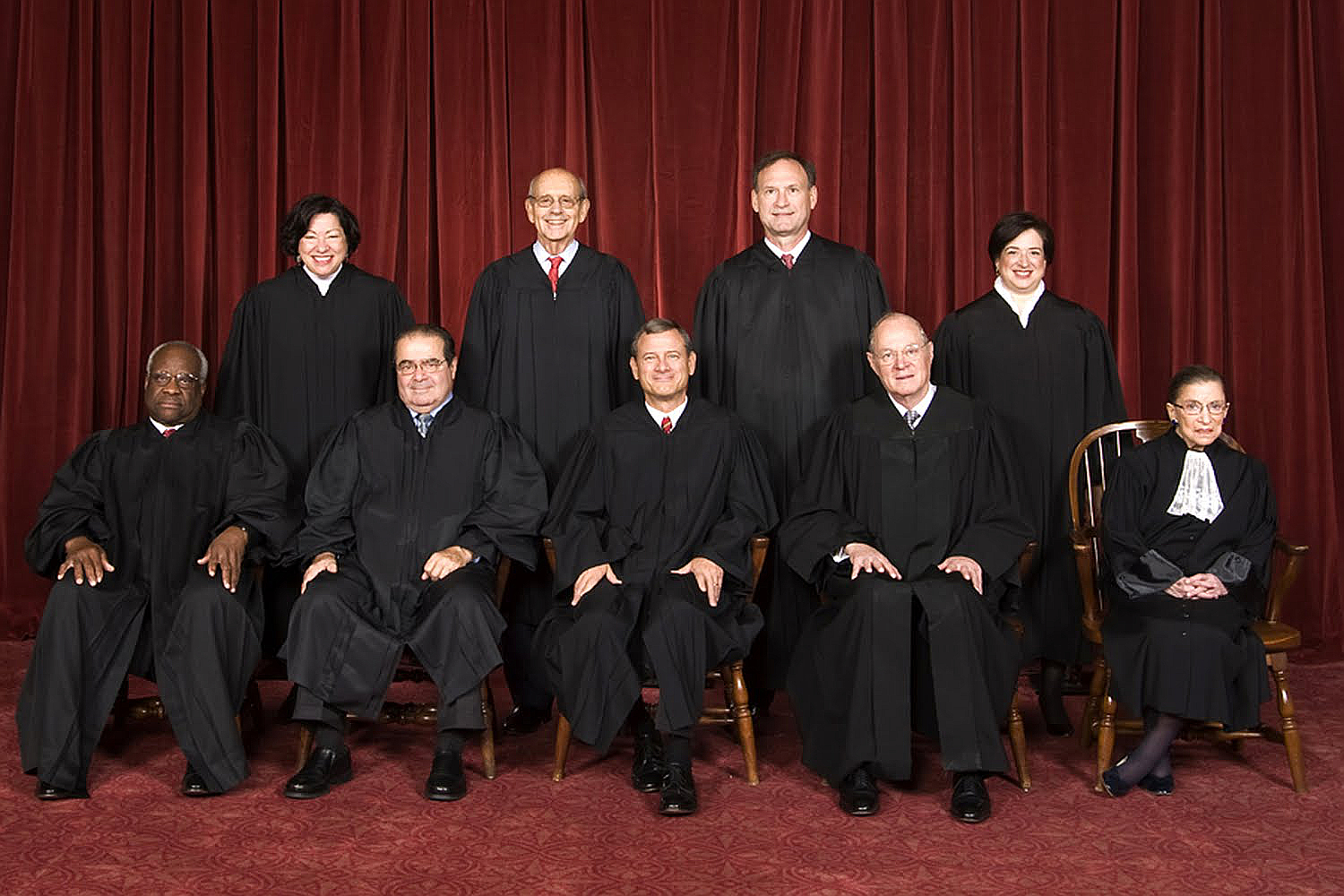
The Roberts Court (October 2010 – February 2016). Front row: Clarence Thomas, Antonin Scalia, John Roberts (Chief), Anthony Kennedy, Ruth Bader Ginsburg. Back row: Sonia Sotomayor, Stephen Breyer, Samuel Alito, Elena Kagan.

=== Influence ===
Writing in The Jewish Daily Forward in 2009, J. J. Goldberg described Scalia as "the intellectual anchor of the court's conservative majority". Scalia traveled to the nation's law schools, giving talks on law and democracy. His appearances on college campuses were often standing room only. Justice Ruth Bader Ginsburg indicated that Scalia was "very much in tune with the current generation of law students ... Students now put 'Federalist Society' on their resumes". Justice John Paul Stevens, who served throughout Scalia's tenure until his 2010 retirement, said of Scalia's influence, "He's made a huge difference. Some of it constructive, some of it unfortunate". Of the nine sitting justices, Scalia was most often the subject of law review articles.

In 2009, after nearly a quarter century on the Court, Scalia characterized his victories as "damn few".

Writing in The American Spectator, Adam Carrington noted that:

Since his death in February of 2016, Scalia's influence of course continues through his three decades of judicial opinions. But he still exerts great influence in another, less-discussed way. In 2012, he co-authored the book Reading Law: The Interpretation of Legal Texts with Bryan A. Garner. This work describes numerous "canons," or rules regarding how to interpret legal documents ... A mere seven years since its publication, Reading Law has been cited in over 1,000 state and federal cases. Just this spring, for instance, Supreme Court justices referenced the work in 10 cases.

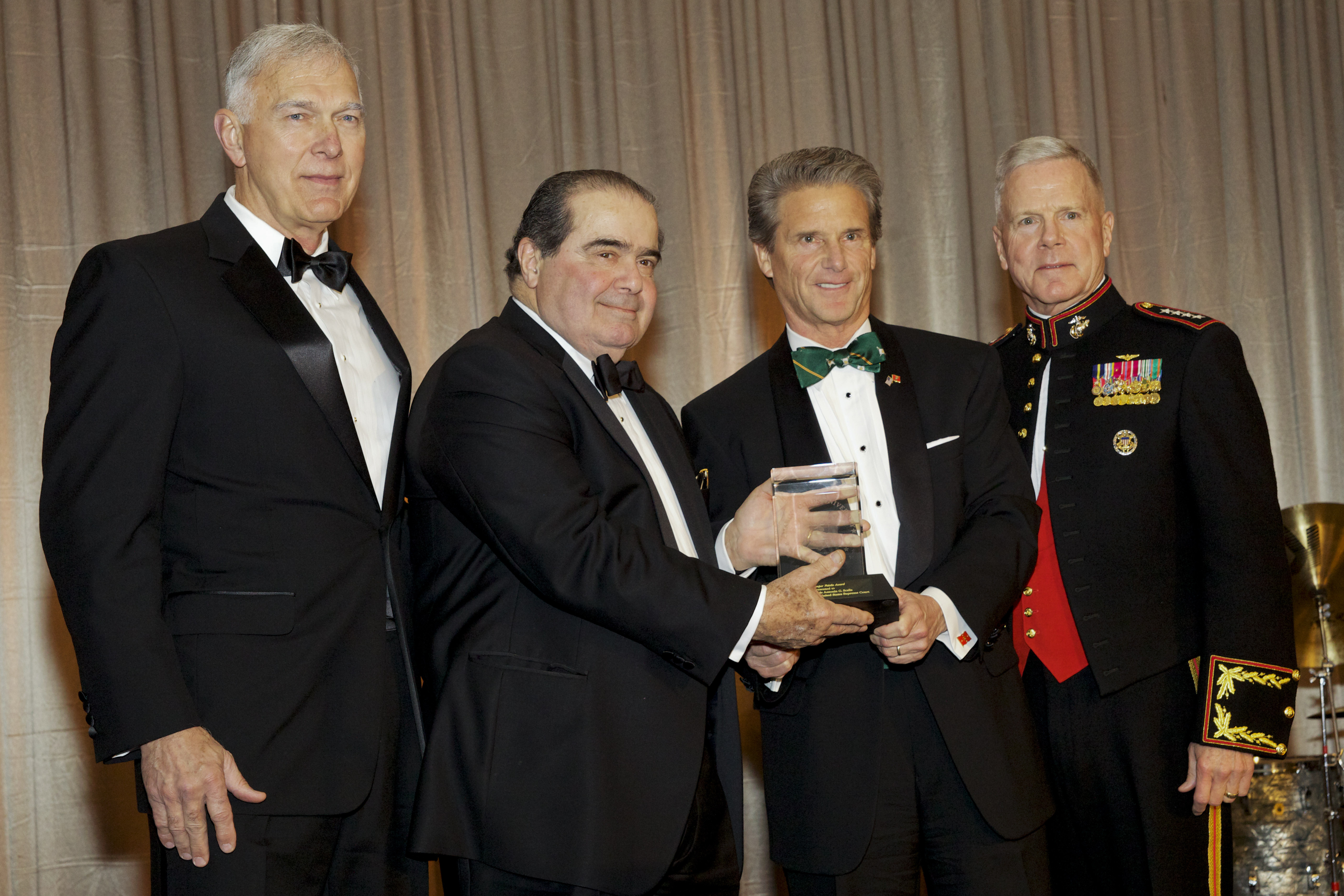
Scalia accepts the Semper Fidelis Award, 2013

Scalia's promotion of textualism and originalism on the high court led to a shift in the American judiciary's approach to textual interpretation, with greater attention paid to the text itself. The liberal political philosopher Ronald Dworkin said that because of Scalia, "we are all originalists now." For this reason, he is often described as one of the most influential jurists of the twentieth century. Justice Elena Kagan echoed the comment in her 2010 confirmation hearing, and declared in a 2015 interview at Harvard Law School honoring her then-colleague Scalia that "we are all textualists now." In 2017, Harvard University established an endowed professorship at its law school dedicated in honor of Scalia; as of July 1, 2021, it is occupied by Stephen E. Sachs.

=== In popular culture ===
Derrick Wang's opera Scalia/Ginsburg depicts the friendship of Scalia and Justice Ruth Bader Ginsburg, both known for their shared love of opera. The opera was introduced before Scalia and Ginsburg at the Supreme Court in 2013, premiered at the Castleton Festival in 2015, and was revised after Scalia's death, with the revised version broadcast on national radio on November 7, 2020. Scalia and Ginsburg both wrote forewords to the libretto, and Ginsburg cited the opera in her statement on Scalia's death and in her foreword to the book Scalia Speaks.

John Strand's play The Originalist was performed in Washington, DC in 2015; it received a positive review from The New York Times. The play depicted Justice Scalia's interaction with a (fictional) liberal court clerk and their mutual criticism and eventual support of each other. The play had a cross-country tour from Washington, D.C. to the Pasadena Playhouse. The play aired on PBS in 2017.

=== Posthumous tributes ===
According to NBC News, tributes to "larger-than-life Supreme Court Justice Antonin Scalia poured in [from] both sides of the political aisle" following his death. President Barack Obama called Scalia "one of the towering legal figures of our time" and former president George W. Bush described Scalia as "a brilliant jurist". U.S. attorney general Loretta Lynch called Scalia "one of the most influential and eloquent justices to ever serve on the U.S. Supreme Court".

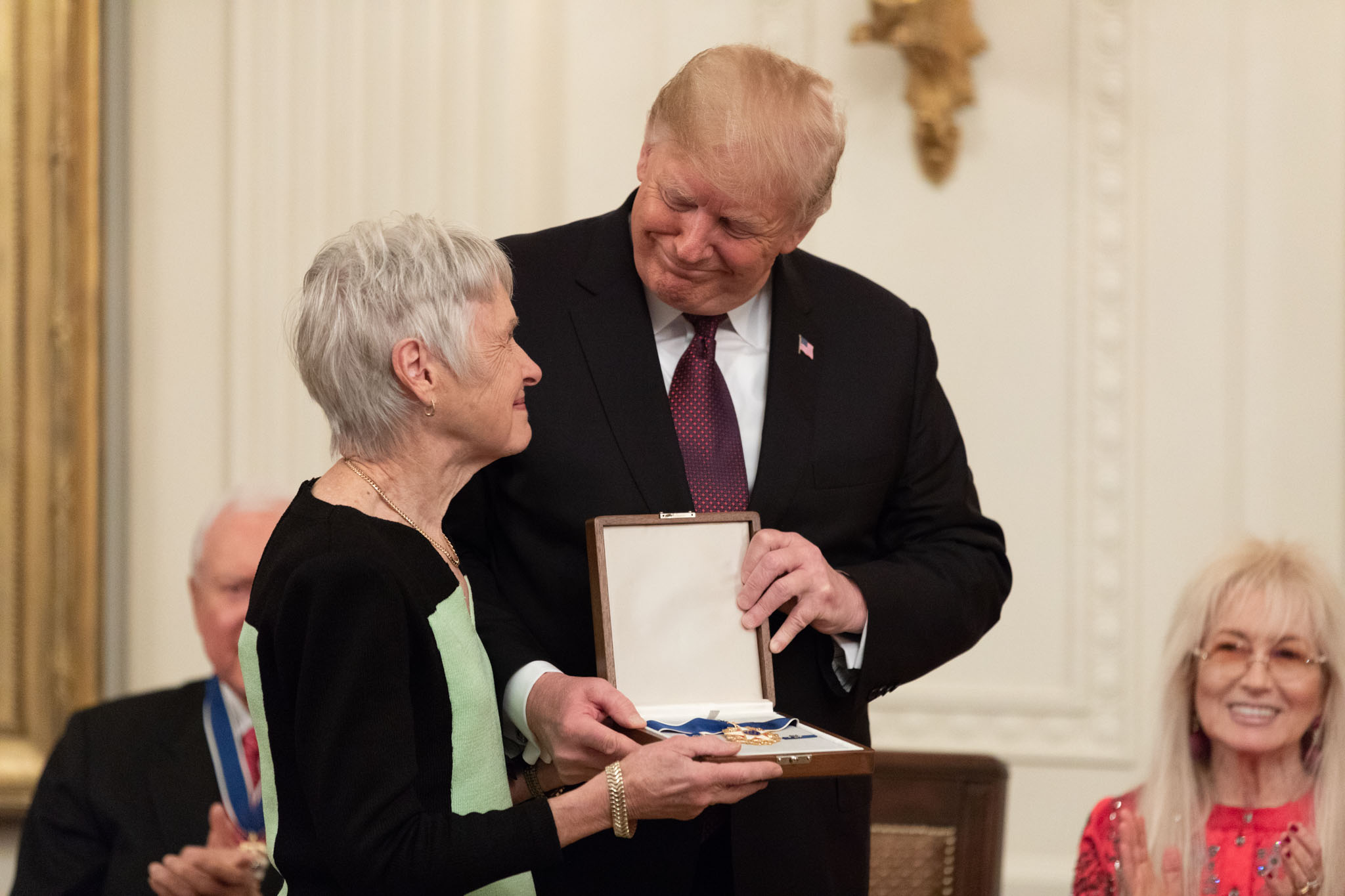
President Trump presents Scalia's Medal of Freedom posthumously to his widow, Maureen.

In May 2016, George Mason University renamed its law school the "Antonin Scalia Law School" after an anonymous donor pledged $20 million to the school, with an additional $10 million donated by the Charles Koch Foundation, contingent upon the name change in Scalia's honor. The dedication ceremony occurred on October 6, 2016, and was attended by Supreme Court justices. At the ceremony, Justice Elena Kagan called Scalia "one of the most important Supreme Court justices ever, and also one of the greatest".

In October 2016, the Italy–USA Foundation posthumously awarded Scalia its America Award. The ceremony was conducted in front of the Italian parliament in Rome.

In 2018, President Donald Trump posthumously awarded the Presidential Medal of Freedom to Scalia.

Writing for the plurality in Borden v. United States, Justice Kagan referenced Scalia, writing "Indeed, the Court has made a similar point before, in an opinion by one of its great wordsmiths."

In a concurring opinion in Loper Bright Enterprises v. Raimondo, Justice Neil Gorsuch praised Scalia for his willingness to reconsider his earlier views, writing that "rather than cling to the pride of personal precedent, the Justice began to express doubts over the very project that he had worked to build... If Chevron's ascent is a testament to the Justice's ingenuity, its demise is an even greater tribute to his humility"

== Succession ==
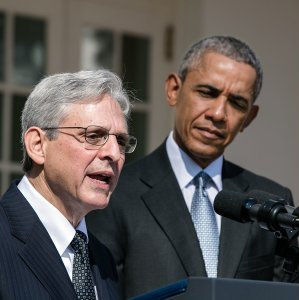
Merrick Garland with Barack Obama following the announcement that he is Obama's nominee to succeed Scalia (March 16, 2016)

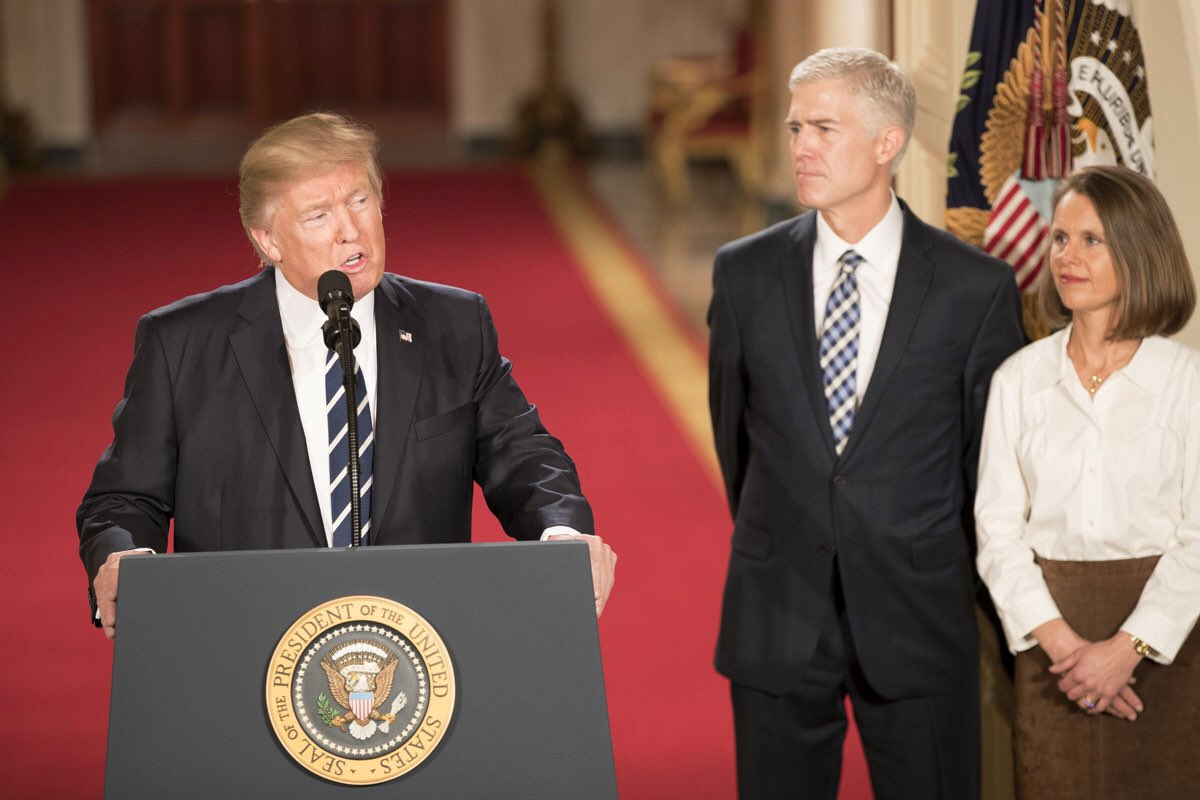
President Donald Trump announcing Tenth Circuit judge Neil Gorsuch as his nominee to succeed Scalia

Scalia's death—only the second death of a serving justice in the previous 60 years—left eight justices remaining on the Supreme Court, split 4–4 between fairly conservative and fairly liberal, during a presidential election year. Cases that were pending before the Court at Scalia's death were decided by the remaining eight members. A 4–4 deadlock would result in the ruling of the lower court being upheld, but no precedent being set, and the justices would not publish written opinions on the merits of the case.

In a 2012 interview, Scalia had said he would prefer Judge Frank Easterbrook of the U.S. Court of Appeals for the Seventh Circuit as his successor. On March 16, 2016, President Barack Obama, a Democrat, nominated Merrick Garland, Chief Judge of the United States Court of Appeals for the District of Columbia Circuit, to fill Scalia's seat, but the Republican-controlled Senate declined to take any action on the nomination; the nomination expired with the end of the 114th Congress on January 3, 2017. On January 31, 2017, Republican President Donald Trump announced the nomination of Judge Neil Gorsuch of the Tenth Circuit Court of Appeals to succeed Scalia. Gorsuch was confirmed by the Senate on April 7, 2017.

== Selected works ==
=== Books ===
- Scalia, Antonin (1997), Gutmann, Amy (ed.), A Matter of Interpretation: Federal Courts and the Law, Princeton N.J.: Princeton University Press, ISBN 0-691-00400-5
- —; Garner, Bryan A. (2008), Making Your Case: The Art of Persuading Judges, St. Paul: Thomson West, ISBN 978-0-314-18471-9
- —; Garner, Bryan A. (2012), Reading Law: The Interpretation of Legal Texts, St. Paul: Thomson West, ISBN 978-0-314-27555-4
- —; Scalia, Christopher J.; Whelan, Edward (2017). Scalia Speaks: Reflections on Law, Faith, and Life Well Lived. Crown Publishing Group. ISBN 9780525573326.

=== Articles ===
- Scalia, Antonin (1978). "Vermont Yankee: The APA, the D.C. Circuit, and the Supreme Court". Supreme Court Review. 1978: 345–410. JSTOR 3109536.
- — (1983). "The Doctrine of Standing As an Essential Element of the Separation of Powers" (PDF). Suffolk University Law Review. 17: 881–99.
- — (1988). "Originalism: The Lesser Evil". University of Cincinnati Law Review. 57: 849–65.
- — (1989). "Judicial Deference to Administrative Interpretations of Law". Duke Law Journal. 38 (1): 511–21. JSTOR 1372576.
- — (1989). "The Rule of Law As a Law of Rules". University of Chicago Law Review. 56 (4): 1175–88.

== See also ==
- List of federal judges appointed by Ronald Reagan
- List of United States Supreme Court justices by time in office
- The Originalist by John Strand
- Nine Black Robes by Joan Biskupic
- Scalia/Ginsburg

== Footnotes ==
Legal offices
Preceded by Roger C. Cramton	Chairman of the Administrative Conference of the United States; 1972–1974	Succeeded by Robert Anthony
Preceded by Roger C. Cramton	United States Assistant Attorney General for the Office of Legal Counsel; 1974–1977	Succeeded by John Harmon
Preceded by Roger Robb	Judge of the United States Court of Appeals for the District of Columbia Circuit; 1982–1986	Succeeded by David Sentelle
Preceded by William Rehnquist	Associate Justice of the Supreme Court of the United States; 1986–2016	Succeeded by Neil Gorsuch
