= Roger C. Cramton =

American law professor and scholar

11th Dean of Cornell Law School
- In office 1973–1980
- Preceded by: William Ray Forrester
- Succeeded by: Peter W. Martin

United States Assistant Attorney General for the Office of Legal Counsel
- In office 1972–1973
- President: Richard Nixon
- Preceded by: Ralph E. Erickson
- Succeeded by: Antonin Scalia

2nd Chair of the Administrative Conference of the United States
- In office 1970–1972
- President: Richard Nixon
- Preceded by: Jerre S. Williams
- Succeeded by: Antonin Scalia

Personal details
- Born: Roger Conant Cramton; May 18, 1929 Pittsfield, Massachusetts, U.S.
- Died: February 3, 2017 (aged 87) Ithaca, New York, U.S.
- Spouse: Harriet Hasselstine (m. 1952)
- Education: Harvard University (AB); University of Chicago (LLB)

Roger Conant Cramton (May 18, 1929 – February 3, 2017) was appointed by President Richard M. Nixon to be chairman of the Administrative Conference of the United States in 1970, and in 1972 became the assistant attorney general in charge of the Office of Legal Counsel in the Department of Justice. He was known for voicing opposition to Nixon during the Watergate scandal.

In 1973, Cramton became the Dean of Cornell Law School in 1973. He was also appointed by President Gerald Ford to be the first chairman of the Legal Services Corporation, a post that Hillary Clinton filled immediately after Cramton's tenure there.

== Education and career ==
Cramton graduated from Harvard University with an A.B., magna cum laude, in 1950. He earned his J.D. degree from the University of Chicago Law School in 1955. He served a law clerk to associate justice Harold Hitz Burton of the Supreme Court of the United States from 1956 to 1957.

== Personal life ==
He was married to Harriet until his death in 2017. He had four children, Ann Kopinski, Charles Cramton, Peter Cramton, and Cutter Cramton. He also had two sisters, 11 grandchildren and 21 great-grandchildren.

== See also ==
- List of law clerks for the eighth seat of the Supreme Court of the United States
