= Journal of Civil Law Studies =

- Discipline: Law
- Language: English

Publication details
- History: 2008-present
- Publisher: Louisiana State University Press

Standard abbreviations
- ISO 4: J. Civ. Law Stud.

Indexing
- ISSN: 1944-3749

Links
- Journal homepage

The Journal of Civil Law Studies (or JCLS) is a peer-reviewed, online and open-access academic journal covering civil law issues. Published by the Center of Civil Law Studies of Louisiana State University, where law students participate in the editorial process once papers have been accepted for publication. It promotes a comparative, and interdisciplinary approach to the civil law in Louisiana and abroad.
