= Eric Segall =

American legal scholar

Eric J. Segall is an American legal scholar and the Ashe Family Chair Professor of Law at Georgia State University College of Law, where he has taught since 1991. He teaches classes on federal courts and constitutional law.

== Biography ==
Segall graduated summa cum laude from Emory University and was elected to Phi Beta Kappa. He then received his Juris Doctor degree from Vanderbilt University Law School, where he was the research editor of the Vanderbilt Law Review and a member of the Order of the Coif. He subsequently clerked for Charles Allen Moye Jr., then the chief judge of the United States District Court for the Northern District of Georgia, and for Albert J. Henderson on the United States Court of Appeals for the Eleventh Circuit. He then worked for the United States Department of Justice in their civil division from 1987 to 1991, during which time he became interested in constitutional law. He joined the Georgia State University faculty in 1991 as a full professor.
