= Baltimore Gas & Electric Co. v. Natural Resources Defense Council, Inc. =

Baltimore Gas and Elec. Co. v. Natural Resources Defense Council, Inc.
- Supreme Court of the United States

Argued March 1, 1983 Decided June 6, 1983
- Full case name: Baltimore Gas & Elec. Co., Et Al. v. Natural Resources Defense Council, Inc.
- Citations: 462 U.S. 87 (more) 103 S. Ct. 2246; 76 L. Ed. 2d 437; 1983 U.S. LEXIS 48

Case history
- Prior: Natural Resources Defence Council, Inc. v. Nuclear Regulatory Commission, 685 F.2d 459 (D.C. Cir. 1982); cert. granted, 459 U.S. 1034 (1982).

Holding
- The NRC complied with NEPA, and its decision is not arbitrary or capricious within the meaning of § 10(e) of the Administrative Procedure Act.

Court membership
- Chief Justice Warren E. Burger Associate Justices William J. Brennan Jr. · Byron White; Thurgood Marshall · Harry Blackmun; Lewis F. Powell Jr. · William Rehnquist; John P. Stevens · Sandra Day O'Connor

Case opinion
- Majority: O'Connor, joined by Burger, Brennan, White, Marshall, Blackmun, Rehnquist, Stevens
- Powell took no part in the consideration or decision of the case.

Laws applied
- National Environmental Policy Act, Administrative Procedure Act

Baltimore Gas & Electric Co. v. Natural Resources Defense Council, Inc., 462 U.S. 87 (1983), is a United States Supreme Court decision that held valid a Nuclear Regulatory Commission (NRC) rule that during the licensing of nuclear power plants, the permanent storage of nuclear waste should be assumed to have no environmental impact.

== Background ==
42 U.S.C. § 4332(c) of the National Environmental Policy Act (NEPA) requires government agencies to consider the environmental impact of any major federal action. For the licensing of nuclear power plants by the NRC, the environmental impact includes activities necessary to produce new nuclear fuel and to dispose of spent nuclear fuel. In 1974, the NRC adopted a rule to determine the environmental impact of the fuel cycle in plant licensing proceedings.

For the long-term storage of transuranic and high-level radioactive waste, the rule in Table S-3 assumed that there would be no environmental impact because of a "zero release" assumption. That assumption was based upon an expectation that technology would be developed to isolate the wastes from the environment.

The Natural Resources Defense Council (NRDC) filed an action to challenge the Table S-3 rule, leading to the Supreme Court case Vermont Yankee Nuclear Power Corp. v. Natural Resources Defense Council, Inc., 435 U.S. 519 (1978). Then, the Supreme Court reversed the ruling by the Court of Appeals for the District of Columbia Circuit that the NRC rulemaking procedures to develop the rule were inadequate. It stated that the NRC had done everything that was required by NEPA and the Administrative Procedures Act and that courts lack the authority to impose rulemaking procedures greater than those contemplated by these statutes. The case was remanded for the circuit court to determine whether the Table S-3 rule was adequately supported by the administrative record.

While the Vermont Yankee case was before the Supreme Court, the NRC proposed a new Table S-3 rule, which maintained the "zero release" assumption for the long-term storage of spent fuel. The NRC also rejected a petition filed by the NRDC that had requested for Table S-3 to include uncertainties or for the nuclear plant licensing proceedings to be allowed to consider uncertainties in emissions from spent fuel storage.

The NRDC and New York State petitioned for judicial review of the Table S-3 rule in circuit court. The circuit court ruled that "Table S-3 rules were arbitrary and capricious and inconsistent with NEPA because the Commission had not factored the consideration of uncertainties surrounding the zero-release assumption into the licensing process in such a manner that the uncertainties could potentially effect the outcome of any decision to license a particular plant."

The Supreme Court, on appeal, granted certiorari.

== Decision ==
The Supreme Court reversed the decision of the circuit court and ruled that the NRC had complied with the requirements of NEPA. It explained that the NEPA requires that an agency must consider every significant aspect of the environmental impact of a proposed action and for the public to be informed of that. The role of a court is to ensure that the agency adequately considered and disclosed the environmental impact of its decision and that the agency's decision was not arbitrary and capricious.

Regarding the Table S-3 rule, it was the result of a lengthy proceeding in which the NRC determined that it was appropriate to evaluate the general environmental effects of the storage of nuclear wastes and not to evaluate the effects during nuclear power plant licensing proceedings.

It devices that the NRC's choice to use that generic method in the Table S-3 regulation was valid and that courts do not have the authority to require a different rule under the APA.

== See also ==
- Environmental impact assessment
- Environmental impact of nuclear power
- List of United States Supreme Court cases, volume 462
