= Regulatory agenda =

The federal government maintains a “regulatory agenda” of all regulations under development by executive branch agencies. The requirement to list rules likely to have a significant economic impact on a substantial number of small entities arises under statute, and the requirement to list all other rules arises under Executive Order 12866 § 4(b). The full regulatory agenda (broken out by cabinet department and independent agency) is printed twice a year in the Federal Register. Each agency's regulatory agenda lists:

- a brief description of the subject area of any rule which the agency expects to propose or promulgate.
- a summary of the nature of any such rule under consideration for each subject area listed in the agenda, the objectives and legal basis for the issuance of the rule, and an approximate schedule for completing action on any rule for which the agency has issued a general notice of proposed rulemaking
- the name and telephone number of a knowledgeable agency official.

The requirement for each agency to transmit its regulatory agenda to the Small Business Administration, Chief Counsel for Advocacy, arises under the Regulatory Flexibility Act, specifically 5 U.S.C. § 602. Each cabinet department accumulates the regulatory agenda of its component agencies. The Unified Agenda is compiled by the General Services Administration's Regulatory Information Service Center in cooperation with the Office of Information and Regulatory Affairs (OIRA) (OIRA is a component office of the Office of Management and Budget in the Executive Office of the President). The regulatory agenda is published in the Federal Register semi-annually. An edition of the Unified Agenda containing additional regulatory information that does not appear in the Federal Register version is available online through reginfo.gov.

Executive Orders 12866 and 13563 have significant implementing interpretive guidance. The Small Business Administration gives additional guidance in its publication How to Comply with the RFA.

Congress’ goal was to give the public some advance warning so that members of the public could influence agency decision-making on rulemaking. In practice, the regulatory agenda has not lived up to Congress’ aspirations.

- First, though by law the regulatory agenda is to be published in October and April of each year, agencies tend to be many months late. For example, the Securities and Exchange Commission's October 2023 regulatory agenda was published at 89 Fed. Reg. 9728 (Feb. 9, 2024). The Department of Commerce's October 2023 regulatory agenda was published at 89 Fed. Reg. 9548 (Feb. 9, 2024).
- Second, the same statute that requires agencies to publish a regulatory agenda provides that there is no penalty for an agency that either acts outside its published agenda listing, or publishes no agenda notice at all.

Some states or state agencies implement similar regulatory agendas, for example Arizona and Colorado Department of Revenue.
