= Plain language =

Clear, concise, comprehensible writing

Plain language is writing designed to ensure the reader understands as quickly, easily, and completely as possible. Plain language strives to be easy to read, understand, and use. It avoids verbose, convoluted language and jargon. In many countries, laws mandate that public agencies use plain language to increase access to programs and services. The United Nations Convention on the Rights of Persons with Disabilities includes plain language in its definition of communication.

== Definition ==
Most literacy and communications scholars agree that plain language means:

- "Communication your audience can understand the first time they read or hear it"
- "Clear and effective communication." (Joseph Kimble)
- "The idiomatic and grammatical use of language that most effectively presents ideas to the reader." (Bryan Garner)
- "Clear, straightforward expression, using only as many words as are necessary. It is language that avoids obscurity, inflated vocabulary and convoluted construction. It is not baby talk, nor is it a simplified version of ... language." (Dr Robert Eagleson)
- "A literary style that is easy-to-read because it matches the reading skill of the audience." (William DuBay)
- "Language that is clear, concise and correct." (Richard Wydick)
- "Language that allows readers to make an informed decision about the content because it considers their literacy levels, cognitive abilities, contexts, wants, needs, attitudes and challenges." (Candice Burt)

Plain language focuses on ways of writing so that text is clear, concise, pertinent, and efficient and flows well for the reader. The Center for Plain Language states that: "[a] document, web site or other information is in plain language if the target audience can read it, understand what they read, and confidently act on it". Writing in plain language does not mean oversimplifying the concepts, but presenting the information in a way that makes it easier to understand and use by a wider audience. Texts written in plain language are still formal, but are easier to read and inspire confidence for the reader.

Using plain language in communications ultimately improves efficiency, because there is less ambiguity for the readers, and less time is taken for clarifications and explanations. Clear communication improves the user's experience with the organization, ultimately creating trust in the company.

== Guidelines and tips ==
Writers who wish to write in plain language must first and foremost consider their target audience. This should influence what information is included in the text and how it is written. Different audiences have different needs, and require different information. When writing, it is important to consider what the target audience needs to accomplish, and what and how much information they need to complete it. The needs of the target audience will also affect the chosen vocabulary: writing for someone in the same field as the author is different from writing for someone whose native language is not English.

Provide informative headings, topic sentences, and frequent summaries to help orient the reader. For complex documents, create a comprehensive table of contents.

Organize the text logically: the most important information should be mentioned first, in the text as a whole and in every individual paragraph. Headings help the reader skim the text more rapidly to find what they're looking for. Sentences should be kept short, and only include necessary information. A long, verbose sentence tends to present too much information at once, and blurs its main point. The text should be direct and concise, and have an easy flow to it.

The chosen vocabulary must remain simple and familiar. Everyday language should be favoured against acronyms, jargon and legal language. Plain language favours the use of the verb form of the word, instead of the noun form. To increase clarity, use the active voice, in which the subject does the action of the verb. Sentences written in plain language have a positive construction and address the reader directly.

Writing in plain language also takes into account the presentation of the text. It is important to choose a font that is easy to read, and set it to an adequate size. Sentences written in capital letters are harder to read because the letters are less distinguishable from one another. Simple design elements like leaving white spaces, using bullets, and choosing contrasting colours encourages a user to read the text and increases readability.

== Purposes ==
=== Reading comprehension ===
Proponents of plain language adoption argue that it improves reading comprehension and readability and grants readers greater access to information. Simple language allows documents to be read and understood by a larger audience, as plain language adoption often involves rewriting very technical and field-specific documents, like legal and medical documents.

=== Accessibility ===
Some scholars promote plain language use as a means of making documents accessible, especially for disabled readers or those who lack the expertise and education to understand overly technical documents. Simpler language can decrease a reader's cognitive load and improve information retention in readers who normally struggle to read complex documents. Changes in font, text size, and colour can make texts more readable for individuals with impaired vision. Some scholars view plain language from a social justice perspective as a means of increasing equal access to information, especially for marginalized populations that might have decreased access to education.

=== Ethical action ===
While plain language has practical benefits, many practitioners also consider its use to be part of ethical action, alongside being responsive, respectful, truthful, and fair. The US-based Center for Plain Language even declares that "Plain language is a civil right". On the other hand, plain language can be used for unethical ends, such as to obscure or withhold truths. Willerton proposes the BUROC framework for identifying situations requiring the ethical action of plain language: bureaucratic, unfamiliar, rights-oriented, critical.

=== Legal action ===
The United States' Federal Rules of Civil Procedure require a claim for relief to include "a short and plain statement of the grounds for the court’s jurisdiction", and "a short and plain statement of the claim". A party claiming a defense to a claim must state its defense "in short and plain terms".

== Examples ==
Original text	Plain language
High-quality learning environments are a necessary precondition for facilitation and enhancement of the ongoing learning process.	Children need good schools so they can learn well.
Firearm relinquishment is a mandatory condition.	You must hand over your guns.
This temporary injunction remains in effect against both parties until the final decree of divorce or order of legal separation is entered, the complaint is dismissed, the parties reach agreement, or until the court modifies or dissolves this injunction. This injunction shall not preclude either party from applying to the court for further temporary orders, an extended injunction or modification or revocation of this temporary injunction.	You must follow this order until the court changes or ends it, your case is finalized or dismissed, or you and your spouse make an agreement. Either spouse may ask the court to change or cancel this order or to issue new orders.

== History ==
=== Early history ===
Cicero argued, "When you wish to instruct, be brief; that men's minds take in quickly what you say, learn its lesson, and retain it faithfully. Every word that is unnecessary only pours over the side of a brimming mind."

Shakespeare parodied the pretentious style, as in the speeches of Dogberry in Much Ado About Nothing. The plain, or native style, was, in fact, an entire literary tradition during the English Renaissance, from John Skelton through Ben Jonson and include such poets as Barnabe Googe, George Gascoigne, Walter Raleigh, and perhaps the later work of Fulke Greville. In addition to its purely linguistic plainness, the Plain Style employed an emphatic, pre-Petrarchan prosody (each syllable either clearly stressed or clearly unstressed).

=== 19th century ===
By the end of the 19th century, scholars began to study the features of plain language. A. L. Sherman, a professor of English literature at the University of Nebraska, wrote Analytics of Literature: A Manual for the Objective Study of English Prose and Poetry in 1893. In this work, Sherman showed that the typical English sentence has shortened over time and that spoken English is a pattern for written English.

Sherman wrote:

Literary English, in short, will follow the forms of the standard spoken English from which it comes. No man should talk worse than he writes, no man writes better than he should talk.... The oral sentence is clearest because it is the product of millions of daily efforts to be clear and strong. It represents the work of the race for thousands of years in perfecting an effective instrument of communication.

=== 1900 to 1950 ===
Two 1921 works, Harry Kitson's "The Mind of the Buyer", and Edward L. Thorndike's "The Teacher's Word Book" picked up where Sherman left off. Kitson's work was the first to apply empirical psychology to advertising. He advised the use of short words and sentences. Thorndike's work contained the frequency ratings of 10,000 words. He recommended using the ratings in his book to grade books not only for students in schools but also for average readers and adults learning English. Thorndike wrote:

It is commonly assumed that children and adults prefer trashy stories in large measure because they are more exciting and more stimulating in respect to sex. There is, however, reason to believe that greater ease of reading in respect to vocabulary, construction, and facts, is a very important cause of preference. A count of the vocabulary of "best sellers" and a summary of it in terms of our list would thus be very instructive.

The 1930s saw many studies on how to make texts more readable. In 1931, Douglas Tyler and Ralph Waples published the results of their two-year study, "What People Want to Read About". In 1934, Ralph Ojemann, Edgar Dale, and Ralph Waples published two studies on writing for adults with limited reading ability. In 1935, educational psychologist William S. Gray teamed up with Bernice Leary to publish their study, "What Makes a Book Readable".

George Orwell's 1946 essay "Politics and the English Language" decried the pretentious diction, meaninglessness, vagueness, and worn-out idioms of political jargon. In 1979, the Plain English Campaign was founded in London to combat "gobbledegook, jargon and legalese".

=== 1951 to 2000 ===
Lyman Bryson at Teachers College in Columbia University led efforts to supply average readers with more books of substance dealing with science and current events. Bryson's students include Irving Lorge and Rudolf Flesch, who became leaders in the plain-language movement. In 1975, Flesch collaborated with J. Peter Kincaid to create the Flesch-Kincaid readability test, which uses an algorithm to produce grade level scores that predict the level of education required to read the selected text. The instrument looks at word length (number of letters) and sentence length (number of words) and produces a score that is tied to a U.S. grade school level. For example, a score of 8.0 means that an eighth grader can read the document.

Others who later led plain language and readability research include educator Edgar Dale of Ohio State University, Jeanne S. Chall of the Reading Laboratory of Harvard, and George R. Klare of Ohio University. Their efforts spurred the publication of over 200 readability formulas and 1,000 published studies on readability.

Beginning in 1935, a series of literacy surveys showed that the average reader in the U.S. was an adult of limited reading ability. Today, the average adult in the United States reads at the ninth-grade level.

Access to health information, educational and economic development opportunities, and government programs is often referred to in a social justice context. To ensure more community members can access this information, many adult educators, legal writers, and social program developers use plain language principles when they develop public documents. The goal of plain language translation is to increase accessibility for those with lower literacy levels.

In the United States, the movement towards plain language legal writing began with the 1963 book Language of the Law, by David Mellinkoff. However, the movement was popularized by Richard Wydick's 1979 book Plain English for Lawyers. This was followed by famous plain language promissory notes by Nationwide Mutual Insurance and Citibank in the 1970s.

Concerned about the large number of suits against its customers to collect bad debts, the bank voluntarily made the decision to implement plain language policies in 1973. That same decade, the consumer-rights movement won legislation that required plain language in contracts, insurance policies, and government regulations. American law schools began requiring students to take legal writing classes that encouraged them to use plain English as much as possible and to avoid legal jargon, except when absolutely necessary. Public outrage with the skyrocketing number of unreadable government forms led to the Paperwork Reduction Act of 1980.

In 1972, the Plain Language Movement received practical political application, when President Richard Nixon decreed that the "Federal Register be written in layman's terms". On March 23, 1978, President Jimmy Carter signed Executive Order 12044, which said that federal officials must see that each regulation is "written in plain English and understandable to those who must comply with it". President Ronald Reagan rescinded these orders in 1981, but many political agencies continued to follow them. By 1991, eight states had also passed legislation related to plain language. Plain Language Association International (PLAIN) was formed in 1993 as the Plain Language Network. Its membership is international; it was incorporated as a non-profit organization in Canada in 2008. In June 1998, President Bill Clinton issued a memorandum that called for executive departments and agencies to use plain language in all government documents. Vice President Al Gore subsequently led a plain language initiative that formed a group called the Plain Language Action Network (PLAIN) to provide plain language training to government agencies.

=== 21st century ===
PLAIN provided guidance to federal executive agencies when President Barack Obama signed the Plain Writing Act of 2010, which required federal executive agencies to put all new and revised covered documents into plain language. The Act's sponsor, U.S. Representative Bruce Braley, noted upon its passage that "The writing of documents in the standard vernacular English language will bolster and increase the accountability of government within America and will continue to more effectively save time and money in this country."

Plain language is also gaining traction in U.S. courts and legal aid agencies. California was the first state to adopt plain language court forms and instructions, for which it received the 2003 Burton Award for Outstanding Reform. A 2006 comparative study of plain language court forms concluded that "plain language court forms and instructions are better understood, easier to use, and more economical".

The European Union provides standards for making information easy to read and understand. The rules are comparable to the rules for plain language. Based in Germany is a dictionary for plain language called Hurraki. In France, a 2002 decision by the Constitutional Council recognized a constitutional goal of ensuring the "clarity and intelligibility" of French law. In 2013 the Israeli Knesset passed service accessibility regulations which mandated the use of simple language and/or language simplification (Hebrew = פישוט לשוני), which were subsequently codified in 2015 for implementation.

ISO has formed a Working Group within Technical Committee ISO/TC 37 to develop plain language standards and guidelines. Their work began officially towards the end of 2019. It has published standard ISO 24495-1 in 2023.

== See also ==
- Easy read
- Laconic phrase
- Legal writing
- Linguistic purism in English
- List of Germanic and Latinate equivalents in English
- Plain English
- Readability
- Scribes: The American Society of Legal Writers
- Succinctness

=== Opposites of plain language ===
- Aureation
- Corporate jargon
- Gobbledygook
- Legalese
- Psychobabble
- Technobabble
- Verbosity
