= Rulemaking =

Process by which executive branch agencies create regulations

In administrative law in the United States, rulemaking is the process that executive and independent agencies use to create, or promulgate, regulations. In general, legislatures first set broad policy mandates by passing statutes, then agencies create more detailed regulations through rulemaking.

By bringing detailed scientific and other types of expertise to bear on policy, the rulemaking process has been the means by which some of the most far-reaching government regulations of the 20th century have been created. For example, science-based regulations are critical to modern programs for environmental protection, food safety, and workplace safety. However, the growth in regulations has fueled criticism that the rulemaking process reduces the transparency and accountability of democratic government.

== Introduction ==
Legislatures rely on rulemaking to add more detailed scientific, economic, or industry expertise to a policy—fleshing out the broader mandates of authorizing legislation. For example, typically a legislature would pass a law mandating the establishment of safe drinking water standards, and then assign an agency to develop the list of contaminants and safe levels through rulemaking.

The rise of the rulemaking process itself is a matter of political controversy. Many find that obscure and complex rulemaking tends to undercut the democratic ideal of a government that is closely watched by and accountable to its citizens.

== Purposes ==
Although executive agencies are usually charged with executing, not promulgating a regulatory scheme, the breadth and depth of regulation today renders it difficult, if not impossible, for legislatures to specify the details of modern regulatory schemes. As a result, the specification of these details are mostly delegated to agencies for rulemaking.

Common purposes of rulemaking include:

- Adding scientific expertise. For example, in the U.S., the Federal Food, Drug, and Cosmetic Act outlaws the sale of adulterated or impure drugs. The act requires that the Department of Health and Human Services promulgate regulations establishing which laboratory tests to use to test the purity of each drug.
- Adding implementation detail. Legislation on automobile fuel efficiency, for example, often delegates the development of the actual engine tests used to calculate 'city mileage' and 'highway mileage'.
- Adding industry expertise. The U.S. Clean Air Act and Clean Water Act require the United States Environmental Protection Agency to determine the appropriate emissions control technologies on an industry-by-industry basis.
- Adding flexibility. More detailed regulations allow for more nuanced approaches to various conditions than a single legislative standard could. Moreover, regulations tend to be more easily changed as new data or technologies emerge.
- Finding compromise. In some cases, a divided legislature can reach an agreement on a compromise legislative standard, while each side holds out hope that the implementing regulations will be more favorable to its cause.

== Process ==
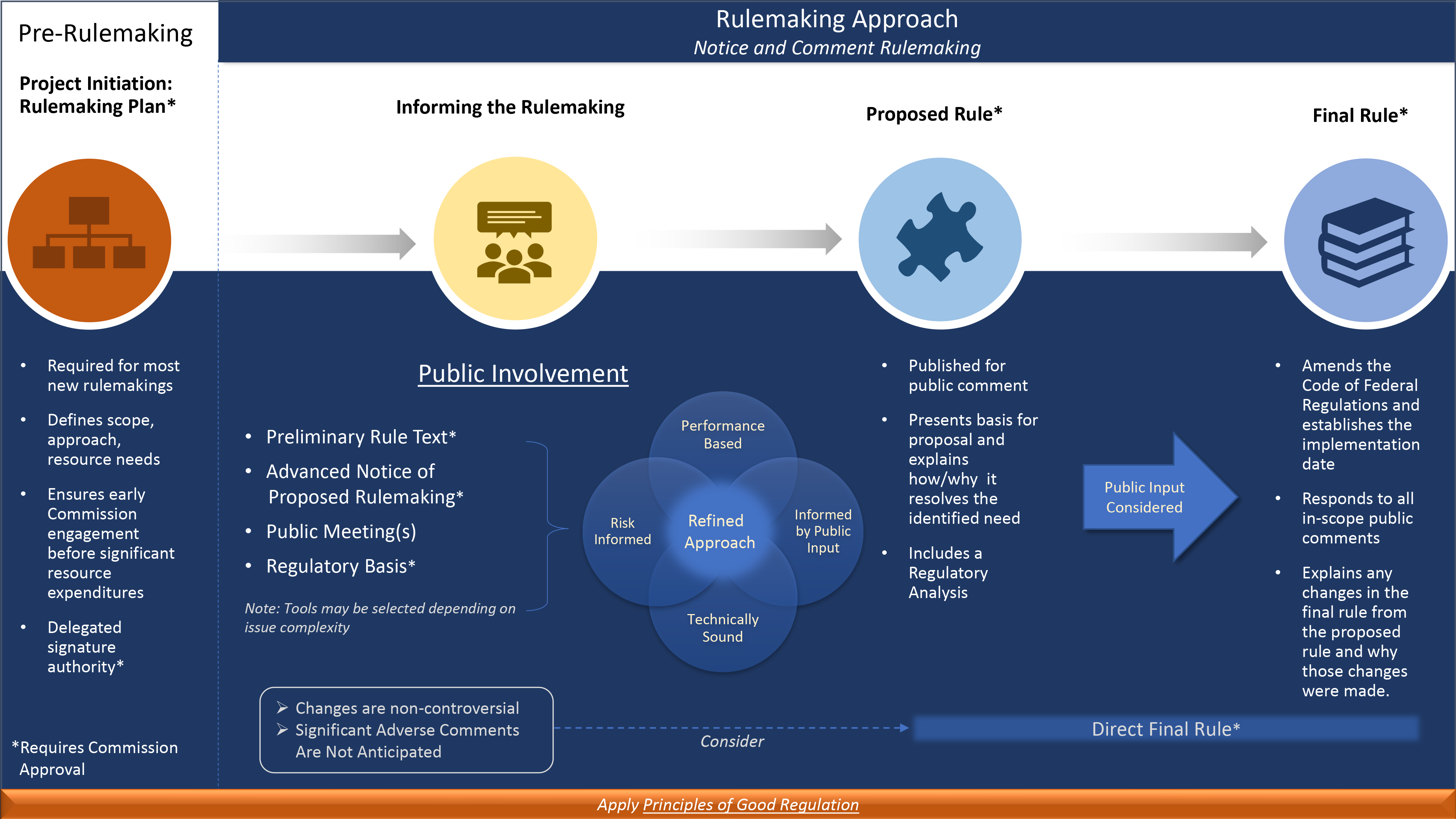
A partial diagram of the rulemaking process as described by the US Nuclear Regulatory Commission in 2021

Rulemaking processes are generally designed to ensure that

- The public is informed of proposed rules before they take effect;
- The public can comment on the proposed rules and provide additional data to the agency;
- The public can access the rulemaking record and analyze the data and analysis behind a proposed rule;
- The agency analyzes and responds to the public's comments;
- The agency creates a permanent record of its analysis and the process;
- The agency's actions can be reviewed by a judge or others to ensure the correct process was followed.

The primary administrative law statutes and other laws that govern agency rule making include:

- The Administrative Procedure Act, 5 U.S.C. §§ 552 and 553
- The Housekeeping Act, 5 U.S.C. § 301, which gives heads of agencies authority to issue rules for agency employees
- The Regulatory Flexibility Act, 5 U.S.C. §§ 601 et seq., which requires agencies to consider the needs of small entities in rule making
- The Paperwork Reduction Act, 44 U.S.C. §§ 3501 et seq., which limits the power of an agency to collect information from the public
- The Congressional Review Act, 5 U.S.C. §§ 801–808, which gives Congress the authority to review and veto any agency regulation
- The Independent Offices Appropriations Act of 1952, 31 U.S.C. §§ 9701, which limits the power of agencies to set user fees
- Executive Order 12866, which requires agencies to use cost-benefit balancing in all regulatory actions

For example, a typical U.S. federal rulemaking would contain these steps:

- Legislation. The U.S. Congress passes a law, containing an organic statute that creates a new administrative agency, and that outlines general goals the agency is to pursue through its rulemaking. Similarly, Congress may prescribe such goals and rulemaking duties to a pre-existing agency.
- When the agency begins to develop a rule, the agency must file with OMB to put the rule on the "regulatory agenda".
- In the process of developing a rule, before publication in a Notice of Proposed Rulemaking, the agency must “consult with members of the public” to evaluate the following:

(i) whether the proposed collection of information is necessary for the proper performance of the functions of the agency;
(ii) the accuracy of the agency's estimate of the burden;
(iii) how to enhance the quality, utility, and clarity of the information to be collected; and
(iv) minimize the burden of the collection of information on those who are to respond.

- Advance Notice of Proposed Rulemaking. This optional step entails publishing the agency's initial analysis of the subject matter, often asking for early public input on key issues. Any data or communications regarding the upcoming rule would be made available to the public for review. Occasionally, a board of potentially affected parties is comprised to do give-and-take bargaining over rulemaking subject-matter which would otherwise result in deadlocked opposition by an interested party. This is commonly called "negotiated rulemaking", and results in more custom-tailored proposed rule. An ANPRM can be a useful opportunity for the agency to collect some of the information and feedback it needs for later steps.
- If the rule is “economically significant” under Executive Order 12,866, then the agency must prepare a Regulatory Impact Analysis under OMB Circular A-4 before the agency publishes a Notice of Proposed Rulemaking.
- Any rule that imposes or modifies any “information collection” burden on the public must be submitted to the Director of OMB, with “objectively supported” estimates, no later than the time of a Notice of Proposed Rulemaking. As part of this submission, the agency must certify or demonstrate (depending on the setting), and provide a record in support of the certification, that:

(a) the information to be collected “is necessary for the proper performance of the functions of the agency”; (b) the agency is not seeking “unnecessarily duplicative” collection of “information otherwise reasonably accessible to the agency”; (c) the agency “has taken every reasonable step to ensure that the proposed collection of information … is the least burdensome necessary”; and (d) the regulations are “written using plain, coherent, and unambiguous terminology.”

- Proposed Rule. In this step, the agency publishes the actual proposed regulatory language in the Federal Register; in which a discussion of the justification and analysis behind the rule is printed, as well as the agency's response to any public comment on the advance notice.
- Public comment. Once a proposed rule is published in the Federal Register, a public comment period begins, allowing the public to submit written comments to the agency. Most agencies are required to respond to every issue raised in the comments. Depending on the complexity of the rule, comment periods may last for 30 to even 180 days.
- Final Rule. Usually, the proposed rule becomes the final rule with some minor modifications. In this step, the agency publishes a full response to issues raised by public comments and an updated analysis and justification for the rule, including an analysis of any new data submitted by the public. In some cases, the agency may publish a second draft proposed rule, especially if the new draft is so different from the proposed rule that it raises new issues that have not been submitted to public comment. This again appears in the Federal Register, and if no further steps are taken by the public or interested parties, it is codified into the Code of Federal Regulations.
- Judicial review. In some cases, members of the public or regulated parties file a lawsuit alleging that the rulemaking is improper. While courts generally offer significant deference to the agency's technical expertise, they do review closely whether the regulation exceeds the rulemaking authority granted by the authorizing legislation and whether the agency properly followed the process for public notice and comment.
- Effective date. Except in extraordinary circumstances, the rule does not become effective for some time after its initial publication to allow regulated parties to come into compliance. Some rules provide several years for compliance.
- "Hybrid" rulemaking. Not a legal term of art, but describes the kind of rulemaking performed by agencies that is somewhere between formal (with a hearing and record) and informal (with the notice and comment procedures described above). Hybrid rulemaking generally subsumes procedural aspects reserved for adjudication, such as a formal hearing in which interested parties are sworn and subject to cross-examination. The statutory construction of the Administrative Procedure Act, as well as the Supreme Court's ruling in Vermont Yankee Nuclear Power Corp. v. Natural Resources Defense Council, Inc., make hybrid-rulemaking proper only when specifically provided for by the U.S. Congress.

In the United States when an agency publishes a final rule generally the rule is effective no less than thirty days after the date of publication in the Federal Register. If the agency wants to make the rule effective sooner, it must cite "good cause" (persuasive reasons) as to why this is in the public interest.

Significant rules (defined by Executive Order 12866) and major rules (defined by the Small Business Regulatory Enforcement Fairness Act ) are required to have a 60-day delayed effective date.

== Rules ==
Most modern rulemaking authorities have a common law tradition or a specific basic law that essentially regulates the regulators, subjecting the rulemaking process to standards of due process, transparency, and public participation.

- In the United States, the governing law for federal rulemaking is the Administrative Procedure Act of 1946. Separate states often have parallel systems.
- Commonwealth countries use a mix of common law and similar statute law.
- The European Commission has recently developed new standards under ideas laid out in a 'Whitepaper on governance.' This effort was undertaken after the Irish ‘No’ vote in 2001, addressing concerns that the public perceived the commission's legislative and rulemaking processes as too removed from citizen input.

== Use in private industry ==
Private rulemaking bodies, such as the Internet Engineering Task Force, Java Community Process, and other technical communities, have adopted similar principles and frameworks to ensure fairness, transparency, and thoroughness. While the mechanics vary, these efforts follow the same pattern of an open rulemaking record, public publication of proposals, and an opportunity for public comment on those proposals before they are finalized.

== Apparatus ==
Public participation requires some official methods for the agency to communicate with the public. Generally, agencies produce an official gazette, or periodical for publishing all rulemaking notice, such as the Federal Register. Once a rule is final, the language of the rule itself (not the supporting analysis or data) is codified in the official body of regulations, such as the Code of Federal Regulations (CFR).

In essence, the accountability of the rulemaking system assumes that the public does take note of all of the notices in the Federal Register, which can run over a hundred pages per day. In practice, many industry or public advocacy lobbyists and lawyers monitor the Federal Register Table of Contents every day by email on behalf of their constituents or clients.

Public comments are the heart of the public's ability to participate in the rulemaking process. The agency rulemaking is usually required to consider and publish a written response to all comments. Although high-profile rulemakings may include public hearings, most rulemakings are simply noticed in the Federal Register with a call for written comments by a set deadline.

Holding agencies accountable for objective, fact-based rulemaking requires maintaining a formal record of the facts and analysis behind the rule. Agencies must assemble and make public a rulemaking record that includes all information considered as part of the rulemaking process.

These records can be enormous and can easily fill scores to hundreds of boxes. Interested parties generally must travel to an agency repository to inspect and copy this record. In the United States, the Federal government is moving toward posting rulemaking dockets online at www.regulations.gov. Supporting documentation for 37% of new rulemakings was available on-line as of August 2006. By August 2007 it was available for 80% of new rulemakings. Interested parties frequently comb through the agency's data to find flaws in the agency's reasoning. Also, interested parties’ comments on the rule then become part of this record.

== The courts ==
In the U.S., interested parties can sue to have a judge review the rulemaking process once the rule is finalized. Interested parties frequently sue the rulemaking agency, asking the court to order the agency to reconsider. For example, environmental groups may sue, claiming that the rule is too lax on industry; or industry groups may sue, claiming that the rule is too onerous.

Traditionally, courts are reluctant to step into the shoes of the technical experts and re-open the decisions made in the agency's detailed analysis. However, courts do review whether a rulemaking meets the standards for the rulemaking process. The basis of this review by the courts may be limited to certain questions of fairness or the procedures that ensure that both sides of a dispute are treated equally before any decision making occurs or that the decision is not patently unreasonable (under Canadian law) or Wednesbury unreasonableness (under British law) or similar doctrines described below.

These powers of review of administrative decisions, while often governed by statute, were originally developed out of the royal prerogative writs of English law such as the writ of mandamus and the writ of certiorari.

Thus, it is not enough to simply claim that the rulemaking agency could have done a better job. Instead, under U.S. administrative law, to ask the court to order changes in a rule, a party must argue that the rule is:

Arbitrary and capricious and/or unsupported by the record. Most frequently, objectors will argue that, even if the judge is not an expert, the judge can tell that there is an obvious gap in the agency's data or analysis. A court may intervene if it finds that there is no reasonable way that the agency could have drafted the rule, given the evidence in the rulemaking record. A court may send a rule back to the agency for further analysis, generally leaving the agency to decide whether to change the rule to match the existing record or to amend the record to show how they arrived at the original rule. If a court does remand a rule back to the agency, it almost always involves an additional notice and public comment period.

Exceeds statutory authority. Frequently, opponents of a rule argue that it fails to follow the instructions of the authorizing legislation. Rules can be found to exceed statutory authority if they are too strict or too lax. If a law instructs an agency to issue regulations to ban a chemical, but the agency issues a rule that instead sets levels for safe use—or vice versa—a court may order the agency to issue a new rule.

Bolt out of the blue. Occasionally, interested parties argue that the final rule contains provisions that were never vetted during the public comment period. A court may intervene if it finds that there was no way that the commenting public could have anticipated the new provisions and provided comments. If so, the new provisions are said to be, in a colorful legal phrase, a 'bolt out of the blue' rather than a reasonable course correction during the rulemaking process. Frequently, agencies will vet several options during the proposed rule phase to allow for comment on the full spectrum of rules under consideration.

== See also ==
- Primary and secondary legislation
- eRulemaking
- Legislative veto
