= Regulatory reform =

Regulatory reform concerns improvements to the quality of government regulation.

At the international level, the "OECD Regulatory Reform Programme is aimed at helping governments improve regulatory quality - that is, reforming regulations that raise unnecessary obstacles to competition, innovation and growth, while ensuring that regulations efficiently serve important social objectives".

== Examples ==
=== Indonesia ===
The OECD produced a report in September 2012 reviewing Indonesia's regulatory reform programme, focusing on Indonesia's administrative and institutional arrangements for ensuring that regulations are effective and efficient.

=== Luxembourg ===
Luxembourg's government established a committee, the Comité National pour la Simplification Administrative en faveur des Entreprises (CNSAE), to improve business regulation by the various government departments, aiming also to improve public perception of the government's administrative simplification programme. The European Commission has noted the committee's work on streamlining business consultation processes for the benefit of small and medium-sized enterprises.

=== United Kingdom ===
The Enterprise and Regulatory Reform Act 2013 aimed in part to "make provision for the reduction of legislative burdens". Part 5, "Reduction of legislative burdens", made provision for "sunset and review provisions" in secondary legislation, i.e.

- a power to review the effectiveness of the legislation within a specified period or at the end of a specified period
- provision for the legislation to cease to have effect at the end of a specified day or a specified period
- a power to consider whether the objectives which it was the purpose of the legislation to achieve remain appropriate and, if so, whether they could be achieved in another way.

The Regulatory Reform (Scotland) Act 2014 sought to improve the regulation of businesses requiring certain environmental permits within Scotland whilst strengthening existing environmental protection.

=== United States ===
- Executive Order 12866 on Regulatory Planning and Review, amended by Executive Order 13422 of January 18, 2007
- The Office of Regulatory Affairs was established in 1980
- Regulatory Flexibility Act of 1980
- H.R. 5 (bill), the Regulatory Accountability Act of 2017. Some policy advocates argue that this bill should "more aptly ... be named the 'Filthy Food Act'".

== See also ==
- Governmental accounting
- Government effectiveness index
