= Natural Resources Defense Council =

Non-profit environmental advocacy group

- Abbreviation: NRDC
- Established: 1970; 56 years ago
- Founders: John Adams; Richard Ayres; John Bryson; James Gustave Speth; Edward Strohbehn
- Type: 501(c)(3) organization
- Tax ID no.: 13-2654926
- Headquarters: New York City, US
- Region served: Worldwide
- Method: Advocacy, education, litigation
- Members: 2.4 million (2015)
- President and CEO: Manish Bapna
- Subsidiaries: NRDC Action Fund
- Budget: US$151.6 million (2015)
- Staff: 700 (2020)
- Website: nrdc.org

The Natural Resources Defense Council (NRDC) is a United States–based 501(c)(3) nonprofit international environmental advocacy group, with its headquarters in New York City and offices in Washington, D.C., San Francisco, Los Angeles, Chicago, Bozeman, India, and Beijing. The group was founded in 1970 in opposition to a hydroelectric power plant in New York.

As of 2019, the NRDC had over three million members, with online activities nationwide, and a staff of about 700 lawyers, scientists and other policy experts.

== History ==
NRDC was founded in 1970. Its establishment was partially an outgrowth of the Scenic Hudson Preservation Conference v. Federal Power Commission, the Storm King case. The case centered on Con Ed's plan to build the world's largest hydroelectric facility at Storm King Mountain in New York's Hudson Valley. The proposed facility would have pumped vast amounts of water from the Hudson River to a reservoir and released it through turbines to generate electricity at peak demand.

A dozen concerned citizens organized the Scenic Hudson Preservation Conference in opposition to the project, citing its environmental impact, and the group, represented by Whitney North Seymour Jr., his law partner Stephen Duggan, and David Sive, sued the Federal Power Commission and successfully achieved a ruling that groups such as Scenic Hudson and other environmentalist groups had the standing to challenge the FPC's administrative rulings. Realizing that continued environmentalist litigation would require a nationally organized, professionalized group of lawyers and scientists, Duggan, Seymour, and Sive obtained funding from the Ford Foundation and joined forces with Gus Speth and three other recent Yale Law School graduates of the class of 1969: Richard Ayres, Edward Strohbehn Jr., and John Bryson.

John H. Adams was the group's first staff member and Duggan its founding chairman; Seymour, Laurance Rockefeller, and others served as members of the board.

In September 1979 The Ford Foundation pulled funding for the NRDC alongside the Environmental Defense Fund after Henry Ford II said groups receiving foundation money were "antibusiness" and "biting the hand that feeds them." The NRDC had recently challenged the FDA's interim approval for Coca-Cola's first plastic bottle made of acrylonitrile/styrene. The FDA reported that test animals exposed to acrylonitrile had "significantly lowered body weight and other adverse effects, including lesions in the central nervous system and growths in the ear ducts." and suspended its approval.

=== Position on nuclear power ===
In the 1970s, NRDC sought to block expansion of the Indian Point nuclear power plant in New York. It had advocated for the closure of the plant until it ceased operations in 2021. NRDC has also sought to close the Diablo Canyon nuclear plant in California. In 2018, the NRDC took no position on legislative proposals in New Jersey to subsidize three of its nuclear reactors. NRDC has argued that nuclear power is not a viable energy source to mitigate climate change, arguing that it poses public health and safety risks through nuclear waste and nuclear proliferation. In 2014, NRDC president Frances Beinecke said that the NRDC could not support nuclear power because it would lose donations.

=== Position on solar power ===
According to NRDC, rooftop solar power plays an "essential role... in our shared mission to confront the climate crisis." However, its activism on rooftop solar has sparked controversy. In 2022, NRDC called for reductions in subsidies for rooftop solar power in California, prompting criticism of NRDC by other environmental groups.

In 2012, NRDC sued the federal government to stop the 663.5-megawatt Calico solar station in the Mojave Desert in California. NRDC said the solar plant would imperil protected wildlife.

=== Position on hydropower ===
NRDC's position on hydropower is that it is not a renewable energy source. When Indian Point was scheduled for closure, NRDC held no position on a proposal to build a transmission line to Quebec to access excess hydropower while arguing, "we certainly would not be on board where [hydropower] gobbles up the space we think should be covered by true renewables".

== Programs ==
NRDC states the purpose of its work is "safeguard the earth—its people, its plants and animals, and the natural systems on which all life depends," and to "ensure the rights of all people to the air, the water and the wild, and to prevent special interests from undermining public interests." Their stated areas of work include: "climate change, communities, energy, food, health, oceans, water, the wild".

As a legal advocacy group, the NRDC works to accomplish environmental goals by operating within the legal system to reduce pollution and protect natural resources through litigation, and by working with professionals in science, law, and policy at the national and international level. The NRDC's Center for Campaigns & Organizing (CC&O) also oversees the NRDC Action Fund, a separate 501(c)(4) nonprofit organization which engages in political and electoral activities.

NRDC published onEarth, a quarterly magazine that dealt with environmental challenges, through 2016. It was founded in 1979 as The Amicus Journal. As Amicus, it won the George Polk Award in 1983 for special interest reporting.

== Staff ==
The council's first president was John H. Adams, who served until 2006. He was replaced by Frances Beinecke, who served as president from 2006 to 2015. The third president was Rhea Suh, who served from 2015 to 2019.

In 2020, Gina McCarthy served as the CEO and president. She previously served as the head of the Environmental Protection Agency in the Obama administration and became White House National Climate Advisor in the Biden administration in 2021. In 2021, NRDC selected Manish Bapna, formerly of the World Resources Institute, as their new president and CEO. At their web site NRDC state they have about 700 employees including scientists, lawyers, and policy advocates.

== Legislation ==
NRDC v. U.S. EPA (1973), with David Schoenbrod caused the United States Environmental Protection Agency to begin reducing tetraethyl lead in gasoline sooner than they were going to.

NRDC opposed the Water Rights Protection Act, a bill that would prevent federal agencies from requiring certain entities to relinquish their water rights to the United States in order to use public lands.

NRDC supported the EPS Service Parts Act of 2014 (H.R. 5057; 113th Congress), a bill that would exempt certain external power supplies from complying with standards set forth in a final rule published by the United States Department of Energy in February 2014.

== Effect on administrative law ==
NRDC has been involved in the following Supreme Court cases interpreting United States administrative law.

- Vermont Yankee Nuclear Power Corp. v. Natural Resources Defense Council, Inc., 435 U.S. 519 (1978), which held that courts could not impose additional procedural requirements on administrative agencies beyond that required by the agency's organic statute or the Administrative Procedure Act.
- Chevron U.S.A., Inc. v. Natural Resources Defense Council, Inc., 467 U.S. 837 (1984), which gave administrative agencies broad discretion to interpret statute to make policy changes if Congressional intent was unclear.
- Baltimore Gas & Elec. Co. v. Natural Resources Defense Council, Inc., 462 U.S. 78 (1983) is a United States Supreme Court decision which held to be valid a Nuclear Regulatory Commission (NRC) rule that the permanent storage of nuclear waste should be assumed to have no environmental impact during the licensing of nuclear power plants.

== See also ==
- 1970 in the environment
- Anti-nuclear movement
- Biodiversity
- Building Codes Assistance Project
- Environmental impact of mining
- Environmental movement
- Environmental Protection Agency
- Global warming
- Green building in the United States
- Green politics
- Opposition to Pebble Mine
- United States Green Building Council
- Winter v. Natural Resources Defense Council, concerning the balance of possible harm and government interest when issuing preliminary injunctions
