= Gilberto de Jesús =

American lawyer and government official

- Born: New York City
- Education: Columbia University (B.A.); George Washington University (J.D.)
- Occupations: Lawyer, government official
- Office: Secretary of the Maryland Department of Juvenile Justice
- Political party: Democratic

Gilberto de Jesús is an American lawyer and government official who was the first Hispanic appointed to serve in a cabinet-level position in Maryland, where he served as Secretary of the Maryland Department of Juvenile Justice between 1997 and 1999. He was nominated by President Barack Obama to serve as Chief Counsel for Advocacy overseeing the Office of Advocacy, an independent office at the U.S. Small Business Administration.

== Biography ==
de Jesús was born in New York City. He received his B.A. from Columbia University in 1976 and J.D. from George Washington University in 1981.

From 1982 to 1987, he worked as an attorney in the Federal Communications Commission.

Between 1989 and 1997, he served as an assistant U.S. attorney in the District of Columbia and trial attorney in the Office of International Affairs in the United States Department of Justice.

In 1997, he was named by Governor Parris Glendening of Maryland to serve as Secretary of the Maryland Department of Juvenile Services, becoming the state's first Hispanic Cabinet secretary. Even though he was praised for being a skilled, and aggressive prosecutor in the homicide unit when he was selected from the U.S. attorney's office in D.C., he was also criticized for his lack of experience nor expertise in juvenile justice. He resigned from the cabinet on December 15, 1999.

From 1999 to 2000, de Jesús served as a consultant for the Maryland Hispanic Chamber of Commerce. He later served as an attorney advisor with the FCC’s Investigations & Hearings Division from 2000 to 2007.

From 2007 to 2008, de Jesús worked for U.S. Senator Benjamin Cardin and helped direct the Senator's work on the Committee on Small Business and Entrepreneurship.

From 2009 to 2016, he worked as a senior attorney in the Office of Communications and Business Opportunities at the FCC.

In September 2014, he was nominated by Barack Obama to be Chief Counsel for Advocacy at the Small Business Administration. However, he withdrew his nomination in March 2015.

de Jesus is currently the senior legal advisor to the Federal Motor Carrier Safety Administration (FMCSA), as well as the acting director of Office of Small and Disadvantaged Business Utilization at the United States Department of Transportation.
