= Negotiated rulemaking =

Process in American administrative law

Negotiated rulemaking is a process in American administrative law, used by federal agencies, in which representatives from a government agency and affected interest groups negotiate the terms of a proposed administrative rule. The agency publishes the proposed rule in the Federal Register and then follows the usual rulemaking procedure of soliciting public comments, which are evaluated for inclusion in the final rule.

== Origins ==
Negotiated rulemaking, sometimes abbreviated as "neg reg" or "reg neg", emerged most prominently in the early 1980s because of a concern that traditional rulemaking procedures had become too adversarial. John Dunlop, Secretary of Labor under President Gerald Ford, first introduced the idea of formally engaging affected interests in negotiations over federal regulations in the 1970s. In 1982 Phillip Harter, an administrative law expert, developed the idea of neg reg further in a report to the Administrative Conference of the United States and then a law review article, proposing negotiation as a means of alleviating the "malaise" that hindered the existing federal rulemaking process. The U.S. Environmental Protection Agency and the United States Department of Transportation were the first agencies to experiment with negotiated rulemaking. Other agencies were more reluctant to try it, out of concern about its legality. Those questions were answered when the United States Congress enacted the Negotiated Rulemaking Act of 1990 (Neg Reg Act), "to encourage agencies to use negotiated rulemaking when it enhances the informal rulemaking process." The Neg Reg Act was reauthorized in 1996 and is now incorporated into the Administrative Procedure Act, at 5 U.S.C. §§ 561-570.
A believer in the effectiveness of neg reg, President Clinton encouraged agencies to use the approach in Executive Order #12866 and in a subsequent Presidential Memorandum.

Although only a small fraction of all regulations have been developed through negotiated rulemaking, a variety of federal government agencies have used the procedure, including the U.S. Departments of Education, Housing and Urban Development, Health and Human Services, the Interior, Labor, and Transportation, and the U.S. Environmental Protection Agency. Negotiated rulemaking is currently required under the Higher Education Act and the Native American Housing Assistance and Self-Determination Act.

== Procedure ==
Usually, an agency is not mandated to use negotiated rulemaking, but does so by choice. Its decision to use negotiated rulemaking is not subject to review by the courts. An agency can publish a proposal adopted by its negotiating committee, but the Negotiated Rulemaking Act does not require it.

The decision to use negotiated rulemaking is based on a number of factors, including whether it is likely that a balanced committee can be formed and whether it is reasonable to believe that the committee will reach a consensus recommendation for a proposed rule. The agency's resources are also considered.

The use of a convener to determine the feasibility of undertaking a negotiated rulemaking is authorized under the Negotiated Rulemaking Act. A convener may also recommend a list of stakeholder representatives for participation on the neg reg advisory committee. Sometimes, the agency compiles its own list. Regardless, the proposed advisory committee members and the issues to be negotiated are published in the Federal Register and subject to public comment. People who feel they are under-represented on the committee can request membership.

Neg Regs are facilitated by a public policy mediator. Once established under the Federal Advisory Committee Act, the committee prepares a set of ground rules, which include the committee's deadline, mission, responsibilities, commitments, and a decision rule or definition of consensus. A final list of the issues to be negotiated is also created, and negotiators are provided with relevant background materials. With the public policy mediator providing focus and managing the negotiations, the committee discusses each issue striving for agreements in concept, which government staff draft as regulatory text. This draft text is reviewed and revised until a tentative consensus agreement is reached. If an early consensus cannot be reached, the drafting team outlines multiple options discussed. When tentative agreements are reached on all issues, the agreements are checked for consistency before final consensus is achieved. Negotiated rulemaking typically takes six months to a year and involves multi-day meetings approximately once a month.

== Successes and critiques ==
In a study published in 1997, University of Pennsylvania Law School Professor Cary Coglianese reported that negotiated rulemaking did not provide the benefits advocates of the procedure had promised, namely decreased litigation and more expeditious rulemaking. At the agency that had conducted the most rules developed with neg reg at the time of his research - the EPA - 50% of the negotiated rules resulted in litigation, compared with an overall rate closer to 25%. Coglianese also found that negotiated rulemaking did not save agencies any time.
In an article published in 2000, Philip Harter characterized Coglianese's research as possessing fundamental flaws, notably stating that he "misapplies his own methodology, incorrectly measures the duration of several negotiations, and fails to differentiate among different types of judicial challenges to negotiated rules." In a reply article, Coglianese rebutted Harter's criticisms, stating that "Harter makes unfounded assertions about [the original] study, disregards basic principles of empirical analysis, and continues to advance bold claims for negotiated rulemaking unsupported by reliable empirical analysis."

In a subsequent paper, public policy mediator Susan Podziba has argued that negotiated rulemaking allows the benefits of face-to-face interaction and cooperation. She has also claimed that it allows all parties to share information and take advantage of the different skill sets of committee members. Research conducted by Dr. Laura Langbein of the School of Public Affairs at American University indicated that rules developed through neg reg were perceived by survey respondents to be of better quality, more accurate and timelier than rules created using the traditional process. Coglianese has outlined several limitations in the Langbein study

Another criticism of negotiated rulemaking is that it subverts the public interest because special interest groups have too much sway. Professor Jody Freeman of Harvard Law School argues against this idea and asserts that the phrase "public interest" is far too vague to act as a variable in the assessment of negotiated rulemaking.

In 2006, the U.S. Department of the Interior and the U.S. Environmental Protection Agency Public co-sponsored a workshop to reflect on lessons learned during past negotiated rulemakings conducted throughout the federal government. According to background materials prepared for the workshop, more than 30 federal negotiated rulemakings occurred between 1996 and 2005, including the No Child Left Behind Act, Off-Road Vehicle Regulations at Cape Cod National Seashore, and Worker Safety Standards for the Use of Cranes and Derricks in Construction.
