= William DuBay =

American Catholic priest and activist (1934–2022)

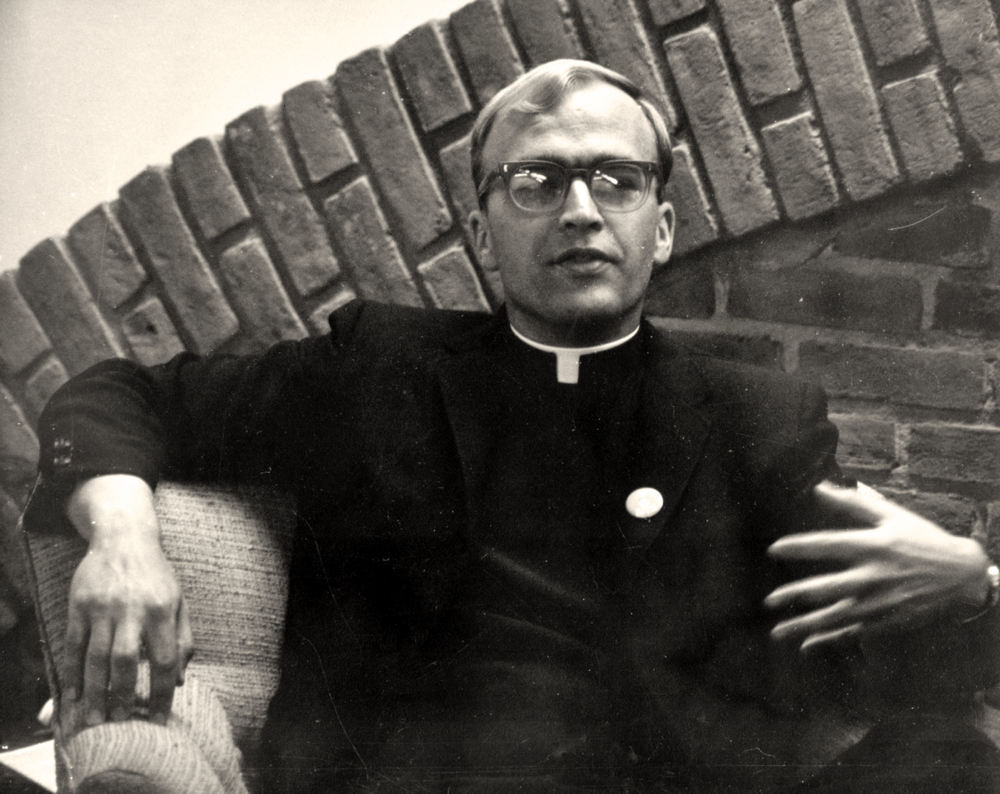
DuBay about 1968, Los Angeles

William Henry DuBay (December 24, 1934 – January 13, 2022) was an American Catholic priest and activist whose activities and suspension from the priesthood created controversy in the mid-1960s. He published widely on church reform, the rights of ethnic and sexual minorities, and plain language.

== Early life ==
Born on December 24, 1934, in Long Beach, California, William Heney DuBay attended public and Catholic schools before entering Los Angeles College Junior Seminary at the age of 13. After graduating and attending St. John's Major Seminary in Camarillo, California, he was ordained in the Jesuit order for the Roman Catholic Archdiocese of Los Angeles in May 1960.

== Ordained ministry ==
While stationed in a segregated white section of San Fernando Valley, DuBay became interested in the civil rights movement. After publishing a Sunday newsletter calling on Catholics to support integration, he was disciplined by Cardinal James Francis McIntyre and sent to a racially mixed parish in Compton, California. While there, he attempted to organize other priests who also had been disciplined to protest the cardinal's racial policies.

In June 1964, he sent a cable to Pope Paul VI asking him to remove Cardinal McIntyre from office as Archbishop of Los Angeles for "conducting a vicious campaign of intimidation against priests, nuns, and lay Catholics" supporting the civil rights movement.

DuBay wrote:

"His Eminence has condemned direct action demonstrations on the grounds that they incite violence. But as a matter of fact he has contributed to the possibility of serious racial violence by depriving civil rights groups of responsible Catholic and clerical leadership necessary to encourage Christian forms of nonviolent protest. His inaction has promoted the prolongation of Negro grievances by failing to mobilize the Catholic population against the social evils of segregation.

DuBay was again reassigned, first to St. Boniface Church in Anaheim and then as chaplain at St. John's Hospital in Santa Monica.

In February 1966, DuBay was suspended from the priesthood for publishing The Human Church, which called for democratizing the Catholic Church. It recommended that the people elect bishops for limited terms. It called for abandoning the parochial school system in favor of programs that teach Catholics the principles of Christian action. The book argued that the Catholic Church should abandon its tax exemptions and let individual congregations create their own liturgies and creeds.

Citing DuBay's "public expressions of insubordination" and a lack of the bishop's imprimatur, the Vatican ordered DuBay to cease selling and distributing his book. DuBay protested that "prior censorship is a ghost that has been hovering around the Catholic Church since the Spanish Inquisition" and refused to stop distributing The Human Church.

== Post-suspension ==
In 1968, DuBay married Mary Ellen Wall of Seattle. They had one son. The couple divorced in 1971. That year DuBay came out as gay and became involved in the gay rights movement. He moved to Seattle, where he worked two years in a residential treatment center and another two years managing a health-food store. In 1975, he moved to Ninilchik, Alaska, where he lived on a homestead for two years.

From 1977 to 1985, while working for the mayor's office of the North Slope Borough, he published the Arctic Coastal Zone Management Newsletter and The Arctic Policy Review, both monthly publications that covered arctic-resource conflicts between the multinational oil firms and local Iñupiat.

Beginning in 1985, DuBay worked for the health program of the non-profit Aleutian Pribilof Islands Association.

In 1987, he returned to southern California, where he worked as a technical writer, first for Ashton-Tate and then for Phoenix Technologies. During that time, he published Gay Identity: The Self Under Ban, a sociological study of the homosexual role.

== Post-retirement ==
In 2001, he retired from technical writing to become a plain-language consultant. In 2003, he began publishing The Plain Language at Work Newsletter.

He self-published on Amazon three books on plain language: The Principles of Readability, Smart Language: Readers, Readability, and the Grading of Text, and Unlocking Language: The Classic Readability Studies.

DuBay was the author of a blog, Civic Language: Comments on Current Events and Building Social Capital. On that page is a three-part essay, The Roots of the Holocaust, about the youth of Adolf Hitler in Austria.

in 2016, DuBay self-published on Amazon The Priest and the Cardinal: Race and Rebellion in 1960s Los Angeles, a memoir about his conflict with Cardinal McIntyre over the civil rights movement.

Many of DuBay's papers concerning this conflict with can be found in the Special Collections of the Doheny Library of the University of Southern California.

DuBay later lived and wrote on Whidbey Island near Seattle, Washington.

DuBay died on January 13, 2022, at the age of 87.

== Bibliography ==
- The Human Church (Garden City, NY: Doubleday, 1966)
- Gay Identity: The Self Under Ban (Jefferson, NC: McFarland & Co., Inc, 1987)
- The Principles of Readability (Costa Mesa, CA: Impact Information, 2004)
- Smart Language: Readers, Readability, and the Grading of Text (Costa Mesa, CA; Impact Information. 2007)
- Unlocking Language: The Classic Readability Studies (Costa Mesa, CA: Impact Information, 2007)
- The Priest and the Cardinal: Race and Rebellion in 1960s Los Angeles (Charleston, SC: CreateSpace, 2016)
