= Federal Reports Act =

The Federal Reports Act of 1942 (Pub. L. 77–831) was signed into law on December 24, 1942. It coordinated United States federal reporting requirements in order to eliminate duplication and reduce costs and burdens on potential respondents. It was effectively overwritten by the Paperwork Reduction Act of 1980 and its amendments, which closed a number of loopholes in the Federal Reports Act and added tougher penalties for noncompliance.

"The Federal Reports Act, as implemented by OMB Circular No. A-40, permits the director of OMB to disapprove any request for a Federal agency for collecting identical information from 10 or more respondents or a similar recordkeeping requirement."
