= Independent agencies of the United States federal government =

Agencies that exist outside of the federal executive departments

In the United States federal government, independent agencies are agencies that exist outside the federal executive departments (those headed by a Cabinet secretary) and the Executive Office of the President. In a narrower sense, the term refers only to those independent agencies that, while considered part of the executive branch, have regulatory or rulemaking authority and were insulated from presidential control, usually because the president's power to dismiss the agency head or a member was limited.

Established through separate statutes passed by Congress, each respective statutory grant of authority defines the goals the agency must work towards, as well as what substantive areas, if any, over which it may have the power of rulemaking. These agency rules (or regulations), when in force, have the power of federal law.

== Executive and regulatory agencies ==
Independent agencies exist outside the federal executive departments (those headed by a Cabinet secretary) and the Executive Office of the President. There is a further distinction between independent executive agencies and independent regulatory agencies, which have been assigned rulemaking responsibilities or authorities by Congress. The Paperwork Reduction Act lists 19 enumerated "independent regulatory agencies", such as the Securities and Exchange Commission, the Federal Reserve, the Commodity Futures Trading Commission, the Federal Deposit Insurance Corporation, and the Consumer Financial Protection Bureau. Generally, the heads of independent regulatory agencies could only be removed for cause, but Cabinet members and heads of independent executive agencies, such as the head of the Environmental Protection Agency, serve "at the pleasure of the president" and can be removed without cause.

The degree to which the president has the power to use executive orders to set policy for independent executive agencies is disputed. Many orders specifically exempt independent agencies, but some do not. Executive Order 12866 has been a particular matter of controversy; it requires cost-benefit analysis for certain regulatory actions.

=== Structure of regulatory agencies ===
Independent agencies can be distinguished from the federal executive departments and other executive agencies by their structural and functional characteristics. Their officers can be protected from removal by the president, they can be controlled by a board that cannot be appointed all at once, and the board can be required to be bipartisan.

Presidential attempts to remove independent agency officials have generated most of the important Supreme Court legal opinions in this area. In 1935, the Supreme Court in the case of Humphrey's Executor v. United States decided that although the president had the power to remove officials from agencies that were "an arm or an eye of the executive", it upheld statutory limitations on the president's power to remove officers of administrative bodies that performed quasi-legislative or quasi-judicial functions, such as the Federal Trade Commission. Presidents normally do have the authority to remove regular executive agency heads at will, but they must meet the statutory requirements for removal of commissioners of independent agencies, such as demonstrating incapacity, neglect of duty, malfeasance, or other good cause. This precedent was weakened in 2025 when the Supreme Court issued an unsigned emergency stay in the case of Wilcox v. Trump, reversing a temporary injunction issued by a district court (which was reversed by a three-judge panel but then affirmed by the full DC Circuit Court). This allowed the removal of Gwynne Wilcox, head of the independent National Labor Relations Board, during the court case contesting the process and cause of her firing. In 2026, in the case of Trump v. Slaughter, the Supreme Court overturned Humphrey's Executor v. United States and ruled that statutory limitations on the president's power to remove officials from the Federal Trade Commission are "contrary to the separation of powers enshrined in the constitution." Notably, however, in 2026, in the case of Trump v. Cook, the court upheld the removal protections for the Federal Reserve, citing "our Nation’s tradition of central banking protected from political interference."

While most executive agencies have a single director, administrator, or secretary appointed by the president of the United States, independent agencies (in the narrower sense of being outside presidential control) almost always have a commission, board, or similar collegial body consisting of five to seven members who share power over the agency. (This is why many independent agencies include the word "Commission" or "Board" in their name.) The president appoints the commissioners or board members, subject to Senate confirmation, but they often serve terms that are staggered and longer than a four-year presidential term, meaning that most presidents will not have the opportunity to appoint all the commissioners of a given independent agency. In addition, most independent agencies have a statutory requirement of bipartisan membership on the commission, so the president cannot simply fill vacancies with members of his own political party. The president can normally designate which commissioner will serve as the chairperson.

Congress can designate certain agencies explicitly as "independent" in the governing statute, but the functional differences have more legal significance. In reality, the high turnover rate among these commissioners or board members means that most presidents have the opportunity to fill enough vacancies to constitute a voting majority on each independent agency commission within the first two years of the first term as president. In some famous instances, presidents have found the independent agencies more loyal and in lockstep with the president's wishes and policy objectives than some dissenters among the executive agency political appointments.

Although Congress can pass statutes limiting the circumstances under which the president can remove commissioners of independent agencies, if the independent agency exercises any executive powers like enforcement, and most of them do, Congress cannot reserve removal power over executive officers to itself. Constitutionally, Congress can only remove officers through impeachment proceedings. Members of Congress cannot serve as commissioners on independent agencies that have executive powers, nor can Congress itself appoint the commissioners – the Appointments Clause of the Constitution vests that power in the president. The Senate does participate, however, in appointments through "advice and consent", which occurs through confirmation hearings and votes on the president's nominees.

== Examples of independent agencies ==
These agencies are not represented in the cabinet and are not part of the Executive Office of the President:

- The Central Intelligence Agency (CIA) gathers foreign intelligence and provides national security assessments to policymakers in the United States. It acts as the primary human intelligence provider outside of the United States for the federal government. It is one of the principal members of the Intelligence Community, which is overseen by the Office of the Director of National Intelligence (ODNI), which is itself an independent agency.
- The Chemical Safety and Hazard Investigation Board (CSB) investigates industrial and chemical accidents and safety hazards.
- The Commodity Futures Trading Commission (CFTC) regulates commodity futures and option markets in the United States. The agency protects market participants against manipulation, abusive trade practices, and fraud. Through oversight and regulation, the CFTC enables the markets to serve better their important functions in the US economy, providing a mechanism for price discovery and a means of offsetting price risk.
- The Consumer Financial Protection Bureau (CFPB) is responsible for consumer protection in the financial sector. Its jurisdiction includes banks, credit unions, securities firms, payday lenders, mortgage-servicing operations, foreclosure relief services, debt collectors, other financial companies in the United States.
- The Consumer Product Safety Commission (CPSC) evaluates and promotes the safety of consumer products.
- The Election Assistance Commission (EAC) was formed in 2002 to serve as a national clearinghouse and resource of information regarding election administration. It is charged with administering payments to states and developing guidance to meet the Help America Vote Act (HAVA) requirements, adopting voluntary voting system guidelines, and accrediting voting system test laboratories and certifying voting equipment. It is also charged with developing and maintaining a national mail voter registration form.
- The Environmental Protection Agency (EPA) works with state and local governments throughout the United States to control and abate environmental pollution and to address problems related to solid waste, pesticides, radiation, and toxic substances. The EPA sets and enforces standards for air, soil and water quality, evaluates the impact of pesticides and chemical substances, and manages the Superfund program for cleaning toxic waste sites.
- The Export–Import Bank of the United States (EXIM) is the official export credit agency (ECA) of the United States federal government. Operating as a wholly owned federal government corporation, the bank "assists in financing and facilitating U.S. exports of goods and services", particularly when private sector lenders are unable or unwilling to provide financing.
- The Federal Communications Commission (FCC) is charged with regulating interstate and international communications by radio, television, wire, satellite, and cable. It licenses radio and television broadcast stations, assigns radio frequencies, and enforces regulations designed to ensure that cable rates are reasonable. The FCC regulates common carriers, such as telephone and telegraph companies, as well as wireless telecommunications service providers.
- The Federal Deposit Insurance Corporation (FDIC) provides deposit insurance to depositors in U.S. commercial banks and savings banks. The FDIC was created by the 1933 Banking Act, enacted during the Great Depression to restore trust in the American banking system. Member banks' insurance dues are the primary source of funding.
- The Federal Election Commission (FEC) oversees campaign financing for all federal elections. The commission oversees election rules as well as reporting of campaign contributions by the candidates.
- The Federal Energy Regulatory Commission (FERC) is the United States federal agency with jurisdiction over interstate electricity sales, wholesale electric rates, hydroelectric licensing, natural gas pricing, and oil pipeline rates. FERC also reviews and authorizes liquefied natural gas (LNG) terminals, interstate natural gas pipelines, and non-federal hydropower projects.
- The Federal Housing Finance Agency (FHFA) regulates Fannie Mae, Freddie Mac, and the 11 Federal Home Loan Banks.
- The Federal Maritime Commission (FMC) regulates the international ocean transportation of the United States. It is charged with ensuring a competitive and efficient ocean transportation system.
- The Federal Mediation and Conciliation Service (FMCS) created in 1947, is an independent agency whose mission is to preserve and promote labor-management peace and cooperation. Headquartered in Washington, DC, with six regions comprising more than 60 field and home offices, the agency provides mediation and conflict resolution services to industry, government agencies and communities.

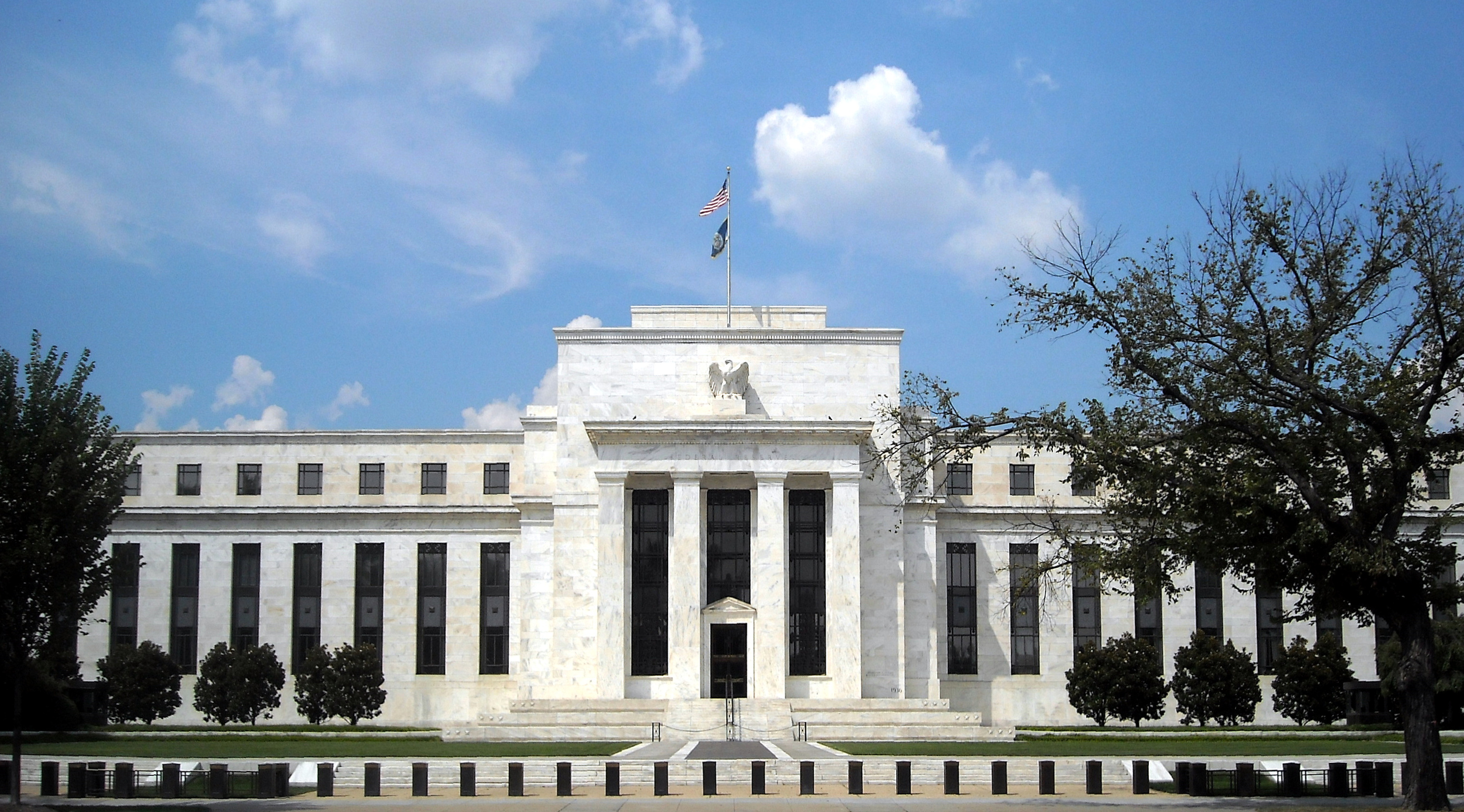
The headquarters of the Federal Reserve System

- The Federal Reserve System (often called "the Fed"), is the central bank of the United States. It conducts the nation's monetary policy by influencing the volume of credit and money in circulation. The Federal Reserve regulates private banking institutions, works to contain systemic risk in financial markets, and provides certain financial services to the federal government, the public, and financial institutions.
- The Federal Retirement Thrift Investment Board (FRTIB) is one of the smaller Executive Branch agencies, with just over 100 employees. It was established to administer the Thrift Savings Plan (TSP), which provides federal employees the opportunity to save for additional retirement security. The Thrift Savings Plan is a tax-deferred defined contribution plan similar to a private sector 401(k) plan.
- The Federal Trade Commission (FTC) enforces federal antitrust and consumer protection laws by investigating complaints against individual companies initiated by consumers, businesses, congressional inquiries, or reports in the media. The commission seeks to ensure that the nation's markets function competitively by eliminating unfair or deceptive practices.
- The General Services Administration (GSA) is responsible for the purchase, supply, operation, and maintenance of federal property, buildings, and equipment, and for the sale of surplus items. GSA also manages the federal motor vehicle fleet and oversees remote work centers and civilian child care centers.
- The International Trade Commission (ITC) provides trade expertise to both the legislative and executive branches of the federal government, determines the impact of imports on US industries, and directs actions against certain unfair trade practices, such as patent, trademark, and copyright infringement.
- The National Aeronautics and Space Administration (NASA) is the federal government's space agency. It is responsible for the civilian space program as well as aeronautics and aerospace research.
- The National Archives and Records Administration (NARA) preserves the nation's history by overseeing the management of all federal records. The holdings of the National Archives include original textual materials, motion picture films, sound and video recordings, maps, still pictures, and computer data. The Declaration of Independence, the US Constitution, and the Bill of Rights are preserved and displayed at the National Archives building in Washington, D.C.
- The National Credit Union Administration (NCUA), government backer of credit unions, equivalent to the FDIC.
- The National Labor Relations Board (NLRB) administers the principal United States labor law, the National Labor Relations Act. The board is vested with the power to prevent or remedy unfair labor practices and to safeguard employees' rights to organize and determine through elections whether to have a union as their bargaining representative.
- The National Science Foundation (NSF) supports fundamental research and education in all the non-medical fields of science and engineering.
- The National Transportation Safety Board (NTSB) is responsible for civil transportation accident analysis in the US. The NTSB investigates and reports on aviation accidents and incidents, certain types of car accidents, ship and marine accidents, pipeline transport accidents, and rail transport accidents.
- The Nuclear Regulatory Commission (NRC) was established by the Energy Reorganization Act of 1974 from the United States Atomic Energy Commission, and opened January 19, 1975. The NRC oversees reactor safety and security, reactor licensing and renewal, radioactive material safety, and spent fuel management (storage, security, recycling, and disposal). In 2025, President Donald Trump effectively ended its independence through a series of executive orders directing specific reforms.
- The Office of Special Counsel (OSC) is a permanent investigative and prosecutorial agency that operates a secure channel for federal whistleblower disclosures, protects federal employees from reprisal for whistleblowing, and enforces the restrictions of the Hatch Act on partisan political activity by government employees.
- The Peace Corps was created in 1961 by an executive order of President Kennedy, originally under the State Department but reorganized as an independent agency by President Nixon. Peace Corps' goal is to assist developing countries by providing skilled workers in fields such as education, health, entrepreneurship, women's empowerment, or community development.
- The Postal Regulatory Commission (PRC) was created in 1971 as the Postal Rate Commission and strengthened under the Postal Accountability and Enhancement Act enacted in December 2006. Provides regulatory oversight over the activities of the United States Postal Service.
- The Securities and Exchange Commission (SEC) was established to protect investors who buy stocks and bonds. Federal laws require companies that plan to raise money by selling their own securities to file reports about their operations with the SEC, so that investors have access to all material information. The commission has powers to prevent or punish fraud in the sale of securities and is authorized to regulate stock exchanges.
- The Selective Service System (SSS) is an independent federal agency operating with permanent authorization under the Military Selective Service Act. It is not part of the Department of Defense; however, it exists to serve the emergency manpower needs of the military by conscripting untrained men, or personnel with professional health care skills, if directed by Congress and the president. Its statutory missions also include being ready to administer an alternative service program, in lieu of military service for men classified as conscientious objectors.
- The Small Business Administration (SBA) was created in 1953 to advise, assist, and protect the interests of small business concerns. The SBA guarantees loans to small businesses, aids victims of floods and other natural disasters, promotes the growth of minority-owned firms, and helps secure contracts for small businesses to supply goods and services to the federal government.
- The Social Security Administration (SSA) is the United States federal agency that administers Social Security, a social insurance program consisting of retirement, disability, and survivors' benefits. To qualify for these benefits, most American workers pay Social Security taxes on their earnings; future benefits are based on employee contributions.
- The Surface Transportation Board (STB) was created in the ICC Termination Act of 1995 and is the successor agency to the Interstate Commerce Commission. The STB is an economic regulatory agency that Congress charged with resolving railroad rate and service disputes and reviewing proposed railroad mergers. The STB is decisionally independent, although it is administratively affiliated with the Department of Transportation.
- The Tennessee Valley Authority (TVA), created in 1933, provides economic development to the Tennessee Valley, a region particularly affected by the Great Depression.
- The United States Agency for International Development (USAID), created in 1961 to provide foreign aid and assist with international development. In 2025, President Trump's administration terminated most of the agency’s programs and rolled the remaining programs into the State Department, but only an act of Congress can formally abolish the agency.
- The United States Office of Personnel Management (OPM) manages the United States federal civil service by providing federal human resources policy, oversight, and support, and tends to healthcare (FEHB), life insurance (FEGLI), and retirement benefits (CSRS and FERS, but not TSP) for federal government employees, retirees, and their dependents. It is headed by a director, who is nominated by the President.

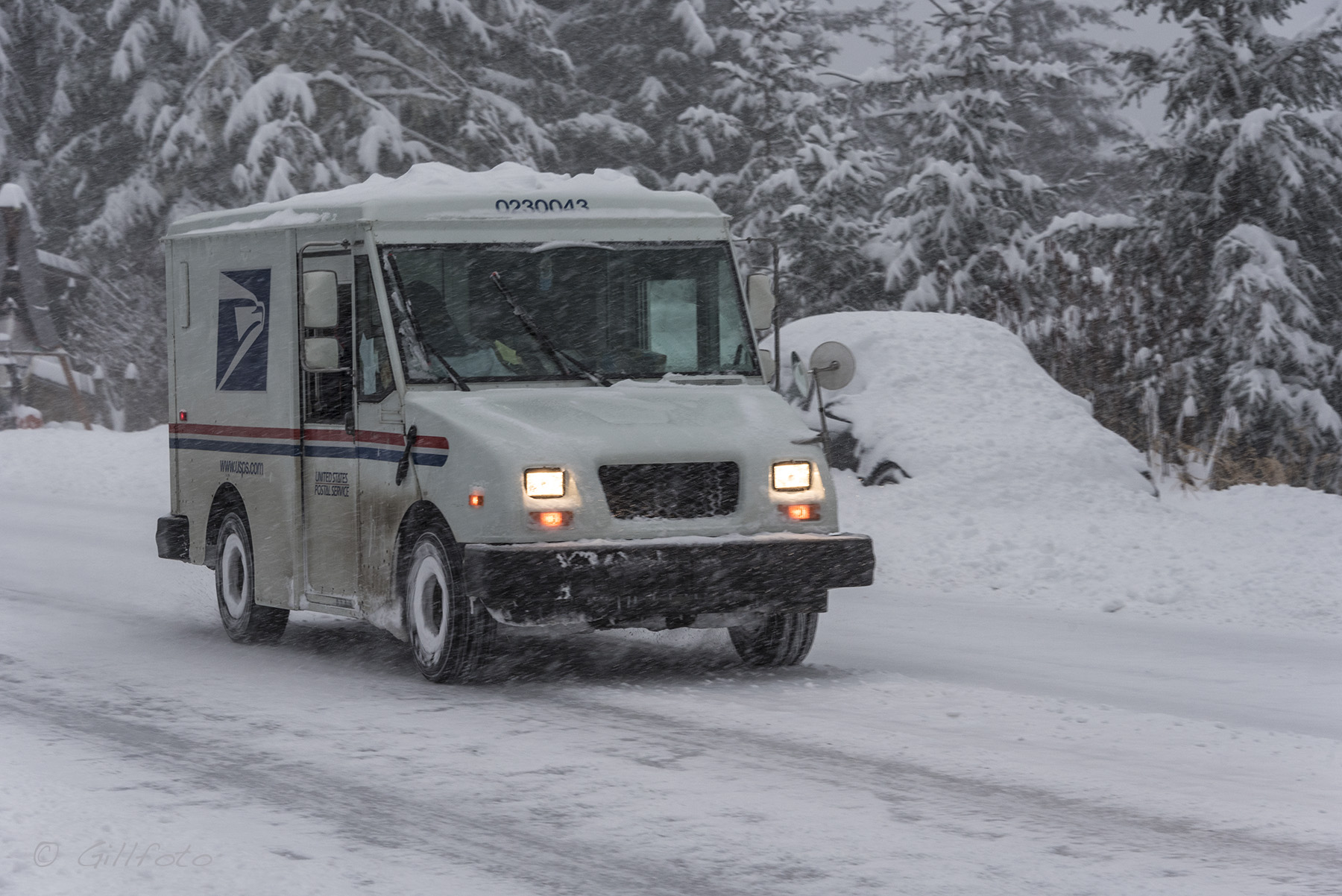
A USPS truck in the snow

- The United States Postal Service (USPS) is defined by statute as an "independent establishment" of the federal government, which replaced the Cabinet-level Post Office Department in 1971. The Postal Service is responsible for the collection, transportation, and delivery of the mails, and for the operation of thousands of local post offices across the country. It also provides international mail service through the Universal Postal Union and other agreements with foreign countries.
- The United States Trade and Development Agency (USTDA), which advances economic development and U.S. commercial interests in developing and middle income countries.

=== Former agencies ===
- The Committee on Public Information was an agency created to influence US public opinion regarding American participation in World War I. Lasting from April 14, 1917, to June 30, 1919 it was directed by George Creel. The agency used propaganda available to achieve its goals.
- The Interstate Commerce Commission regulated common carriers and was thus able to render far reaching orders, such as the desegregation of public transportation. After trucking and railroads were largely deregulated, the ICC was replaced with the independent Surface Transportation Board, with remaining functions transferred to the Department of Transportation.
- The United States Maritime Commission was intended to formulate a merchant shipbuilding program to design and build five hundred modern merchant cargo ships for the US Merchant Marine. It also formed the United States Maritime Service. In 1950, its functions were transferred to the United States Maritime Administration, which later became part of the Department of Transportation.
- The Reconstruction Finance Corporation was designed to help finance projects during the Great Depression. It later helped finance the nation's military buildup as World War II approached. Scandals led to its eventual dissolution in 1956.
- The Atomic Energy Commission was established for peacetime development of atomic energy. In 1974 it was abolished, and two new agencies were created; the Nuclear Regulatory Commission (NRC) for regulation of civilian uses of nuclear materials, such as nuclear power plants and medical uses, and the Energy Research and Development Administration (ERDA) for military development of nuclear materials. In 1977, the ERDA was merged with the Federal Energy Administration to form the United States Department of Energy.
- The Office of the United States Nuclear Waste Negotiator was responsible for the placement and long term storage of radioactive waste. It was dissolved in 1995.
- The United States Information Agency, which was partially merged into the Department of State in 1999.

== Agencies outside of executive branch ==
Although not officially part of the executive branch, these agencies are required by federal statute to release certain information about their programs and activities into the Federal Register, the daily journal of government activities:

- Fannie Mae, or the Federal National Mortgage Association (FNMA)
- Freddie Mac, or the Federal Home Loan Mortgage Corporation (FHLMC)
- The National Gallery of Art
- The Smithsonian Institution (SI) is an independent establishment of the United States created by an act of Congress on August 10, 1846. The SI conducts scientific and scholarly research; publishes the results of studies, explorations, and investigations; organizes exhibits representative of the arts, the sciences, American history, and world culture; and engages in educational programming and national and international cooperative research. Most of the National Museums in Washington, D.C., are part of the Smithsonian.

== Proposed independent agencies ==
- Federal Elections Agency, proposed by Lee Drutman of New America, which would merge the roles of the Federal Election Commission and Election Assistance Commission, expand enforcement against election interference and gather election data
- Weather Modification Operations and Research Board, proposed by Kay Bailey Hutchison to promote research into weather modification
- Nuclear Waste Administration, proposed by Lisa Murkowski to provide for the permanent disposal of spent nuclear fuel and high-level radioactive waste.

== See also ==
- Federal executive departments
- List of U.S. federal agencies
- Regulatory agency
- State-owned enterprises of the United States
- Unitary executive theory
