= John H. Adams (environmentalist) =

American activist

- Born: February 15, 1936 (age 90)
- Education: Michigan State University (B.A. in history); Duke University School of Law (LL.B.)
- Organization: Natural Resources Defense Council (NRDC)
- Awards: Presidential Medal of Freedom, 2010

John Hamilton Adams (born February 15, 1936) is an environmental activist, lawyer, and founder of the Natural Resource Defense Council (NRDC). He co-founded the NRDC in 1970 and served as the executive director until 1998 when he became the President. As of 2006, Adams is the Founding Director of the organization. With the help of his team at the NRDC, Adams has worked on numerous environmental movements including passing the Clean Water Act, phasing of lead from gasoline, and curbing the emissions of coal-burning power plants.

Adams has authored three books and written many research papers. In 2010, Adams received the Presidential Medal of Freedom for his achievements in environmental activism.

== Early life and education ==
Adams was born February 15, 1936, in New York City, to John and Barbara Adams. He lived on a farm in upstate New York for some of his childhood. John married Patricia Brandon Smith (now Patricia Brandon Adams) on September 30, 1963. She is a teacher, writer, and environmentalist. They have three children: Katherine L., John H., and Ramsay W, and six grandchildren.

Adams graduated from Michigan State University with a Bachelor of Arts in history in 1959. He then attended Duke University School of Law in 1962 to pursue his law degree and received his L.L.B.. In 2005, Adams received an honorary Doctor of Laws from Duke University.

== Career ==
Adams worked as the Assistant U.S. Attorney for the Southern District of New York for five years before joining with a young group of lawyers from Yale to pursue funding from the Ford Foundation to start up the NRDC in 1970. This organization was the first of its kind: a national environmental advocacy group creating change through the legal system. Adams was inspired by similar organizations in different fields, namely the ACLU and the NAACP, to conduct activism at a legal level.

Adams was NRDC's first executive director and held the position till 1998. During this time, he also was an adjunct faculty member at New York University's Law School for 26 years, founding the NYU/NRDC Environmental Law Clinic. He then held the position of President till 2006. While under Adam's leadership, the NRDC had many notable accomplishments:

In 2006, John Adams stepped down from the role as president but will indefinitely remain as the founding director of the NRDC, playing an active role in the organization at the local, national, and international levels. As of 2020, he serves on the board of the Open Space Institute, Woods Hole Research Center, and the League of Conservation Voters, among others.

=== Research and publications ===
Adams has published several research reports. In 1992, he published “The Mainstream Environmental Movement” in the EPA Journal; the piece recounts the environmental racism working in urban planning. He discusses how toxic waste facilities are placed more frequently in minority, specifically Black or Latino, spaces.

In 1998, Adams published “Salt in the Wounds” in the Amicus Journal in which he exposes the Mitsubishi Corp for the industrial saltwork operation which led to the environmental degradation of the Laguna Ojo de Liebre in Baja California, Mexico. He explains how saltwork has caused devastating harm to the ecosystem, including killing many endangered black sea turtles.

Adams published his first book in 1985. As of 2020, Adams has published a total of three books: An Environmental Agenda for the Future (1985), A Force for Nature: The Story of NRDC and Its Fight to Save our Planet (2010), and A Force for the Future: Inside NRDC’s Fight to Save the Planet and Its People (2020)

== Awards ==
=== Presidential Medal of Freedom ===
Adams' most notable award, the Presidential Medal of Freedom, was awarded to him by President Obama in 2010 for his extreme dedication and efforts advocating for the preservation of the environment. The Presidential Medal of Freedom is the highest honor a civilian can receive. Upon receiving the award, Adams says:

"For forty years I've been privileged to live out my passion, standing up for the natural inheritance that belongs to us all. In receiving this great honor today, I stand on the shoulders of a remarkable NRDC team, and of Americans everywhere, who love this country and believe we share a common duty to safeguard the waters that nourish us, the wildlife that inspires us, the air that sustains us and the land we call home. This is our country. It is ours to cherish; it is ours to protect. That is how we keep faith with future generations. And I thank the President for recognizing this high calling and the contribution I've been privileged to make."

— John H. Adams

=== House of Representatives tribute ===
In 2005, John Adams was given the honor of having a tribute from the house of representatives in which his most notable efforts and achievements are highlighted. Maurice Hinchey of New York presented Adams’ honors in the house of representatives.

=== Endowed Professorship at Duke University Law School ===
Adam's alma mater, Duke University Law School, endowed a professorship in his honor in 2017. This professorship's funding has commitments of over a million US dollars from individuals and the Duke Endowment.

=== Other ===
Some of Adams' less notable awards include:

One World One Child Lifetime Achievement Award (2005), NRDC's Forces For Nature Award (2005), the Wilderness Society's Robert Marshall Award (2005), the Natural Resources Council of America's Award of Honor (2001), the Green Cross Millennium Award for Individual Environmental Leadership (2000), the Judge Lumbard Cup for public service from the United States, the National Conservation Achievement Award from the National Wildlife Federation (1999), the Francis K. Hutchinson Conservation Award from the Garden Club of America (1990), Duke University's Distinguished Alumni Award, and in 1992, Duke University Law School's Charles J. Murphy Award.
