= Administrative Procedure Act =

US federal statute

Administrative Procedure Act of 1946
- Long title: An Act to improve the administration of justice by prescribing fair administrative procedure.
- Acronyms (colloquial): APA
- Enacted by: the 79th United States Congress
- Effective: June 11, 1946

Citations
- Public law: 79-404
- Statutes at Large: 60 Stat. 237

Codification
- Titles amended: 5 U.S.C.: Government Organization and Employees
- U.S.C. sections created: 5 U.S.C. ch. 5, subch. I § 500 et seq. 5 U.S.C. ch. 7 § 701 et seq.

Legislative history
- Introduced in the Senate as S. 7 by Patrick McCarran (D–NV) on October 19, 1945; Committee consideration by Senate Judiciary Committee, House Judiciary Committee; Signed into law by President Harry S. Truman on June 11, 1946

Major amendments
- Freedom of Information Act; Recodified by Pub. L. 89–554, Sept. 6, 1966, 80 Stat. 383

United States Supreme Court cases
- Citizens to Preserve Overton Park v. Volpe (1971); Sierra Club v. Morton (1972); Vermont Yankee Nuclear Power Corp. v. NRDC (1978); Heckler v. Chaney (1985); Norton v. Southern Utah Wilderness Alliance (2004); Perez v. Mortgage Bankers Ass'n (2015); Army Corps of Engineers v. Hawkes Co. (2016); Department of Homeland Security v. Regents of the University of California (2020); Corner Post, Inc. v. Board of Governors of the Federal Reserve System (2024); Loper Bright Enterprises v. Raimondo (2024)

The Administrative Procedure Act (APA), (Pub. L. 79–404, ch. 324, 60 Stat. 237, enacted Jun 11, 1946, is the United States federal statute that governs the way in which administrative agencies of the federal government of the United States may propose and establish regulations, and it grants U.S. federal courts oversight over all agency actions. According to Hickman & Pierce, it is one of the most important pieces of United States administrative law, and serves as a sort of "constitution" for U.S. administrative law.

The APA applies to both the federal executive departments and the independent agencies. U.S. senator Pat McCarran called the APA "a bill of rights for the hundreds of thousands of Americans whose affairs are controlled or regulated" by federal government agencies. The text of the APA can be found under Title 5 of the United States Code, beginning at Section 500. Section 702 of the APA waives sovereign immunity, allowing people to sue a federal agency in court for non-monetary relief, such as an injunction or a declaratory judgment.

There is a similar Model State Administrative Procedure Act (Model State APA), which was drafted by the National Conference of Commissioners on Uniform State Laws for oversight of state agencies. Not all states have adopted the model law wholesale, as of 2017. The federal APA does not require systematic oversight of regulations prior to adoption, unlike the Model APA. Each US state has passed its own version of the Administrative Procedure Act.

== Historical background ==
Beginning in 1933, President Franklin D. Roosevelt and the Democratic Congress enacted several statutes that created new federal agencies as part of the New Deal legislative plan, established to guide the United States through the social and economic hardship caused by the Great Depression. However, the Congress became concerned about the expanding powers that these autonomous federal agencies now possessed, resulting in the enactment of the APA to regulate, standardize and oversee these federal agencies.

The APA was born in a contentious political environment. Professor George Shepard claims that Roosevelt's opponents and supporters fought over passage of the APA "in a pitched political battle for the life of the New Deal" itself. Shepard notes, however, that a legislative balance was struck with the APA, expressing "the nation's decision to permit extensive government, but to avoid dictatorship and central planning."

A 1946 House of Representatives report discusses the 10-year period of "painstaking and detailed study and drafting" that went into the APA. Because of rapid growth in the administrative regulation of private conduct, Roosevelt ordered several studies of administrative methods and conduct during the early part of his four-term presidency. Based on one study, Roosevelt commented that the practice of creating administrative agencies with the authority to perform both legislative and judicial work "threatens to develop a fourth branch of government for which there is no sanction in the Constitution".

In 1939, Roosevelt requested for Attorney General Frank Murphy to form a committee to investigate practices and procedures in American administrative law and suggest improvements. That committee's report, the Final Report of Attorney General's Committee on Administrative Procedure, contained detailed information about the development and procedures of the federal agencies.

The Final Report defined a federal agency as a governmental unit with "the power to determine ... private rights and obligations" by rulemaking or adjudication. The report applied that definition to the largest units of the federal government, and identified "nine executive departments and eighteen independent agencies". Overall, 51 federal agencies were identified in the report after including various subdivisions within the larger units. In reviewing the history of federal agencies, the Final Report noted that almost all agencies had undergone changes in name and political function.

Of the 51 federal agencies discussed in the Final Report, 11 were created by statute before the American Civil War. From 1865 to 1900, six new agencies were created, notably the Interstate Commerce Commission in 1887 in response to widespread criticism of the railroad industry. From 1900 to 1930, seventeen agencies were created by statute, and eighteen more had been created since. The Final Report made several recommendations about standardizing administrative procedures, but Congress delayed action as the US entered World War II. Five years after the report was made, Congress reintroduced the bill and President Harry S. Truman signed the APA into law on June 11, 1946.

In 1966, the Freedom of Information Act amended the APA to establish a system that requires federal agencies to disclose government information to the public. In response to the Watergate and COINTELPRO scandals, two further amendments were passed. The Privacy Act of 1974 amended the APA to cover the government's handling of personal information, and in 1976, the Government in the Sunshine Act further clarified what portion of government meetings and documents were required to be public.

The Paperwork Reduction Act (1980), the Regulatory Flexibility Act (1980), and the Electronic Freedom of Information Act (1996) were further adjustments.

== Basic purposes ==
Although each US government agency is constituted within one branch of the government (judicial, legislative, or executive), an agency's authority often extends into the functions of other branches. Without careful regulation, that can lead to unchecked authority in a particular area of government, violating the separation of powers, a concern that Roosevelt himself acknowledged. To provide constitutional safeguards, the APA creates a framework for regulating agencies and their roles. According to the Attorney General's Manual on the Administrative Procedure Act, drafted after the 1946 enactment of the APA, the basic purposes of the APA are the following:

1. to require agencies to keep the public informed of their organization, procedures and rules;
2. to provide for public participation in the rulemaking process, for instance through public commenting;
3. to establish uniform standards for the conduct of formal rulemaking and adjudication;
4. to define the scope of judicial review.

The APA's provisions apply to many federal governmental institutions and agencies. The APA in 5 U.S.C. 551(1) defines an "agency" as "each authority of the Government of the United States, whether or not it is within or subject to review by another agency", with the exception of several enumerated authorities, including Congress, federal courts, and governments of territories or possessions of the United States. Courts have also held that the U.S. president is not an agency under the APA. The APA's capacity to hold accountable regulatory business monitors that oversee civil matters that apply "'soft' administrative law" is also limited. The Supreme Court held that APA lawsuits seeking to enforce a contractual obligation to pay money must be brought in the Court of Federal Claims, not federal district courts.

The Final Report organized federal administrative action into two parts: adjudication and rulemaking. Agency adjudication was broken down further into two distinct phases of formal and informal adjudication. Formal adjudication involve a trial-like hearing with witness testimony, a written record, and a final decision. Under informal adjudication, agency decisions are made without these formal procedures, instead using "inspections, conferences and negotiations". Because formal adjudication produces a record of proceedings and a final decision, it may be subject to judicial review. As for rulemaking resulting in agency rules and regulations, the Final Report noted that many agencies provided due process through hearings and investigations, but there was still a need for well-defined uniform standards for agency adjudication and rulemaking procedures.

== Standard of judicial review ==
The APA requires that to set aside agency actions that are not subject to formal trial-like procedures (i.e. rulemaking), the court must conclude that the regulation is "arbitrary and capricious, an abuse of discretion, or otherwise not in accordance with the law". However, Congress may further limit the scope of judicial review of agency actions by including such language in the authorizing statute. To set aside formal rulemaking or formal adjudication for which procedures are trial-like, a different standard of review allows courts to question agency actions more strongly. For such more formal actions, agency decisions must be supported by "substantial evidence" after the court reads the "whole record", which can be thousands of pages long.

Unlike arbitrary and capricious review, substantial evidence review gives the courts leeway to consider whether an agency's factual and policy determinations were warranted in light of all the information before the agency at the time of decision. Accordingly, arbitrary and capricious review is understood to be more deferential to agencies than substantial evidence review is. Arbitrary and capricious review allows agency decisions to stand as long as an agency can give a reasonable explanation for its decision based on the information that it had at the time.

== Influence by the president ==
By virtue of their constitutional role, U.S. presidents can try to influence specific regulatory proposals before their finalization. Within the Executive Office of the President is the Office of Information and Regulatory Affairs (OIRA), a federal subagency led by a presidential appointee that is widely viewed as working on the president's behalf during the regulatory review process.

== Publication of regulations ==
Rules and regulations issued or proposed (see Notice of Proposed Rulemaking) by federal administrative agencies are published chronologically in the Federal Register. Promulgated rules and regulations are then organized by topic in a separate publication called the Code of Federal Regulations.

== See also ==
- Administrative Law Review
- California Administrative Procedure Act of 1945
- Constitutional law
- Negotiated rulemaking
- Notice of proposed rulemaking
- Regulatory Flexibility Act
