= Vermont Yankee Nuclear Power Corp. v. Natural Resources Defense Council, Inc. =

Vermont Yankee Nuclear Power Corp. v. NRDC
- Supreme Court of the United States

Argued November 28, 1977 Decided April 3, 1978
- Full case name: Vermont Yankee Nuclear Power Corp. v. Natural Resources Defense Council, Inc.
- Citations: 435 U.S. 519 (more) 98 S. Ct. 1197; 55 L. Ed. 2d 460; 1978 U.S. LEXIS 21

Case history
- Prior: Natural Res. Def. Council, Inc. v. U.S. Nuclear Regulatory Comm'n, 547 F.2d 633 (D.C. Cir. 1976); cert. granted, 429 U.S. 1090 (1977).

Holding
- While federal agencies are free to grant additional procedural rights in the exercise of their discretion, reviewing courts are generally not free to impose them if the agencies have not chosen to grant them.

Court membership
- Chief Justice Warren E. Burger Associate Justices William J. Brennan Jr. · Potter Stewart; Byron White · Thurgood Marshall; Harry Blackmun · Lewis F. Powell Jr. William Rehnquist · John P. Stevens

Case opinion
- Majority: Rehnquist, joined by unanimous
- Blackmun, Powell took no part in the consideration or decision of the case.

Laws applied
- Administrative Procedure Act

Vermont Yankee Nuclear Power Corp. v. Natural Resources Defense Council, 435 U.S. 519 (1978), is a case in which the United States Supreme Court held that a court cannot impose rulemaking procedures on a federal government agency. The federal Administrative Procedure Act of 1946 and an agency's statutory mandate from Congress establish the maximum requirements for an agency's rulemaking (and adjudicative) process. An agency may grant additional procedural rights in the regulatory process (within constitutional and statutory limits). However, a reviewing court cannot "impose upon the agency its own notion of which procedures are 'best' or most likely to further some vague, undefined public good"; to do so would exceed the limits of judicial review of agency action.

== Background ==
Throughout the 1960s and 1970s, the United States Court of Appeals for the District of Columbia Circuit became the preeminent administrative law court in the United States. This was in large part due to the creation of new federal statutes such as the Clean Air Act that designated the D.C. Circuit as the center for challenges of regulations issued under said statutes. The D.C. Circuit subsequently expanded administrative law jurisprudence significantly, particularly jurisprudence on informal rulemaking that enhanced judicial review of agency procedures. Underlying most of this jurisprudence was a distrust of federal agencies that came to fruition during this time due to concerns about agency capture.

== Aftermath ==
In its decision, the Supreme Court "could not have made plainer its view that the D.C. Circuit had overstepped its proper role and illegitimately used its judicial review function to advance its judges' own policy preferences." While the holding in Vermont Yankee was "certainly broad enough to suggest that courts should stick to the original understanding of the APA with respect to [the APA's requirements that agencies issue a notice of proposed rulemaking and a statement of basis and purpose]," courts have not applied it in that way.

The case was remanded for the circuit court to determine whether the Table S-3 rule was adequately supported by the administrative record. After the Nuclear Regulatory Commission revised the rule, the Natural Resources Defense Council filed for judicial review of the new regulation. That led to a second Supreme Court case, Baltimore Gas & Elec. Co. v. Natural Resources Defense Council, Inc..

Vermont Yankee signaled a change in administrative law jurisprudence towards legal formalism and textualism. Despite the signaled change, the DC Circuit continued to read additional requirements into the APA for other steps in the rulemaking process. Professor Kenneth Davis wrote that "the Vermont Yankee opinion is largely one of those rare opinions in which the unanimous Supreme Court speaks with little or no authority."

== See also ==
- List of United States Supreme Court cases, volume 435
- Vermont Yankee Nuclear Power Plant
