= Regulatory Flexibility Act =

1980 act of the U.S. Congress

- Long title: An Act to amend title 5, United States Code, to improve federal rulemaking by creating procedures to analyze the availability of more flexible regulatory approaches for small entities, and for other purposes
- Acronyms (colloquial): RFA / "the Reg Flex Act"
- Enacted by: the 96th United States Congress
- Effective: September 19, 1980

Citations
- Public law: 96-354
- Statutes at Large: 94 Stat. 1164

Codification
- Acts amended: Administrative Procedure Act
- Titles amended: 5 U.S.C.: Government Organization and Employees
- U.S.C. sections created: 5 U.S.C. ch. 6 § 601 et seq.

Legislative history
- Introduced in the U.S. Senate as S. 299 by John Culver (D–IA) on January 31, 1979; Committee consideration by Committees on the Judiciary of the U.S. House and Senate; Committees on Small Business of both Houses; Passed the House Small Business Committee on 17 July 1979 (39-0); Passed the Senate Judiciary Committee on 7 May 1980 (unanimous voice vote); Reported by the joint conference committee on 9 September 1980 (Senate bill passed in lieu of House bill); agreed to by the U.S. Senate on 6 August 1980 and 9 September 1980 (unanimous voice votes) and by the U.S. House of Representatives on 9 September 1980 (unanimous voice vote, suspension of the rules); Signed into law by President Jimmy Carter on September 19, 1980

Major amendments
- Small Business Regulatory Enforcement Fairness Act (SBREFA), P.L. 104-121, 1996

The Regulatory Flexibility Act (RFA) is a comprehensive effort by the US federal government to balance the social goals of federal regulations with the needs and capabilities of small businesses and other small entities in American society. In practice, the RFA attempts to "scale" the actions of the federal government to the size of the groups and organizations affected.

Passed in 1980, the RFA has been gradually strengthened in the intervening years, and has historically enjoyed strong bipartisan support.

Since the federal government began calculating the economic impact of the RFA in 1998, the law is estimated to have saved small entities (and the US economy as a whole) more than $200 billion without undermining the broad purposes of the regulations it affects. More than 40 US states, as well as a number of other nations, have adopted similar approaches.

== History ==
The origins of the RFA can be traced back to expressions of discontent about federal regulations by businesses from the 1930s onward, but the urgency of these concerns increased sharply as new federal agencies were created, and older ones given fresh mandates to pursue, in the 1960s and 1970s.

Studies of the economic role of smaller businesses in the 1970s showed links to the growth of overall employment and technological innovation.

These factors, together with the increasing political assertiveness of U.S. small businesses, provided impetus for a series of laws enacted from 1976 to 1984 including the RFA, the Paperwork Reduction Act, the Small Business Development Center Act, the Equal Access to Justice Act (EAJA), the Small Business Innovation Research Act (SBIR), and the Competition in Contracting Act (CICA).

The first in this line of laws was enacted in June 1976, when President Gerald Ford signed Public Law 94-305 creating an Office of Advocacy within the U.S. Small Business Administration (SBA), and giving that Office responsibility for assessing the impact of federal regulations on small firms. The law called on the Office of Advocacy to "measure the direct costs and other effects of government regulation on small businesses; and make legislative and nonlegislative proposals for eliminating excessive or unnecessary regulations of small businesses."

This was a significant recognition of the issue of scale in federal regulations, but its remedies—measuring effects and offering proposals—were incomplete.

On August 1, 1977, Senators Gaylord Nelson (D, WI) and John Culver (D, IA) introduced the earliest version of the Regulatory Flexibility Act in Congress. Their bill directed federal agencies to actually seek less burdensome regulations for small businesses, and assigned responsibility to the new Office of Advocacy to monitor compliance.

Following several hearings, the bill was revised in a number of ways, notably by including small nonprofit organizations and small governmental bodies within its jurisdiction. The legislation attracted more than 70 of the Senate's 100 members as co-sponsors, and passed the U.S. Senate unanimously in October 1978, although it was not acted upon by the U.S. House of Representatives until a new Congress convened in 1979.

Like later versions of the RFA, the 1977-8 legislation targeted the basic law governing the conduct of all federal agencies, called the Administrative Procedure Act. The RFA amended this statute by designating a new responsibility for federal agencies. Henceforth agencies would be required to assess the impact of their regulations on small entities (small businesses, small nonprofit organizations and small governmental jurisdictions) as a key part of the process for issuing regulations, and to use less burdensome alternatives whenever possible.

One of the creative aspects of the RFA was the method that it required the agencies to use.

Both Senators Nelson and Culver were noted environmentalists, so they adapted an approach used earlier in the National Environmental Policy Act. Agencies were to develop an "initial" analysis of the effects of a proposed regulation on small entities (similar to a preliminary environmental impact analysis), seek comments, and then refine these inputs into a "final" small entity impact analysis (similar to a final environmental impact analysis).

In the fall of 1979, as the Regulatory Flexibility Act moved forward in Congress, President Jimmy Carter took steps to advance some of the goals of the legislation administratively. He added the Small Business Administration to his Regulatory Council and issued a memorandum to the heads of executive departments and agencies, directing them "...to make sure that federal regulations will not place unnecessary burdens on small businesses and organizations," and to apply regulations "in a flexible manner, taking into account the size and nature of the regulated businesses." Agencies were to report on their efforts to the Office of Advocacy.

Meanwhile, the House and Senate Small Business and Judiciary Committees continued to hold hearings on the effects of regulation. Small business representatives cited evidence that uniform application of regulatory requirements made it difficult for smaller businesses to enter into various lines of business and to compete.

In January 1980, small business leaders elected by their peers assembled as delegates to the first modern White House Conference on Small Business. The final conference report noted that "during the past decade, the growth of government regulation has been explosive, particularly in such areas as affirmative-action hiring, energy conservation, and protection for consumers, workers, and the environment. Small business people recognize that some government regulation is essential for maintaining an orderly society. But there are now 90 agencies issuing thousands of new rules each year."

Moreover, the report said, the new Office of Advocacy had estimated that small firms spent $12.7 billion annually on government paperwork. Among the conference recommendations, a top vote-getter was a recommendation calling for "sunset review" and economic impact analysis of regulations, as well as a regulatory review board with small business representation. The conference delegates recommended putting the onus of measuring regulatory costs on the regulatory agencies—to "require all federal agencies to analyze the cost and relevance of regulations to small businesses."

== Requirements of the Act ==
The White House Conference recommendations lent significant impetus for the passage, in September 1980, of the Regulatory Flexibility Act (RFA). The intent of the act is stated in the notes for the act:

It is the purpose of this Act to establish as a principle of regulatory issuance that agencies shall endeavor, consistent with the objectives of the rule and of applicable statutes, to fit regulatory and informational requirements to the scale of the businesses, organizations, and governmental jurisdictions subject to regulation. To achieve this principle, agencies are required to solicit and consider flexible regulatory proposals and to explain the rationale for their actions to assure that such proposals are given serious consideration.

The Regulatory Flexibility Act was originally passed in 1980 (P.L. 96-354). The act was amended by the Small Business Regulatory Enforcement Fairness Act of 1996 (P.L. 104-121), the Dodd-Frank Wall Street Reform and Consumer Protection Act (P.L. 111-203), and the Small Business Jobs Act of 2010 (P.L. 111-240).

The key requirement of the law is that federal agencies must analyze the impact of their regulatory actions on small entities (small businesses, small non-profit organizations and small jurisdictions of government) and, where the regulatory impact is likely to be "significant", affecting a "substantial number" of these small entities, seek less burdensome alternatives for them. Both current and proposed federal regulations are subject to the RFA.

The process for seeking these less burdensome alternatives is three-fold. Agencies must:

- Solicit views of affected small entities
- Consider the views of the SBA Office of Advocacy
- Publish an initial regulatory flexibility analysis (IRFA) and/or a final regulatory flexibility analysis (FRFA) in the Federal Register, or provide a certification that the regulation will have no "significant impact"

The RFA has added important elements of management oversight, predictability and transparency to the federal regulatory process. This is particularly evident in the government-wide semi-annual regulatory agendas that the RFA requires.

These documents, now known as "unified agendas", note all planned federal regulations. Those regulations expected to "significantly" impact small entities, thereby triggering special analyses under the RFA, are separately indexed, as are those that may affect small entities, but not "significantly." The unified agendas also single out anticipated regulations covered by other statutes and executive orders.

One of the more ambitious aspects of the RFA is its requirement that federal agencies review all of their existing regulations over a period of ten years and revise those that are duplicative, excessively burdensome, or no longer necessary. Although this RFA provision (Section 610 of the Act) is often ignored by agencies, a plan for this review of existing regulations is likewise published with the unified agendas.

The RFA does not compel specific regulatory outcomes. Agencies are required to assess the impacts of their proposed and final rules on small entities, and to select less burdensome alternatives—or explain why they cannot do so. But they are not required to alter their agency missions or their legal mandates. Like the Administrative Procedure Act that it amends, the RFA primarily defines the required procedural steps in a process. While agency non-compliance with these required steps can (and has) led to suspensions of various regulations by the courts, it is the failure to faithfully observe the process, not the subject matter of the regulations, that has led to these outcomes.

The RFA comprises Chapter 6 of Title 5 of the United States Code.

== Implementation ==
The RFA tasked SBA's Office of Advocacy with monitoring agency compliance with the new law. Over the next decade and a half, the Office carried out its mandate, reporting annually on agency compliance to the President and the Congress.

Those reports soon made it clear that the law wasn't strong enough. A briefing paper prepared for the 1986 White House Conference on Small Business noted: "The effectiveness of the Regulatory Flexibility Act largely depends on small business' awareness of proposed regulations and [their] ability to effectively voice [their] concerns to regulatory agencies. In addition, the courts' ability to review agency compliance with the law is limited."

The delegates to the 1986 conference recommended that the RFA be strengthened by requiring agencies to comply and by providing that agency action or inaction be subject to judicial review. President Ronald Reagan's 1987 report on small business noted: "Regulations and excessive paperwork place small businesses at a disadvantage in an increasingly competitive world marketplace ... This Administration supports continued deregulation and other reforms to eliminate regulatory obstacles to open competition." But it would take an act of Congress to make judicial review law—and reaching that consensus needed more time.

Regulations' effects on the economic environment for competition also concerned President George H. W. Bush, whose 1992 message in the annual small business report noted: "My Administration this year instituted a moratorium on new federal regulations to give federal agencies a chance to review and revise their rules. And we are looking at ways to improve our regulatory process over the long term so that regulations will accomplish their original purpose without hindering economic growth."

In early September 1993, Vice President Al Gore's National Partnership for Reinventing Government also urged that the Regulatory Flexibility Act be strengthened by permitting judicial review of agency compliance.

A few weeks later, President Bill Clinton issued Executive Order 12866, "Regulatory Planning and Review", designed, among other things, to ease the regulatory burden on small firms.

The order required federal agencies to analyze their major regulatory undertakings and to take action to ensure that these regulations achieved the desired results with minimal burden on the U.S. economy.

An April 1994 report by the Government Accountability Office reviewed the Office of Advocacy's annual reports on agency compliance with the RFA and concluded: "The SBA annual reports indicated agencies' compliance with the RFA has varied widely from one agency to another. ... the RFA does not authorize SBA or any other agency to compel rulemaking agencies to comply with the act's provisions."

== The 1995 White House Conference and SBREFA ==
In June 1995, a third White House Conference on Small Business examined the RFA's weaknesses. Despite the Clinton Administration's support for strengthening the law, as exemplified in the Vice President's recommendation in the National Performance Review, the key element for doing so—judicial review of agency compliance—remained missing.

Once again, a White House Conference forcefully addressed the problem. One of its recommendations fine-tuned the regulatory policy recommendations of earlier conferences, asking for specific provisions that would include small firms in the rulemaking process.

In October, the Office of Advocacy issued a report, based on research by Thomas Hopkins, that estimated the total costs of process, environmental, and other social and economic regulations to be between $420 billion and $670 billion in 1995. The report estimated that the average cost of regulation was $2,979 per employee for large firms with 500 or more employees and $5,532 per employee for small firms with fewer than 20 employees. (A successor study by Mark Crain, in 2005, documented a similar pattern.)

In March 1996, President Clinton acted on the 1995 White House Conference recommendation that was taken up by Congress, by signing Public Law 104-121, the Small Business Regulatory Enforcement Fairness Act (SBREFA). The new law finally strengthened the RFA in the way that previous reports and conferences had recommended. Perhaps most significantly, it gave the courts jurisdiction to review agency compliance with the RFA.

SBREFA also mandated that the United States Environmental Protection Agency (EPA) and the Occupational Safety and Health Administration (OSHA) convene small business advocacy review panels to consult with small entities on regulations expected to have a significant impact on them, before the regulations were published for public comment.

Also, the law reaffirmed the authority of the chief counsel for advocacy to file amicus curiae (friend of the court) briefs in appeals brought by small entities from agency final actions.

Since 1998, the Office of Advocacy's Annual Reports on RFA Implementation have calculated regulatory cost savings attributable to the RFA. Through FY 2007, these savings have totaled over $200 billion, of which $156 billion are recurring savings each year.

== Executive Order 13272 ==
In August 2002, President George W. Bush issued Executive Order 13272, further implementing the RFA. The Executive Order requires federal agencies to establish written procedures and policies explaining how they measure the impact of their regulatory proposals on small entities and to vet those policies with the Office of Advocacy; to notify the Office of Advocacy before publishing draft rules expected to have a significant small business impact; and to consider the Office of Advocacy's written comments on proposed rules and publish a response with the final rule. E.O. 13272 also requires the Office of Advocacy to provide notification as well as training to all agencies on how to comply with the RFA. These additional requirements permit the Office of Advocacy to work closely with federal agencies in considering the impacts of proposed regulations on small entities.

=== Implementation ===
To comply with E.O. 13272, the Office of Advocacy began providing reports to the Office of Management and Budget in September 2003. The Office also instituted an email address (notify.advocacy@sba.gov) for agencies to rapidly transmit their notifications about regulations, and published an RFA compliance guide for agencies. Subsequently, the Office of Advocacy prepared agency training materials, and began training agency personnel throughout the government.

Nearly all of the cabinet agencies complied with the E.O. by submitting written plans for compliance to the Office of Advocacy and by making their RFA procedures publicly available. Advocacy, in turn, developed a Regulatory Alerts webpage at http://www.sba.gov/advo/laws/law_regalerts.html to call attention to important pending regulations that may affect small entities.

Legislation has been introduced to further enhance the RFA. As agencies adjust their regulatory development processes to accommodate the RFA and E.O. 13272's requirements, the benefits will accrue to small entities. Agencies are making strides in that direction.

Since the RFA became law, more than forty state governments have enacted similar requirements through statutes and executive orders. Both the SBA Office of Advocacy and the American Legislative Exchange Council (ALEC), an association of state and federal legislators, have drafted "model" state laws paralleling the RFA.

== International regulatory flexibility initiatives ==
Other nations have drawn upon, and in some cases more fully developed, various elements of the RFA:

Multilateral efforts. In 2000, both the European Union (EU) and the Organization for Economic Cooperation and Development (OECD) adopted broad policy statements in support of small and mid-sized enterprises (SMEs) which included provisions on the regulatory treatment of SMEs. This subject is also being discussed within the Asia Pacific Economic Cooperation (APEC) group and the Association of South East Asian Nations (ASEAN). The World Bank has contributed significantly to the global dialogue on SME regulatory burdens through its annual "Doing Business" surveys.

EU. The EU's Charter to Support Europe's Small Firms called for "better legislation and regulation – assessing regulation for its impact on small firms, and where possible simplifying or removing altogether obligations on SMEs".

In 2003, the EU created a "European Business Test Panel" to react to the potential impact of legislative and regulatory initiatives, followed, in 2007, by an Action Programme for Reducing Administrative Burdens in the European Union, which includes a series of specific tests of those burdens on SMEs.

These initiatives were strengthened in the EU's Small Business Act in 2008, which articulates the principle of "Think Small First". The EU's "Small Business Envoy", similar to the Office of Advocacy in the U.S., is tasked with monitoring the execution of the "Think Small First" principle. A 2009 report on the "Think Small First" implementation emphasized the potentially disproportionate burden of EU regulations on Europe's SMEs.

OECD. On behalf of 46 nations that participated in its drafting, the OECD's Bologna Charter on SME Policies called for a regulatory environment that "...does not impose undue burdens on SMEs and is conducive to entrepreneurship, innovation and growth," and agreed on "benchmarking the effectiveness of SME policies, regulatory environment and performance, based on data and statistics collected at national and sub-national level, including on electronic commerce."

The OECD also has undertaken studies of regulatory reforms affecting SMEs in several nations. For example, the Netherlands study, by Scott Jacobs, draws attention to the Dutch Ondernemershuizen, one-stop shops where SMEs can articulate their regulatory concerns and obtain problem-solving, and to the panel of 30 entrepreneurs who meet regularly with the Dutch State Secretary to identify further areas for reform. (A 2007 analysis by the World Bank concluded that "Dutch regulatory reform is a world leader.")

Both the EU and the OECD have encouraged their member nations to adopt the International Standard Cost Model to facilitate international comparisons of administrative burdens on business. Some 27 nations now belong to an ISCM information-sharing network.

APEC/ASEAN. An APEC / ASEAN policy document identifies Australia, Mexico, Singapore, Japan, and Taiwan as the groups' leaders in SME regulatory reform, and sets forth a framework for further progress in the region through 2014.

National actions. Individual nations actively pursuing "regulatory flexibility" type SME policies include:

- Canada
- Denmark
- Estonia
- Hungary
- Ireland
- Luxembourg
- New Zealand
- Singapore
- South Africa
- Sweden
- United Kingdom

The World Bank's annual assessment and ranking of regulatory burdens in 183 countries has highlighted the linkage between reduced SME regulatory burdens and economic development, particularly in emerging markets. Efforts by nations to improve their ranking on this annual survey have resulted in significant reforms.

Given this growing support for the flexible regulatory treatment of smaller enterprises by both transnational organizations and individual nations, and perhaps international competitiveness considerations, it seems likely that such approaches will spread further in coming years.

== Federal case law citations ==
- Aeronautical Repair Station Association, Inc., et al. v. Federal Aviation Administration, 494 F.3rd 161 (D.C. Circuit, 2007)
- American Trucking Associations, Inc. v. U.S. Environmental Protection Agency, 175 F.3d 1027, 336 U.S.App. D.C.16 (D.C. Circuit, 1999)
- Mid-Tex Electric Co-op Inc. v. Federal Energy Regulatory Commission, 249 U.S. App. D.C. 64, 773 F.2d 327(1985)
- Northwest Mining Association v. Babbitt, 5 F.Supp. 2d 9, (D.D.C. 1998)
- Southern Offshore Fishing Association v. Daley, 55 F.Supp. 2d 1336 (M.D. Fla. 1999).
- United States Telcom Association v. Federal Communications Commission, 400 F.3d 29 (D.C. Circuit, 2005)
- and see generally Regulatory Flexibility Act Shepardizing: Case Law
