= Plain Writing Act of 2010 =

U.S. writing law

- Long title: An act to enhance citizen access to Government information and services by establishing that Government documents issued to the public must be written clearly, and for other purposes.
- Enacted by: the 111th United States Congress
- Effective: October 13, 2010

Citations
- Public law: 111-274
- Statutes at Large: 124 Stat. 2861

Codification
- U.S.C. sections amended: 5 USC 301 note

Legislative history
- Introduced in the House as H.R. 946 by Bruce Braley (D–IA) on February 10, 2009; Committee consideration by House Oversight and Government Reform; Passed the House on March 17, 2010 (386–33); Passed the Senate on September 27, 2010 (unanimous consent) with amendment; House agreed to Senate amendment on September 29, 2010 (341–82); Signed into law by President Barack Obama on October 13, 2010

On June 1, 1998, President Bill Clinton issued a Memorandum on Plain Language in Government Writing. (PDF) The rationale for this memorandum was to "make the Government more responsive, accessible, and understandable in its communications with the public" and its goal is to save the Government and the private sector "time, effort and money." Accompanying guidance was issued at the time the memorandum entered the record.

Signed into law on October 13, 2010, by President Obama, the Plain Writing Act of 2010 (H.R. 946; Pub. L. 111–274 (text) (PDF)) is a United States federal law that requires that federal executive agencies:

- Use plain writing in every covered document that the agency issues or substantially revises
- Train employees in "plain writing" practices
- Establish a process for overseeing the agency's compliance with this Act
- Create and maintain a plain writing section on the agency's website to inform the public of agency compliance with the requirements of this Act
- Provide a mechanism for the agency to receive and respond to public input on agency implementation and agency reports required under this Act, and be accessible from its homepage
- Designate one or more agency points-of-contact to receive and respond to public input on the implementation of this Act

== Example ==
Before:

The amount of expenses reimbursed to a claimant under this subpart shall be reduced by any amount that the claimant receives from a collateral source. In cases in which a claimant receives reimbursement under this subpart for expenses that also will or may be reimbursed from another source, the claimant shall subrogate the United States to the claim for payment from the collateral source up to the amount for which the claimant was reimbursed under this subpart.

After:

If you get a payment from a collateral source, we will reduce our payment by the amount you get. If you get payments from us and from a collateral source for the same expenses, you must pay us back the amount we paid you.

== See also ==
- Paperwork Reduction Act
