= Office of Advocacy =

Office within the U.S. Small Business Administration

Office of Advocacy, U.S. Small Business Administration
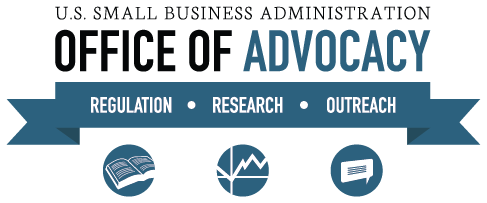

Agency overview
- Formed: June 4, 1976
- Headquarters: 409 Third Street, SW, Washington, D.C.
- Agency executive: Casey B. Mulligan, Chief Counsel for Advocacy
- Website: advocacy.sba.gov

The Office of Advocacy of the U.S. Small Business Administration represents the views of small business to Congress, the White House, federal agencies, federal courts, and state policymakers. It is an independent federal government office housed within the Small Business Administration and created by act of Congress in 1976. It is led by a Chief Counsel for Advocacy who is nominated by the president and confirmed by the U.S. Senate. Its functions include representing the views of small entities in federal rulemaking, conducting economic research on small businesses issues and trends, and gathering information from small entities nationwide.
