= Executive Order 12866 =

Presidential directive mandating the use of cost-benefit analysis by Federal agencies

Executive Order 12866 in the United States, issued by President Clinton in 1993, requires a cost–benefit analysis for any new regulation that is "economically significant", which is defined as having "an annual effect on the economy of $100 million or more or adversely affect[ing] in a material way the economy, a sector of the economy, productivity, competition, [or] jobs," or creating an inconsistency with other law, or any of several other conditions. The Order established a "regulatory philosophy" and several "principles for regulation", among them requirements to explicitly identify the problem to be addressed, determine whether existing regulations created or contributed to the problem, assess alternatives to direct regulation, and design regulations in the most cost-effective manner possible. Section § 1(a) summarizes this regulatory philosophy as follows:

Federal agencies should promulgate only such regulations as are required by law, are necessary to interpret the law, or are made necessary by compelling public need, such as material failures of private markets to protect or improve the health and safety of the public, the environment, or the well-being of the American people.

Agencies were directed to fulfill these requirements though economic analysis, most notably the preparation of Regulatory Impact Analyses (RIAs). Regulations within this definition are colloquially termed "economically significant".

== Executive Order 12866 ==
=== Scope ===
Though the term effect is crucial for determining the likelihood that a rule is economically significant, the term was not internally defined. Rather, all interpretative determinations critical to implementation were delegated to the Office of Information and Regulatory Affairs (OIRA) within the Office of Management and Budget (OMB).

=== Procedure ===
Executive Order 12866 provides for a centralized review conducted on behalf of the President by OIRA (the same agency directed by Congress to implement the Paperwork Reduction Act). This alignment of executive and statutory functions enhances the efficiency of Executive Office oversight because virtually every rule contains information collection requirements.

Under Executive Order 12866, the procedure for determining whether a draft rule is significant (and thus subject to OIRA review) or economically significant (and thus subject to the requirement to prepare a Regulatory Impact Analysis) begins with agencies preparing entries to the semi-annual Unified Regulatory Agenda, which OIRA reviews before publication in the Federal Register, along with each agency's Regulatory Plan. Agencies are required to engage in prior consultation with both private and public stakeholders before drafting notices of proposed rulemaking, and ensuring that they have at least 60 days for public comment.

Agencies are required to provide to OIRA comprehensive lists of planned regulatory actions, including agencies' provisional determinations of whether each action is significant. Drafts of significant regulatory actions must be transmitted to OIRA for review, along with assessments of their potential costs and benefits. For economically significant regulatory actions, agencies also must provide OIRA with a Regulatory Impact Analysis. After OIRA review is completed and each draft proposed or final rule is published in the Federal Register, agencies are required to make all analyses public and "[i]dentify for the public, in a complete, clear, and simple manner, the substantive changes between the draft submitted to OIRA for review and the action subsequently announced; and ... those changes in the regulatory action that were made at the suggestion or recommendation of OIRA."

OIRA may return a draft rule to an agency "for further consideration of some or all of its provisions," accompanying any return with "a written explanation ... setting forth the pertinent provision of [Executive Order 12866] on which OIRA is relying."

The reach of Executive Order 12286 was extended in 2011 to require agencies to conduct retrospective reviews of existing regulations.

=== Regulatory Impact Analyses under Circular A-4 ===
Regulatory Impact Analyses are governed by guidance issued by OMB, OMB Circular A-4. Circular A-4 requires agencies to clearly identify why regulation is needed, consider a reasonable number of alternative regulatory approaches, and for each alternative conduct a rigorous and objective benefit-cost analysis. OIRA reviews RIAs for transparency, utility, and objectivity.

=== Judicial review ===
Executive Order 12866 concludes with the statement

This Executive order is intended only to improve the internal management of the Federal Government and does not create any right or benefit, substantive or procedural, enforceable at law or equity by a party against the United States, its agencies or instrumentalities, its officers or employees, or any other person.

Enforcement of the Order occurs during a public comment period after the agency receives public comments, and before the agency publishes a final rule. Notices of Executive Order reviews are not published—an interested member of the public has to watch OMB's web site daily to see when the agency submits a rule for review. OMB receives comments and will conduct meetings (with agency representatives present) to conduct reviews. These are not entirely satisfactory, since the final rule remains unpublished, and members of the public can only comment on the rule as proposed in an NPRM. Nonetheless, OMB does block or require further changes to a handful of rules every year.

== History ==
=== Origin of benefit-cost analysis: President Ford's Executive Order 11821 and the Council on Wage and Price Stability ===
President Gerald Ford's organized, comprehensive effort at regulatory reform, and to address inflationary impact of federal government activities and regulation, began with establishment of the Council on Wage and Price Stability (CWPS) in August 1974. The council was charged with monitoring the private sector economy, and reviewing government programs to determine their impact on inflation. In November 1974, President Ford issued Executive Order 11821, which established procedures for preparing Inflation Impact Statements, that required agencies to evaluate economic impact of regulatory proposals, specifically their effects on productivity and competition, and to submit those statements to CWPS for review.

=== President Reagan's Executive Order 12291 ===
Executive Order 12291 required OIRA review for regulations that "may [h]ave an annual effect on the economy of $100 million or more or adversely affect in a material way the economy, a sector of the economy, productivity, competition, jobs, the environment, public health or safety, or State, local, or tribal governments or communities."

=== Replacement by President Clinton: Executive Order 12866 ===
Executive Order 12866 (October 1993) replaced Executive Orders 12291 and 12498.

The key procedural difference between today's Executive Order 12866 and the 1980s-era Executive Order 12291 is that, under Executive Order 12291, OIRA formally reviewed all draft proposed and final rules before signature by the relevant agency official and transmission to the Federal Register for publication, whereas under Executive Order 12866, OIRA formally reviews only those draft rules covered by § 3(f) ("significant regulatory action"). This distinction is significant, for during the 12.5 years in which Executive Order 12291 was in place, OIRA reviewed an average of 2,382 draft rules per year, but during the 24 years that Executive Order 12866 has been in force, OIRA has reviewed only 596 draft rules per year. This 75% reduction in the scope of OIRA review undoubtedly enabled more focused attention, but it did so at the expense of incentivizing agencies to evade OIRA review by misclassifying draft rules below the threshold set in § 3(f).

=== Revisions by President George W. Bush -- Executive Orders 13258 and 13422 ===
President George W. Bush amended Executive Order 12866 in Executive Orders 13258 and 13422. Executive Order 13272 is related, requiring consideration of small entities.

=== Revisions by President Obama -- Executive Order 13563 ===
Ten days after entering office, President Obama issued Executive Order 13497, which revoked President Bush's Executive Orders 13258 and 13422.

In 2002, Cass Sunstein, who would later serve as President Obama's Administrator of the Office of Information and Regulatory Affairs, co-authored an article on a proposed replacement.

Executive Order 13563, Improving Regulation and Regulatory Review, was issued by President Barack Obama in 2011. It reaffirms and amplifies the principles embodied in E.O. 12866 by encouraging agencies to coordinate their regulatory activities, and to consider regulatory approaches that reduce the burden of regulation while maintaining flexibility and freedom of choice for the public. It directs agencies to, where feasible and appropriate, seek the views of those likely to be affected by a proposed rulemaking before a notice of proposed rulemaking is issued. E.O 13563 requires agencies to quantify anticipated benefits and costs of proposed rulemakings as accurately as possible using the best available techniques, and to ensure that any scientific and technological information or processes used to support their regulatory actions are objective.

To the extent feasible and permitted by law, E.O. 13563 also directs agencies to provide timely online access to the rulemaking docket for proposed and final rules, along with any relevant scientific and technical findings, on regulations.gov, and to afford the public the opportunity to comment on proposed regulations through the Internet. With regard to existing regulations, E.O. 13563 instructs agencies to periodically review their significant regulations with the goal of making their regulatory programs more effective or less burdensome.

=== Revisions by President Trump (first administration): Executive Orders 13771, 13777, 13891, 13892, and 13893 ===
==== Executive Order 13771 ====
The provisions of Executive Orders 12866 and 13563 were significantly narrowed in some respects and expanded in others by Executive Orders 13771 and 13777. Among the significant narrowing provisions are a more parsimonious description of the stated purposes of regulation. Whereas Executive Order 12866 contained a long list of regulatory principles, in which the maximization of net social benefits is one of many, Executive Order 13771 directs agencies "to be prudent and financially responsible in the expenditure of funds, from both public and private sources" and to "manage the costs associated with the governmental imposition of private expenditures required to comply with Federal regulations".

Executive Order 13771 expands upon Executive Order 12866 in both substantive and procedural ways. Substantively, Executive Order 13771 directs agencies to eliminate at least two existing regulations for every new regulation issued and abide by regulatory budget caps set by OMB. Substantively, Executive Order 13771 restores and greatly expands the authority OMB had under Executive Order 12291 as the final arbiter of benefits and costs and authorizes OMB to set regulatory cost caps. The Order also generally prohibits agencies from proposing or promulgating regulations not previously published in the Unified Regulatory Agenda. Procedurally, Executive Order 13771 established additional steps agencies must follow, supervised by OMB, including the issuance by OMB of enforceable regulatory budget caps.

OMB issued final implementing guidance after publishing, and seeking public comment on, interim guidance. The final guidance clarifies several key issues. First, the scope of Executive Order 13771 extends to conventional regulatory actions, deregulatory actions, and significant guidance documents. Second, Executive Order 13771 focuses on regulatory cost alone without regard to regulatory benefits.

==== Executive Order 13777 ====
Executive Order 13777 directs federal agencies to establish Regulatory Reform Officers (RROs) to "oversee the implementation of regulatory reform initiatives and policies to ensure that agencies effectively carry out regulatory reforms, consistent with applicable law." RROs are responsible for identifying regulations that, inter alia, "eliminate jobs, or inhibit job creation." "are outdated, unnecessary, or ineffective," "impose costs that exceed benefits," or "create a serious inconsistency or otherwise interfere with regulatory reform initiatives and policies." In addition, existing regulations that rely on information that violates the Information Quality Act are specifically targeted for repeal, replacement, or modification.

Executive Order 13777 specifically directs agencies modify the performance indicators established pursuant to the Government Performance and Results Act of 1993 (GPRA) to reflect Executive Order 13771 goals. OMB implementing guidance expands upon the Order by enumerating specific requirements and expectations for agencies' FY 2018 GPRA annual Performance Reports and FY 2019 annual Performance Plans. This is a key process change. OMB's GPRA existing guidance does not reflect regulatory policy objectives, and the decision to include them is new.

==== Executive Orders 13891 and 13892 ====
On October 9, 2019, the White House issued two executive orders, Executive Order 13891, Promoting the Rule of Law Through Improved Agency Guidance Documents, reprinted at 84 Fed. Reg. 55235 (Oct. 15, 2019), and Executive Order 13892, Promoting the Rule of Law Through Transparency and Fairness in Civil Administrative Enforcement and Adjudication, reprinted at 84 Fed. Reg. 55239 (Oct. 15, 2019). Both Executive Orders are generally directed to requiring federal agencies to "act transparently and fairly with respect to all affected parties ... when engaged in civil administrative enforcement or adjudication." E.O. 13892 goes on to explain that individuals should not be subject to enforcement actions without "prior public notice of both the enforcing agency's jurisdiction over particular conduct and the legal standards applicable to that conduct."

==== Executive Orders 13891 and 13892—in General ====
For the most part, Executive Orders 13891 and 13892 are simple reminders and restatements of long-standing requirements of the Administrative Procedure Act (APA). For example, E.O. 13891 § 1 and E.O. 13892 § 3 remind agencies that they may not enforce "rules" against the public unless those rules are promulgated as "regulations," in full compliance with the APA and similar laws. E.O. 13892 § 3 and § 4 remind agencies that the APA allows agencies to use sub-regulatory guidance documents to "articulate the agency's understanding" of other law, or announce tentative positions, but may not apply those soft-edged understandings as if they were hard-edged enforcement standards, unless the agency has followed certain procedures required by the APA. E.O. 13891 and 13892 each state that agencies have sometimes inappropriately exerted authority, without following statutorily-required procedures.

In addition, Executive Orders 13891 and 13892 go above statute to add a few additional requirements for fairness and transparency. These above-statutory requirements ask agencies to give notice of all their sub-regulatory guidance documents. Covered guidance documents are defined to include anything to which the agency intends to give prospective effect, that is promulgated without the formality of "regulation" (E.O. 13291 § 2(b)). For example, E.O. 13892 requires agencies to "afford regulated parties the safeguards described in this order, above and beyond those that the courts have interpreted the Due Process Clause of the Fifth Amendment to the Constitution to impose" (emphasis added). E.O. 13892 explains that agencies must work to "foster greater private-sector cooperation in enforcement, promote information sharing with the private sector, and establish predictable outcomes for private conduct."

Among the new requirements added by Executive Orders 13891 and 13892 to promote transparency and predictability are the following:

- Each agency must list all its sub-regulatory guidance documents in one consolidated database of its web site, which must be indexed and searchable. The public should be able to rely on two sources, the Federal Register and one web page.
- After the Office of Management and Budget issues further implementing guidance, agencies will have a year to purge guidance documents of invalidly-promulgated requirements. They must either be repromulgated as regulation with full cost-benefit analysis, or else dropped.
- The orders set additional procedures to promulgate, and provide ongoing periodic review, of various sub-regulatory guidance documents.

The Orders then return to statutory underpinnings, and require agencies to apply them in a consistent and predictable fashion.

==== "Unfair surprise" ====
"When an agency takes an administrative enforcement action, engages in adjudication, or otherwise makes a determination that has legal consequence for a person, it may apply only standards of conduct that have been publicly stated in a manner that would not cause unfair surprise." E.O. 13892 § 4.

Moreover, the definitions section of E.O. 12892 highlights the breadth of what it means for an Agency's position to be an "unfair surprise", as discussed in Christopher v. SmithKline Beecham Corp., 567 U.S. 142 (2012). In Christopher, the Supreme Court noted that agencies are required to provide fair warning regarding the conduct that a regulation requires or prohibits and cannot rely on principles of judicial interpretation to save an unfairly-vague rule or give it enforceable "teeth" ex post. E.O. 13892 explains that agencies "must avoid unfair surprise not only when it imposes penalties but also whenever it adjudges past conduct to have violated the law." E.O. 13892 appears to be a step in the right direction to help inform practitioners (and others) about the practical implications of otherwise innocuous conduct.

When an agency states a position in sub-regulatory guidance, the law has long recognized that the agency may not stand on that guidance as the last word; rather, the agency must entertain alternative positions. "Interpretive rules do not have the force and effect of law and are not accorded that weight in the adjudicatory process." Perez v. Mortgage Bankers Ass'n., 135 S.Ct. 1199, 1204 (2015). E.O. 13892 § 6 requires the agency to give an aggrieved person an opportunity to be heard to contest an agency guidance position, and give a written decision that articulates a basis for its action.

=== Revisions by President Biden ===
One of President Biden's first executive orders (E.O. 13992) rescinded President Trump's Executive Orders 13771, 13777, 13891, 13892, and 13893. E.O. 13992 also reinstated the Final Bulletin on Agency Good Guidance Practices which had been rescinded by President Trump.
