= Paperwork Reduction Act =

United States federal law

Paperwork Reduction Act of 1980
- Long title: An Act to reduce paperwork and enhance the economy and efficiency of the Government and the private sector by improving Federal information policymaking, and for other purposes.
- Enacted by: the 96th United States Congress
- Effective: December 11, 1980

Citations
- Public law: 96–511
- Statutes at Large: 94 Stat. 2812

Codification
- Titles amended: 44 U.S.C.: Public Printing and Documents
- U.S.C. sections amended: 44 U.S.C. ch. 1 § 101; 44 U.S.C. ch. 35, subch. I § 3501 et seq.

Legislative history
- Introduced in the House as H.R. 6410 by Jack Brooks (D–TX) and Frank Horton (R–NY) on February 5, 1980; Committee consideration by Committee on Government Operations; Passed the House on March 24, 1980 (328-13); Passed the Senate on November 19, 1980 (Unanimous) with amendment; House agreed to Senate amendment on December 1, 1980 (Voice vote); Signed into law by President Jimmy Carter on December 11, 1980

Major amendments
- Paperwork Reduction Act of 1995

United States Supreme Court cases
- Dole v. United Steelworkers of America

The Paperwork Reduction Act of 1980 (Pub. L. No. 96-511, 94 Stat. 2812, codified at 44 U.S.C. §§ 3501–3521) is a United States federal law enacted in 1980 designed to reduce the total amount of paperwork burden the federal government imposes on private businesses and citizens. The Act imposes procedural requirements on agencies that wish to collect information from the public. It also established the Office of Information and Regulatory Affairs (OIRA) within the Office of Management and Budget (OMB), and authorized this new agency to oversee federal agencies' collection of information from the public and to establish information policies. A substantial amendment, the Paperwork Reduction Act of 1995, confirmed that OIRA's authority extended over not only agency orders to provide information to the government, but also agency orders to provide information to the public.

== Historical context ==
The predecessor statute to the Paperwork Reduction Act was the Federal Reports Act of 1942. That statute required agencies to obtain approval of the Bureau of the Budget (a direct predecessor of OMB) before imposing information collection burdens on the public. However, large departments such as the Internal Revenue Service (IRS) and the Government Accountability Office (GAO) were exempted from the requirement, and the statute neglected to include sanctions for agencies' noncompliance. Moreover, OMB chronically understaffed its responsibilities: in 1947, there were 47 personnel reviewing agency requests for the entire government, but by 1973 the number of reviewers had dwindled to 25, and these few reviewers had a number of additional responsibilities. The result of the lack of resources was both weak oversight (only between 1 and 5 percent of applications were rejected) and longer delays. Some agencies refused to submit requests for approval; others sought and received alternative processes, fragmenting the regulatory system and increasing the chance of duplicative and wasteful demands for information.

== Substantive requirements ==
The Act imposes a number of procedural requirements on an agency that wishes to implement a reporting or recordkeeping requirement on the public. For instance, the agency must determine a specific objective met by the collection of information, develop a plan for use of the information, and in some cases test the collection method through a pilot program. The agency must ensure that forms include certain items, for instance: an explanation to its audience of the purposes of the information collection, an estimate of the paperwork burden, and whether response is voluntary. In most cases, agencies are further required to publish notice of a proposed requirement in the Federal Register and allow at least 60 days for public comments on the need for and burden of the requirement.

The Paperwork Reduction Act mandates that all federal government agencies receive approval from OMB—in the form of a "control number"—before promulgating a paper form, website, survey or electronic submission that will impose an information collection burden on the general public. The term "burden" is defined as anything beyond "that necessary to identify the respondent, the date, the respondent's address, and the nature of the instrument." No one may be penalized for refusing an information collection request that does not display a valid control number. Once obtained, approval must be renewed every three years.

The process created by the Paperwork Reduction Act makes OIRA into a centralized clearinghouse for all government forms. Thus, it is able to assess the overall impact of the government bureaucracy on American citizens and businesses. This is done in an annual document called the Information Collection Budget of the United States Government. The 2009 Collection Budget reported that the Federal Government generated 9.71 billion hours of mandatory paperwork burden. The burden in 2016 was 9.78 billion hours.

== Criticism ==
Critics have noted that the delays associated with the Act's procedural requirements have created a perverse incentive for agencies to take action without gathering the necessary information. In other cases, the long timelines force agencies to submit information collection documentation before the details of a program are fully known, including what information it will need to function.

Proposed solutions include raising the threshold for the Act's application from 10 to 1000 persons, delegating approval authority from OIRA to agencies for low-burden collections, and reducing the length of the comment period.

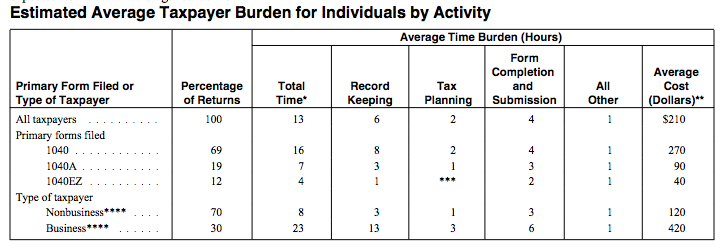
Portion of the Instructions for 2012 IRS Form 1040 (page 103), listing estimated burden imposed in compliance with the Paperwork Reduction Act

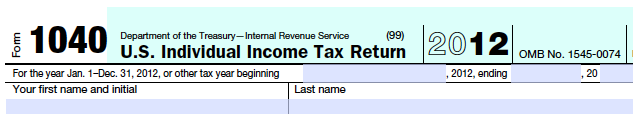
Portion of the IRS Form 1040. The OMB Control Number "1545-0074" can be seen in the upper right corner of the image.

== See also ==
- Plain Writing Act of 2010
