= United States administrative law =

Law governing executive branch agencies

In the United States, the term administrative law is often used to describe the body of statutes (actual laws passed by Congress or a state legislature), as well as the administrative rules, regulations, judicial precedents, and executive orders that, collectively, define the powers and responsibilities held by administrative agencies of the United States government, including executive departments and independent agencies, and agencies operating at state and local level. The field of administrative law also includes the procedures which agencies must observe in rulemaking and adjudication. Because Congress, the president, and the federal courts have limited resources and cannot directly address all issues, specialized powers are often delegated to a board, commission, office, or other agency. These administrative agencies oversee and monitor activities in complex areas, such as commercial aviation, medical device manufacturing, and securities markets. Administrative law is the collective body of statutes, rules, and regulations that sets the procedural foundation for those agency activities.

Former Supreme Court Justice Stephen Breyer has defined the legal rules and principles of administrative law in four parts: (1) define the authority and structure of administrative agencies; (2) specify the procedural formalities employed by agencies; (3) determine the validity of agency decisions; and (4) define the role of reviewing courts and other governmental entities in relation to administrative agencies. Another common taxonomy divides administrative law into three main topics: rulemaking, adjudication, and judicial review.

Statutes (laws passed by Congress or a state legislature) specify the scope of an agency's rulemaking authority, procedures that must be followed to promulgate rules and regulations, and the agency's enforcement authority. As such, many U.S. federal agencies have assumed quasi-legislative authority to create rules and regulations that they enforce as if they were laws.

Many U.S. federal agencies have the power to adjudicate, typically to rule on applications for some benefit or license, or to enforce laws within their specific areas of delegated power. This is discussed further in the section on Adjudication, below.

For many agencies, a statute provides for one or more layers of intra-agency appeal.

Decisions of agencies (either rulemaking or adjudication) may be appealed, sometimes to a specialized "court" or tribunal outside the agency but still within the executive branch (such as the Tax Court, Court of Appeals for Veterans Claims, Merit Systems Protection Board, or Presidential review of an agency decision), sometimes to an Article III Court of specialized subject matter jurisdiction (such as the Court of Federal Claims or United States Court of Appeals for the Federal Circuit), or a court of general subject matter jurisdiction that geographically embraces a high fraction of agency decisions (the United States District Court for the District of Columbia, or United States Court of Appeals for the District of Columbia Circuit).

== Background ==
In 1938, the American Bar Association (ABA) Special Committee on Administrative Law, chaired by Louis G. Caldwell, launched a polemical assault on the rising regulatory apparatus. Caldwell warned that the judicial branch was in danger of meeting the "fate of the Merovingian Kings" if administrative absolutism—combining the judicial, legislative, and executive powers—remained unchecked. Roscoe Pound, who later chaired the committee, identified several hallmarks of administrative abuse including:

1. Decisions without hearings
2. Decisions based on secret evidence
3. Decisions based on policy opinions (lacking impartiality)
4. Blurring the lines between law and fact-finding
5. Execise of broad powers without limiting principles or standards
6. Broad non-specific justifications like "public interest" accepted without legal scrutiny

However, even critics of "administrative absolutism," acknowledged that the volume of cases handled by administrative agencies far exceeded the capacity of the courts. Louis Jaffe later described Pound's 1938 report as "the most unfortunate event in the life of the Special Committee." Kenneth Culp Davis likewise criticized Pound's analysis. Davis concluded that although examples of unfortunate administrative practices could be found, Pound's method of drawing broad conclusions from such examples was open to question.

In 1963 Judge Henry Friendly argued that better standards were needed to guide broad and vague delegations of power.

== Jurisdiction ==
The authority of federal administrative agencies stems from their organic statutes, and must be consistent with constitutional constraints and the scope of authority granted by statute.

== Rulemaking ==
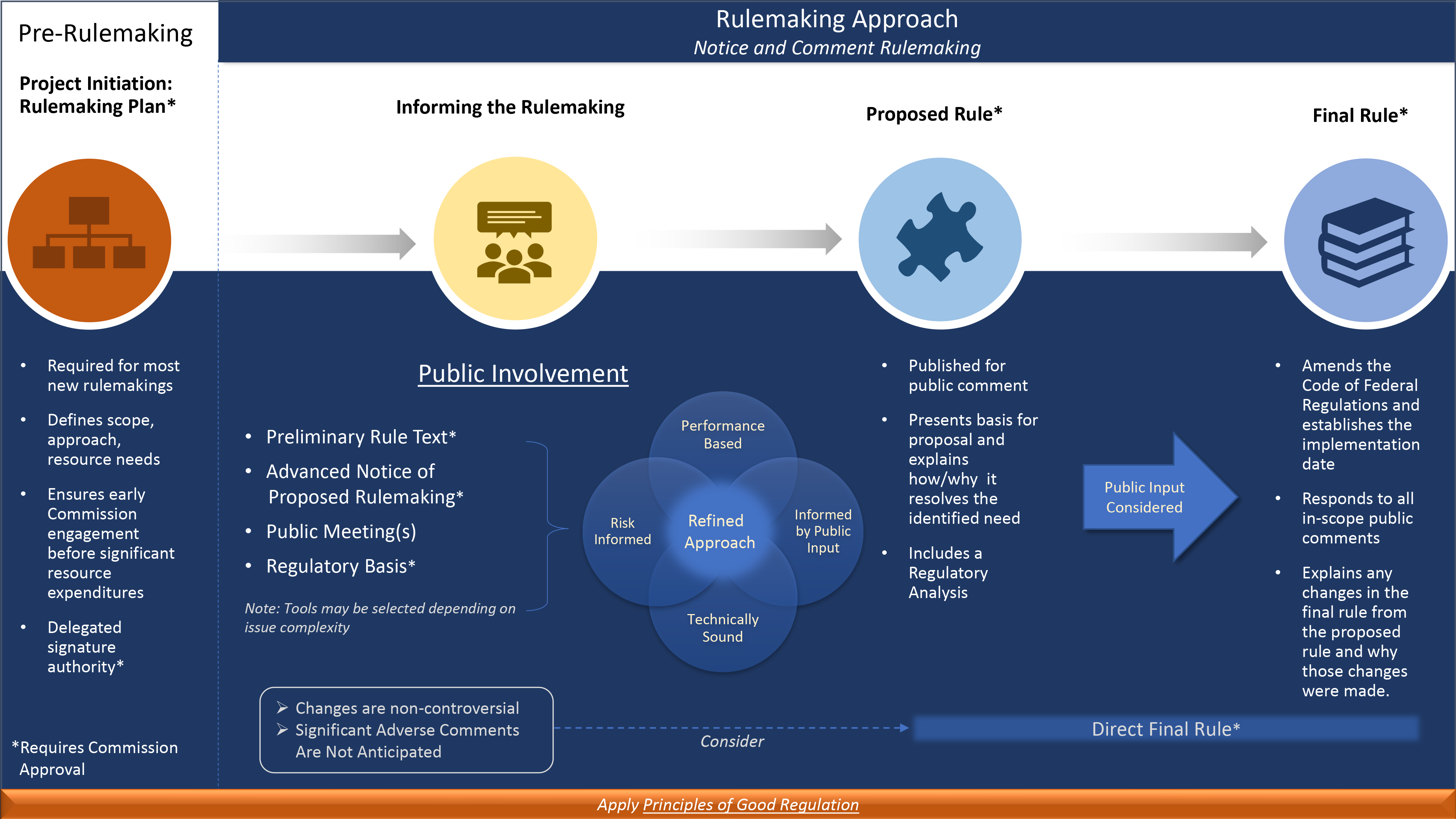
A partial diagram of the rulemaking process as described by the Nuclear Regulatory Commission in 2021

Federal administrative agencies, when granted the power to do so in a statutory grant of authority from Congress, may promulgate rules that have force of law. Agencies "legislate" through rulemaking—the power to promulgate (or issue) regulations. Such regulations are codified in the Code of Federal Regulations (CFR) and published in the Federal Register. Rules of lesser effect are published in a host of forms, including manuals for agency staff and for the public, circulars, bulletins, letter rulings, press releases, and the like.

=== Administrative law statutes governing rulemaking ===
Section 551 of the Administrative Procedure Act gives the following definitions:

- Rulemaking is "an agency process for formulating, amending, or repealing a rule."
- A rule in turn is "the whole or a part of an agency statement of general or particular applicability and future effect designed to implement, interpret, or prescribe law or policy."

The primary administrative law statutes and other laws that govern agency rule making include:

- The Administrative Procedure Act, 5 U.S.C. §§ 552 and 553
- The Housekeeping Act, 5 U.S.C. § 301, which gives heads of agencies authority to issue rules for agency employees
- The Regulatory Flexibility Act, 5 U.S.C. §§ 601 et seq., which requires agencies to consider the needs of small entities in rule making
- The Paperwork Reduction Act, 44 U.S.C. §§ 3501 et seq., which limits the power of an agency to collect information from the public
- The Congressional Review Act, 5 U.S.C. §§ 801–808, which gives Congress the authority to review and veto any agency regulation
- The Independent Offices Appropriations Act of 1952, 31 U.S.C. §§ 9701, which limits the power of agencies to set user fees
- Executive Order 12866, which requires agencies to use cost-benefit balancing in all regulatory actions

=== Scope and extent of rulemaking power ===
Limits on the power of agencies to promulgate regulations include:

1. The regulation must lie within a grant of power from Congress, and that delegation must in turn be constitutional (courts almost never invalidate a regulation on this ground). The power must be granted in the agency's organic statute, and extends so far as legislative intent as fairly inferable from the statutory language. Statutory grants of authority to agencies are generally construed more strictly than the "necessary and proper" power of Congress granted in Article I, section 8, clause 18 of the Constitution.
2. The regulation must lie within that grant of rulemaking authority (in the extreme case, Congress sometimes includes an explicit limit on the agency's authority). Some agencies have power to promulgate both substantive rules as well as procedural rules; some (like the IRS, EEOC, and Patent and Trademark Office) may promulgate only procedural rules. When Congress grants that authority retroactively, courts carefully scrutinize the case, and sometimes bless the regulation, and sometimes invalidate it.
3. The regulation must be promulgated with observance of the procedures required by the statutes set forth in the previous section. Among these procedures, one of the most important is the requirement that an agency set forth factual findings sufficient to support a rational basis or by procedures otherwise inadequate to meet the statutes listed above.

Agencies may not promulgate retroactive rules unless expressly granted such power by the agency's organic statute. Bowen v. Georgetown University Hospital, 488 U.S. 204 (1988)

Agencies are permitted to rely on rules in reaching their decisions rather than adjudicate, where the promulgation of the rules is within the agency's statutory authority, and the rules themselves are not arbitrary or capricious. Heckler v. Campbell, 461 U.S. 458 (1983).

Agencies must abide by their own rules and regulations. Accardi v. Shaughnessy, 347 U.S. 260 (1954).

Courts must defer to administrative agency interpretations of the authority granted to them by Congress (1) where the intent of Congress was ambiguous and (2) where the interpretation was reasonable or permissible. Chevron U.S.A., Inc. v. Natural Resources Defense Council, Inc., 467 U.S. 837 (1984). Chevron is probably the most frequently cited case in American administrative law. However, in June 2024, the Supreme Court overruled Chevron in Loper Bright Enterprises v. Raimondo; past administrative decisions made before Loper Bright under the Chevron deference remained in place, but future agency administration actions in interpreting Congressional language are more likely to be subject to judicial review.

=== Type of rulemaking ===
There are six levels of rulemaking procedure:

- Formal rulemaking, which is rulemaking for which the organic statute requires that rules be "made on the record after opportunity for an agency hearing" (that is, a trial-type hearing that is taken down by a transcriptionist into the record and for which the APA prescribes particular procedures). The phrase "on the record" is required to trigger requirements for formal rulemaking; simply requiring that rules be made "after a hearing" does not trigger the requirements of formal rulemaking.
- Informal rulemaking, also known as "notice-and-comment rulemaking", which is rulemaking for which no procedural requirements are prescribed in the organic statute, and for which the APA requires only notice and comment.
- Hybrid rulemaking, which is rulemaking for which particular procedural requirements beyond notice and comment are prescribed, but does not rise to the level of formal rulemaking.
- Negotiated rulemaking under 5 U.S.C. §§ 561–570 of the Administrative Procedure Act.
- Publication rulemaking, or "nonlegislative rulemaking", typically for procedural rules, interpretative rules, or matters relating to agency management or personnel, that an agency may promulgate by publication in the Federal Register.
- Guidance

=== Guidance and nonlegislative rules: interpretative rules, "statements of policy" and publications not in the Federal Register ===
"Nonlegislative rules" include three main classes:

- interpretative rules under 5 U.S.C. § 553(b)(A), which interpret ambiguities in binding rules, but themselves have only the limited binding effect of Skidmore deference.
- "statements of general policy", purely hortatory rules directed to the public, also promulgated under 5 U.S.C. § 553(b)(A). Typically, a "statement of policy" uses words like "should" instead of "must" or "shall", to advise the public of an agency's preference that the agency does not intend to enforce.
- "housekeeping rules" or "matters relating to agency management or personnel" directed to agency staff, including agency staff manuals, staff instructions and memoranda, and the like, promulgated under 5 U.S.C. § 301 and authority delegated to agency heads.

A class called "guidance" includes all rules not promulgated by legislative procedure. Such rules may be published as guidance, guidelines, agency staff manuals, staff instructions, opinion letters, interpretive memoranda, policy statements, guidance manuals for the public, circulars, bulletins, advisories, compliance guides, press releases stating agency position, and the like. Guidance documents include, but are not limited to, agency interpretations or policies that relate to: issues within the agency's scope of authority or regulatory program; design, production, manufacturing, control, remediation, testing, analysis or assessment of products and substances, and the processing, content, and evaluation/approval of submissions or applications. The class of "guidance" is almost, but not exactly, coextensive with the union of the sets of interpretative rules, general statements of policy, and housekeeping rules.

==== Agency interpretations: § 553(d) "interpretative rules" vs. Chevron/Auer interpretations ====
Every statute and regulation has some lingering ambiguity. Someone has to have authority to adopt some interpretation, and do so with a minimum of procedural delay. So the law grants every agency the authority to promulgate interpretative rules, and to do so with minimal procedural fuss. By default, most interpretations slot into the *interpretative rule" category of 5 U.S.C. § 553(b).

If an interpretation satisfies a long list of criteria, then the interpretation is binding on parties before the agency, courts, and the agency itself, under Chevron U.S.A. Inc. v. Natural Resources Defense Council, Inc. (for agency interpretations of statute) or Auer v. Robbins (for agency interpretations of regulations). (The inquiries under Chevron and Auer are slightly different. But the analytical similarities overshadow the differences. For this short article, we will gloss over the differences, and treat Chevron and Auer together.)

Any interpretation that fails any one of the Chevron/Auer eligibility bullets from the list below falls into the residual category of "interpretative rule".

===== Interpretative rules and Skidmore deference =====
Fundamentally, the § 553(b) "interpretative" exemption from notice and comment is a rule of necessity—essentially all laws have some ambiguity, that ambiguity has to be interpreted, and (for public-facing substantive rules) the agency is the party that can do so expeditiously and fairly. Deference follows to the degree the agency demonstrates fairness and diligence in developing its interpretation (under Chevron, Auer, or Skidmore v. Swift & Co., as appropriate).

The quid pro quo for an agency's choice to exercise the "interpretative" option, and forego the formalities required for legislative rulemaking or for Chevron or Auer deference, is that the agency has very little enhanced power to enforce its interpretation. If a party challenges the agency's interpretation, an agency's invocation of the "interpretative" exemption surrenders any claim to heightened Chevron or Auer deference, and the interpretation falls into the residual category, under which a court gives Skidmore deference to an agency's informed position:

We consider that the rulings, interpretations and opinions of the [agency], while not controlling upon the courts by reason of their authority, do constitute a body of experience and informed judgment to which courts and litigants may properly resort for guidance. The weight of such a judgment in a particular case will depend upon the thoroughness evident in its consideration, the validity of its reasoning, its consistency with earlier and later pronouncements, and all those factors which give it power to persuade, if lacking power to control.

As a practical matter, an agency operates under the agency's interpretative rules. The law permits parties before the agency to argue alternative interpretations, and under the law, agencies are supposed to respond to the arguments, and not foreclose alternatives suggested by parties. But as a practical matter, agencies seldom give anything more than short shrift consideration to alternatives. On judicial review, the practical reality is that a court is most likely to agree with the agency, under Skidmore deference. But Skidmore deference is only as strong as the quality of the agency's analysis, and courts regularly overturn "interpretative" rules.

===== Chevron/Auer: Formal interpretations of statutes or regulations =====
Some agency interpretations are binding on parties and the courts, under Chevron deference:

Under the familiar two-step Chevron analysis, "[w]e always first determine 'whether Congress has directly spoken to the precise question at issue.'" "We do so by employing the traditional tools of statutory construction: we examine the statute’s text, structure, and legislative history, and apply the relevant canons of interpretation." "If we find 'that Congress had an intention on the precise question at issue, that intention is the law and must be given effect ... .'" If we conclude that "Congress either had no intent on the matter, or that Congress' purpose and intent is unclear", then we proceed to step two, in which we ask "whether the agency’s interpretation is based on a permissible construction of the statutory language at issue".

But an agency has to earn this deference; it is far from automatic. When an agency interprets its own organic statute (for Chevron) or a regulation that it promulgated (under Auer), and the interpretation meets all the following prerequisites, only then does the agency receive the high deference of Chevron or Auer.

- Under "Chevron step zero", an agency only receives deference when interpreting a statute or rule within its delegated authority, and that it is charged with administering.
- Under "Chevron/Auer step one", an agency only earns high Chevron/Auer deference for an interpretation where there is an ambiguity in words in the statute or rule, or a delegation of authority by Congress to fill gaps.
- Under "Chevron/Auer step two", an agency interpretation only receives deference if it is a "reasonable" interpretation of the statutory language considered with statements of Congressional intent, and is supported by a reasonable explanation.

In addition to the three classical steps, an agency must observe additional procedural formalities:

- Not every silence is a Chevron/Auer "gap": the agency must be charged with filling the gap. Silences without a Congressional rulemaking charge are just silences, leaving the underlying default in place.
- The interpretation or implementing regulation at issue must tend to resolve the precise ambiguity or fill the precise gap: overly imprecise rules or interpretations do not receive Chevron or Auer deference.
- High Chevron/Auer deference requires that the agency publish its interpretation with some degree of formality, including any procedural formalities that Congress specifies, either for agencies in general (such as the Paperwork Reduction Act), or specific to the agency—while full-blown notice and comment is not a prerequisite to Chevron/Auer deference, informal statements of agency interpretation are not entitled to Chevron/Auer deference.
- High Chevron/Auer deference requires some level of consistency by the agency.
- An agency can lose Chevron/Auer deference in a specific case if its adjudicatory procedures in that case were haphazard.
- Chevron/Auer only applies to an agency's interpretations of a statute or rule reached on its own reasoned decisionmaking, not to interpretations of Congressional intent or case law, which are the purview of the judicial branch.
- Congress may specify procedures that an agency must use in its gap-filling—a delegation of authority to make "rules" invokes the § 553 defaults for procedure, while a charge to promulgate "regulations" implicates legislative procedure.

===== "Interpretative" rules and "shortcut procedure" exemption of § 553(b) =====
An "interpretative" rule sets out the agency's interpretation of a statute or rule, without altering rights or obligations. If the interpretation fails at least one of the Chevron/Auer criteria, then the interpretation falls into the category of "interpretative rule" which binds only the agency itself, and is entitled to at most Skidmore deference.

====== Availability of the § 553(b) "interpretative" exemption ======
The line for permissible exercise of the § 553(b) "interpretative" exemption is blurry—courts and treatise writers uniformly complain about this. The most basic requirement for the "interpretative" exemption is that the agency "interpret" a validly promulgated law (statute or regulation), by following a recognizable interpretative path originally set out by the statute or regulation. An agency may promulgate an "interpretative" rule "only if the agency's position can be characterized as an 'interpretation' of a statute or legislative regulation rather than as an exercise of independent policymaking authority." Mere "consistency" (in the sense of "absence of clash") is insufficient. Most "gap filling" is beyond the scope of *interpretative" authority. A valid interpretative rule merely explains, but does not add to or alter, the law that already exists in the form of a statute or legislative rule. An "interpretative" rule cannot create a new requirement, carve-out, or exception from whole cloth. If the rule changes "individual rights and obligations" (rather than resolving ambiguity), the rule requires legislative procedure.

An agency may promulgate interpretative rules outside the scope of its rule making authority. Where an agency can only issue legislative rules pursuant to an express grant of authority from Congress, an agency may (and is encouraged to) issue advisory interpretations to guide the public.

If an agency elects the "interpretative" shortcut, there are almost no procedural requirements, beyond the publication required by 5 U.S.C. § 552 and § 552(d). The decision maker must ensure that there is indeed an ambiguity that is not resolved by any binding law; however, if the ambiguity exists, the decision maker simply interprets it to the best of their ability. If the issue is outside the agency's scope of rule making authority, the agency must follow the agency or courts that do have authority on that specific issue.

====== Consequence of the "interpretative" exemption ======
In return for the privilege of bypassing rule making procedure, the agency risks loss of binding effect for an interpretative rule. "An agency issuing an interpretative rule ... may well intend that its interpretation bind its own personnel and may expect compliance from regulated individuals or entities. Nonetheless, the agency cannot expect the interpretation to be binding in court; because it does not have the force of law, parties can challenge the interpretation." Many courts have characterized interpretative rules as only "hortatory" and "lacking force of law".

In proceedings before the agency, a party may advance alternative positions or interpretations, and the agency must address them, without relying on an interpretative rule as the last word. But as a practical matter, agencies tend to enforce their interpretative rules until forced to concede error, and parties simply acquiesce until the costs of the agency's interpretation exceed the cost of court litigation.

Interpretative rules are binding on agency employees, including its administrative law judges (ALJs). If an interpretative rule (say, a provision of an agency staff manual, or memorandum to agency staff, or interpretation in a Federal Register rulemaking notice) sets a "floor" under the rights of a party, individual employees have no discretion to back out of the agency's interpretation or create ad hoc exceptions adverse to the party.

On judicial review, the effect of an interpretative rule was explained by the Eighth Circuit, discussing "well-settled principles of administrative law":

Rules enacted by an administrative agency pursuant to statutory delegation [and with notice-and-comment procedure or formal rulemaking procedure], called substantive or legislative rules, must be judicially enforced as if laws enacted by Congress itself. Rules not enacted pursuant to an explicit statutory delegation of lawmaking power, called interpretive rules, are issued merely to provide guidance to parties whose conduct may be governed by the underlying statute, and to courts which must construe it. They "carry no more weight on judicial review than their inherent persuasiveness commands". They cannot be independently enforced as law. As a consequence of this distinction, while an administrative agency delegated legislative power may sue to enforce its legislative rule, just as it may sue to enforce a statute, it cannot ground legal action in a violation of its interpretive rule. Rather, the agency must demonstrate to the court that no mere interpretive rule, but the underlying statute, has been violated. Certainly a court should give great weight to an agency's interpretation, as reflected in its interpretive rule, of the statute it administers, to determine the scope of the statute and whether it has been violated. But clearly, a claim of conduct inconsistent with an interpretive rule is advanced only to show that the statute itself has been violated. An action based on a violation of an interpretive rule does not state a legal claim. Being in nature hortatory, rather than mandatory, interpretive rules never can be violated.

=== “Statements of policy” ===
"Statements of policy" are even weaker statements than "interpretative" rules. Agencies use them to express agency preferences, but with no binding effect. Policy statements are "tentative intentions", nonbinding rules of thumb, suggestions for conduct, and tentative indications of an agency's hopes. Policy statements have no binding effect. A policy statement "genuinely leaves the agency and its decisionmakers free to exercise discretion", and "a statement of policy may not have a present effect: a 'general statement of policy' is one that does not impose any rights and obligations".

Agency policy statements are not binding on courts, and therefore receive no Chevron deference, not even weak Skidmore deference.

=== Guidance ===
"Guidance" is a residual category for any rule issued by an agency but not in a formally promulgated regulation. Most non-Chevron interpretative rules, and most general statements of policy, are issued as guidance.

Only three classes of law administered by agencies are binding against members of the public: statute (as interpreted by the courts), regulations, and common law. Against members of the public, the default rule, embodied in the Administrative Procedure Act, 5 U.S.C. § 553, and elaborated in the Good Guidance Bulletin, is that subregualtory guidance documents do not have force of law, and do not bind the public. Perez v. Mortgage Bankers Association, 575 U.S. 82 (2015); e.g., 15 C.F.R. § 29.2. Nothing in agency guidance documents is binding against members of the public, except—

- Quotes of statutes or regulations (but they are binding because they are statutes or regulations, not because they are in the guidance document)
- Interpretations of genuine ambiguity in statute or regulation—until those interpretations have been confirmed by an Article III court, they are just the agency's best current interpretive guess, and are not firmly binding. In most cases, a member of the public is permitted to argue for an alternative interpretation (though of course the agency will often not entertain the suggestion; they may have to go to court to get it recognized).
- For this purpose, silence is not ambiguity. An agency cannot point to a silence in statute or regulation, and claim that that silence is license to gap fill the silence in any way that creates new obligations on the public or carves out from an obligation of the agency. Only statutes and regulations are binding against the public; therefore subregulatory guidance cannot have independent binding effect against any member of the public, it can only interpret ambiguity.
- Against agency personnel in ex parte matters (that is, where an agency acts solely to confine its own discretion with no adverse effect on any party), guidance is binding against agency personnel. Guidance against the agency arises as a permissive power under the Housekeeping Act, 5 U.S.C. § 301, and a long line of Supreme Court cases originating with Accardi v. Shaughnessy, 347 U.S. 260 (1954). Classes of binding statements include:
  - Sentences that state mandatory actions of agency personnel, for example "Agency staff must ..." or "The agency will ...—an agency can bind its employees via an employee manual, but cannot bind the public.
  - When an agency's guidance promises "If a party before the agency does x, the agency promises to do (favorable) y." The agency is bound to keep such promises.
  - When an agency guidance document interprets an ambiguity in a way that is favorable to a party before the agency in an ex parte proceeding, the party can rely on it, and no agency employee can back out.

An agency can change its guidance with very little procedure (unlike a regulation), but as long as the guidance reads as it does, parties are entitled to rely on it for the three classes of promises listed above.

In the late 1990s and early 2000s, many agencies attempted to bypass the APA's requirements for rulemaking by tucking rules that went beyond interpretation of ambiguity into informal documents like agency staff manuals and the like. This is simply illegal. The Executive Office of the President stepped in to stop bootleg rulemaking in 2007, and forbade this practice. Some agencies, for example, the U.S. Patent and Trademark Office, have nonetheless continued to defy the law, and state their formal refusal to implement the President's directive.

=== Review by Office of Management and Budget and Congressional Review Act ===
Executive Order 12866, which was issued in 1993, requires agencies (other than independent agencies) to submit proposed rules for reviews by the Office of Information and Regulatory Affairs if the rule meets certain criteria. Rules that are "economically significant" (meeting the criteria of "an annual effect on the economy of $100 million or more or adversely affect in a material way the economy") require a cost-benefit analysis.

The Congressional Review Act passed in 1996 created a category of major rules, which are those that OIRA determines result in either: (1) "an annual effect on the economy of $100,000,000", (2) "a major increase in costs or prices for consumers, individual industries, Federal, State, or local government agencies, or geographic regions", or (3) "significant adverse effects on competition, employment, investment, productivity, innovation, or on the ability of United States-based enterprises to compete with foreign-based enterprises in domestic and export markets". If the rule is major, an additional report must be provided to congressional committees.

About 2,500 to 4,000 rules are published per year. Of those, in 2012, 68% were classified as Routine/Info/Other while the remainder were Significant/Substantive. From 1997 to 2012, the number of major rules for Congressional Review Act purposes has ranged from 100 (2010) to 50 (2002).

== Adjudication ==
Section 551 of the Administrative Procedure Act gives the following definitions:

- Adjudication is "an agency process for the formulation of an order";
- An order in turn is "the whole or part of a final disposition ... of an agency in a matter other than rule making but including licensing".

Many U.S. federal agencies have the power to adjudicate, typically to rule on applications for some benefit or license, or to enforce laws within their specific areas of delegated power. Many agencies (especially those providing some benefit or license) conduct their initial informal adjudications via hearings officers, clerks, or examiners, including patent examiners, social security officers, or trademark examining attorneys. A few agencies start with more-formal adjudications, such as the National Labor Relations Board, Merit Systems Protection Board, and Nuclear Regulatory Commission. These more-formal proceedings of first instance are conducted before a tribunal of lawyers with titles such as administrative law judge (ALJ), administrative patent judge, or the like. Finally, almost all agencies provide for some form of intra-agency appeal. In some cases, those intra-agency appeals are heard by intra-agency judges (for example, a person disappointed by an initial determination of a social security officer can appeal to an ALJ, a patent applicant disappointed by an initial decision of a patent examiner can appeal to a panel of APJs), or a person disappointed by a decision of an ALJ can appeal to the full Commission or Board (for example, the International Trade Commission or National Labor Relations Board). For some agencies, there can be multiple levels of decision-making and review. For example, for a social security determination, there can be four levels of review within the social security administration before a claimant appeals to a court.

=== Right to a hearing ===
There are two ways that an individual can attain the right to a hearing in an adjudicative proceeding. First, the Due Process Clause of the 5th Amendment or 14th Amendment can require that a hearing be held if the interest that is being adjudicated is sufficiently important or if, without a hearing, there is a strong chance that the petitioner will be erroneously denied that interest. A hearing can also be required if a statute somehow mandates the agency to hold formal hearings when adjudicating certain issues.

=== Conclusion ===
The adjudication will typically be completed with a written report containing findings of fact and conclusions of law, both at the state and federal level. If the affected does not wish to contest the action, a consent order may be published allowing for the hearing to be bypassed.

== Determining whether rulemaking or adjudication is appropriate ==
The Administrative Procedure Act puts "adjudication" and "rulemaking" on opposite sides of a "dichotomy".

Agency actions are divided into two broad categories discussed above, rulemaking and adjudication. For agency decisions that have broad impact on a number of parties, including parties not specifically before the agency, the agency must use the procedures of rulemaking (see the bullet list in § Administrative law statutes governing rulemaking above). Because actions by rulemaking affect many parties, rulemaking procedures are designed to ensure public participation, and are therefore more cumbersome, except that the agency is permitted to seek comment by publication of notice, without soliciting the views of specific parties. For decisions that, at first instance, affect only a small number of parties that actually appear before the agency (see § Adjudication above), the agency may use procedures that are generally simpler, but that require the agency specifically solicit input from the directly affected parties before the agency applies the rule more broadly.

Adjudication decisions may become precedent that binds future parties, so the transition zone between the scope of issues requiring rulemaking and the scope of issues that may be determined by case-by-case adjudication is very hazy.

The classical test for the dividing line is seen in the contrast between two cases decided a few years apart, both involving taxes levied by the city of Denver Colorado. In 1908, in Londoner v. City and County of Denver, a tax levied on residents of a particular street was held to be an adjudication, and the Supreme Court ordered the city to do a "do over", because the residents of the street were not given sufficient opportunity to be heard. Then, in 1915, in Bi-Metallic Investment Co. v. State Board of Equalization, a tax levied on the entire city of Denver was held to be rulemaking, and the city's action of imposing the tax was affirmed.

Factors tending to make an act adjudicative in nature:

- Involving a small number of people
- Individuals involved are specially affected by the act
- Decision based on the facts of an individual case, rather than policy concerns

For most agencies, the choice of whether to promulgate rules or proceed by common law adjudicative decisions rests in the informed discretion of agencies. SEC v. Chenery Corp., 332 U.S. 194 (1947) (Dissenting opinion arguing that the decision permitted agencies to rule arbitrarily, without law). Agencies may also announce new policies in the course of such adjudications. Some agencies' organic statutes obligate the agency to use rulemaking, for example, the U.S. Patent and Trademark Office, 35 U.S.C. § 2(b)(2)(B).

== Judicial review ==
A party aggrieved by an agency action (either rulemaking or adjudication) may seek judicial review (that is, sue) as provided by an agency's organic statute or by §§ 701-706 of the Administrative Procedure Act.

Studies of judicial review typically find that 70% of agency rules are upheld with the Supreme Court upholding 91% of rules; a 2011 empirical study of judicial review found that 76% were upheld, although the D.C. Circuit, which hears many administrative law cases, has been found less deferential than other courts.

== State-level administrative law ==
U.S. states may have their own administrative law; for example, a state constitution may allow the legislature to delegate rule-making authority to an executive or independent agency, and state governments may provide an administrative appeal process for people who are dissatisfied with decisions made by certain state agencies.

Many states, such as Kentucky, have been less willing than the federal government to allow their agencies to promulgate rules with the effect of substantive law.

The states have instituted home rule for cities in various ways giving cities broad powers to enact any law that is not prohibited by the state's Constitution, or already addressed by State Laws or State Codes. This widespread institution of home rule has resulted in more administrative laws being passed by the cities.

The State of California has an extensive body of administrative law, having first passed the California Administrative Procedure Act (APA) in 1945. California's Office of Administrative Hearings aims to resolve administrative disputes arising out of actions within the state. Its administrative law judges are lawyers.

== See also ==
- United Kingdom administrative law
- Public service law in the United States
- Administrative law judge
- List of United States administrative law cases
