= List of United States administrative law cases =

== Legality of Statutory Schemes ==
- Immigration and Naturalization Service v. Chadha (1983) - Congress may not reserve a "legislative veto" over delegated authority.
- Commodity Futures Trading Commission v. Schor (1986) - Delegation of judicial power to an agency.
- Morrison v. Olson (1988) - Congressional control over executive branch limitations.
- Gade v. National Solid Wastes Management Association (1992) - Ways in which Federal law preempts state law.
- Printz v. United States (1997) - Federal Government may not "commandeer" state executive or administrative officials.
- Whitman v. American Trucking Associations, Inc. (2001) - delegation of legislative-like authority must be governed by an "intelligible principle."

== Appropriate Deference to Agency ==
- Skidmore v. Swift & Co. (1944) - deference to agency "rules" and interpretations not intended by Congress to carry the "force of law."
- Universal Camera Corp. v. NLRB (1951) - Court must consider ALJ's contrary ruling when reviewing agency ruling.
- Richardson v. Perales (1971) - agency may rely on hearsay evidence over non-hearsay evidence and still meet the "substantial evidence" requirement for proving a fact.
- Citizens to Preserve Overton Park v. Volpe (1971) - Important case applying the "arbitrary and capricious" review to rule-making.
- Motor Vehicles Manufacturers Association v. State Farm (1983) - "arbitrary and capricious" to change rule without considering other options for the change.
- Chevron U.S.A., Inc. v. Natural Resources Defense Council, Inc. (1984) - What level of deference should an agency's interpretation of its own statute receive in areas where such interpretations were intended by Congress to have the "force of law"?
- Block v. Community Nutrition Institute (1984) - presumption of court reviewability overcome when statutory scheme indicates no congressional intent to create a private right.
- Bowen v. Michigan Academy of Family Physicians (1986) - Statutory presumption of reviewability not overcome.
- Webster v. Doe (1988) - may not review agency action where "no law to apply."
- Martin v. Occupational Safety and Health Review Commission (1991) - When adjudication and rule-making power is split between two agencies, court should defer to rule-making agency's interpretations.
- Auer v. Robbins (1997) - How much deference should an agency interpretation of its own regulations get?
- United States v. Mead Corp. (2001) - What level of deference should an agency's interpretation receive when not intended to have the "force of law"? How to decide if Congress intended to have the "force of law"?
- Norton v. S. Utah Wilderness Alliance (2004) - Under APA, court can only force the agency to act when it has failed to act when the required act is non-discretionary in nature.

== Limits on Agency Power ==
Statutory Interpretation

- FDA v. Brown & Williamson Tobacco Corp. (2000) - Existence and scope of authority to rule-make (applying Chevron).
- Bowen v. Georgetown University Hospital (1988) - whether retroactive rulemaking is permitted

== The Administrative Procedure Act (APA) ==
- United States v. Florida East Coast Railway Co. (1973) - formal rule-making requires statute that requires "hearing on the record."
- Vermont Yankee Nuclear Power Corp. v. Natural Resources Defense Council, Inc. (1978) - courts may not impose additional procedural requirements on top of the APA in rule-making.
- Pension Benefit Guaranty Corporation v. LTV Corporation (1990) - informal adjudication must meet the requirements of APA sec. 555.

== Procedural Due Process ==
- Londoner v. City and County of Denver (1908) - Due process requirements for adjudication (Cf. Bi-Metallic)
- Bi-Metallic Investment Co. v. State Board of Equalization (1915) - Due process requirements for rule-making.
- Goldberg v. Kelly (1970) - When does state or federal law create rights protected by due process?
- Mathews v. Eldridge (1976) - What level of procedural due process is required?
- Logan v. Zimmerman Brush Co. (1982) – Does an adjudicating agency's termination of an action due to its own failure to comply with the law deny due process to the complainant?

== Limits on Power to Make Policy Through Adjudication ==
- SEC v. Chenery Corp. (1947) - Impermissible creation of retroactive "rules" through adjudication.
- U.S. v. Storer Broadcasting Co. (1956) - agency can make regulations particularizing statute in order to bar some claims at the threshold.
- NLRB v. Wyman-Gordon Co. (1969) - making "rules" through adjudication.
- NLRB v. Bell-Aerospace Co. (1974) - can make "rules" through adjudication as long as not abuse of discretion.

== See also ==
- United States administrative law
