= Bright-line rule =

Judicial test using clearly defined and objective factors

A bright-line rule (or bright-line test) is a clearly defined rule or standard, composed of objective factors, which leaves little or no room for varying interpretation. The purpose of a bright-line rule is to produce predictable and consistent results in its application. The term "bright-line" in this sense generally occurs in a legal context.

Bright-line rules are usually standards established by courts in legal precedent or by legislatures in statutory provisions. The US Supreme Court often contrasts bright-line rules with their opposite: balancing tests (or "fine line testing"), where a result depends on weighing several factors—which could lead to inconsistent application of law or reduce objectivity.

== Debate in the US ==
In the United States, there is much scholarly legal debate between those favoring bright-line rules and those favoring balancing tests. While some legal scholars, such as former Supreme Court Justice Antonin Scalia, have expressed a strong preference for bright-line rules, critics often argue that bright-line rules are overly simplistic and can lead to harsh and unjust results. Supreme Court Justice Stephen Breyer noted that there are circumstances in which the application of bright-line rules would be inappropriate, stating that "no single set of legal rules can ever capture the ever changing complexity of human life."

== Examples ==
Miranda v. Arizona (1966) may be considered establishing a bright-line rule. The majority opinion in that case required law enforcement agents to give a criminal suspect what is now known as a Miranda warning of their "Miranda" rights when the suspect is in custody, and when the suspect is about to be interrogated.

The Taxation (Bright-line Test for Residential Land) Act 2015 is a form of Capital Gains Tax legislation in New Zealand. When it was introduced a bright-line test was described as, "a term used in law for a clearly-defined rule or standard, using objective factors, which is designed to produce predictable and consistent results."

=== Notable cases containing bright-line rules ===
- Goldberg v. Kelly (1970) ruled that the due process requirement requires an evidentiary hearing before a recipient of certain government welfare benefits can be deprived of such benefits.
- Michigan v. Summers (1981) held that for Fourth Amendment purposes, a warrant to search for contraband founded on probable cause implicitly carries with it the limited authority to detain the occupants of the premises while a proper search is conducted.
- SEC v. Chenery Corp., 332 U.S. 194 (1947)
- Aguilar v. Texas, 378 U.S. 108 (1964)
- Miranda v. Arizona, 384 U.S. 436 (1966)
- Katko v. Briney, 183 N.W.2d 657 (Iowa 1971)
- Heckler v. Campbell, 461 U.S. 458 (1983)
- Bowen v. Georgetown University Hospital, 488 U.S. 204 (1988)
- Evans v. the United Kingdom
- Kyllo v. United States, 533 U.S. 27 (2001)
- Arizona v. Gant, 556 U.S. 332 (2009)

=== Notable cases not following bright-line rules ===
- District of Columbia v. Heller
