= Chenery =

Chenery is a surname. Notable people with the surname include:

- Ben Chenery (born 1977), British footballer
- Charles Chenery (1850–1928), British footballer
- Christopher Chenery (1886–1973), American engineer, businessman and racehorse breeder
- Craig W. Chenery, British-born author and screenwriter
- Diane Chenery-Wickens (1959–2008), British film and television make-up artist
- Hollis B. Chenery (1918–1994), American economist
- Olivia Chenery (born 1989), English actress and environmental advocate
- Penny Chenery (1922–2017), American sportswoman
- Thomas Chenery (1826–1884), British scholar and newspaper editor

== Other uses ==
- Short form of Securities and Exchange Commission v. Chenery Corporation, either of two United States Supreme Court decisions about American federal administrative law:
  - SEC v. Chenery Corp. (1943) (also called Chenery I)
  - SEC v. Chenery Corp. (1947) (also called Chenery II)
