= Scribner v. Straus =

- Supreme Court of the United States

Argued April 16, 1908 Decided June 1, 1908
- Full case name: Scribner v. Straus
- Citations: 210 U.S. 352 (more) 28 S. Ct. 735; 52 L. Ed. 1094

Holding
- Copyright holders did not have the statutory right to control the price of subsequent resales of lawfully purchased copies of their work.

Court membership
- Chief Justice Melville Fuller Associate Justices John M. Harlan · David J. Brewer; Edward D. White · Rufus W. Peckham; Joseph McKenna · Oliver W. Holmes Jr. William R. Day · William H. Moody

Case opinion
- Majority: Day, joined by a unanimous court

Scribner v. Straus, 210 U.S. 352 (1908), was a United States Supreme Court case in which the Court held copyright holders did not have the statutory right to control the price of subsequent resales of lawfully purchased copies of their work.

The court decided this case immediately after Bobbs-Merrill Co. v. Straus, which featured the same defendants, Isador Straus and Nathan Straus, being accused of copyright infringement for the same reason by a different company. The result of Bobbs-Merrill Co. v. Straus held sway here.
