= Discretion =

Power to act on one's own authority

Discretion is the power or right to decide or act according to one's own judgment, freedom of judgment or choice. In a broader social context, it refers to the quality of being discreet, encompassing the ability to behave or speak in such a way as to avoid causing offense or revealing private information.

The concept is foundational in various fields, particularly in law, where it refers to the authority granted to an official (such as a judge or police officer) to make decisions based on their assessment of the specific circumstances rather than by strict adherence to a rigid code. It acts as a necessary counterbalance to the rigidity of written rules, allowing for equity and mercy in complex human situations.

== Etymology ==
The term originates from the Latin discretio, a noun meaning "separation," "distinction," or "discrimination." This is derived from the past participle of the verb discernere, meaning "to separate" or "to distinguish." Entering Middle English via Old French, the word originally denoted the capacity to make intellectual distinctions. Over time, the meaning shifted from the act of distinguishing to the quality of having the capacity to distinguish between right and wrong, or wise and unwise choices, eventually implying prudence and confidentiality.

== Discretion in law ==
In legal theory, discretion is the flexibility entrusted to the individuals and institutions that enforce and interpret the law. It acknowledges that statutory language cannot foresee every possible scenario and that strict literalism can sometimes lead to unjust outcomes. Kenneth Culp Davis, a pioneering scholar on the subject, argued that discretion is a necessary component of modern administration but requires checks to prevent arbitrariness.

=== Judicial discretion ===
Judicial discretion is the power of the judiciary to make legal decisions according to their discretion and judgment, within the general framework of the law. This power is most visible in four key areas:

Sentencing

While guidelines often exist, judges frequently have the latitude to determine the severity of a sentence. They weigh mitigating factors (such as the defendant's remorse or lack of criminal history) against aggravating factors (such as cruelty or recidivism) to determine the appropriate punishment.

Evidence admissibility

Judges act as gatekeepers of information in a trial. Under rules such as Rule 403 of the Federal Rules of Evidence in the United States, a judge has the discretion to exclude relevant evidence if its probative value is substantially outweighed by a danger of unfair prejudice, confusion of the issues, or misleading the jury.

Injunctions and equitable relief

In cases of equity, judges have broad discretion to fashion remedies that fairness demands, such as issuing restraining orders or injunctions, rather than merely awarding monetary damages.

Case management

Judges have the discretion to manage their court dockets, including granting continuances, setting trial dates, and managing the conduct of attorneys and spectators in the courtroom.

=== Prosecutorial discretion ===
Prosecutorial discretion is the authority held by the prosecution to decide whether to bring charges against a suspect, what specific charges to file, and whether to engage in plea bargaining. Legal scholars note that this power is nearly absolute in the United States, as courts rarely compel prosecutors to file charges.

Charging decisions

Prosecutors may decline to prosecute cases where the evidence is weak, where the resources required for a conviction outweigh the public benefit, or where the interest of justice is better served by alternative measures. This acts as a filter for the criminal justice system.

Plea bargaining

The vast majority of criminal cases are resolved through plea bargains. Prosecutors have the discretion to offer reduced charges or recommend lighter sentences in exchange for a guilty plea, a process that relies entirely on their judgment regarding the strength of their case and the value of cooperation.

=== Law enforcement discretion ===
Street-level bureaucrats, particularly police officers, exercise significant discretion in their daily interactions with the public. This is often referred to as the "spirit of the law" versus the "letter of the law."

Selective enforcement

Officers constantly decide which laws to enforce strictly and which to handle with warnings. For example, in traffic enforcement, an officer may choose to issue a verbal warning rather than a citation for minor speeding, based on the driver's attitude, road conditions, or the officer's current workload.

Arrest powers

In situations involving disorderly conduct or domestic disputes, officers often have to make immediate, subjective evaluations regarding whether to arrest an individual or to de-escalate the situation through other means.

=== Administrative discretion ===
In the modern administrative state, legislatures delegate substantial power to executive agencies (such as the EPA or FDA). Because legislators lack the technical expertise to write detailed regulations for every industry, they pass broad "enabling acts" that grant agencies the discretion to formulate specific rules and enforcement mechanisms.

Rulemaking

Agencies use their discretion to interpret vague statutory terms. For instance, if a law requires "safe" levels of a chemical, the agency has the technical discretion to define what "safe" means in parts per million.

Enforcement

Agencies also decide which violators to pursue. Like prosecutors, they must prioritize their investigative resources, often targeting the most egregious violators while leaving minor infractions to be handled through compliance letters or warnings.

== Constraints and review ==
While discretion provides necessary flexibility, it is not absolute. Unchecked discretion can lead to arbitrariness, discrimination, or corruption. Consequently, legal systems have developed mechanisms to review and constrain discretionary acts.

Abuse of discretion standard

In appellate review, a lower court's decision is often upheld unless it constitutes an "abuse of discretion". This is a high standard of deference, meaning the appellate court will not reverse the decision simply because they would have ruled differently; they will only reverse if the decision was arbitrary, capricious, or clearly against reason and evidence.

Wednesbury unreasonableness

In English law, the principle of Wednesbury unreasonableness, derived from the case Associated Provincial Picture Houses Ltd v Wednesbury Corp (1948), states that an administrative decision can be overturned if it is so unreasonable that no reasonable authority could ever have come to it.

Equal protection

Constitutional mandates, such as the Equal Protection Clause, limit discretion by prohibiting decisions based on race, religion, or other protected classifications. A police officer cannot use their discretion to stop drivers solely based on their ethnicity.

== In ethics and social behavior ==
Beyond the legal system, discretion is a social and ethical concept related to virtue ethics.

Prudence and tact

Social discretion involves the ability to navigate complex interpersonal dynamics without causing friction. It implies a sense of timing and context—knowing when to speak and when to remain silent. A person with discretion is often described as "tactful" or "diplomatic," capable of delivering bad news gently or navigating social faux pas without drawing attention to them.

Confidentiality and privacy

Discretion is inextricably linked to the protection of privacy. In social circles, a discreet person is trusted with secrets and personal information. Indiscretion, conversely, involves the careless sharing of information (gossip) that can damage reputations or relationships.

Professional ethics

Many professions adhere to codes of ethics that mandate discretion.

Medicine: Physicians must maintain patient confidentiality (e.g., HIPAA in the US), exercising discretion in how and with whom they discuss patient health.
Journalism: Reporters exercise discretion in protecting the identity of anonymous sources to ensure the free flow of information, weighing the public's right to know against potential harm to individuals.

== In economics ==
In macroeconomics, the term distinguishes between different types of government policy and consumer behavior.

Discretionary fiscal policy

This refers to deliberate changes in government spending and tax policies adopted in response to economic conditions, as opposed to "automatic stabilizers" (like unemployment insurance) that kick in without new legislation. For example, a government passing a stimulus package during a recession is an act of discretionary policy.

Discretionary income

In microeconomics, this is the amount of an individual's income available for spending after the essentials (such as food, clothing, and shelter) and taxes have been paid. Discretionary income fuels industries related to leisure, luxury goods, and entertainment.

== Military discretion ==
In military science, discretion is critical to the doctrine of Mission command (originally the Prussian Auftragstaktik). This doctrine emphasizes that while a commander sets the objective and the intent of a mission, subordinate officers must have the discretion to decide how to achieve those objectives based on the changing reality of the battlefield. Rigid adherence to orders without discretionary adaptation can lead to tactical failure in dynamic combat environments.

== See also ==
- Judgment (law)
- Prudence
- Administrative law
- Judicial independence
- Separation of powers
- Opportunity cost
