= Securities and Exchange Commission v. Chenery Corporation =

Securities and Exchange Commission v. Chenery Corporation may refer to:

- Securities and Exchange Commission v. Chenery Corporation (1943), 318 U.S. 80, also known as Chenery I, setting out Chenery Doctrine, a basic principle of U.S. administrative law that an agency may not defend an administrative decision on new grounds not set forth by the agency in its original decision
- Securities and Exchange Commission v. Chenery Corporation (1947), 332 U.S. 194, also known as Chenery II, upholding the ability of an agency to make administrative decisions based on the rationale that the agency provided
