= Bimetallic =

Bimetallic or bi-metallic may refer to:

- Bimetallism, a monetary standard in economics
- Bimetallic strip, a temperature sensitive mechanical device
- Alloy (binary alloy), in metallurgy, a mixture of two metals
- Bi-metallic coin
- Bi-Metallic Investment Co. v. State Board of Equalization
