= List of United States Supreme Court cases, volume 239 =

Supreme Court of the United States
- Interactive map of Supreme Court of the United States
- 38°53′26″N 77°00′16″W
- Established: March 4, 1789; 236 years ago
- Location: Washington, D.C.
- Coordinates: 38°53′26″N 77°00′16″W
- Composition method: Presidential nomination with Senate confirmation
- Authorised by: Constitution of the United States, Art. III, § 1
- Judge term length: life tenure, subject to impeachment and removal
- Number of positions: 9 (by statute)
- Website: supremecourt.gov

This is a list of cases reported in volume 239 of United States Reports, decided by the Supreme Court of the United States in 1915 and 1916.

== Justices of the Supreme Court at the time of volume 239 U.S. ==
The Supreme Court is established by Article III, Section 1 of the Constitution of the United States, which says: "The judicial Power of the United States, shall be vested in one supreme Court . . .". The size of the Court is not specified; the Constitution leaves it to Congress to set the number of justices. Under the Judiciary Act of 1789 Congress originally fixed the number of justices at six (one chief justice and five associate justices). Since 1789 Congress has varied the size of the Court from six to seven, nine, ten, and back to nine justices (always including one chief justice).

When the cases in volume 239 were decided the Court comprised the following nine members:

Portrait	Justice	Office	Home State	Succeeded	Date confirmed by the Senate (Vote)	Tenure on Supreme Court
	Edward Douglass White	Chief Justice	Louisiana	Melville Fuller	December 12, 1910 (Acclamation)	December 19, 1910 – May 19, 1921 (Died)
	Joseph McKenna	Associate Justice	California	Stephen Johnson Field	January 21, 1898 (Acclamation)	January 26, 1898 – January 5, 1925 (Retired)
	Oliver Wendell Holmes Jr.	Associate Justice	Massachusetts	Horace Gray	December 4, 1902 (Acclamation)	December 8, 1902 – January 12, 1932 (Retired)
	William R. Day	Associate Justice	Ohio	George Shiras Jr.	February 23, 1903 (Acclamation)	March 2, 1903 – November 13, 1922 (Retired)
	Charles Evans Hughes	Associate Justice	New York	David Josiah Brewer	May 2, 1910 (Acclamation)	October 10, 1910 – June 10, 1916 (Resigned)
	Willis Van Devanter	Associate Justice	Wyoming	Edward Douglass White (as Associate Justice)	December 15, 1910 (Acclamation)	January 3, 1911 – June 2, 1937 (Retired)
	Joseph Rucker Lamar	Associate Justice	Georgia	William Henry Moody	December 15, 1910 (Acclamation)	January 3, 1911 – January 2, 1916 (Died)
	Mahlon Pitney	Associate Justice	New Jersey	John Marshall Harlan	March 13, 1912 (50–26)	March 18, 1912 – December 31, 1922 (Resigned)
	James Clark McReynolds	Associate Justice	Tennessee	Horace Harmon Lurton	August 29, 1914 (44–6)	October 12, 1914 – January 31, 1941 (Retired)

== Notable Case in 239 U.S. ==
=== Hadacheck v. Sebastian ===
Hadacheck v. Sebastian, 239 U.S. 394 (1915), was an early Supreme Court case on the constitutionality of zoning ordinances. The Court held that an ordinance of Los Angeles, California, prohibiting the manufacturing of bricks within specified limits of the city, did not unconstitutionally deprive the petitioner of his property without due process of law, or deny him equal protection of the laws.

== Citation style ==
Under the Judiciary Act of 1789 the federal court structure at the time comprised District Courts, which had general trial jurisdiction; Circuit Courts, which had mixed trial and appellate (from the US District Courts) jurisdiction; and the United States Supreme Court, which had appellate jurisdiction over the federal District and Circuit courts—and for certain issues over state courts. The Supreme Court also had limited original jurisdiction (i.e., in which cases could be filed directly with the Supreme Court without first having been heard by a lower federal or state court). There were one or more federal District Courts and/or Circuit Courts in each state, territory, or other geographical region.

The Judiciary Act of 1891 created the United States Courts of Appeals and reassigned the jurisdiction of most routine appeals from the district and circuit courts to these appellate courts. The Act created nine new courts that were originally known as the "United States Circuit Courts of Appeals." The new courts had jurisdiction over most appeals of lower court decisions. The Supreme Court could review either legal issues that a court of appeals certified or decisions of court of appeals by writ of certiorari. On January 1, 1912, the effective date of the Judicial Code of 1911, the old Circuit Courts were abolished, with their remaining trial court jurisdiction transferred to the U.S. District Courts.

Bluebook citation style is used for case names, citations, and jurisdictions.

- "# Cir." = United States Court of Appeals
  - e.g., "3d Cir." = United States Court of Appeals for the Third Circuit
- "D." = United States District Court for the District of . . .
  - e.g.,"D. Mass." = United States District Court for the District of Massachusetts
- "E." = Eastern; "M." = Middle; "N." = Northern; "S." = Southern; "W." = Western
  - e.g.,"M.D. Ala." = United States District Court for the Middle District of Alabama
- "Ct. Cl." = United States Court of Claims
- The abbreviation of a state's name alone indicates the highest appellate court in that state's judiciary at the time.
  - e.g.,"Pa." = Supreme Court of Pennsylvania
  - e.g.,"Me." = Supreme Judicial Court of Maine

== List of cases in volume 239 U.S. ==
Case Name	Page and year	Opinion of the Court	Concurring opinion(s)	Dissenting opinion(s)	Lower Court	Disposition
Cerecedo v. United States	1 (1915)	White	none	none	D.P.R.	dismissed
Gegiow v. Uhl	3 (1915)	Holmes	none	none	2d Cir.	reversed
Central Trust Company of Illinois v. Lueders	11 (1915)	McReynolds	none	none	6th Cir.	dismissed
Stewart v. City of Kansas City	14 (1915)	McKenna	none	none	Kan.	dismissed
United States Fidelity and Guaranty Company v. Riefler	17 (1915)	Holmes	none	none	7th Cir.	certification
Steinfeld v. Zeckendorf	26 (1915)	Holmes	none	none	Ariz.	affirmed
Manila Investment Company v. Trammell	31 (1915)	Day	none	none	S.D. Fla.	affirmed
Truax v. Raich	33 (1915)	Hughes	none	McReynolds	D. Ariz.	affirmed
Rio Grande Western Railroad Company v. Stringham	44 (1915)	VanDevanter	none	none	Utah	multiple
Briggs v. United Shoe Machinery Company	48 (1915)	VanDevanter	none	none	S.D.N.Y.	affirmed
Pennsylvania Company v. Donat	50 (1915)	McReynolds	none	none	7th Cir.	affirmed
Chicago, Rock Island and Pacific Railroad Co. v. Devine	52 (1915)	White	none	none	Ill.	affirmed
Stratton v. Stratton	55 (1915)	White	none	none	Ohio Dist. Ct. App.	dismissed
City of New York v. Sage	57 (1915)	Holmes	none	none	2d Cir.	reversed
La Roque v. United States	62 (1915)	VanDevanter	none	none	8th Cir.	affirmed
Anderson v. The Forty-Two Broadway Company	69 (1915)	Pitney	none	none	2d Cir.	reversed
United States v. Barnow	74 (1915)	Pitney	none	none	E.D. Pa.	reversed
National Bank of Athens v. Shackelford	81 (1915)	McReynolds	none	none	5th Cir.	affirmed
Parker v. Monroig	83 (1915)	White	none	none	D.P.R.	affirmed
United States v. New York and Porto Rico Steamship Company	88 (1915)	Holmes	none	none	2d Cir.	reversed
Gsell v. Insular Collector of Customs	93 (1915)	Day	none	none	Phil.	dismissed
Southern Railroad Company v. Campbell	99 (1915)	Hughes	none	none	S.C.	affirmed
Provident Savings Life Assurance Society v. Kentucky	103 (1915)	Hughes	none	none	Ky.	reversed
United States v. Freeman	117 (1915)	VanDevanter	none	none	D. Kan.	reversed
Glenwood Light & Water Co. v. Mutual Light, Heat & Power Co.	121 (1915)	Pitney	none	none	D. Colo.	reversed
Morris Canal & Banking Co. v. Baird	126 (1915)	McReynolds	none	none	N.J.	affirmed
Mellon Company v. McCafferty	134 (1915)	White	none	none	Okla.	dismissed
Sui v. McCoy	139 (1915)	White	none	none	Phil.	affirmed
Norton v. Whiteside	144 (1915)	White	none	none	8th Cir.	dismissed
Fireball Gas Tank and Illuminating Company v. Commercial Acetylene Company	156 (1915)	McKenna	none	none	8th Cir.	affirmed
Porter v. Wilson	170 (1915)	McKenna	none	none	Okla.	affirmed
Heim v. McCall	175 (1915)	McKenna	none	none	N.Y.	affirmed
Crane v. New York	195 (1915)	McKenna	none	none	N.Y. Ct. Sp. Sess.	affirmed
Atlantic Coast Line Railroad Co. v. Burnette	199 (1915)	Holmes	none	none	N.C.	reversed
New Orleans-Belize Royal Mail and Central American Steamship Company, Ltd. v. United States	202 (1915)	Holmes	none	none	Ct. Cl.	affirmed
Phillip Wagner, Inc. v. Leser	207 (1915)	Day	none	none	Md.	affirmed
William Cramp and Sons Ship and Engine Building Company v. United States	221 (1915)	Day	none	McKenna	Ct. Cl.	affirmed
Johnson v. Wells Fargo & Co.	234 (1915)	Day	none	none	8th Cir.	affirmed
O'Neill v. Leamer	244 (1915)	Hughes	none	none	Neb.	affirmed
Houck v. Little River Drainage District	254 (1915)	Hughes	none	none	Mo.	affirmed
Bailey v. Baker Ice Machine Company	268 (1915)	VanDevanter	none	none	8th Cir.	affirmed
Phoenix Railroad Company v. Geary	277 (1915)	Pitney	none	none	D. Ariz.	affirmed
Elzaburu v. Chaves	283 (1915)	Pitney	none	none	P.R.	affirmed
De Villanueva v. Villanueva	293 (1915)	White	none	none	Phil.	affirmed
Mackenzie v. Hare	299 (1915)	McKenna	none	none	Cal.	affirmed
Town of Essex v. New England Telegraph Company of Massachusetts	313 (1915)	McReynolds	none	none	D. Mass.	affirmed
Provo Bench Canal and Irrigation Company v. Tanner	323 (1915)	McReynolds	none	none	Utah	affirmed
Weber v. Freed	325 (1915)	White	none	none	D.N.J.	affirmed
Texas and Pacific Railroad Co. v. Bigger	330 (1915)	McKenna	none	none	5th Cir.	affirmed
Atchison, Topeka and Santa Fe Railway Co. v. Swearingen	339 (1915)	Holmes	none	none	5th Cir.	reversed
United States v. Normile	344 (1915)	Holmes	none	none	Ct. Cl.	reversed
Great Northern Railroad Company v. Otos	349 (1915)	Holmes	none	none	Minn.	affirmed
Seaboard Air Line Railroad Co. v. Koennecke	352 (1915)	Holmes	none	none	S.C.	affirmed
Christianson v. King County	356 (1915)	Hughes	none	none	9th Cir.	affirmed
Robert Moody and Son v. Century Savings Bank	374 (1915)	VanDevanter	none	none	8th Cir.	affirmed
Northern Pacific Railroad Co. v. Concannon	382 (1915)	White	none	none	Wash.	reversed
Atlantic Coast Line Railroad Co. v. Glenn	388 (1915)	White	none	none	S.C.	affirmed
Hadacheck v. Sebastian	394 (1915)	McKenna	none	none	Cal.	affirmed
Williams v. Johnson	414 (1915)	McKenna	none	none	Okla.	affirmed
Chicago, Rock Island and Pacific Railroad Company v. Whiteaker	421 (1915)	McKenna	none	none	Mo.	affirmed
Miller v. Strahl	426 (1915)	McKenna	none	none	Neb.	affirmed
Ex parte Uppercu	435 (1915)	Holmes	none	none	D. Mass.	mandamus granted
Bi-Metallic Investment Company v. State Board of Equalization of Colorado	441 (1915)	Holmes	none	none	Colo.	affirmed
Dayton Coal and Iron Company, Ltd. v. Cincinnati, New Orleans and Texas Pacific Railway Company	446 (1915)	Day	none	none	Tenn.	affirmed
Chicago and Alton Railroad Co. v. Wagner	452 (1916)	Hughes	none	none	Ill.	affirmed
Inter-Island Steam Navigation Company v. Byrne	459 (1916)	McReynolds	none	none	Sup. Ct. Terr. Haw.	affirmed
Reese v. Philadelphia and Reading Railroad Company	463 (1915)	McReynolds	none	none	3d Cir.	affirmed
United States v. Hamburg-Amerikanische Packetfahrt-Actien Gesellschaft	466 (1916)	White	none	none	S.D.N.Y.	reversed
Myles Salt Company, Ltd. v. Iberia and St. Mary Drainage District	478 (1916)	McKenna	none	none	La.	reversed
Northwestern Laundry v. City of Des Moines	486 (1916)	Day	none	none	S.D. Iowa	affirmed
Southern Railroad Company v. Lloyd	496 (1916)	Day	none	none	N.C.	affirmed
Hapai v. Brown	502 (1916)	Holmes	none	none	Sup. Ct. Terr. Haw.	affirmed
Hallowell v. Commons	506 (1916)	Holmes	none	none	8th Cir.	affirmed
Seven Cases of Eckmans Alterative v. United States	510 (1916)	Hughes	none	none	D. Neb.	affirmed
Commercial National Bank of New Orleans v. Canal-Louisiana Bank and Trust Company	520 (1916)	Hughes	none	none	5th Cir.	reversed
United States v. Ross	530 (1916)	Hughes	none	none	Ct. Cl.	reversed
Moss v. Ramey	538 (1916)	VanDevanter	none	none	Idaho	affirmed
Chicago, Rock Island and Pacific Railroad Co. v. Wright	548 (1916)	VanDevanter	none	none	Neb.	affirmed
Shanks v. Delaware, Lackawanna and Western Railroad Company	556 (1916)	VanDevanter	none	none	N.Y. Sup. Ct.	affirmed
Interstate Amusement Company v. Albert	560 (1916)	Pitney	none	none	Tenn.	affirmed
Home Bond Company v. McChesney	568 (1916)	Pitney	none	none	6th Cir.	affirmed
Kanawha and Michigan Railroad Company v. Kerse	576 (1916)	Pitney	none	none	W. Va. Cir. Ct.	affirmed
New York Central Railroad Company v. Gray	583 (1916)	Pitney	none	none	N.Y. Sup. Ct.	affirmed
Cleveland, Cincinnati, Chicago and St. Louis Railway Company v. Dettlebach	588 (1916)	Pitney	none	none	Ohio Dist. Ct. App.	reversed
Seaboard Air Line Railroad Company v. Horton	595 (1916)	Pitney	none	none	N.C.	affirmed
Basso v. United States	602 (1916)	McKenna	none	none	Ct. Cl.	affirmed
White v. United States	608 (1916)	Holmes	none	none	Ct. Cl.	affirmed
Northern Pacific Railroad Company v. Meese	614 (1916)	McReynolds	none	none	9th Cir.	reversed
Rogers v. Hennepin County	621 (1916)	McReynolds	none	none	D. Minn.	affirmed
