= List of United States Supreme Court cases, volume 210 =

Supreme Court of the United States
- Interactive map of Supreme Court of the United States
- 38°53′26″N 77°00′16″W
- Established: March 4, 1789; 236 years ago
- Location: Washington, D.C.
- Coordinates: 38°53′26″N 77°00′16″W
- Composition method: Presidential nomination with Senate confirmation
- Authorised by: Constitution of the United States, Art. III, § 1
- Judge term length: life tenure, subject to impeachment and removal
- Number of positions: 9 (by statute)
- Website: supremecourt.gov

This is a list of cases reported in volume 210 of United States Reports, decided by the Supreme Court of the United States in 1908.

== Justices of the Supreme Court at the time of volume 210 U.S. ==
The Supreme Court is established by Article III, Section 1 of the Constitution of the United States, which says: "The judicial Power of the United States, shall be vested in one supreme Court . . .". The size of the Court is not specified; the Constitution leaves it to Congress to set the number of justices. Under the Judiciary Act of 1789 Congress originally fixed the number of justices at six (one chief justice and five associate justices). Since 1789 Congress has varied the size of the Court from six to seven, nine, ten, and back to nine justices (always including one chief justice).

When the cases in volume 210 were decided the Court comprised the following nine members:

Portrait	Justice	Office	Home State	Succeeded	Date confirmed by the Senate (Vote)	Tenure on Supreme Court
	Melville Fuller	Chief Justice	Illinois	Morrison Waite	July 20, 1888 (41–20)	October 8, 1888 – July 4, 1910 (Died)
	John Marshall Harlan	Associate Justice	Kentucky	David Davis	November 29, 1877 (Acclamation)	December 10, 1877 – October 14, 1911 (Died)
	David Josiah Brewer	Associate Justice	Kansas	Stanley Matthews	December 18, 1889 (53–11)	January 6, 1890 – March 28, 1910 (Died)
	Edward Douglass White	Associate Justice	Louisiana	Samuel Blatchford	February 19, 1894 (Acclamation)	March 12, 1894 – December 18, 1910 (Continued as chief justice)
	Rufus W. Peckham	Associate Justice	New York	Howell Edmunds Jackson	December 9, 1895 (Acclamation)	January 6, 1896 – October 24, 1909 (Died)
	Joseph McKenna	Associate Justice	California	Stephen Johnson Field	January 21, 1898 (Acclamation)	January 26, 1898 – January 5, 1925 (Retired)
	Oliver Wendell Holmes Jr.	Associate Justice	Massachusetts	Horace Gray	December 4, 1902 (Acclamation)	December 8, 1902 – January 12, 1932 (Retired)
	William R. Day	Associate Justice	Ohio	George Shiras Jr.	February 23, 1903 (Acclamation)	March 2, 1903 – November 13, 1922 (Retired)
	William Henry Moody	Associate Justice	Massachusetts	Henry Billings Brown	December 12, 1906 (Acclamation)	December 17, 1906 – November 20, 1910 (Retired)

== Citation style ==
Under the Judiciary Act of 1789 the federal court structure at the time comprised District Courts, which had general trial jurisdiction; Circuit Courts, which had mixed trial and appellate (from the US District Courts) jurisdiction; and the United States Supreme Court, which had appellate jurisdiction over the federal District and Circuit courts—and for certain issues over state courts. The Supreme Court also had limited original jurisdiction (i.e., in which cases could be filed directly with the Supreme Court without first having been heard by a lower federal or state court). There were one or more federal District Courts and/or Circuit Courts in each state, territory, or other geographical region.

The Judiciary Act of 1891 created the United States Courts of Appeals and reassigned the jurisdiction of most routine appeals from the district and circuit courts to these appellate courts. The Act created nine new courts that were originally known as the "United States Circuit Courts of Appeals." The new courts had jurisdiction over most appeals of lower court decisions. The Supreme Court could review either legal issues that a court of appeals certified or decisions of court of appeals by writ of certiorari.

Bluebook citation style is used for case names, citations, and jurisdictions.

- "# Cir." = United States Court of Appeals
  - e.g., "3d Cir." = United States Court of Appeals for the Third Circuit
- "C.C.D." = United States Circuit Court for the District of . . .
  - e.g.,"C.C.D.N.J." = United States Circuit Court for the District of New Jersey
- "D." = United States District Court for the District of . . .
  - e.g.,"D. Mass." = United States District Court for the District of Massachusetts
- "E." = Eastern; "M." = Middle; "N." = Northern; "S." = Southern; "W." = Western
  - e.g.,"C.C.S.D.N.Y." = United States Circuit Court for the Southern District of New York
  - e.g.,"M.D. Ala." = United States District Court for the Middle District of Alabama
- "Ct. Cl." = United States Court of Claims
- The abbreviation of a state's name alone indicates the highest appellate court in that state's judiciary at the time.
  - e.g.,"Pa." = Supreme Court of Pennsylvania
  - e.g.,"Me." = Supreme Judicial Court of Maine

== List of cases in volume 210 U.S. ==
Case Name	Page & year	Opinion of the Court	Concurring opinion(s)	Dissenting opinion(s)	Lower Court	Disposition
Empire State Cattle Co. v. Atchison et al. R.R. Co.	1 (1908)	White	none	none	8th Cir.	affirmed
St. Paul et al. R.R. Co. v. Donohue	21 (1908)	White	none	none	Minn.	affirmed
Gazlay v. Williams	41 (1908)	Fuller	none	none	6th Cir.	affirmed
Quick Bear v. Leupp	50 (1908)	Fuller	none	none	D.C. Cir.	affirmed
Brown v. Fletcher's Estate	82 (1908)	Brewer	none	none	Mich.	affirmed
La Bourgogne	95 (1908)	White	none	none	2d Cir.	affirmed
Farrell v. Lockhart	142 (1908)	White	none	none	Utah	reversed
Kealoha v. Castle	149 (1908)	White	none	none	Sup. Ct. Terr. Haw.	affirmed
Boston & M.R.R. Co. v. Gokey	155 (1908)	Peckham	none	none	2d Cir.	affirmed
Sanderson v. United States	168 (1908)	Peckham	none	none	Ct. Cl.	affirmed
Cleveland et al. R.R. Co. v. Porter	177 (1908)	McKenna	none	none	Ind. App.	affirmed
Mobile et al. R.R. Co. v. Mississippi	187 (1908)	McKenna	none	none	Miss.	affirmed
Old Dominion et al. Co. v. Lewisohn	206 (1908)	Holmes	none	none	2d Cir.	affirmed
Galveston et al. R.R. Co. v. Texas	217 (1908)	Holmes	none	Harlan	Tex.	reversed
Fauntleroy v. Lum	230 (1908)	Holmes	none	White	Miss.	reversed
In re Wood	246 (1908)	Day	none	Brewer	8th Cir.	certification
City of St. Louis v. United Rys. Co.	266 (1908)	Day	none	none	C.C.E.D. Mo.	reversed
St. Louis et al. R.R. Co. v. Taylor	281 (1908)	Moody	none	none	Ark.	reversed
Municipality of Ponce v. Roman C.C.	296 (1908)	Fuller	none	none	P.R.	affirmed
Delmar Jockey Club v. Missouri	324 (1908)	White	none	none	Mo.	dismissed
Kansas City N.R.R. Co. v. Zimmerman	336 (1908)	Holmes	none	none	C.C.D. Kan.	dismissed
Bobbs-Merrill Co. v. Straus	339 (1908)	Day	none	none	2d Cir.	affirmed
Scribner v. Straus	352 (1908)	Day	none	none	2d Cir.	affirmed
Globe Newspaper Co. v. Walker	356 (1908)	Day	none	none	C.C.D. Mass.	reversed
Western Loan & Sav. Co. v. Butte & B.C.M. Co.	368 (1908)	Day	none	none	C.C.D. Mont.	reversed
Londoner v. City and County of Denver	373 (1908)	Moody	none	none	Colo.	reversed
Pierce v. Creecy	387 (1908)	Moody	none	none	C.C.E.D. Mo.	affirmed
Consolidated P.B. Co. v. Eastern P.B. Co.	405 (1908)	McKenna	none	Harlan	1st Cir.	affirmed

== See also ==
- Certificate of division
