= Glenwood Light & Water Co. v. Mutual Light, Heat & Power Co. =

- Supreme Court of the United States

Decided November 15, 1915
- Full case name: Glenwood Light & Water Co. v. Mutual Light, Heat & Power Co.
- Citations: 239 U.S. 121 (more)

Holding
- A plaintiff can satisfy the amount-in-controversy requirement for diversity jurisdiction by seeking non-monetary relief if the value of that relief satisfies the requirement.

Court membership
- Chief Justice Edward D. White Associate Justices Joseph McKenna · Oliver W. Holmes Jr. William R. Day · Charles E. Hughes; Willis Van Devanter · Joseph R. Lamar; Mahlon Pitney · James C. McReynolds

Glenwood Light & Water Co. v. Mutual Light, Heat & Power Co., 239 U.S. 121 (1915), was a United States Supreme Court case in which the court held that a plaintiff can satisfy the amount-in-controversy requirement for diversity jurisdiction by seeking non-monetary relief if the value of that relief satisfies the requirement. For instance, an injunction estimated to cost $75,000 would satisfy the requirement.
