= Truax v. Raich =

1915 US Supreme Court case

- Supreme Court of the United States

Argued October 15, 1915 Decided November 1, 1915
- Full case name: Truax v. Raich
- Citations: 239 U.S. 33 (more)

Holding
- State statutes may not limit the number of aliens that a private business may employ.

Court membership
- Chief Justice Edward D. White Associate Justices Joseph McKenna · Oliver W. Holmes Jr. William R. Day · Charles E. Hughes; Willis Van Devanter · Joseph R. Lamar; Mahlon Pitney · James C. McReynolds

Case opinions
- Majority: Hughes, joined by White, McKenna, Holmes, Day, Van Devanter, Lamar, and Pitney
- Dissent: McReynolds

Truax v. Raich 239 US 33 (1915) was a United States Supreme Court case concerning U.S. labor laws, the right to work, immigration law, and the Fourteenth Amendment to the United States Constitution.

== Statute ==
In 1914, the state of Arizona adopted a new provision to Art. IV, § 1 to the Arizona State Constitution. The provision entitled, “An act to protect the citizens of the United States in their employment against noncitizens of the United States, in Arizona, and to provide penalties and punishment for the violation thereof,” instated a quota system for employers within Arizona. SEC. 1 of this provision required employers with more than five workers at any given time ensure a minimum of 80% of their employers be native-born American citizens. SEC. 2 provided that a violation of this act would result in a $100 fine and thirty days of imprisonment levied against the employer and SEC. 3 said that a $100 fine and thirty days of imprisonment would be imposed upon any non-citizen or immigrant that lies about their place of birth or citizenship to a potential employer.

This provision was introduced under the assumption that "the employment of aliens unless restrained was a peril to the public welfare."

== Facts ==
Mike Raich was an Austrian citizen who immigrated to the United States and settled in Arizona. He was employed by William Truax Sr., at a local bakery in Bisbee, Arizona, and began work at that establishment before the 1914 law was ratified and imposed. Upon imposition, Raich was informed by Truax that his employment would be terminated, “solely by reason of [the law’s] requirements and because of the fear of the penalties that would be incurred in case of its violation."

On December 15, 1914, Raich filed suit in the United States District Court for the District of Arizona, arguing that the imposition of the 80% native-born employee requirement denied him the right to work and equal protection under the law, therefore violating the Fourteenth Amendment of the U.S. Constitution.

After Raich’s filing, the defendants of the case (William Truax Sr., the Arizona attorney general Wiley E. Jones, and the Cochise County attorney W. G. Gilmore) joined in a motion to dismiss the case over the following grounds:

- The lawsuit was levied against the State of Arizona without consent
- The lawsuit sought to enjoin the enforcement of a criminal statute
- The bill did not state facts sufficient to constitute a cause of action in equity
- There was an improper joinder of parties, and the plaintiff was not entitled to sue for the relief asked

This motion of dismissal was heard and then denied by three judges before being taken up by the U.S. Supreme Court. While typically civil and criminal court cases and heard and dealt with differently, it was said that “a court of equity... may, when such action is essential to the safeguarding of property -rights, restrain criminal prosecutions under unconstitutional statutes”.

== Judgment ==
The Court held, in a vote of 8 to 1, that Arizona was in violation of the Equal Protection Clause of the Fourteenth Amendment. Justice Charles Evans Hughes delivered the majority opinion on Truax, stating the “right to work for a living in the common occupations of the community is of the very essence of the personal freedom and opportunity that it was the purpose of the Fourteenth Amendment to secure.”

The ruling drew precedent from previous cases of similar theme. The 1886 Supreme Court saw the case of Yick Wo v. Hopkins, an earlier suit concerning immigrants and the Fourteenth Amendment. The Court decided in favor of Yick Wo and Wo Lee’s rights under the Equal Protection Clause, and Justice Stanley Matthews’ opinion stated, “'These provisions, are universal in their application, to all persons within the territorial jurisdiction, without regard to any differences of race, of color, or of nationality; and the equal protection of the laws is a pledge of the protection of equal laws.’”

In Truax v. Raich, the 1915 Court held that:

- The state of Arizona’s statute violated Congressional plenary power when it came to regulating topics surrounding immigration.
  - “The power to control immigration -- to admit or exclude aliens -- is vested solely in the Federal Government, and the States may not deprive aliens so admitted of the right to earn a livelihood, as that would be tantamount to denying their entrance and abode.”
- The state of Arizona’s statute violated the Equal Protection Clause of the Fourteenth Amendment
  - “Whether the statute of Arizona attempting to regulate employment of aliens is void as conflicting with rights of aliens under treaties with their respective nations not determined in this case, as the statute is held unconstitutional under the equal protection provision of the Fourteenth Amendment.”

Justice James Clark McReynolds offered a single dissenting opinion to the Truax decision. He viewed the lawsuit as “a suit against a state, to which the 11th Amendment declares 'the judicial power of the United States shall not be construed to extend.'”

== See also ==
- United States v. Wong Kim Ark
- Yick Wo v. Hopkins
- Wong Wing v. United States
