= Regulatory state =

The term regulatory state refers to the expansion in the use of rulemaking, monitoring and enforcement techniques and institutions by the state and to a parallel change in the way its positive or negative functions in society are being carried out. The expansion of the state nowadays is generally via regulation and less via taxing and spending. The notion of the regulatory state is increasingly more attractive for theoreticians of the state with the growth in the use and application of rule making, monitoring and enforcement strategies and with the parallel growth of civil regulation and business regulation.

The rise of the regulatory state in the Industrial Revolution can be traced to network regulation first instituted by British Prime Minister William Gladstone in 1844. The co-expansion of state, civil and business regulation in the domestic and transnational arenas suggest that the notions of regulatory governance and regulatory capitalism are as useful theoretically as the notion of regulatory state.

The role of individual states in regulating social and political life taking account of local circumstances is highlighted by Pope Francis in his 2015 encyclical letter, Laudato si':

Attempts to resolve all problems through uniform regulations or technical interventions can lead to overlooking the complexities of local problems ...

== See also ==
- Administrative state
