= Regulatory capitalism =

Form of capitalism

Regulatory capitalism suggests that the operation maintenance and development of the international political economy increasingly depends on administrative rules outside the legislatures and the courts. In other words, it tells us that capitalism is a regulatory institution – one that is being constituted, shaped, constrained and expanded as a historically woven patchwork of regulatory institutions, strategies, and functions.

Although this patchwork varies widely across regions, nations, regimes, sectors, issues, and arenas, the general trend despite and beyond the process of liberalization is that of growth rather than decline of the role regulation in shaping policy and politics. Regulatory capitalism claims that the capitalist system was built, cultivated, and controlled by regulation and that demand for regulation is in fact generated by capitalism.

Deregulation may represent trends in some industries (notably finance), but more regulation is the general trend beyond that characterize modern and post-modern capitalism alike. Regulation, which refers to rule making and rule enforcement, is in this interpretation an instrument of organizations—states, business, civil and hybrid and is carried at all political arenas and levels.

The concept of regulatory capitalism serves as an alternative to concepts like financial capitalism, welfare capitalism, casino capitalism, developmental capitalism, risk capitalism, state capitalism and crony capitalism in an attempt to shed more light on capitalism as a polymorphous order. It builds on and extends the observations on the rise of a particular form of state–the regulatory state–and social governance via rule making, rule monitoring and rule enforcement.

== Origins of regulatory capitalism ==
When looking for the origins of regulatory capitalism, the development of capitalism as an order of economic allocation has to be first studied. The maturity of capitalism in this sense was reached during the nineteenth century. The main factors that contributed to its expansion include British hegemony in the nineteenth century, the social and economic implications of the Industrial Revolution, and the global echoes of the French Revolution. Moreover, the crisis of the interwar period as well as the process of democratic enfranchisement enabled a shift towards an increased role of the state, which in many domains took over two major functions of governance previously dominated by business – steering (leading, thinking, directing, guiding) and rowing (enterprise, service provision). In regulatory capitalism, the role of steering is occupied by the state, while the functions of service provision and technological innovation are performed by business.

In the 1990s it became more evident that while the state attempted to get rid of running things, it started to regulate more of them instead. At the same time, the regulation expenses of the state soared, incentivising the analysts to talk about the state as a regulatory state. Moreover, many non-state actors, particularly the executive actors beyond the state, started to regulate other organizations more. The term 'regulatory society' was developed. Some researchers pointed out that the markets had become more vibrant at the same time as the regulation of the markets increased. That led to the creation of the term 'regulatory capitalism', which connected the terms 'regulatory state' and 'regulatory society' to the simultaneous rapid development of the capitalist system.

One of the first books that attempted to capture how the regulatory capitalism globalized through a variety of mechanisms such as modelling was the book Global Business Regulation by Braithwaite and Drahos, published in 2000.

== See also ==
- Economic interventionism
- Mixed economy
- Regulated market
- Regulatory capture
- Regulatory economics
- Regulatory state
- Social democracy
- Economic democracy
- Democratic socialism

== Bibliography ==
- David Levi-Faur and Jacint Jordana Eds, The Rise of Regulatory Capitalism: The Global Diffusion of a New Order, The Annals of the American Academy of Political and Social Science Series.
- J. Braithwaite, Regulatory Capitalism: How it Works, Ideas for Making it Work Better, Cheltenham, Edward Elgar, 2008.
