= Globe Newspaper Co. v. Walker =

- Supreme Court of the United States

Argued April 23, 1908 Decided June 1, 1908
- Full case name: Globe Newspaper Co. v. Walker
- Citations: 210 U.S. 356 (more) 28 S. Ct. 726; 52 L. Ed. 1096

Holding
- Because Congress has provided a remedy for those whose copyrights in maps are infringed, a civil action at common law for money damages cannot be maintained against the infringers.

Court membership
- Chief Justice Melville Fuller Associate Justices John M. Harlan · David J. Brewer; Edward D. White · Rufus W. Peckham; Joseph McKenna · Oliver W. Holmes Jr. William R. Day · William H. Moody

Case opinion
- Majority: Day, joined by unanimous

Globe Newspaper Co. v. Walker, 210 U.S. 356 (1908), was a United States Supreme Court case in which the Court held that, because Congress has provided a remedy for those whose copyrights in maps are infringed, a civil action at common law for money damages cannot be maintained against the infringers.
