= Administrative state =

Legal concept of government function

The administrative state is a term used to describe the power that some government agencies have to write, judge, and enforce their own laws. Since it pertains to the structure and function of government, it is a frequent topic in political science, constitutional law, and public administration.

The phenomenon was relatively unknown in representative democracies before the end of the 1800s. Its sudden rise has generated considerable scholarship, writing, and study to understand its causes and effects, and to square it with previous notions of law and governance.

== Delegation of law-making ==
The administrative state is created when legislative (law-making) bodies, like the U.S. Congress or the U.K. Parliament, delegate their lawmaking powers to administrative or private entities.

Nondelegation is a legal principle that a branch of government cannot authorize another entity to exercise powers or functions assigned to itself. It is sometimes used to argue that the power of administrative agencies to write laws is unconstitutional, illegal, or otherwise invalid, or that it imposes restrictions on administrative agencies in their exercise of these powers.

== Judicial deference ==
The second power of the administrative state comes from judicial deference. In technical terminology, judicial deference is a standard of judicial review that applies when a court defers to an agency's interpretation of a law. Sometimes the law is made by the legislature, and sometimes by the agency itself.

In other words, the agency exercises the same ability of a court to judge and interpret laws. These interpretations bind other courts to arrive at the same interpretation, as long as the interpretation is reasonable, even if an independent court would have arrived at a different interpretation.

This ceding of judicial authority to unelected bodies is the source of considerable scholarship. The power of the administrative state is related to the concept of a privative clause, which also restricts a courts ability to interpret law. While continental civil law systems tend to constrain administrative power through the notion of Rechtsstaat, or a system or rules, common law jurisdictions tend to rely only judicial oversight.

== Law enforcement ==
Many administrative agencies are authorized to enforce their own rules, as well as those of the legislature. This includes the power to issue commands to police, or maintain their own separate police forces.

=== Administrative orders ===
Many agencies have the power to issue commands to police, much like a court order. For example, the BBFC, a British agency with the power to allow or ban films, can issue an order to a "Trade Standards enforcement officer" to seize banned films, but they cannot arrest people. By contrast, the Chinese GAPP can issue decrees to seize banned books, films, writing, or other media, as well as arrest and imprison criminal violations of publication regulations.

=== Police and security forces ===
Many administrative agencies operate their own police forces, with the power to arrest, search, seize items, surveil citizens, and jail them for a period before trial. These police go by a variety of names, including special agents or peace officers in the U.S., enforcement command or "officer with constabulary power" in the U.K., general terms like "officers", civilian police, and specialized terms like les douaniers for French Customs.

== Procedural rights ==
Procedural rights pertain to discussions surrounding individual due process and the position individuals hold in administrative agency adjudications and enforcement measures. These rights also extend to the public's ability to engage in agency rule formulation and decision-making events.

The extent to which administrative due process and procedural rights should be protected within the administrative state remains a contentious issue among policy experts. This discourse largely revolves around differing views on constitutional and statutory obligations related to due process and procedural rights, as well as the extent of these protections when citizens engage with administrative entities.

== Structure, authority and control ==
Although most administrative bodies reside within the executive branch, some are set up as independent entities or fall under the legislative or judicial branches. Such organizational differences influence both the supervision of these agencies and their cross-branch interactions.

=== Executive control ===
The most common power arrangement is control by the executive. This is the case in the United States, where almost all administrative agencies are controlled by the executive.

In this case, leaders of administrative agencies can be removed and reappointed by the executive, but there may be laws that make it difficult or impossible for the executive to fire or restructure the entire agency.

=== Civil service control ===
Leaders of administrative agencies can be directly appointed by the civil service bureaucracy.

This is more common in countries with a powerful civil service, like the United Kingdom; for example, the leadership of Ofcom, Ofqual, and Ofsted are all appointed by the Secretaries of State, career civil servants not elected but promoted from within the civil service's own bureaucracy.

=== Self-regulatory organizations ===
Self-regulatory agencies are controlled by members of the private industries they are supposed to regulate. They are typically professional bodies. Examples include the U.S. Financial Industry Regulatory Authority (FINRA), the U.K. Financial Conduct Authority (FCA), the American Medical Association (AMA), medical specialities such as the American Board of Internal Medicine (ABIM), the U.K. Nursing and Midwifery Council (NMC), and the Institute of Chartered Accountants in England and Wales. They are typically authorized by special laws that name them as representatives and regulators of their industry.

In this case, leaders of the organization are appointed by professionals, corporations, or other authorized private entities.

=== Directorate control ===
The European Commission is more complicated, and controlled via a directorial system, that is, the president is chosen by the 27 heads of state or government of the European member countries, and confirmed by the European Parliament. The president chooses commissioners to head directorates-general, analogous to ministers at the head of ministries or U.S. cabinet secretaries of executive departments. In the U.S., the legislature writes laws which can be vetoed by the executive, and the veto can be overridden by a two-thirds vote of the legislature. In the E.U., it is reversed: the president writes laws that the European Parliament can veto, but parliament cannot write its own laws, giving the president of the commission legislative power, right of initiative, and an absolute veto over the will of parliament. The European Commission further exercises lawmaking ability directly without parliamentary approval through implementing and delegated acts.

=== Agency-controlled agencies ===
Sometimes, administrative agencies can themselves create other administrative agencies with delegated lawmaking ability; for example, U.S. Congress authorizes the SEC to make 'regulations', and the SEC authorized the self-regulatory organization FINRA to make 'rules', through a process known as "registration". Unlike the SEC, which can make rules at will, FINRA must have their rules approved by the SEC. Laws, regulations, and rules, are all binding on members of the financial industry; however, FINRA rulebreaking is never criminal and thus can not result in jail time.

=== By country ===
==== United States ====
Political connotations of terms used in American politics to refer to government workers.

In the United States, almost all federal agencies are ultimately accountable to the executive, and the heads of the agencies can be removed and reappointed at the will of the president.

==== United Kingdom ====
In the U.K., there is an abundance of terminology to describe U.K. governmental and semi-governmental agencies, including executive ministries, non-ministerial government departments (NMGD), non-departmental public body (NDPD), and quango, originally short for "quasi-autonomous non-governmental organization", but which are in fact partly controlled or financed by the government.

== Laws, codes, regulations and rules ==
Laws made by administrative agencies are typically distinguished from laws written by the legislature, and given a separate term like "regulations" or "rules", or referred to in codified form as "codes".

In the U.S., federal regulations are codified into the U.S. Code of Federal Regulations (CFR), a complement to the compilation of all laws, the U.S. Code (USC). Administrative regulations comprise 242 volumes and more than 185,000 pages, four times larger than the U.S. Code of Laws.

== History ==
Historian Francis Fukuyama traces the concept of a modern administrative state with merit-based hiring to the French Revolution.

In the mid-1800s in the United Kingdom, increased trade activity, rising population, and migration into larger and larger urban hubs caused the social structures that held together traditional administrative arrangements to disintegrate. Urban growth frequently posed the biggest challenges in regions where local administration was least effective. Reflecting on Manchester in 1835, Alexis de Tocqueville observed that "everything in the exterior appearance of the city attests the individual powers of man; nothing the directing powers of society".

Political scientist Ronald J. Pestritto traces U.S. administrative state practices to the Progressive Era and argues that the administrative state runs counter to the U.S. Constitution: "The strong Progressive belief in the enlightenment and disinterestedness of administrators stands as an instructive contrast to the permanent self-interestedness that the Framers of the U.S. Constitution saw in human nature." Pestritto also adds: "This is not to suggest that the Framers denied discretionary power to the national government . . . Rather, they understood that such discretion had to be channeled through the forms and law of the Constitution in order to be safe for liberty." In 1887, the U.S. Congress established its first independent agency, the Interstate Commerce Commission, to regulate railroads.

Pestritto also identifies Woodrow Wilson and Frank Johnson Goodnow as highly influential advocates of administrative law; Wilson was the 26th President of the United States, and Goodnow was founding president of the American Political Science Association. "Like Wilson, Goodnow argued that government needed to adjust its very purpose and organization to accommodate modern necessities," writes Pestritto.

In 1926, future Supreme Court Justice Felix Frankfurter described the process by which government agencies were effectively writing laws, and characterized it as the most important development in law in his time:

The widening area of what in effect is law-making authority, exercised by officials whose actions are not subject to ordinary court review, constitutes perhaps the most striking contemporary tendency of the Anglo-American legal order...These administrative complements are euphemistically called “filling in the details” of a policy set forth in statutes. But the “details” are of the essence...The control of banking, insurance, public utilities, finance, industry, the professions, health and morals, in sum, the manifold response of government to the forces and needs of modern society, is building up a body of laws not written by legislatures, and of adjudications not made by courts and not subject to their revision. These powers are lodged in a vast congeries of agencies. We are in the midst of a process, largely unconscious and certainly unscientific, of adjusting the exercise of these powers to the traditional system of Anglo-American law.

In 1932, the U.S. Supreme Court, in Crowell v. Benson, confirmed the legality of agency decision-making processes, emphasizing the role of agencies in relation to federal courts before the implementation of the Administrative Procedure Act.

In 1935, through the case Humphrey's Executor v. United States, the court characterized independent federal agencies as having both legislative and judicial aspects. The ruling also highlighted the protections these agencies have against presidential removal.

In 1946, the Administrative Procedure Act was introduced by Congress, providing a standard set of guidelines for federal agency decision-making and regulatory actions. This Act detailed both official and unofficial procedures.

"The shift to a more modern administrative state was accompanied by an enormous growth in the size of government during the middle decades of the twentieth century," wrote Fukuyama in 2014.

In 1973, the U.S. Supreme Court, in United States v. Florida East Coast Railway Co., determined that formal procedures are only necessary for agencies if a law mandates a specific type of hearing. This decision led to a rise in the use of less strict processes.

In 1978, with the case Vermont Yankee Nuclear Power Corp. v. Natural Resources Defense Council, the court ruled that judicial bodies cannot dictate extra procedural stipulations to agencies, nor can they nullify agency actions purely based on their disagreement with the outcome.

In 2000, in the case of Appalachian Power Company v. Environmental Protection Agency, the court mandated the EPA to withdraw a guidance document that brought about a regulatory alteration without adhering to mandatory regulatory procedures.

In 2020, in Seila Law v. Consumer Financial Protection Bureau, the Supreme Court determined that limitations on the president's authority to dismiss singular leaders of independent federal agencies, in contrast to groups, infringe upon the separation of powers doctrine by curtailing executive oversight of such institutions.

== Supra- and subnational administrative states ==
While common examples of the administrative state are national legislatures delegating lawmaking power to national agencies, there are notable examples of entities within countries and supra-national entities creating administrative states.

The European Union has administrative agencies, often referred to as "bodies" or "agencies," which possess the authority to make specific types of regulations or decisions separate from the primary legislative institutions, the European Parliament and the Council of the European Union. Since EU laws are made by the authority vested in the EU from various treaties ("primary law"), the law that the EU makes can be understood as secondary legislation.

U.S. states have separate sovereignty with independent legislatures that can create agencies with the power to write law, decide cases, and enforce laws through their own police. Examples include the California Department of Alcoholic Beverage Control, whose peace officers have the power to arrest, and the Alaska Department of Environmental Conservation.

The administrative state of countries-within-countries, like Scotland, Wales, or Northern Ireland, can be seen as national or subnational agencies, like the Scottish Environment Protection Agency.

The U.S. Bureau of Indian Affairs administers the territory of semi-sovereign Indian tribes, subnational entities with nation-like characteristics.

== Notable examples ==
A third of land in the United States is owned by administrative agencies.

Nearly a third the total landmass of the United States is owned by federal agencies, like the BLM, NPS, and NFS, which all maintain separate police forces to enforce laws and determine the use of the land.

In Italy, special Guardie Zoofile rescue animals in distress or protect them in wildlife; these guards are volunteer, private citizens of environmental and animal associations, authorized with the force of the functions and qualifications of the judicial police in animal-welfare matters by Italian law. This power does not include hunting matters. Thus, environmental clubs function as quasi-governmental entities with law enforcement powers delegated by the government.

=== Common examples of police powers ===
Not all administrative agencies maintain their own police; however, there are notable categories of agency that tend to maintain separate security forces.

Tax agencies commonly employ their own police, like the U.S. IRS Criminal Investigation and the Federal Tax Police Service of the Russian Federation. In the U.K., HMRC employs police to carry out uniformed (e.g. combatting misuse of red diesel) and investigative work (in the Criminal Investigation Branch). They exercise the powers granted under the Customs Management Acts and the Police and Criminal Evidence Act 1984, including arrest, search and detention of people and goods.

Immigration agencies also commonly employ their own police, like the U.S. CBP and ICE, the U.K. Border Force and Immigration Enforcement, the Russian Main Directorate for Migration Affairs, and the Indian Bureau of Immigration. These police typically enforce border checkpoints and deport unauthorized foreign nationals within the country.

Environmental agencies employ police, like the Special Agents of the U.S. EPA, the U.K. Environment Agency, Australia's RPNSA, and South Africa's CapeNature Biodiversity Crime Unit. Common activities include stopping pollution criminal violations of environmental law. In Italy, special Guardie Zoofile, volunteers with police powers, rescue animals in distress and protect them in wildlife.

Government land agencies employ police on government lands, like the French National Forests Office, the U.S. Bureau of Land Management, the Australian Fisheries Management Authority. In the Central African Republic, France helped set up special forest rangers and hunting guards for government land management.

Labor agencies employ police, like the U.K. GLAA, the U.S. Department of Labor, and Singapore's Ministry of Manpower. They typically enforce criminal violations of labor law, like the abuse of workers.

Financial agencies employ police with the power of arrest, like Nigeria's Economic and Financial Crimes Commission, U.S. SEC Division of Enforcement. Since financial crimes often includes corruption, in which lawmakers or the police can be involved, financial crime enforcement is sometimes separated.

== See also ==
- Administrative history
- Constitutional Law
- Regulatory state
