= Bobbs-Merrill Co. v. Straus =

- Supreme Court of the United States

Argued March 12–13, 1908 Decided June 1, 1908
- Full case name: Bobbs-Merrill Company v. Straus, et al. doing business as R.H. Macy & Company
- Citations: 210 U.S. 339 (more) 28 S. Ct. 722; 52 L. Ed. 1086; 1908 U.S. LEXIS 1513; 6 Ohio L. Rep. 323

Case history
- Prior: Judgment for defendants, 139 F. 155 (S.D.N.Y. 1905); affirmed, 147 F. 15 (2nd Cir. 1906)
- Subsequent: None

Holding
- Copyright holders did not have the statutory right to control the price of subsequent resales of lawfully purchased copies of their work. Second Circuit affirmed.

Court membership
- Chief Justice Melville Fuller Associate Justices John M. Harlan · David J. Brewer; Edward D. White · Rufus W. Peckham; Joseph McKenna · Oliver W. Holmes Jr. William R. Day · William H. Moody

Case opinion
- Majority: Day, joined by unanimous

Laws applied
- U.S. Rev. Stat. §§ 4952, 4965, 4970 (Copyright Act of 1897)

Bobbs-Merrill Co. v. Straus, 210 U.S. 339 (1908), was a United States Supreme Court decision concerning the scope of rights accorded owners of a copyright versus owners of a particular copy of a copyrighted work. This was a case of first impression concerning whether the copyright laws permit an owner to control a purchaser's subsequent sale of a copyrighted work. The court stated the issue as:

Does the sole right to vend (named in 4952) secure to the owner of the copyright the right, after a sale of the book to a purchaser, to restrict future sales of the book at retail, to the right to sell it at a certain price per copy, because of a notice in the book that a sale at a different price will be treated as an infringement, which notice has been brought home to one undertaking to sell for less than the named sum?

The case centered on the publisher setting additional terms not specifically stated in the statute and claiming that the work was licensed and not sold. The Court's ruling established what came to be known as the "first-sale doctrine", which was later codified as § 109(a) of the Copyright Act of 1976.

== Facts ==
Bobbs-Merrill Company sold a copyrighted novel, The Castaway by Hallie Erminie Rives, with the notice, "The price of this book at retail is $1 net. No dealer is licensed to sell it at a lower price, and a sale at a lower price will be treated as an infringement of the copyright" printed immediately below the copyright notice. The defendants, Isidor and Nathan Straus representing R.H. Macy & Co., purchased large lots of books at wholesale and sold copies of the book at retail at the price of 89 cents a copy.

== Holding ==
The court held first that the copyright statutes protect an owner's right to "multiply and sell" the work on their own terms. The statutory right to sell, however, did not also create a right to limit resale.

The court did not hold that a contract or license imposed on the first sale could not create an obligation. In this case, there was no contract between the owner and the original purchaser, and there was not privity of contract between the owner and any third party.

== See also ==
- Quality King Distributors, Inc. v. Lanza Research Intl, 523 U.S. 135 (1998)
- Bauer & Cie. v. O'Donnell, a similar ruling regarding patents
- List of United States Supreme Court cases, volume 210
