= United States v. Florida East Coast Railway Co. =

- Supreme Court of the United States

Argued December 7, 1972 Decided January 22, 1973
- Full case name: United States, et al. v. Florida East Coast Railway Co., et al.
- Citations: 410 U.S. 224 (more) 93 S. Ct. 810; 35 L. Ed. 2d 223; 1973 U.S. LEXIS 137

Court membership
- Chief Justice Warren E. Burger Associate Justices William O. Douglas · William J. Brennan Jr. Potter Stewart · Byron White; Thurgood Marshall · Harry Blackmun; Lewis F. Powell Jr. · William Rehnquist

Case opinions
- Majority: Rehnquist, joined by Burger, Brennan, White, Marshall, Blackmun
- Dissent: Douglas, joined by Stewart
- Powell took no part in the consideration or decision of the case.

Laws applied
- Administrative Procedure Act, 5 U.S.C. Sec. 556(d), Interstate Commerce Act

United States v. Florida East Coast Railway Co., 410 U.S. 224 (1973), was a case decided by the United States Supreme Court.

Due to a chronic freight car shortage, Congress had enlarged the scope of the Interstate Commerce Commission's authority to prescribe per diem rate charges for the use of one company's freight car by another, thus giving an incentive to each company to use the cars more efficiently or to acquire more freight cars. The commission, in passing the regulation, had allowed railroads 60 days to file statements of position on the matter. The commission had said: "that any party requesting oral hearing shall set forth with specificity the need therefore and the evidence to be adduced." Several railroads filed statements requesting oral hearings, but the Commission did not hold further hearings and overruled the requests.

Two railroad companies brought an action in the Middle District of Florida to set aside the per diem rates that had been established because they had only been allowed to make written submissions during "hearings" for the proposed rule and not oral arguments. The District Court found that the Interstate Commerce Act required that the Interstate Commerce Commission act in accordance with Administrative Procedure Act, 5 U.S.C. Sec. 556(d), which required that parties would not be "prejudiced" by an agency's decision to receive all submissions of evidence in written form.

The Supreme Court reversed the District Court's decision. Justice Rehnquist delivered the opinion, explaining that Section 1(14)(a) of the Interstate Commerce Act which had enlarged the commission's authority to pass regulations "after hearing" was not a requirement that the ICC allow oral arguments in its rulemaking proceedings and that the hearing requirement had been met.

The Court distinguished between administrative rulemaking and administrative adjudications. Since there had been no effort to single out a particular railroad, the court found the agency's action was of a legislative type judgment as opposed to an adjudication which could entail due process hearing rights.

The Court referred to its decision in Bi-Metallic Investment Co. v. State Board of Equalization in which it held that no hearing at all was constitutionally required before a decision by state tax officers in Colorado to increase the valuation of all taxable property in Denver by a substantial amount.

Justice Douglas joined by Justice Stewart dissented finding that the Railroads had not been afforded hearings guaranteed by Section 1(14)(a) of the Interstate Commerce Act and 5 U.S.C. Sections 553, 556, and 557.
