= Bowen v. Georgetown University Hospital =

United States Supreme Court case

- Supreme Court of the United States

Argued October 11, 1988 Decided December 12, 1988
- Full case name: Otis R. Bowen, Secretary of Health and Human Services v. Georgetown University Hospital, et al.
- Docket no.: 87-1097
- Citations: 488 U.S. 204 (more) 109 S. Ct. 468; 102 L. Ed. 2d 493; 1988 U.S. LEXIS 5554; 57 U.S.L.W.4057
- Decision: Opinion

Case history
- Prior: Judgment for plaintiff hospitals, 698 F. Supp. 290 (D.D.C. 1987); affirmed, 821 F.2d 750 (D.C. Cir. 1987); certiorari granted, 485 U.S. 903 (1988).

Holding
- The cost-limit rule imposed by the Secretary of Health and Human Services is invalid because statutory grants of rulemaking authority should not be read to authorize the promulgation of retroactive rules unless expressly conveyed.

Court membership
- Chief Justice William Rehnquist Associate Justices William J. Brennan Jr. · Byron White; Thurgood Marshall · Harry Blackmun; John P. Stevens · Sandra Day O'Connor; Antonin Scalia · Anthony Kennedy

Case opinions
- Majority: Kennedy, joined by unanimous
- Concurrence: Scalia

Laws applied
- Medicare Act; Administrative Procedure Act

Bowen v. Georgetown University Hospital, 488 U.S. 204 (1988), was a case in which the United States Supreme Court held that agencies should not be presumed to have the power to promulgate retroactive rules unless that power is expressly authorized by Congress. Justice Anthony Kennedy wrote for a unanimous court that the Secretary of Health and Human Services had exceeded his rulemaking authority under the Medicare Act in promulgating a wage index rule in 1984 under which he would recoup Medicare reimbursements paid to hospitals, including Georgetown University Hospital, that had been disbursed since 1981 according to the pre-1984 rule. Justice Antonin Scalia authored a concurring opinion, writing separately that, in addition to the particular language of the Medicare Act, the Administrative Procedure Act more broadly prohibits retroactive rulemaking because it defines rules as having exclusively future effect, as opposed to adjudicative orders.

== Background ==
=== Wage index rule ===
Title XVIII of the Social Security Act, as amended in 1965 by the "Medicare Act," established Medicare, in which the federal government reimburses medical providers for services rendered to Medicare beneficiaries. Section 223(b) of the 1972 amendment to the Social Security Act authorized the Secretary of Health and Human Services to create "cost-limit" rules, and the first such rules were promulgated in 1974, in the form of a schedule for hospital services; thereafter, an updated schedule was issued annually. On June 30, 1981, the cost-limit schedule was modified to exclude wages paid by federally owned hospitals when calculating the "wage index." The wage index was used to reflect the varying hospital employee salaries in different parts of the country. Prior to the 1981 modification, all hospitals' employee salaries, including federal government hospitals, were included in calculating the wage index.

Several Washington hospitals challenged the new rule in the United States District Court for the District of Columbia on the grounds that the Secretary had violated the Administrative Procedure Act (APA) in promulgating the rule by not first providing notice of proposed rulemaking and allowing an opportunity for public comment. The district court held in favor of the plaintiff hospitals on April 29, 1983. The court found that it did not have the power to enjoin the rule because the plaintiffs had not exhausted their administrative remedies. Rather than appeal, the Secretary reimbursed the hospitals according to the pre-1981 schedule.

=== Retroactive reinstatement of the rule ===
In February 1984, the Secretary issued a notice seeking public comment on a proposal to re-institute the 1981 rule, which would apply retroactively to July 1, 1981. Following the comment period, the Secretary issued the rule on November 26, 1984, and began recouping monies it disbursed to hospitals in accordance with the District Court's ruling during the period of July 1, 1981 to November 26, 1984, including $2 million from seven particular hospitals.

These seven hospitals, one of which was Georgetown University Hospital, exhausted their available administrative remedies and commenced a challenge to the retroactive rule in the District Court for the District of Columbia on the grounds that it violated the Administrative Procedure Act and the Medicare Act. The District Court granted summary judgment for the plaintiffs, finding that the circumstances did not justify a retroactively effective rule. The 1984 rule being invalidated, the Secretary—by then Otis Bowen—was ordered to recompute the reimbursements due to the hospitals under the pre-1981 rule. The Secretary appealed, and the United States Court of Appeals for the District of Columbia Circuit affirmed the lower court, but instead reasoned that the APA generally prohibits retroactive rulemaking and that the Medicare Act specifically prohibits retroactive cost-limit rules. The United States Supreme Court granted certiorari on February 29, 1988.

== Opinion of the Court ==
On October 11, 1988, the case was argued before the court, and a decision was issued on December 12. Justice Anthony Kennedy wrote for a unanimous court, holding that unless Congress expressly authorizes an agency to promulgate retroactive rules, its rulemaking power will not be understood to encompass retroactivity. Even if there is a sound justification for the retroactive rule, courts should be reluctant to find a permissible basis. The court affirmed the judgment of the D.C. Circuit.

The Court rejected the Secretary's argument that clause (ii) of 42 U.S.C. § 1395x(v)(1)(A) (§ 223(b) of the Medicare Act), which allows for "retroactive corrective adjustments," authorizes the retroactive cost-limit rule. Rather than allowing the Secretary to promulgate cost-limit rules, the statutory provision allows for "case-by-case adjustments" when the normal formula for calculating reimbursements does not reach the correct result "in individual cases". Retroactivity is statutorily permitted in individual adjudications, rather than in rulemaking. The court reached this determination by finding that past agency practice, the Medicare statute, and its legislative history do not indicate that Congress intended to grant the Secretary of Health and Human Services retroactive rulemaking power.

=== Concurrence ===
Justice Antonin Scalia concurred in the court's judgment, writing separately that the Court must consider not only whether the Medicare Act permits the Secretary to promulgate retroactive rules, but also whether the Administrative Procedure Act permits it. Agreeing with the circuit court, he wrote that "general principles of administrative law" prohibit the retroactivity, as well as both specific statutes. The APA's definition of a "rule" is an agency statement with "future effect." Therefore, rules must have legal consequences of only future effect. On the other hand, "orders" under the APA can have legal consequences for the past. Further, the Attorney General's Manual on the Administrative Procedure Act, which is the "Government's own most authoritative interpretation of the APA", instructs that rules under the APA have only future effect. Nonetheless, a rule that has only future effect can be secondarily retroactive by "affect[ing] past transactions" by, e.g. causing previously established trusts to be less desirable in the future; yet, it continues to be a rule under the APA because it does not alter past legal consequences. However, rules with unreasonable secondary retroactivity can be invalid under 5 U.S.C. § 706 for being arbitrary or capricious.

== See also ==
- List of United States Supreme Court cases, volume 488
- List of United States Supreme Court cases by the Rehnquist Court
- List of United States administrative law cases
- SEC v. Chenery Corp. (1943)
- SEC v. Chenery Corp. (1947)
