= Bi-Metallic Investment Co. v. State Board of Equalization =

- Supreme Court of the United States

Argued December 7–8, 1915 Decided December 20, 1915
- Full case name: Bi-Metallic Investment Co. v. State Board of Equalization
- Citations: 239 U.S. 441 (more) 36 S. Ct. 141; 60 L. Ed. 372

Holding
- Due process protections attach only to administrative activities in which a small number of people are concerned, who are exceptionally affected by the act, in each case upon individual grounds.

Court membership
- Chief Justice Edward D. White Associate Justices Joseph McKenna · Oliver W. Holmes Jr. William R. Day · Charles E. Hughes; Willis Van Devanter · Joseph R. Lamar; Mahlon Pitney · James C. McReynolds

Case opinion
- Majority: Holmes, joined by unanimous

Bi-Metallic Investment Co. v. State Board of Equalization, 239 U.S. 441 (1915), was a United States Supreme Court case which held that due process protections attach only to administrative activities in which a small number of people are concerned, who are exceptionally affected by the act, in each case upon individual grounds. By contrast, rule-making or quasi-legislative activities that affect a large number of people without regard to the facts of individual cases do not implicate due process protections. It is an important case in United States administrative law.

== Facts and procedural posture ==
The State Board of Equalization of the state of Colorado and the Colorado Tax Commission ordered that the valuation of all taxable property in Denver be increased by forty percent. Plaintiff company brought suit alleging that it had been deprived of its due process protections because a tax had been levied against its property without it being afforded an opportunity to be heard, in violation of the 14th Amendment. The Colorado Supreme Court ordered that the suit be dismissed.

The Supreme Court of the United States affirmed the dismissal, holding that no due process rights are implicated when a tax is levied against a large number of people who are all affected equally.

== Issue ==
Do all property owners have the right to be heard prior to the adoption of an administrative order increasing property taxes?

== Holding and decision ==
Where an agency rule applies to a vast number of people, the Constitution does not require that each be given an opportunity to be heard directly, which would be impractical. Thus, it is satisfied by the fact that, as voters, the taxpayers exercise "their power, immediate or remote, over those who make the rule".

== Analysis ==
The Court distinguishes this case from Londoner v. City and County of Denver, a 1908 case in which the Court held that individual taxpayers had a right to a hearing before an individualized benefits tax was assessed. Justice Holmes observed that in Londoner, "a relatively small number of persons was concerned, who were exceptionally affected, in each case upon individual grounds..." In contrast, here the taxpayers in Denver are affected equally, and in large numbers, and it would be an impractical impediment to government to afford all of them individual hearings. Instead, "their rights are protected in the only way that they can be in a complex society, by their power, immediate or remote, over those who make the rule." In other words, there was no violation of the Fourteenth Amendment because the taxpayers of Denver retained the right to organize and vote.

== See also ==
- List of United States Supreme Court cases, volume 239
