= Heckler v. Campbell =

- Supreme Court of the United States

Argued February 28, 1983 Decided May 16, 1983
- Full case name: Heckler, Secretary of Health and Human Services v. Campbell
- Citations: 461 U.S. 458 (more) 103 S. Ct. 1952; 76 L. Ed. 2d 66; 1983 U.S. LEXIS 161; 51 U.S.L.W. 4561

Holding
- The Court reversed the Second circuit saying that “[w]here the statute expressly entrusts the Secretary with the responsibility for implementing a provision by regulation, review is limited to determining whether the regulations promulgated exceeded the Secretary’s statutory authority and whether they are arbitrary and capricious.”

Court membership
- Chief Justice Warren E. Burger Associate Justices William J. Brennan Jr. · Byron White; Thurgood Marshall · Harry Blackmun; Lewis F. Powell Jr. · William Rehnquist; John P. Stevens · Sandra Day O'Connor

Case opinions
- Majority: Powell, joined by Burger, Brennan, White, Blackmun, Rehnquist, Stevens, O'Connor
- Concurrence: Brennan
- Concur/dissent: Marshall

Laws applied
- Social Security Act

Heckler v. Campbell, 461 U.S. 458 (1983), is a United States Supreme Court case concerning whether the United States Secretary of Health and Human Services could rely on published medical-vocational guidelines to determine a claimant’s right to Social Security benefits.

== Background ==
In 1978, the Secretary of Health and Human Services promulgated regulations in order to implement the statutory definition of disability. People who were disabled were separated into two groups: those who could not perform any gainful work and those with less severe impairments. For this second group, the Secretary promulgated guidelines to examine whether the claimant could perform either their former work or some less demanding employment by creating a matrix that evaluated four factors that had been identified by Congress: physical ability, age, education, and work experience. Information was also compiled about what jobs were available.

Carmen Campbell claimed she had a back condition that kept her from working at her former job as a hotel maid. Ms. Campbell had been born in Panama, and though she had limited ability to speak and write English, she could read and understand English to a fair degree. The administrative law judge in her case found that by using the guidelines, there were a significant number of jobs that existed that Ms. Campbell could perform and concluded that she was not disabled.

Ms. Campbell's case was appealed to the United States Court of Appeals for the Second Circuit which reversed the decision, saying that the guidelines did not provide evidence that specific alternative jobs existed, and that the determination that Ms. Campbell was not disabled was not supported by substantial evidence as required by the Social Security Act.

== Opinion of the Court ==
In an opinion delivered by Justice Powell, the Supreme Court reversed the Second Circuit, saying that “[w]here the statute expressly entrusts the Secretary with the responsibility for implementing a provision by regulation, review is limited to determining whether the regulations promulgated exceeded the Secretary’s statutory authority and whether they are arbitrary and capricious.” The Court decided that even where an agency's enabling statute expressly required that it hold a hearing, the agency could rely on its rulemaking authority to determine issues that didn't require case-by-case considerations.

The Court held that the Secretary’s reliance on the guidelines was not inconsistent with the Social Security Act, nor were the guidelines arbitrary and capricious.

Justice Brennan concurred while pointing out that the record contained scant evidence about Ms. Campbell's ability to do "light work."

Justice Marshall dissented essentially on the same grounds.
