= SEC v. Chenery Corp. (1943) =

Securities and Exchange Commission v. Chenery Corporation
- Supreme Court of the United States

Argued December 17–18, 1942 Decided February 1, 1943
- Full case name: Securities and Exchange Commission v. Chenery Corporation
- Citations: 318 U.S. 80 (more) 63 S. Ct. 454; 87 L. Ed. 626; 1943 U.S. LEXIS 1301

Case history
- Prior: Cert. to the United States Court of Appeals for the District of Columbia

Court membership
- Chief Justice Harlan F. Stone Associate Justices Owen Roberts · Hugo Black; Stanley F. Reed · Felix Frankfurter; William O. Douglas · Frank Murphy; Robert H. Jackson

Case opinions
- Majority: Frankfurter, joined by Stone, Roberts, Jackson
- Dissent: Black, joined by Reed, Murphy
- Douglas took no part in the consideration or decision of the case.

Securities and Exchange Commission v. Chenery Corporation, 318 U.S. 80 (1943), is a United States Supreme Court case. It is often referred to as Chenery I, as four years later the case was before the Supreme Court a second time in Chenery II. Chenery I set out what is known as the Chenery Doctrine, a basic principle of U.S. administrative law that an agency may not defend an administrative decision on new grounds not set forth by the agency in its original decision.

== Background ==
The respondents, who were officers, directors, and controlling stockholders of the Federal Water Service Corporation (hereafter called Federal), a holding company founded by Christopher Chenery and registered under the Public Utility Holding Company Act of 1935, c. 687, 49 Stat. 803, 15 U.S.C. § 79 et seq., brought this proceeding under § 24(a) of the Act to review an order made by the Securities and Exchange Commission on September 24, 1941, approving a plan of reorganization for the company. Under the Commission's order, preferred stock acquired by the respondents during the period in which successive reorganization plans proposed by the management of the company were before the Commission was not permitted to participate in the reorganization on an equal footing with all other preferred stock. The United States Court of Appeals for the District of Columbia, with one judge dissenting, set the Commission's order aside, 75 U.S.App.D.C. 374, 128 F.2d 303, and, because the question presented loomed large in the administration of the Act, the Supreme Court granted certiorari.

== See also ==
- Administrative law
- Securities and Exchange Commission v. Chenery Corporation (1947)
- Bowen v. Georgetown University Hospital
