= Auer v. Robbins =

- Supreme Court of the United States

Argued December 10, 1996 Decided February 19, 1997
- Full case name: Francis Bernard Auer, et al., Petitioners v. David A. Robbins, et al.
- Citations: 519 U.S. 452 (more) 117 S. Ct. 905; 137 L. Ed. 2d 79; 1997 U.S. LEXIS 1272; 65 U.S.L.W. 4136; 133 Lab. Cas. (CCH) ¶ 33,490; 97 Cal. Daily Op. Service 1157; 97 Daily Journal DAR 1673; 10 Fla. L. Weekly Fed. S 284
- Argument: Oral argument

Case history
- Prior: 65 F.3d 702 (8th Cir. 1995); cert. granted, 518 U.S. 1016 (1996).

Holding
- Sergeants and lieutenants are exempt from the Fair Labor Standards Act. Agencies have a high level of deference in interpreting their own regulations.

Court membership
- Chief Justice William Rehnquist Associate Justices John P. Stevens · Sandra Day O'Connor; Antonin Scalia · Anthony Kennedy; David Souter · Clarence Thomas; Ruth Bader Ginsburg · Stephen Breyer

Case opinion
- Majority: Scalia, joined by unanimous

Laws applied
- Fair Labor Standards Act of 1938

Auer v. Robbins, 519 U.S. 452 (1997), is a United States Supreme Court case that concerns the standard that the Court should apply when it reviews an executive department's interpretation of regulations established under federal legislation. The specific issue was whether sergeants and lieutenants in the St. Louis Police Department should be paid for working overtime. The Fair Labor Standards Act of 1938 established the overtime pay requirement, and the US Department of Labor issued regulations to determine if an employee was covered by the overtime requirement.

The Court held that it should defer to the Secretary of Labor's interpretation of the regulations.

== Background ==
Section 13(a)(1) of the Fair Labor Standards Act of 1938 exempted "bona fide executive, administrative, or professional" employees from overtime pay requirements. In determining whether an employee was exempt, the US Department of Labor and the Secretary of Labor applied a "salary-basis" test in 1940 that was not applicable to state and local employees.

In 1974, Congress extended the Fair Labor Standards Act of 1938 to cover all public-sector employees. For an employee to be exempt under the salary-basis test, the employee must earn a specified minimum amount on a salary basis. Employees would be considered to be paid on a salary basis if they routinely received a weekly predetermined payment that was not subject to reduction because of any variations in the "quality or quantity of the work performed."

Petitioners were sergeants, including Francis Bernard Auer, and a lieutenant employed by the St. Louis Police Department in Missouri. They sued the respondents, members of the St. Louis Board of Police Commissioners, including David A. Robbins, and sought overtime pay that they believed was owed to them under the FLSA. Petitioners argued that they did not meet the requirements of the Secretary's salary-basis test since the St. Louis Metropolitan Police Department Manual stated that their salary could be reduced for a variety of disciplinary infractions, including the quality or the quantity of work performed. Petitioners also argued their duties were not of an executive, administrative, or professional nature, as required under the salary-basis test.

The District Court found for the respondents, ruling that petitioners were paid on a salary basis. On appeal, the Eighth Circuit Court of Appeals affirmed in part and reversed in part. While petitioners had argued that the police department manual made it a possibility for employees to be deducted pay for disciplinary infractions, all employees are subject to such deductions that are nonexempt under the FLSA. Specifically, the petitioners highlighted the fact that one sergeant was actually subjected to a disciplinary deduction.

The Court of Appeals rejected the petitioners' argument. The Court held that a "one-time incident" in which disciplinary deductions were executed against one sergeant was a unique circumstance that did not defeat the salaried status of an employee. The Court held that both the salary-basis test and the duties test were satisfied to all petitioners.

The Supreme Court granted certiorari.

== Issue ==
- Did the Fair Labor Standards Act's rule regarding overtime pay for private-sector employees apply equally to public-sector employees?
- If the first question was answered in the affirmative, did the Secretary of Labor reasonably interpret the salary-basis test to deny public-sector employees salaried status and thus grant them overtime pay when their compensation might, "as a practical matter," be adjusted in ways that were ostensibly inconsistent with the letter of the test? Given that the police manual provided for disciplinary deductions in pay for the police officers, which is generally sufficient to preclude exempt status under the FLSA, the question was whether the possible but unlikely disciplinary deductions in pay, as provided for by the police manual, were enough to render the petitioners' pay "subject to" disciplinary deductions specifically within the meaning of the salary-basis test.

== Decision ==
The Supreme Court agreed with the Court of Appeals in holding that both the salary-basis test and the duties test were satisfied as to all petitioners. The Supreme Court dismissed the petitioners' argument that the regulations concerning "disciplinary actions" should not apply to public sector employees and instead deferred to the Secretary of Labor's regulations by citing Chevron U.S.A., Inc. v. Natural Resources Defense Council, Inc. (1984) because it was "based on a permissible construction of the statute." The Court denied the petitioners argument that public sector employee pay is distinguished from private sector employee pay because in the public sector enforcing compliance with work rules is a necessary component of effective government, thus reinforcing the 1974 extension of the FLSA to cover virtually all public sector employees.

While Chevron refers to the interpretation of an agency's enabling statute, the Court here gave deference to the agency in interpreting its own rules and regulatory schemes and reasoned that "because the salary-basis test is a creature of the Secretary's own regulations, his interpretation of it is, under our jurisprudence, controlling unless, 'plainly erroneous or inconsistent with the regulation.'" Further, the fact that the Secretary's interpretation came in the form of a legal brief did not make it unworthy of deference since the Secretary's position was "in no way a post hoc rationalization...to defend past agency action against attack." Under the Secretary's view, it is not enough that the police policy manual includes some specified penalties that involve disciplinary deductions in pay because the manual lists 58 possible rule violations and a range of penalties, which does not effectively communicate that pay deductions are or should be an anticipated form of punishment. Therefore, the Court stated that "no clear inference can be drawn as to the likelihood of a sanction being applied to employees such as petitioners."

Additionally, the Supreme Court states that even if the petitioners had been correct in their arguments, they did not follow the proper procedures. Under the APA, they should have gone through the regulatory appeals process, instead of directly appealing to the courts.

== Legacy ==
Auer deference gives agencies the highest level of deference in interpreting their own regulations. However, deference is warranted only if the language of the regulation is ambiguous unless it is plainly erroneous or inconsistent with the regulation. The case expands Chevron deference by giving the agency the highest deference.

In Chevron, there was a two-step standard of review. The Chevron standard dealt with "a formal rationale for judicial deference to an agency's interpretation of a statute." Auer did not adopt the two-step process for review in Chevron but a single level standard of deference "to an agency's permissible interpretation of its regulation."

Auer deals with the agency's interpretation of its own regulation, as opposed to the agency's interpretation of the statute, as in Chevron.

In Auer, the claim was not that the regulation was substantively unlawful or even that it violated a clear procedural prerequisite. It was that it was arbitrary and capricious not to conduct amendatory rulemaking, which might have resulted in no change. There was no basis for the court to set aside the agency's action, prior to any application for relief addressed to the agency itself.

The proper procedure for pursuit of respondent's grievance was set forth explicitly in the APA: a petition to the agency for rulemaking.

Though he wrote the opinion of the court, Justice Scalia, in Perez v. Mortgage Bankers Ass'n, would explicitly call for Auer to be overruled.

The question of whether to overturn Auer was the focus of the 2019 Supreme Court case, Kisor v. Wilkie. The Court's decision did not overturn Auer but set forth a set of conditions where courts should use the Auer deference, limiting the extent of its use.
