= Londoner v. City and County of Denver =

- Supreme Court of the United States

Argued March 6, 9, 1908 Decided June 1, 1908
- Full case name: Wolfe Londoner and Dennis Sheedy, Plaintiffs in Error v. City and County of Denver, as Successor to the City of Denver, et al.
- Citations: 210 U.S. 373 (more) 28 S. Ct. 708; 52 L. Ed. 1103; 1908 U.S. LEXIS 1517

Case history
- Prior: Error to the Supreme Court of the State of Colorado

Holding
- Where the legislature of a state, instead of fixing a tax, commits to some subordinate body the duty of determining whether, in what amount, and upon whom it shall be levied, and of making its assessment and apportionment, due process of law requires that, at some stage of the proceedings, before the tax becomes irrevocably fixed, the taxpayer shall have an opportunity to be heard, of which he must have notice.

Court membership
- Chief Justice Melville Fuller Associate Justices John M. Harlan · David J. Brewer; Edward D. White · Rufus W. Peckham; Joseph McKenna · Oliver W. Holmes Jr. William R. Day · William H. Moody

Case opinions
- Majority: Moody, joined by Harlan, Brewer, White, Peckham, McKenna, Day
- Dissent: Fuller
- Dissent: Holmes

Laws applied
- U.S. Const. amend. XIV

Londoner v. City and County of Denver, 210 U.S. 373 (1908), is a case in which the United States Supreme Court held that due process rights under the U.S. Constitution attach to administrative agency hearings that involve adjudication, but not to those that involve legislation.

== Legal principles ==
Due process protections attach to government agency activities that are adjudicative in nature, but not to activities that are legislative in nature.

== Analysis ==
The due process protections of the 14th Amendment of the U.S. Constitution require a hearing and opportunity to be heard whenever the government wishes to violate a citizen's life, liberty, or property. Due process rights attach to governmental activities that are adjudicative in nature, but not to activities that are legislative in nature. In the context of taxation, a legislative body has the power to tax without affording citizens due process protections. However, when the decision to tax particular individuals is made by a non-legislative body based on the individual facts and circumstances of a particular case, the decision becomes adjudicative in nature, and due process protections attach. These due process protections do not require a full trial, but the mere opportunity to file a written statement is insufficient. Due process in this context requires at least an opportunity to be heard in person and present evidence. No such opportunity was given. Therefore, the action violated due process, and the liens were void.

This case established that, where complaints are particularized and specific facts are at issue, adjudication is preferable since it is within a judge's expertise to resolve matters involving personal rights; when there is a general grievance bearing on future policies, rulemaking is preferable because the expertise and familiarity of an agency within its field helps to inform them on such decisions.

Here, the law of Colorado denied landowners post-deprivation hearings, the right to be heard after an assessment of taxes had been made. Thus, the right to a pre-deprivation hearing, allowing landowners to be heard prior to the assessment of taxes, was the only way in which the landowners could challenge the Government's actions depriving them of property.

== See also ==
- List of United States Supreme Court cases, volume 210
