= SEC v. Chenery Corp. (1947) =

- Supreme Court of the United States

Argued December 13, 16, 1946 Decided June 23, 1947
- Full case name: Securities and Exchange Commission v. Chenery Corporation
- Citations: 332 U.S. 194 (more) 67 S. Ct. 1575; 91 L. Ed. 1995; 1947 U.S. LEXIS 2988

Court membership
- Chief Justice Fred M. Vinson Associate Justices Hugo Black · Stanley F. Reed; Felix Frankfurter · William O. Douglas; Frank Murphy · Robert H. Jackson; Wiley B. Rutledge · Harold H. Burton

Case opinions
- Majority: Murphy, joined by Black, Reed, Rutledge
- Concurrence: Burton
- Dissent: Jackson, joined by Frankfurter
- Vinson and Douglas took no part in the consideration or decision of the case.

Laws applied
- Administrative Procedure Act, Public Utility Holding Company Act of 1935

Securities and Exchange Commission v. Chenery Corp., 332 U.S. 194 (1947), is a United States Supreme Court case. It is often referred to as Chenery II.

== Background ==
A federal water company was accused of illegal stock manipulation.

The SEC was charged with deciding whether the re-organization of companies that were in violation of the Public Utilities Company Holding Act was approved. The Chenerys were the Federal Water Service Corporation's officers, directors, and shareholders.

Originally, in the case called Chenery I, the company submitted a plan to the SEC, which the SEC did not approve. The reason the SEC gave was that the plan violated certain fraud standards. The first time this was heard before the Supreme Court in SEC v. Chenery Corporation, 318 U.S. 80 (1943), the Court held that the acts committed by the company did not amount to common law fraud and, therefore, the Securities and Exchange Commission's stated rationale for the charges could not be sustained.

On remand, the SEC charged the company's officials on different grounds, under its enabling act. The court used the case as an opportunity to discuss the merits of policy-making through adjudication and retroactive rule-making. The rejection again went before the Supreme Court as Chenery II.

This time the Supreme Court upheld the rejection. The explanation given was that the rejection in Chenery I was on the basis of standards that had not actually existed. But the SEC was authorized to create its standards in such cases, so long as it based the rejection on those standards. A court reviewing the SEC (or general agency) action would not approve it simply on the basis of the agency's authority, it had to be approved based on the rationale that the agency provided.

Since the SEC was authorized to create its standards, it was free to reject reorganization plans based on those standards - so long as that was the stated rationale of the SEC. Therefore, when the SEC, in Chenery II, explained that as the basis for their decision, it was upheld.

== Opinion of the Court ==
The US Supreme Court stated that policy-making through administrative adjudication is not necessarily wrong and may be desirable. Adjudication is more flexible than rule-making and allows the policy to be made on an ad hoc basis. This flexibility is important where there may be unforeseeable problems, inexperience with the problem, or the problem is so specialized and varied that a general rule would be impossible. Therefore, the choice between rule-making and adjudication lies in the informed discretion of the agency. However, this particular adjudication might be the application of impermissible retroactivity in interpreting the statute because the SEC seems to have decided after the fact, based on its actions in Chenery I, that the officers' actions were against the law. This type of retroactivity, in this case, was permissible.

The Court reversed the court of appeals on these grounds.

=== Dissents ===
Justice Jackson dissented because he felt that the basis for Chenery I was that the SEC must do rule-making before it applies this principle of law. He felt that the change in opinion was due to the change in the composition of the Court. He also argued that deference to the agency's expertise made no sense when the agency had never seen the particular problem before.

It is worth noting the extent of the turnover in the court between Chenery I and Chenery II. Although the decision seems to distinguish the two cases rather than overturn Chenery I, which has become part of the doctrine regarding agency action, both of the remaining justices from the majority in Chenery, I dissented in Chenery II.

The dissent is also notable for Jackson's reaction to the extraordinarily long and cumbersome majority opinion: "I give up. Now I realize fully what Mark Twain meant when he said, ‘The more you explain it, the more I don't understand it.’"

== See also ==
- Administrative law
