= Public Papers of the Presidents =

Book series

The Public Papers of the Presidents contain the papers and speeches of the presidents of the United States that were issued by the White House Office of the Press Secretary. The series constitutes a special edition of the Federal Register.

The Public Papers series is compiled and published by the Office of the Federal Register, National Archives and Records Administration. Each volume generally covers a six-month period of a given administration and presents content in chronological order, with headings providing the dates of the documents or events. In instances when the release date differs from the date of the document itself, the date of public release is shown in the textnote.

== Methodology ==
Remarks are checked against an audio recording (if available) or read aloud against official transcripts (if no audio source is available), and signed documents are checked against the original with exacting attention paid to preserving the integrity of the signed document. Textnotes and cross references are provided by the editors for purposes of identification or clarity, usually of notable people referred to by the president or others participating in an event. Speeches are assumed to have been delivered in Washington, DC, unless otherwise indicated in the item heading. The times noted are assumed to be local times. All materials printed in full text in the book are indexed in the subject and name indexes and listed in the document categories list. With few exceptions, deceased people are not indexed by name. The notes are intended for the general reader, and specific criteria govern decisions about inclusion in or exclusion from the note with an eye toward keeping references standardized, succinct, and useful.

== History ==
The Public Papers of the Presidents series was begun in 1957 in response to a recommendation of the National Historical Publications Commission. An extensive compilation of messages and papers of the presidents covering the period 1789 to 1897 was assembled by James D. Richardson and published under congressional authority between 1896 and 1899. Since then, various private compilations have been issued, but there was no uniform publication comparable to the Congressional Record or the United States Supreme Court Reports. Many presidential papers could be found only in the form of mimeographed White House releases or as reported in the press. The commission therefore recommended the establishment of an official series in which presidential writings, addresses, and remarks of a public nature could be made available. The commission's recommendation was incorporated in regulations of the Administrative Committee of the Federal Register, issued under section 6 of the Federal Register Act (44 U.S.C. 1506), which may be found in title 1, part 10, of the Code of Federal Regulations.

== Related publications ==
Another special edition of the Federal Register arose as a companion publication to the Public Papers series, the Weekly Compilation of Presidential Documents, which was first published in 1965 to provide a broader range of presidential materials on a more timely basis to meet the needs of the contemporary reader. Beginning with the administration of Jimmy Carter, the Public Papers series expanded its coverage to include additional material as printed in the Weekly Compilation, including detailed appendices of supplemental material: Digest of Other White House Announcements, Nominations Submitted to the Senate, Checklist of White House Press Releases, and Presidential Documents Published in the Federal Register.

== Online access ==
On January 20, 2009, the printed Weekly Compilation of Presidential Documents was superseded by the online Daily Compilation of Presidential Documents. The Daily Compilation provides a listing of the President's daily schedule and meetings, when announced, and other items of general interest issued by the Office of the Press Secretary. In 2012, the Government Printing Office and the Office of the Federal Register released a mobile web application (https://www.govinfo.gov/app/collection/cpd) that catalogues the daily public activities of the president of the United States and enhances features of the online Daily Compilation with user-friendly search capability, allowing users to access presidential content by date, category, subject, or location.

== Scope and availability ==
Volumes covering the administrations of presidents Herbert Hoover, Harry S. Truman, Dwight D. Eisenhower, John F. Kennedy, Lyndon B. Johnson, Richard Nixon, Gerald R. Ford, Jimmy Carter, Ronald Reagan, George H. W. Bush, William J. Clinton, George W. Bush, and Barack Obama are also included in the Public Papers series. Books can be ordered through the Government Publishing Office and commercial booksellers or accessed at large libraries, such as university libraries, regional libraries, or Federal Depository libraries.
