= Signing statement =

Statement by US president when approving laws

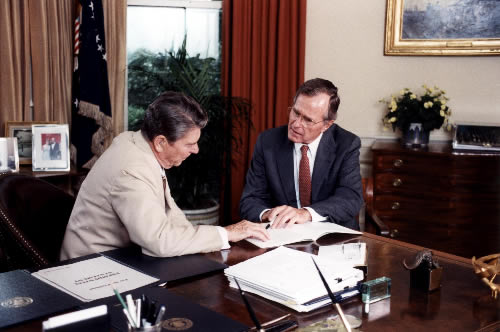
Presidents Ronald Reagan (left) and George H. W. Bush (right) issued significant numbers of signing statements containing constitutional objections to laws passed by Congress.

A signing statement is a written pronouncement issued by the President of the United States upon the signing of a bill into law. They are usually printed in the Federal Register's Compilation of Presidential Documents and the United States Code Congressional and Administrative News (USCCAN). The statements offer the president's view of the law or laws created by the bill.

There are two kinds of signing statements. One type, which is not controversial, consists only of political rhetoric or commentary, such as praising what the bill does and thanking Congress for enacting it. The other type, which has attracted significant controversy, is more technical or legalistic, and consists of the president's interpretations of the meaning of provisions of the bill—including claims that one or more sections are unconstitutional. The latter type usually amount to a claim that newly created legal restrictions on the executive branch or president are not binding and need not be enforced or obeyed as written.

During the administration of President George W. Bush, there was a controversy over the President's use of signing statements to challenge numerous sections of bills as unconstitutional constraints on executive power; Bush used the device both to raise challenges to more provisions than all previous presidents combined had done, and to advance an unusually broad conception of presidential power. The Bush administration did not invent the practice, however: previous presidents had also used signing statements in that manner since the Reagan administration, and the succeeding Obama administration also continued the practice. In August 2006, the American Bar Association's house of delegates adopted a task force's conclusion that presidents should stop using signing statements to modify the meaning of duly enacted laws because the practice serves to "undermine the rule of law and our constitutional system of separation of powers".

== Types ==
A study released by then-Assistant Attorney General Walter Dellinger (1993–1996) grouped signing statements into three categories:

- Constitutional: asserts that the law is constitutionally defective in order to guide executive agencies in limiting its implementation;
- Political: defines vague terms in the law to guide executive agencies in its implementation as written;
- Rhetorical: uses the signing of the bill to mobilize political constituencies.

In recent usage, the phrase "signing statement" has referred mostly to statements by a president declaring that certain new statutes he has signed into law are unconstitutional and so do not need to be enforced or obeyed, and directing, explicitly or implicitly, executive branch departments and agencies to interpret the new statutes in the same way.

Critics, including the American Bar Association, have contended that this practice amounts to a line-item veto because it allows a president to accept the parts of a bill he likes while rejecting other parts that lawmakers bundled together with those parts, except that it gives Congress no ability to vote to override a veto. (The Supreme Court has held that line-item vetos are unconstitutional in a 1998 case, Clinton v. City of New York.) Supporters of signing statements have contended that the practice is necessary as a matter of political reality because Congress frequently passes large bills that cover many topics and may have small flaws, and that it would cripple government for a president to veto such legislation over the small flaws.

== Applying a metric to signing statements ==
There is a controversy about how to count an executive's use of signing statements.

One complexity centers on what counts as a relevant signing statement. A counting of the total number of bill signing statements by any particular president that included purely rhetorical and political messages about legislation would result in a misleading number for the purpose of a discussion about signing statements that make constitutional challenges to sections of the bills being enacted into law.

Another complexity centers on whether what matters is the number of bills to which a signing statement has been appended, or the number of challenges to newly created sections of statutory code. For example, Congress could pass three short bills about discrete topics, each of a president signed but challenged with three different signing statements. Or Congress could bundle the same legislative language into a single bill with three sections, about which a president could issue one signing statement that made three discrete challenges. As a matter of legal substance, the result is the same—three challenges to new sections of law—but the latter could be measured as one or three presidential acts.

A Congressional Research Service report issued on September 17, 2007, compared the total number of presidents' signing statements that made any constitutional objection to at least one part of a bill—regardless of how many bill sections were flagged—to the total number of issued by presidents, including those what were purely rhetorical or political messages. By that metric, it made the following findings:

President Reagan issued 250 signing statements, 86 of which (34%) contained provisions objecting to one or more of the statutory provisions signed into law. President George H. W. Bush continued this practice, issuing 228 signing statements, 107 of which (47%) raised objections. President [Bill] Clinton's conception of presidential power proved to be largely consonant with that of the preceding two administrations. In turn, President Clinton made aggressive use of the signing statement, issuing 381 statements, 70 of which (18%) raised constitutional or legal objections. President George W. Bush has continued this practice, issuing 152 signing statements, 118 of which (78%) contain some type of challenge or objection.

In March 2009, The New York Times cited a different metric. It ignored purely rhetorical or political messaging statements, while counting the number of challenges to sections within bills to which presidents made constitutional objections regardless of how many bills and accompanying statements were involved. By that metric, it recounted the following findings:

Mr. [George W.] Bush ... broke all records, using signing statements to challenge about 1,200 sections of bills over his eight years in office, about twice the number challenged by all previous presidents combined, according to data compiled by Christopher Kelley, a political science professor at Miami University in Ohio.

== Legal significance ==
No provision of the U.S. Constitution, federal statute, or common-law principle explicitly permits or prohibits signing statements. However, there is also no part of the Constitution that grants legal value to signing statements. Article I, Section 7 (in the Presentment Clause) empowers the president to veto a law in its entirety, to sign it, or to do nothing. Article II, Section 3 requires that the executive "take care that the laws be faithfully executed". The Constitution does not authorize the President to cherry-pick which parts of validly enacted Congressional Laws he is going to obey and execute, and which he is not. The complexity is that if a section of U.S. code is not constitutional, then by definition it was not validly enacted. One part of the debate, then, is whether it is proper for a particular president to sign into law a statutory section that he considered at the time to be invalid, while declaring that he will not consider it binding, rather than vetoing the entire bill and sending it back to Congress.

Signing statements do not appear to have legal force outside the executive branch by themselves, although they are all published by the Federal Register. As a practical matter, those that announce a president's interpretations of—or constitutional objections to—newly enacted statutes amount, implicitly or explicitly, of instructions to subordinate government officials to interpret the new laws the same way. There is a controversy about whether they should be considered as part of legislative history.

Presidential signing statements maintain particular potency with federal executive agencies, since these agencies are often responsible for the administration and enforcement of federal laws. A 2007 article in the Administrative Law Review noted how some federal agencies' usage of signing statements may not withstand legal challenges under common law standards of judicial deference to agency action.

=== Supreme Court rulings ===
The Supreme Court has not squarely addressed the limits of signing statements. Marbury v. Madison (1803) and its progeny are generally considered to have established judicial review as a power of the Court, rather than of the Executive. Chevron U.S.A., Inc. v. Natural Resources Defense Council, Inc., 467 U.S. 837 (1984), established court deference to executive interpretations of a law "if Congress has not directly spoken to the precise question at issue" and if the interpretation is reasonable. This applies only to executive agencies; the President himself is not entitled to Chevron deference. To the extent that a signing statement would nullify part or all of a law, the Court may have addressed the matter in Clinton v. City of New York (1998), which invalidated the line-item veto because it violated bicameralism and presentment.

=== Presidential usage ===
The first president to issue a signing statement was James Monroe. Until the 1980s, with some exceptions, signing statements were generally triumphal, rhetorical, or political proclamations and went mostly unannounced. Until Ronald Reagan became president, only 75 statements had been issued; Reagan and his successors George H. W. Bush and Bill Clinton produced 247 signing statements between the three of them. By the end of 2004, George W. Bush had issued 108 signing statements containing 505 constitutional challenges. As of January 30, 2008, he had signed 157 signing statements challenging over 1,100 provisions of federal law.

The upswing in the use of signing statements during the Reagan administration coincides with the writing by Samuel Alito – then a staff attorney in the Justice Department's Office of Legal Counsel – of a 1986 memorandum making the case for "interpretive signing statements" as a tool to "increase the power of the Executive to shape the law". Alito proposed adding signing statements to a "reasonable number of bills" as a pilot project, but warned that "Congress is likely to resent the fact that the President will get in the last word on questions of interpretation."

A November 3, 1993, memo from White House Counsel Bernard Nussbaum explained the use of signing statements to object to potentially unconstitutional legislation:

If the President may properly decline to enforce a law, at least when it unconstitutionally encroaches on his powers, then it arguably follows that he may properly announce to Congress and to the public that he will not enforce a provision of an enactment he is signing. If so, then a signing statement that challenges what the President determines to be an unconstitutional encroachment on his power, or that announces the President's unwillingness to enforce (or willingness to litigate) such a provision, can be a valid and reasonable exercise of Presidential authority.

This same Department of Justice memorandum observed that use of presidential signing statements to create legislative history for the use of the courts was uncommon before the Reagan and Bush presidencies. In 1986, Attorney General Edwin Meese entered into an arrangement with the West Publishing Company to have Presidential signing statements published for the first time in the U.S. Code Congressional and Administrative News, the standard collection of legislative history

=== Blue ribbon panel on signing statements ===
On July 24, 2006, the American Bar Association's Task Force on Presidential Signing Statements and the Separation of Powers Doctrine, appointed by ABA President Michael S. Greco, issued a widely publicized report condemning some uses of signing statements. The task force report and recommendations were unanimously approved by ABA delegates at their August 2006 meeting.

The bipartisan and independent blue-ribbon panel was chaired by Miami lawyer Neal Sonnett, a former Assistant U.S. Attorney and Chief of the Criminal Division for the Southern District of Florida. He is past chair of the ABA Criminal Justice Section, chair of the ABA Task Force on Domestic Surveillance and the ABA Task Force on Treatment of Enemy Combatants; and president-elect of the American Judicature Society. The report stated in part:

Among those unanimous recommendations, the Task Force voted to:

- oppose, as contrary to the rule of law and our constitutional system of separation of powers, a President's issuance of signing statements to claim the authority or state the intention to disregard or decline to enforce all or part of a law he has signed, or to interpret such a law in a manner inconsistent with the clear intent of Congress;
- urge the President, if he believes that any provision of a bill pending before Congress would be unconstitutional if enacted, to communicate such concerns to Congress prior to passage;
- urge the President to confine any signing statements to his views regarding the meaning, purpose, and significance of bills, and to use his veto power if he believes that all or part of a bill is unconstitutional;
- urge Congress to enact legislation requiring the President promptly to submit to Congress an official copy of all signing statements, and to report to Congress the reasons and legal basis for any instance in which he claims the authority, or states the intention, to disregard or decline to enforce all or part of a law he has signed, or to interpret such a law in a manner inconsistent with the clear intent of Congress, and to make all such submissions be available in a publicly accessible database.

=== Congressional efforts to restrict signing statements ===
Sen. Arlen Specter (then a Republican of Pennsylvania) introduced the Presidential Signing Statements Act of 2006 on July 26, 2006. The bill would:

1. Instruct all state and federal courts to ignore presidential signing statements. ("No State or Federal court shall rely on or defer to a presidential signing statement as a source of authority.")
2. Instruct the Supreme Court to allow the U.S. Senate or U.S. House of Representatives to file suit in order to determine the constitutionality of signing statements.

The bill was referred to the Senate Judiciary Committee, which Specter chaired at the time, on the day it was introduced. As with all unpassed bills, it expired with the end of the 109th United States Congress on December 9, 2006.

Specter reintroduced the legislation with the Presidential Signing Statements Act of 2007, but it died in the same committee.

== Signing statements by administrations ==
=== Bush administration ===
George W. Bush's use of signing statements was and is controversial, both for the number of bill sections he challenged—more than 1,200, or twice as many as all previous presidents combined—and for the broad view of executive power that he used the device to advance. Most famously, he used a signing statement in December 2005 to assert that because he was the commander-in-chief and head of the so-called unitary executive branch, a new law purporting to ban torture was unconstitutional. That statement, appended to the Detainee Treatment Act of 2005, specifically challenged, among others, a provision prohibiting cruel, inhumane, and degrading treatment of detainees in U.S. custody with the following language:

The executive branch shall construe... the Act, relating to detainees, in a manner consistent with the constitutional authority of the President to supervise the unitary executive branch and as Commander in Chief ... [an approach that] 'will assist in achieving the shared objective of the Congress and the President . . . of protecting the American people from further terrorist attacks."

The use of signing statements that fall into the constitutional category can create conundrums for executive branch employees. Political scientist James Pfiffner has written:

The president is the head of the executive branch, and in general, executive branch officials are bound to follow his direction. In cases in which a subordinate is ordered to do something illegal, the person can legitimately refuse the order. But if the public administrator is ordered to refuse to execute the law ... because the president has determined that the law infringes on his own interpretation of his constitutional authority, the public administrator faces an ethical dilemma.

=== Obama administration ===
On March 9, 2009, President Barack Obama ordered his executive officials to consult Attorney General Eric Holder before relying on one of George W. Bush's signing statements to bypass a statute. He stated that he only planned to use signing statements when given legislation by Congress which contain unconstitutional provisions. In a memo to the heads of each department in the executive branch, Obama wrote:

In exercising my responsibility to determine whether a provision of an enrolled bill is unconstitutional, I will act with caution and restraint, based only on interpretations of the Constitution that are well-founded.

During his presidential campaign, Obama rejected the use of signing statements. He was asked at one rally: "when congress offers you a bill, do you promise not to use presidential signing statements to get your way?" Obama gave a one-word reply: "Yes." He added that "we aren't going to use signing statements as a way to do an end run around Congress." On March 11, 2009, Obama issued his first signing statement, attached to the omnibus spending bill for the second half of the 2009 fiscal year.

Numerous provisions of the legislation purport to condition the authority of officers to spend or reallocate funds on the approval of congressional committees. These are impermissible forms of legislative aggrandizement in the execution of the laws other than by enactment of statutes. Therefore, although my Administration will notify the relevant committees before taking the specified actions, and will accord the recommendations of such committees all appropriate and serious consideration, spending decisions shall not be treated as dependent on the approval of congressional committees. Likewise, one other provision gives congressional committees the power to establish guidelines for funding costs associated with implementing security improvements to buildings. Executive officials shall treat such guidelines as advisory. Yet another provision requires the Secretary of the Treasury to accede to all requests of a Board of Trustees that contains congressional representatives. The Secretary shall treat such requests as nonbinding.

This statement indicated that while the administration could ignore several provisions of the bill, they would advise congressional committees, and take congressional committees' guidelines as advisory, as he considered that "provisions of the legislation purport to condition the authority of officers to spend or reallocate funds on the approval of congressional committees" and the result would be "impermissible forms of legislative aggrandizement in the execution of the laws other than by enactment of statutes", including sections dealing with negotiations with foreign governments, restrictions on US involvement in UN peacekeeping missions, protections for government whistleblowers, and certain congressional claims of authority over spending. Obama issued a total of 37 signing statements during the course of his presidency.

== Non-signing statement ==
The "non-signing statement" is a related method that some presidents have used to express concerns about certain provisions in a bill without vetoing it. With the non-signing statement, presidents announce their reasons for declining to sign, while allowing the bill to become law unsigned. The U.S. Constitution allows such enactments by default: if the President does not sign the bill, it becomes law after ten days, excepting Sundays, "unless the Congress by their Adjournment prevent its Return..."

Some governors in U.S. states have also used a non-signing statement to express reservations about a measure while allowing it to proceed.

== See also ==
- Enabling act § United States
- List of United States federal executive orders
- Presidential proclamation
- Reservation (law)
- Unitary executive theory
