= Title 3 of the Code of Federal Regulations =

US title on the president

CFR Title 3 – The President is one of 50 titles composing the United States Code of Federal Regulations (CFR) and contains the principal set of rules and regulations issued by federal agencies regarding the Executive Office of the President of the United States. It is available in digital and printed form and can be referenced online using the Electronic Code of Federal Regulations (e-CFR).

== Structure ==
The table of contents, as reflected in the e-CFR updated February 20, 2014, is as follows:

Volume	Chapter	Parts	Regulatory Entity
			Presidential Documents
1	I	100-199	Executive Office of the President

== History ==
The CFR was authorized by President Franklin D. Roosevelt on October 11, 1938, as a means to organize and maintain the growing material published by federal agencies in the newly mandated Federal Register. The first volume of the CFR was published in 1939 with general applicability and legal effect in force June 1, 1938.

The Office of the Federal Register (OFR) began publishing yearly revisions for some titles in 1963 with legal effective dates of January 1 each year. By 1967 all 50 titles were updated annually and effective January 1.

The CFR was placed online in 1996. The OFR began updating the entire CFR online on a daily basis in 2001.
