= Code of Federal Regulations =

Codification of US federal regulations

- The Code of Federal Regulations
- Discipline: Administrative law
- Language: English

Publication details
- Publisher: Office of the Federal Register (United States)
- Frequency: Annually
- License: Public domain

Standard abbreviations
- Bluebook: C.F.R.
- ISO 4: Code Fed. Regul.

Indexing
- ISSN: 1946-4975

Links
- Journal homepage; Online access

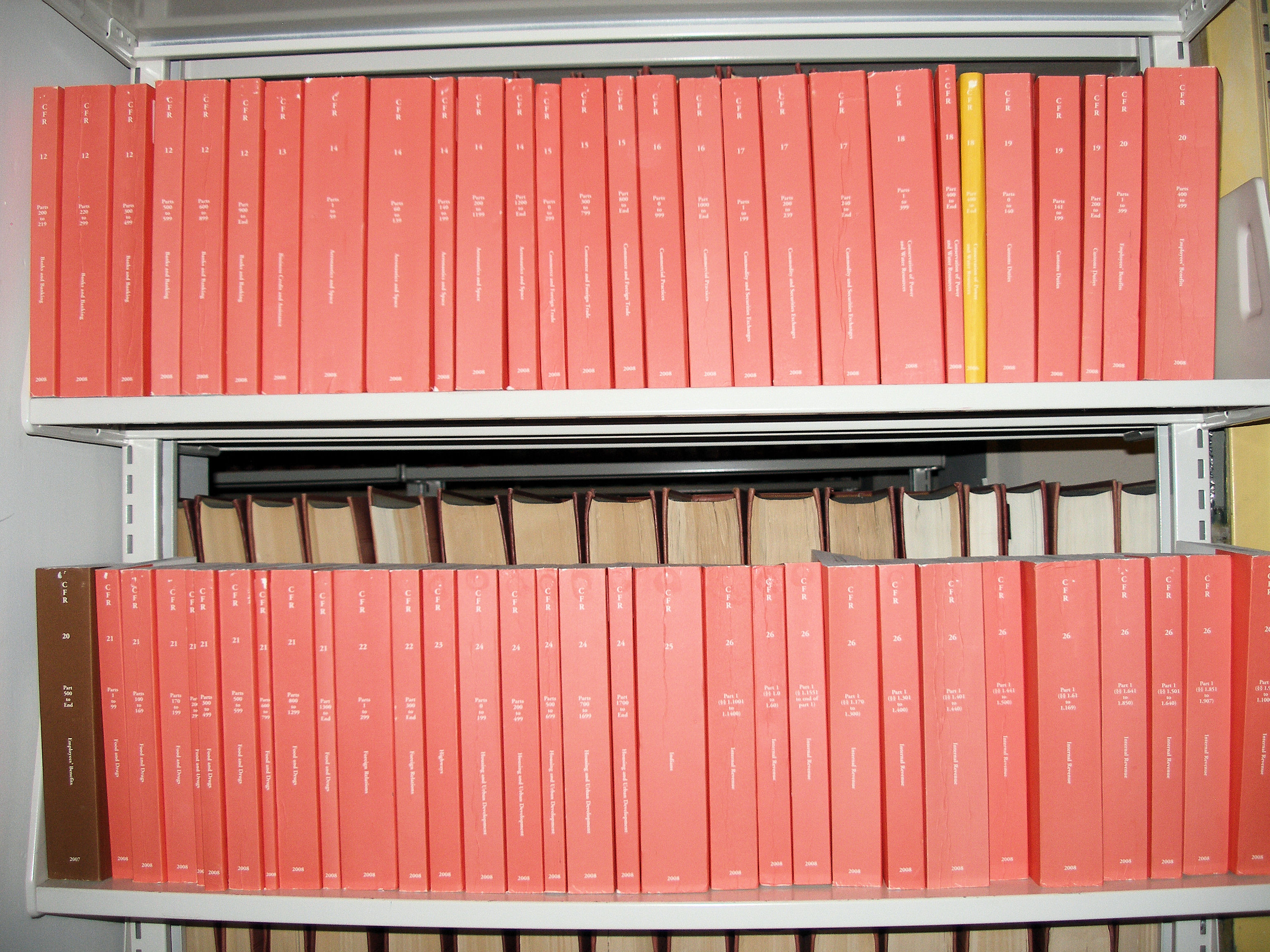
A few volumes of the CFR at a law library (titles 12–26)

In the law of the United States, the Code of Federal Regulations (CFR) is the codification of the general and permanent regulations promulgated by the executive departments and agencies of the federal government of the United States. The CFR is divided into 50 titles that represent broad areas subject to federal regulation.

The CFR annual edition is published as a special issue of the Federal Register by the Office of the Federal Register (part of the National Archives and Records Administration) and the Government Publishing Office. In addition to this annual edition, the CFR is published online on the Electronic CFR (e-CFR) website, which is updated daily.

== Background ==
Congress frequently delegates authority to an executive branch agency to issue regulations to govern some sphere. These statutes are called "authorizing statute" or "enabling statute" (or "authorizing legislation"). Authorizing statutes typically have two parts: (1) a substantive scope, typically using language such as "The Secretary shall promulgate regulations to [accomplish some purpose or within some scope]"; and (2) procedural requirements, typically to invoke rulemaking requirements of the Administrative Procedure Act (APA), Paperwork Reduction Act (PRA, codified at 44 U.S.C. §§ 3501–3521), Regulatory Flexibility Act (RFA, codified at 5 U.S.C. §§ 601–612), and several executive orders (primarily Executive Order 12866)). Generally, each of these laws requires a process that includes (a) publication of the proposed rules in a notice of proposed rulemaking (NPRM), (b) certain cost-benefit analyses, (c) request for public comment and participation in the decision-making, and (d) adoption and publication of the final rule, via the Federal Register. Rulemaking culminates in the inclusion of a regulation in the Code of Federal Regulations. Such regulations are often referred to as "implementing regulations" vis-a-vis the authorizing statute.

== Publication procedure ==
The rules and regulations are first promulgated or published in the Federal Register. The CFR is structured into 50 subject matter titles. Agencies are assigned chapters within these titles. The titles are broken down into chapters, parts, sections and paragraphs. For example, 42 C.F.R. § 260.11(a)(1) would indicate "title 42, part 260, section 11, paragraph (a)(1)." Conversationally, it would be read as "forty-two C F R two-sixty point eleven a one" or similar.

While new regulations are continually becoming effective, the printed volumes of the CFR are issued once each calendar year, on this schedule:

- Titles 1–16 are updated as of January 1
- Titles 17–27 are updated as of April 1
- Titles 28–41 are updated as of July 1
- Titles 42–50 are updated as of October 1

The Office of the Federal Register also keeps an unofficial, online version of the CFR, the e-CFR, which is normally updated within two days after changes that have been published in the Federal Register become effective. The Parallel Table of Authorities and Rules lists rulemaking authority for regulations codified in the CFR.

== List of CFR titles ==
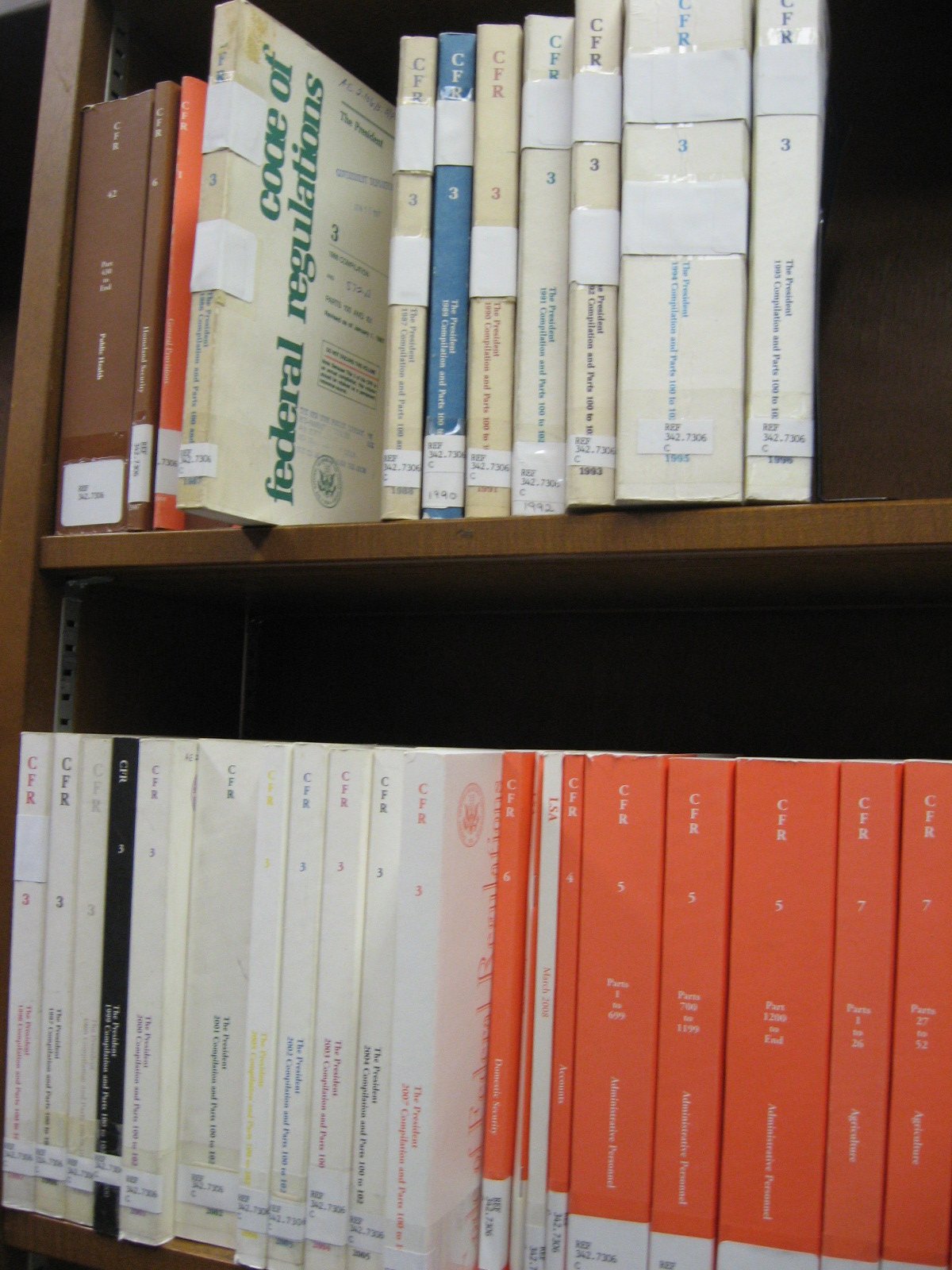
Code of Federal Regulations, seen at the Mid-Manhattan Library. Editions of Title 3, on the President, are kept on archive. Notice that for the first year of each new presidency, the volume is thicker.

The CFR is divided into 50 titles that represent broad subject areas:

- Title 1: General Provisions
- Title 2: Grants and Agreements
- Title 3: The President
- Title 4: Accounts
- Title 5: Administrative Personnel
- Title 6: Domestic Security
- Title 7: Agriculture
- Title 8: Aliens and Nationality
- Title 9: Animals and Animal Products
- Title 10: Energy
- Title 11: Federal Elections
- Title 12: Banks and Banking
- Title 13: Business Credit and Assistance
- Title 14: Aeronautics and Space (also known as the Federal Aviation Regulations)
- Title 15: Commerce and Foreign Trade
- Title 16: Commercial Practices
- Title 17: Commodity and Securities Exchanges
- Title 18: Conservation of Power and Water Resources
- Title 19: Customs Duties
- Title 20: Employees' Benefits
- Title 21: Food and Drugs
- Title 22: Foreign Relations
- Title 23: Highways
- Title 24: Housing and Urban Development
- Title 25: Indians
- Title 26: Internal Revenue (also known as the Treasury Regulations)
- Title 27: Alcohol, Tobacco Products and Firearms
- Title 28: Judicial Administration
- Title 29: Labor
- Title 30: Mineral Resources
- Title 31: Money and Finance: Treasury
- Title 32: National Defense
- Title 33: Navigation and Navigable Waters
- Title 34: Education
- Title 35: Reserved (formerly Panama Canal)
- Title 36: Parks, Forests, and Public Property
- Title 37: Patents, Trademarks, and Copyrights
- Title 38: Pensions, Bonuses, and Veterans' Relief
- Title 39: Postal Service
- Title 40: Protection of Environment
- Title 41: Public Contracts and Property Management
- Title 42: Public Health
- Title 43: Public Lands: Interior
- Title 44: Emergency Management and Assistance
- Title 45: Public Welfare
- Title 46: Shipping
- Title 47: Telecommunication
- Title 48: Federal Acquisition Regulations System
- Title 49: Transportation
- Title 50: Wildlife and Fisheries

== History ==
The Federal Register Act originally provided for a complete compilation of all existing regulations promulgated prior to the first publication of the Federal Register, but was amended in 1937 to provide a codification of all regulations every five years. The first edition of the CFR was published in 1938. Beginning in 1963 for some titles and for all titles in 1967, the Office of the Federal Register began publishing yearly revisions, and beginning in 1972 published revisions in staggered quarters.

On March 11, 2014, Rep. Darrell Issa introduced the Federal Register Modernization Act (H.R. 4195; 113th Congress), a bill that would revise requirements for the filing of documents with the Office of the Federal Register for inclusion in the Federal Register and for the publication of the Code of Federal Regulations to reflect the changed publication requirement in which they would be available online but would not be required to be printed. The American Association of Law Libraries (AALL) strongly opposed the bill, arguing that the bill undermines citizens' right to be informed by making it more difficult for citizens to find their government's regulations. According to AALL, a survey they conducted "revealed that members of the public, librarians, researchers, students, attorneys, and small business owners continue to rely on the print" version of the Federal Register. AALL also argued that the lack of print versions of the Federal Register and CFR would mean the 15 percent of Americans who do not use the internet would lose their access to that material. The House voted on July 14, 2014, to pass the bill 386–0. However, the bill failed to come to a vote in the Senate, and died upon the start of the 114th Congress.

== Activity and changes over time ==
The Code of Federal Regulations is a dynamic document with many changes and edits over time; however, tracking the edits and their impact is difficult. Simple counts of the number of rules, words, or pages is insufficient.

== See also ==
- United States Code
- Regulations.gov
- United States Reports
- California Code of Regulations
- Florida Administrative Code
- Illinois Administrative Code
- Code of Massachusetts Regulations
- List of CFR Sections Affected
- New Hampshire Code of Administrative Rules
- New Jersey Administrative Code
- New York Codes, Rules and Regulations
- Oregon Administrative Rules
- Pennsylvania Code
