= Daily Compilation of Presidential Documents =

- Language: English

Publication details
- Former name(s): Weekly Compilation of Presidential Documents
- Publisher: Office of the Federal Register, National Archives and Records Administration (United States)
- Frequency: Daily
- Open access: Yes
- License: Public domain

Standard abbreviations
- ISO 4: Dly. Compil. Pres. Doc.

Indexing
- ISSN: 1946-6986

Links
- Journal homepage

The Daily Compilation of Presidential Documents collection is composed of the Daily Compilation of Presidential Documents and its predecessor, the Weekly Compilation of Presidential Documents. Since 1993, it has been published by the Office of the Federal Register, National Archives and Records Administration (NARA) under the authority of the Federal Register Act (44 U.S.C. Ch. 15; 1 C.F.R. part 10).

This GovInfo collection integrates material from the weekly publication dating from 1993, with Daily Compilation material as published since January 20, 2009. The website is updated frequently, as information is released by the White House press office to Federal Register editors. Documents appearing in the Compilation of Presidential Documents collection are edited for accuracy and annotated with additional information to provide an authoritative record of the Presidency. It includes such material as:

- Proclamations
- Executive orders
- Speeches
- Press conferences
- Communications to Congress and Federal agencies
- Statements regarding bill signings and vetoes
- Appointments and nominations
- Reorganization plans
- Resignations
- Retirements
- Acts approved by the President
- Nominations submitted to the Senate
- White House announcements
- Press releases
