= United States Government Manual =

Official handbook of the United States federal government

The United States Government Manual is the official handbook of the federal government, published annually by the Office of the Federal Register, printed and distributed by the United States Government Publishing Office. The first edition was issued in 1935; before the 1973/74 edition it was known as the United States Government Organization Manual.

== Content ==
The Manual provides comprehensive information on the agencies of the legislative, judicial, and executive branches. It also includes information on quasi-official agencies; international organizations in which the United States participates; and boards, commissions, and committees. Appendices include a list of agency acronyms and a cumulative list of agencies terminated, transferred, or changed in name since 1933.

A typical federal agency description includes:

- A brief history of the agency, including its legislative or executive authority.
- A description of its programs and activities.
- A list of officials heading major operating units.
- A summary statement of the agency's purpose and role in the federal government.
- Information, addresses, websites and phone numbers to help users locate detailed information on consumer activities, contracts and grants, employment, publications, and other matters of public interest.

== Availability ==
Since 2011 the Manual has been freely offered online, in a continuously updated edition. The annual printed edition of the Manual was discontinued in 2015.

GovInfo offers freely downloadable PDF copies of the U.S. Government Manual for 1995–1996 and all subsequent editions to the present, and ASCII text copies from 1995–1996 to 2009–2010.
