= Sonnett =

Sonnett is a surname. Notable people with the surname include:

- Emily Sonnett (born 1993), American soccer player
- Neal Sonnett, American attorney
- Will Sonnett, the main character in the TV series The Guns of Will Sonnett (1967–1969)

== See also ==
- Sonnet
