= United States Code Congressional and Administrative News =

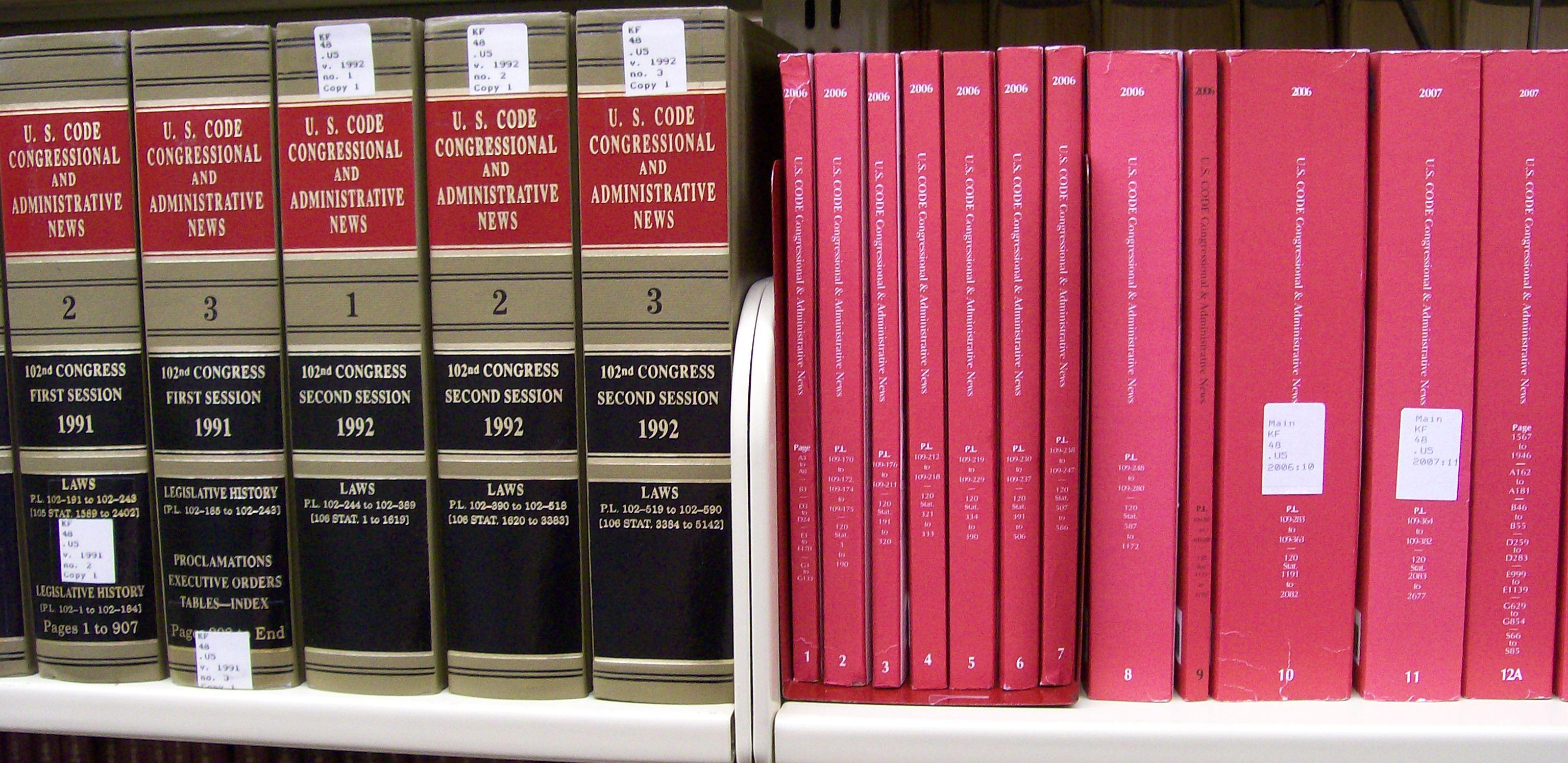
Several volumes of the U.S.C.C.A.N. The red volumes on the right are the monthly pamphlets and the bound volumes on the left are some of the yearly compilations for the 102nd Congress.

The United States Code Congressional and Administrative News (U.S.C.C.A.N.) is a publication that collects selected congressional and administrative materials. U.S.C.C.A.N. was first published in 1941 and has continued to be published in monthly pamphlets. Among other documents, U.S.C.C.A.N. publishes the full text of new federal laws, presidential proclamations, executive orders, federal regulations and sentencing guidelines. Prior to the 99th Congress, the legislative history materials in contained only a House or Senate report. It is recommended by the Bluebook as a citation source.

== History ==
The United States Code Congressional and Administrative News (U.S.C.C.A.N.) is a West Group publication that collects selected congressional and administrative materials for publication in a single resource. U.S.C.C.A.N. was first published in 1941 with the 1st Session of the 77th Congress and has been published with every session of Congress since.

== Content ==
U.S.C.C.A.N. is published in monthly pamphlets that contain a cumulative subject index and cumulative Table of Laws Enacted in addition to the selected documents. The pamphlets are then reissued in bound volumes after each session of Congress concludes. Among other documents, U.S.C.C.A.N. publishes the full text of new federal laws, selected committee reports from the House and Senate, signing statements, presidential proclamations, executive orders, reorganization plans, President's messages, federal regulations, proposed constitutional amendments, federal court rules, and sentencing guidelines all arranged in chronological order.

When published in bound volumes, the legislative history documents are placed in separate volumes apart from the rest of the materials published by U.S.C.C.A.N. Prior to the 99th Congress, the legislative history materials in U.S.C.C.A.N. contained only a House or Senate report. Since the 99th Congress (1985–87), the legislative history materials in U.S.C.C.A.N. have included the House or Senate report, the committee report, and any presidential signing statements. U.S.C.C.A.N. is considered a more readily accessible source for some of these materials, like committee reports, than the originals. As a result, it is recommended by the Bluebook as a citation source in addition to the original document.

== See also ==
- United States Code
