= Title 1 of the Code of Federal Regulations =

US title on general provisions

Title 1 of the Code of Federal Regulations (1 CFR), titled General Provisions, is a United States federal government regulation.

Title 1 comprises one volume, further divided into four chapters. As of the revision of January 1, 2012, the Title includes regulations on the Administrative Committee of the Federal Register (1 CFR Parts 1-22) and the Office of the Federal Register (1 CFR Parts 51), which are responsible for preparing the Federal Register and associated publications, including the Code of Federal Regulations. The Title also codifies regulations for the Administrative Conference of the United States (1 CFR Parts 300-04), the President's Commission on White House Fellowships (1 CFR 425), the National Capital Planning Commission (1 CFR 455-457), and the National Commission for Employment Policy (1 CFR 500).

== Chapter summaries ==
=== Chapter 1: Administrative Committee of the Federal Register ===
Chapter 1 states that, in addition to setting forth the policies, procedures, and delegations under which the Administrative Committee of the Federal Register carries out its general responsibilities under chapter 15 of title 44 of the United States Code, its purpose is "to inform the public of the nature and uses of Federal Register publications."

The Administrative Committee of the Federal Register as established by section 1506 of title 44 of the United States Code consists of:

1. The Archivist, or Acting Archivist, of the United States, who is the Chairman;
2. An officer of the Department of Justice designated by the Attorney General; and,
3. The Public Printer or Acting Public Printer.

The Director of the Federal Register is the Secretary of the Committee.

The Director of the Federal Register is responsible for ensuring the filing of Acts of Congress, Presidential proclamations, and other documents published by the Executive Branch. Acts of Congress are published individually as slip laws, compiled as the United States Statutes at Large, while Executive Branch documents are published daily in the Federal Register and codified in the Code of Federal Regulations. Anyone may reuse or republish material within the Federal Register without restriction. Staff of the Office of the Federal Register may provide information about published documents, but may not substantively interpret them. Documents filed with the Office of the Federal Register are made available for public inspection at their Washington, D.C. office during business hours, and can be photocopied with the appropriate payment of fees.

Subchapter B (1 CFR 1.5-1.6) governs the publication of the Federal Register, including the different categories of documents (presidential proclamations, rules and regulations, proposed rules, and notices), how it is to be published, and what shall and shall not be published within the Federal Register. It also includes information on supplementary documents to be published. Subchapter C requires the publication of "special editions" of the Federal Register. These special editions include the compact Code of Federal Regulations, the United States Government Manual, and the Daily Publication of Presidential Documents. Subchapter D describes the processes for obtaining subscriptions to the Federal Register and associated publications, as well as providing for distribution of these publications within the federal government. Subchapter E governs the specifications for documents to be included in the Federal Register, as well as the processes for preparing them and including them in the Federal Register.

=== Chapter 2: Office of the Federal Register ===
Chapter 2 (1 CFR 51) concerns the incorporation by reference of outside documents into the Federal Register, thereby making them a part of the Federal Register. Regulations include the circumstances under which the Director of the Federal Register will approve incorporation, how to request approval, which publications are eligible, the proper language for citing incorporated publications, and how to change or remove incorporations.

=== Chapter 3: Administrative Conference of the United States ===
Chapter 3 (1 CFR 300-399) addresses the Administrative Conference of the United States (ACUS), an independent agency established by the Administrative Conference Act. The CFR states that the purposes of the ACUS are to facilitate cooperation between the federal government and the general public to ensure that regulations are most effective and infringe on private rights the least. The ACUS also exists to "improve the use of science" and "reduce unnecessary litigation" in the regulatory process.

The Conference consists of a Chairman, appointed by the President with the advice and consent of the United States Senate and ten additional members who, with the Chairman, comprise the Council. Between 75 and 101 individuals serve in the Conference, including government employees and non-government employees who are experts in administrative law or other relevant areas. The Conference is divided into six standing committees: Adjudication, Administration, Public Processes, Judicial Review, Regulation, and Rulemaking. The Conference must meet at least once per year, and no member is paid except for the Chairman.

Chapter 3 describes the various activities that can be undertaken by the Conference, including studies, information interchanges between administrative agencies, and assistance to administrative bodies in other countries with the approval of the Department of State. It also describes the Chairman's authority within the Conference, including the authority to make inquiries and encourage agencies to adopt the recommendations of the Conference.

Part 304 within Chapter 3 describes the procedures for the disclosure of records under the Freedom of Information Act, as well as regulations protecting privacy and access to records under the Privacy Act of 1974.

=== Chapter 4: Miscellaneous Agencies ===
Generally, the regulations in this chapter concern specific activities of the named agencies pursuant to laws enacted by Congress:

- Privacy Act protections are included in Part 425, for applicants to the White House Fellowship program, and in Part 455, for those involved with the National Capital Planning Commission.
- Part 456 contains Freedom of Information Act regulations for the National Capital Planning Commission.
- Parts 457 and 500 contain regulations enforcing Section 504 of the Rehabilitation Act for the National Capital Planning Commission and the National Commission for Employment Policy respectively.

== Applicable court cases ==
In Cervase v. Office of Federal Register (1978), John Cervase, an attorney representing himself, complained that the Office of the Federal Register was required by law to publish an analytic subject index of the Code of Federal Regulations, and their failure to do so impacted his ability to practice law. Cervase's complaint noted that the 164-page table of contents for the 120-volume Code is woefully inadequate. The government argued that since the Administrative Committee of the Federal Register has the responsibility to spell out the specific requirements for publishing the Federal Register, it is beyond judicial review. The district court dismissed the case, but upon appeal to the United States Court of Appeals for the Third Circuit, the case was remanded to the district court for further action. The Court of Appeals acknowledged that under existing regulations, there is a "plain and mandatory duty" for the Office to provide indices, particularly since the Office had not further defined what an "index" was, thus defaulting to the commonly understood definition. Further, Congress intended to allow judicial review of the Office's failure to implement this regulation under Public Law 94-574. Cervase thus had standing to sue the government. However, a dissent filed by Judge Garth noted that a general subject index was available, which satisfied Congress' requirement.

That same year, in United States v. Mowat (1978), the petitioner, Karl Mowat, argued before the United States Court of Appeals for the Ninth Circuit that his conviction for violating a federal regulation was invalid because the regulation in question was not properly published in the Federal Register as required by law. Mowat was accused of violating COMFOURTEEN Instruction 5510.35, a regulation restricting access to Kahoʻolawe Island, Hawaii, which was used by the U.S. military for target practice. The instruction was issued on January 14, 1976, but was not published in the Federal Register until January 4, 1978. The government argued that the instruction did not need to be published, citing a provision in Title 32 of the CFR that says that regulations that are "essentially local in its scope or application" need not be published. However, that same provision requires the publication of "substantive rules of general applicability," as defined in Title 1, despite the provision in Title 32. Because the regulation in question defined a "course of conduct," where violating the regulation would be considered a criminal act, it should have been published. Regardless, in this particular case, the use of the regulation against the defendants was valid, since the defendants knew about it anyway.

A case argued in the United States Tax Court, Jesse S. Frederick v. Commissioner of Internal Revenue (1999), addressed the issue of whether a regulation issued that does not cite a corresponding statute is valid. Frederick argued that such a regulation is not valid, citing 1 CFR 21.40, and that regulations issued pursuant to the Internal Revenue Code are thus invalid. However, Title 1 also says that the lack of citation does not affect a regulation's validity, so the regulations are effective regardless.
