= Regulations.gov =

- Website type: eGovernment
- Website: regulations.gov

Agency overview
- Motto: Your Voice in Federal Decision-Making
- Parent agency: General Services Administration; Office of Government-wide Policy; Office of Regulation Management; eRulemaking Program Management Office

Regulations.gov is a U.S. Federal government web site that acts as an "Internet portal and document repository" that allows members of the public to participate in the rulemaking processes of some Federal government agencies.

The site allows users to make public comments in response to notices of proposed rulemaking issued by participating agencies; such comments become part of the public record and may be displayed on the site.

== See also ==
- Federal Register
- Code of Federal Regulations
- eRulemaking
- Sunlight before signing
