= Title 39 of the Code of Federal Regulations =

American postal service rules

CFR Title 39 - Postal Service is one of fifty titles comprising the United States Code of Federal Regulations (CFR). Title 39 is the principal set of rules and regulations issued by federal agencies of the United States regarding postal service.

== Structure ==
The table of contents, as reflected in the e-CFR updated February 21, 2014, is as follows:

Volume	Chapter	Parts	Regulatory Entity
1	I	1-999	United States Postal Service
	III	3000-3099	Postal Regulatory Commission
