= Sunlight before signing =

Campaign pledge by Barack Obama

Sunlight before signing is an open government campaign pledge made during the Barack Obama 2008 presidential campaign to make non-emergency bills freely available online for a five-day public comment period prior to signing. The campaign promise is a reference to a quote by Supreme Court Justice Louis Brandeis that "Sunlight is said to be the best of disinfectants."

The well-received initiative initially faced technical hurdles in its implementation and had limited follow-through. A review by the Cato Institute found that approximately 62% of non-emergency bills during the first term of the presidency of Barack Obama met the pledge.

== Campaign pledge ==
During the Barack Obama 2008 presidential campaign, Obama advocated for transparent government by pledging to make non-emergency bills freely available online for a five-day public comment period online prior to signing.

It stems from a quote by Supreme Court Justice Louis Brandeis that "Sunlight is said to be the best of disinfectants" in that government transparency would root out corruption akin to sunlight's germicidal properties. The pledge was initially made in Manchester, NH on June 22, 2007.

At a campaign rally, Obama pitched the open government initiative:

I'll make our government open and transparent, so that anyone can ensure that our business is the people's business. Justice Louis Brandeis once said "sunlight is the greatest disinfectant", and as president I'm going to make it impossible for congressmen or lobbyists to slip pork barrel projects or corporate welfare into laws when no one's looking, because when I'm president, meetings where laws are written will be more open to the public. No more secrecy; that's a commitment I make to you as president. [Applause] No more secrecy. [Applause] And when there's a bill that ends up on my desk as president, you, the public, will have five days to look online and find out what's in it before I sign it, [Applause] so that you know what your government's doing. When there are meetings between lobbyists and a government agency, we'll put as many of those meetings as possible online for every American to watch. When there's a tax bill being debated in Congress, you will know the names of the corporations that would benefit and how much money they would get, and we will put every corporate tax break and every pork barrel project online for every American to see. You will know who asked for them, and you can decide whether your representative is actually representing you. [Applause]

— Barack Obama 2008 presidential campaign

A 2008 campaign brochure described the Sunlight Before Signing initiative as follows:

Too often bills are rushed through Congress and to the president before the public has the opportunity to review them. As president, Barack Obama will not sign any non-emergency bill without giving the American public an opportunity to review and give input on the White House website for five days. In addition to ensuring that the public has the ability to review legislation, the sunlight will help ensure that earmarks tucked into appropriations bills are exposed. And Obama will sign legislation in the light of day without attaching signing statements that undermine the legislative intent.

— Barack Obama 2008 presidential campaign

== Implementation ==
In 2009, when a congressional bill passed, a link would be posted to the Library of Congress. Obama sought to have links to the bills and associated discussion posted to the White House website, Whitehouse.gov. There were a number of technical hurdles that had to be overcome to make it feasible. Initially, links were posted on orphaned subpages of Whitehouse.gov domain, only accessible via keywords using the website's internal search engine and not discoverable via the sitemap or an external search engine, thus rendering them inaccessible. Eventually, separate sections for pending, signed, and vetoed legislation were added to the White House Web site along with an RSS feed, enabling citizens to track new bills.

The Lily Ledbetter Fair Pay Act was the first bill signed into law by U.S. President Barack Obama following his first week in office on January 29, 2009, and was not posted until after the signing. The second bill, Children's Health Insurance Reauthorization Act of 2009, was also signed before being posted. The lack of delay for the initial presidency was attributed in part to trying to build political momentum. A review by the Cato Institute found that approximately 62% of non-emergency bills during the first term of the presidency of Barack Obama met the sunlight before signing pledge.

The Sunlight before signing pledge was added to the Change.gov ethics agenda listing. The initiative was well-received, but was found to have inconsistent follow-through.

== Aftermath ==
Though the promise was well-intentioned, its implementation as-is would have limited impact as commenting on a passed bill is largely meaningless. As such, there was an effort to get bills posted online, earlier in the process.

In May 2009, the website Data.gov was launched as part of the open government initiative. Obama's focus on open government led to an increased interest in civic technology.

A similar legislative reform initiative, known as the Read the Bill, was advocated by the Sunlight Foundation for implementing a 72-hour hold on new bills, allowing congressional staff time to read them before voting.

== See also ==
- eRulemaking
- Regulations.gov
- Sunlight Foundation
- Sunshine Week
