= Title 35 of the Code of Federal Regulations =

U.S. federal rules and regulations on the Panama Canal

Title 35 of the Code of Federal Regulations (35 CFR) was a United States federal government regulation on the Panama Canal. The U.S. controlled the Panama Canal Zone from 1904 to 1999. The Torrijos–Carter Treaties provided for handover to Panama. After a period of joint American–Panamanian control, the canal was taken over by the Panamanian government in 1999, and is now operated by the Panama Canal Authority, a Panamanian government agency.

Title 35 title last appeared in the 2000 revision of the CFR, and has since been withdrawn.
