= Title 37 of the Code of Federal Regulations =

U.S. federal rules and regulations on patents, trademarks, and copyrights

CFR Title 37 - Patents, Trademarks, and Copyrights is one of fifty titles comprising the United States Code of Federal Regulations (CFR). Title 37 is the principal set of rules and regulations issued by federal agencies of the United States regarding patents, trademarks, and copyrights. It is available in digital and printed form, and can be referenced online using the Electronic Code of Federal Regulations (e-CFR).

== Structure ==
The table of contents, as reflected in the e-CFR updated February 21, 2014, is as follows:

Volume	Chapter	Parts	Regulatory Entity
1	I	1-199	Patent and Trademark Office, Department of Commerce
	II	200-299	Copyright Office, Library of Congress
	III	300-399	Copyright Royalty Board, Library of Congress
	IV	400-501	National Institute of Standards and Technology, Department of Commerce
	V		[Reserved]
