= Notice of proposed rulemaking =

Public notice

A notice of proposed rulemaking (NPRM) is a public notice that is issued by law when a U.S. federal agency wishes to add, remove, or change a rule or regulation as part of the rulemaking process. The notice is an important part of US administrative law, which facilitates government by typically creating a process of taking of public comment. The term is also used at the state level in the United States.

== Procedure ==
Although it is not required by the US Constitution, federal agencies are required to publish NPRMs before finalizing regulations, as required by section 553 of the Administrative Procedure Act (APA). The US Congress created the requirement to enlighten agencies and to force them to listen to comments and concerns of people who will likely be affected by the regulation. The Federal Aviation Administration, Federal Communications Commission, National Telecommunications and Information Administration, and Environmental Protection Agency are examples of regulatory agencies subject to the NPRM requirements.

An NPRM is published in the Federal Register and typically allows 60 days for public comment from any interested party and an additional 30 days for reply comments. Original comments may still be filed within the reply comments time window. While that is the normal method of agency rulemaking, the APA allows for emergency rulemakings that may bypass the NPRM process. The agency must disclose its reason when publishing the final rule. In certain cases a notice is not required to be published in the Federal Register if all persons subject to it are named and personally served with a copy of it.

Each notice, whether published in the Federal Register or personally served, includes:

1. A statement of the time, place, and nature of the proposed rulemaking proceeding;
2. A reference to the authority under which it is issued;
3. A description of the subjects and issues involved or the substance and terms of the proposed regulation;
4. A statement of the time within which written comments must be submitted; and
5. A statement of how and to what extent interested persons may participate in the proceeding.

== Notice of inquiry / Advanced notice of proposed rulemaking ==
NPRMs may be preceded by a notice of inquiry (NOI) or an advanced notice of proposed rulemaking (ANPRM), in which comments are invited but no rules have yet been proposed. Comments and data received by an agency in such a preliminary period allow it to better prepare its NPRM by making more-informed decisions on proposals. Some agencies may publish a "Further notice of proposed rulemaking" (FNPRM) after an NPRM, if the comments from the initial NPRM lead the agency to change the proposal drastically to the point that further comment is required. Final rules are labeled as "Final rule" in some agencies, or "Report and order" (R&O) in others. In some cases agencies may publish additional R&O notices when conducting a continuing proceeding (such as the DTV transition).

The federal government established its Regulations.gov website in 2002 to provide better public access to the rulemaking process.

== Foreign equivalents ==
Equivalent procedures of public consultation are also used outside the United States for a document giving public notice of a proposed rule change and inviting informed comment on it. The European Aviation Safety Agency publishes similar notices referred to a "Notice of proposed amendment" when it seeks public comment.

== See also ==
- Request for Comments (RFC) in Internet governance.
