= Title 43 of the Code of Federal Regulations =

U.S. federal rules and regulations on public lands (Dept. of the Interior)

CFR Title 43 - Public Lands: Interior is one of fifty titles comprising the United States Code of Federal Regulations (CFR). Title 43 is the principal set of rules and regulations issued by federal agencies of the United States regarding public lands under the jurisdiction of the Department of the Interior. It is available in digital and printed form, and can be referenced online using the Electronic Code of Federal Regulations (e-CFR).

== Structure ==
The table of contents, as reflected in the e-CFR updated February 19, 2014, is as follows:

Volume	Chapter	Parts	Regulatory Entity
1		1-199	Subtitle A-Office of the Secretary of the Interior
	I	400-999	Bureau of Reclamation, Department of the Interior
2	II	1000-9999	Bureau of Land Management, Department of the Interior
	III	10000-10099	Utah Reclamation Mitigation and Conservation Commission
