= Title 44 of the Code of Federal Regulations =

U.S. federal rules and regulations on emergency management

CFR Title 44 – Emergency Management and Assistance is one of 50 titles in the United States Code of Federal Regulations (CFR). Title 44 is the principal set of rules and regulations issued by federal agencies of the United States regarding emergency management and assistance.

== Structure ==
The table of contents, as reflected in the e-CFR updated February 19, 2014, is as follows:

Volume	Chapter	Parts	Regulatory Entity
1	I	0-399	Federal Emergency Management Agency, Department of Homeland Security
	IV	400-499	Department of Commerce and Department of Transportation
