= Title 36 of the Code of Federal Regulations =

United States regulation

CFR Title 36 - Parks, Forests, and Public Property is one of fifty titles comprising the United States Code of Federal Regulations (CFR). Title 36 is the principal set of rules and regulations issued by federal agencies of the United States regarding parks, forests, and public property. It is available in digital and printed form, and can be referenced online using the Electronic Code of Federal Regulations (e-CFR).

== Structure ==
The table of contents, as reflected in the e-CFR updated February 28, 2014, is as follows:

Volume	Chapter	Parts	Regulatory Entity
1	I	1-199	National Park Service, Department of the Interior
2	II	200-299	Forest Service, Department of Agriculture
3	III	300-399	Corps of Engineers, Department of the Army
	IV	400-499	American Battle Monuments Commission
	V	500-599	Smithsonian Institution
	VII	700-799	Library of Congress
	VIII	800-899	Advisory Council on Historic Preservation
	IX	900-999	Pennsylvania Avenue Development Corporation
	X	1000-1099	Presidio Trust
	XI	1100-1199	Architectural and Transportation Barriers Compliance Board
	XII	1200-1299	National Archives and Records Administration
	XV	1500-1599	Oklahoma City National Memorial Trust
	XVI	1600-1699	Morris K. Udall Scholarship and Excellence in National Environmental Policy Foundation
