= ERulemaking =

Electronic rulemaking (also known as eRulemaking and e-rulemaking) is the use of digital technologies by government agencies in the rulemaking and decision making processes of the United States. An interdisciplinary electronic rulemaking research community has formed as a result of National Science Foundation funding under the auspices of the Digital Government Program. Groups such as the Cornell E-Rulemaking Initiative (CeRI) have been focused on researching how technologies such as Web 2.0 can help foster greater public participation in the political process, specifically, in Federal Agencies’ rulemaking.

== Background ==
In the United States, Electronic rulemaking (also known as eRulemaking and e-rulemaking) can be understood as a subset of a larger Federal eGovernment initiative. In the 1990s Federal Agencies that propose and enact regulations, such as the Department of Transportation (DOT) and Federal Communications Commission (FCC), began to modernize and create websites for publication of proposed regulations and online commenting from the public.

President George W. Bush made strides in increasing e-Government. Under President Bush, Congress passed the Honest Leadership and Open Government Act, which among other things, required agencies to accept comments electronically and make various information, including comments and rulemaking materials, publicly available online.

Since 2008, President Barack Obama has greatly increased the number of Federal eGovernment initiatives.

== 2009 initiatives and reforms ==
During the Barack Obama 2008 presidential campaign, Barack Obama made the Sunlight before signing campaign pledge to make non-emergency bills freely available online for a five day public comment period prior to signing. In 2009, President Barack Obama made the directed government agencies to utilize new technologies such as Web 2.0 and other information technology to increase transparency and openness in government. Soon after, the Office of Management and Budget (OMB) issued a memorandum to the Federal Agencies reiterating three open government principles, “transparency, participation, and collaboration,” identified by the President. OMB gave agencies four months to create an “open government plan,” which would address each “cornerstone” of open government.

OMB gave details on how to address each cornerstone. For “transparency,” the agencies were required to publish “high-value” data and other information in an “open” format, and “inform the public of significant actions and business of [the] agency.” To address “participation,” agencies were required to openly link to sites where the public could “actively participate,” and to “include proposals for new feedback mechanisms, including innovative tools and practices that create new and easier methods for public engagement.” Finally, to address “collaboration,” agencies were required to “include proposals to use technology platforms to improve collaboration among people within and outside your agency,” and use innovative methods to increase collaboration.

In addition to addressing the “cornerstones,” agencies were required to identify a “flagship initiative.” The flagship initiative had to be “at least one specific, new transparency, participation, or collaboration initiative that your agency is currently implementing (or that will be implemented before the next update of the Open Government Plan).”

== Third party e-rulemaking initiatives ==
=== Cornell e-Rulemaking Initiative ===
Cornell University has started a multidisciplinary collaboration known as the Cornell eRulemaking Initiative, or CeRI. Backed by a National Science Foundation grant, CeRI has begun researching and applying Web 2.0 technologies in a political setting. The group includes faculty and students from Computing and Information Science, Law, and the Scheinman Institute on Conflict Resolution. CeRI uses an interdisciplinary approach to discover and apply Web 2.0 and other technologies to “improve public understanding of, and participation in, rulemaking.”

In 2009, CeRI launched the site RegulationRoom.org. The site, which is hosted by the Legal Information Institute, is an independent non-governmental online community that allows users to read, comment, and discuss proposed regulations from federal agencies. Professors and students at Cornell Law School summarize the relevant parts of the agency’s proposed regulation, and post the information on the site. Once the proposed rule has been posted, users are able to comment, discuss, and critique the agency’s proposal. At the close of a rule’s comment period, Regulation Room moderators summarize the comments and submit this summary to the Agency as an official comment.

Although CeRI and Regulation Room are research projects unaffiliated with the federal government, In 2010, the DOT partnered with CeRI as part of the White House Open Government Initiative. The purpose of the partnership is to “discover the best ways of using Web 2.0 and social networking technologies to further rulemaking efforts.” DOT has selected Regulation Room as its flagship initiative under the Open Government Directive.

Similar open government initiatives have been launched at other federal agencies.

Since launching in 2009, RegulationRoom.org has hosted four “live” rules from the DOT. These rules included:

- DOT – Texting: The rule, which closed to commenting on January 10, 2010, dealt with the DOT’s proposal to regulate texting by commercial motor vehicle operators. The rule received 48 comments on Regulation Room.
- DOT - Airline Passenger Rights: The rule, which closed on September 23, 2010, dealt with the DOT’s proposed regulations for airline passenger rights. Regulation room received over 19,000 visitors and over 900 comments.
- DOT - Electronic Onboard Recorders: The rule, which closed on May 23, 2011, was a proposal to require commercial truck drivers with multiple operating violations to use electronic onboard recorders. The rule received over one-hundred comments.
- DOT – Air Travel Accessibility: The rule, which closed on January 9, 2012, was a proposal to require airlines to make their websites and airport kiosks accessible to travelers with disabilities.

== See also ==
- Cyberocracy
- Government by algorithm
- e-Government
- Quicksilver initiatives
