= List of CFR Sections Affected =

The List of CFR Sections Affected (LSA) is a monthly United States government publication that lists amendments to the Code of Federal Regulations (CFR) that have been published in the Federal Register (FR). Entries are by CFR title, chapter, part and section. Proposed rules are listed at the end of appropriate titles.

== LSA at a Glance ==
The CFR is revised annually according to the following schedule:

- Titles 1–16 - as of Jan. 1
- 17–27 - as of April 1
- 28–41 - as of July 1
- 42–50 - as of Oct. 1

To bring these regulations up to date, consult the most recent LSA for any changes, additions, or removals published after the revision date of the volume you are using. Then check the Cumulative list of parts affected appearing in the Reader Aids of the latest Federal Register for less detailed but timely changes published after the final date included in this publication.

The page numbers listed to the right of each LSA entry indicated where the specific amendments begin in the Federal Register. Boldface page numbers under a particular title indicate that the page numbers span 2 years. Boldface is used to distinguish the previous year from the current year.
