= GovInfo =

Official U.S. government website

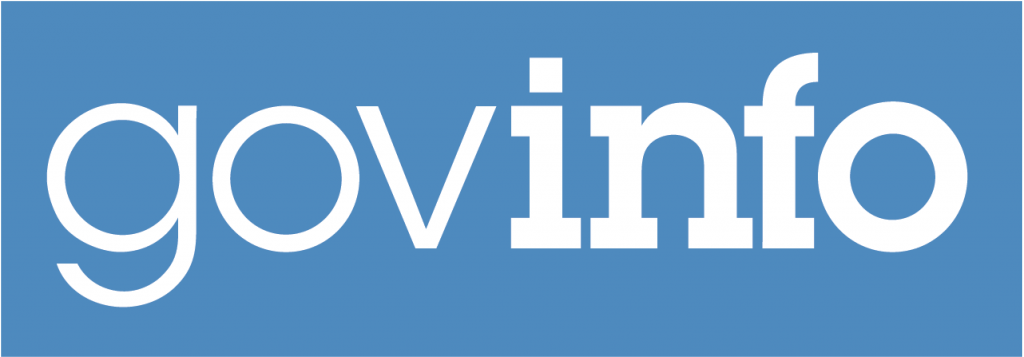
- Logo used since 2016
- Available in: English
- Owner: U.S. Government Publishing Office
- Website: govinfo.gov

GovInfo is an official website of the United States government that houses U.S. government information. GovInfo replaces the Federal Digital System (FDsys), which in turn replaces GPOAccess, an information storage system to house electronic government documents with a modern information management system.

GovInfo.gov authenticates, preserves and provides permanent public access to federal government documents. The system automates the collection, management and dissemination of electronic information from all three branches of the federal government. The goal is to have a complete historical record of all federal government documents from the founding of the United States to the present.

In 2009, GovInfo's predecessor FDsys was named by Government Computer News as one of the best government Web sites.

The American Recovery and Reinvestment Act of 2009 (the Stimulus Package) and President Obama's first budget were made available within the first few months of the launch of FDsys. The Office of the Federal Register’s (OFR) publication, Daily Compilation of Presidential Documents, was specifically engineered for FDsys. This publication contains information released by The White House Press Office regarding orders, statements and remarks made by the President.

== See also ==
- PACER (law)
