= New Hampshire Code of Administrative Rules =

Administrative law body

The New Hampshire Code of Administrative Rules is a body of administrative law of the U.S. state of New Hampshire. The Administrative Rules in the Code are enacted by state agencies pursuant to the rulemaking authority granted by the New Hampshire General Court. The Code serves to supplement the Revised Statutes Annotated by allowing agencies to further develop a statute or to impose a general requirement legally binding on the state.

== Joint Legislative Committee on Administrative Rules ==
Upon grant of rulemaking authority by the legislature, an agency is obliged to follow the requirements of the state Administrative Procedure Act (APA). Legislative oversight of the rulemaking process is provided by the Joint Legislative Committee on Administrative Rules (JLCAR). The membership of the JLCAR is composed of 5 members of the State Senate and 5 members of the House of Representatives, with 5 alternates from each chamber to fill in for absent members. Every 2 years the Senate members are appointed by the President of the Senate, and the House members by the Speaker of the House. No more than 3 regular members, and 3 alternate members, from each chamber may be from the same party.

The JLCAR may approve, conditionally approve, or object to final agency proposals or proposed interim rules. JLCAR approval is not required except for a proposed interim rule. Agencies may amend a proposed rule in response to an objection and still seek JLCAR approval, or the agency may withdraw the rule. The JLCAR may not object to an emergency rule but may petition for its repeal if the agency has not demonstrated that the rule is necessary to prevent an imminent peril to the public health or safety. An agency may not adopt a proposed regular rule after responding to an objection until the JLCAR has had an opportunity to examine the response and decide whether to approve the rule, make a final objection, or vote to support the introduction of a joint resolution. A final objection by the JLCAR is not a veto nor does it delay adoption of a rule, but it does shift the burden of proof to the agency on the lawfulness of the rule in a court challenge or court enforcement action of the rule.
