= Quicksilver initiatives =

Quicksilver Initiatives is a term coined by the Bush administration in The President's Management Agenda between the years 2001 and 2002. President Bush's agenda was characterized by its presenting of fourteen different "areas of improvement" in federal government. The fourth of those areas was labeled "Expanded Electronic Government" and it was with regards to President Bush administration's intended transformation in e-governance. The quicksilver initiatives "marked the beginning of the era of full-scale e-government at the federal level."

President Bush presented the quicksilver initiatives as a strategy to reach his administration's goal of providing a larger number of services to a greater number of people at lower costs via electronic means. This process of transformation sought to shift the attention of governmental information technology from providing services within and among agencies to providing services to the public. It is, making "networks rather than agencies become primary" as it relates to public services.

As a first step, the Clinton administration's concept of e-government was adopted by President Bush's government. It re-recreated, developed and implemented the existing FirstGov initiative along with a group of other twenty four projects that constitute the now so-called quicksilver initiatives.

== Quicksilver Initiatives Individual Purpose ==
The following is a list of the twenty five Quicksilver Initiatives and their purpose

=== Government to Citizen ===
1. USA Service: Allow citizens to personalize their governmental services under secured environments
2. EZ Tax Filing: Electronic filling of Tax returns
3. Online Access for Loans: Finding loans for education
4. Recreation One Stop: Access to information regarding national and state parks
5. Eligibility Assistance Online: Verifying eligibility for programs funded by the federal government

=== Government to Business ===
1. Federal Asset Sales: Allow governmental agencies to put up for sale government property
2. Online Rulemaking Management: Permit private businesses to comment and monitor projected rules and regulations
3. Simplified and Unified Tax and Wage Reporting System: Facilitating private organizations compliance with federal laws and regulations permitting them to e-file wage forms
4. Consolidated Health Informatics: Centralized database of medical information
5. One Stop Business Compliance: Facilitating private organizations compliance with federal laws and regulations permitting them to e-file documents
6. International Trade Process Streamlining: Support export-import processes through a combination of twenty sites

=== Government to Government ===
1. E-Vital: Accessibility to vital records to governmental agencies
2. E-Grants: Combine federal grant services online
3. Disaster Assistance and Crisis Response: Coordinating private and public disaster preparedness, prevention and relief services
4. Geospatial Information One Stop: Making Geospatial information available to national and state agencies
5. Safecom: Implementing coordinated Wireless projects programs for state and national agencies

=== Internal Effectiveness/Efficiency ===
1. E-Training: Centralized site for governmental training
2. Recruitment One Stop: Improvement of the site www.usajobs.opm.gov
3. Enterprise Human Resources Integration: Centralize human resources information at the federal level
4. Integrated Acquisition Environment: Integrating acquisition functions common to different agencies
5. E-Records Management: Creating and implementing policies to regulate maintenance, storage and archive of federal records electronically
6. E-Clearance: Consolidate and centralize government officials' security clearance
7. E-Payroll: Merging twenty two federal payroll systems in two partnerships
8. E-Travel: Providing travel services online

=== Crosscutting ===
1. E-Authentication: Governmental organizations are permitted to verify the identity of users of government websites
