= Federal agency =

Federal agency may refer to:

- United States federal agencies—see List of federal agencies in the United States
- Federal agency (Germany)

== See also ==
- Government agency
- Intelligence agency
- Statutory corporation
- Statutory Agency
- Crown corporation
- Government-owned corporation
- Regulatory agency
- Public bodies
- Non-departmental public body
