= Neal Sonnett =

American lawyer

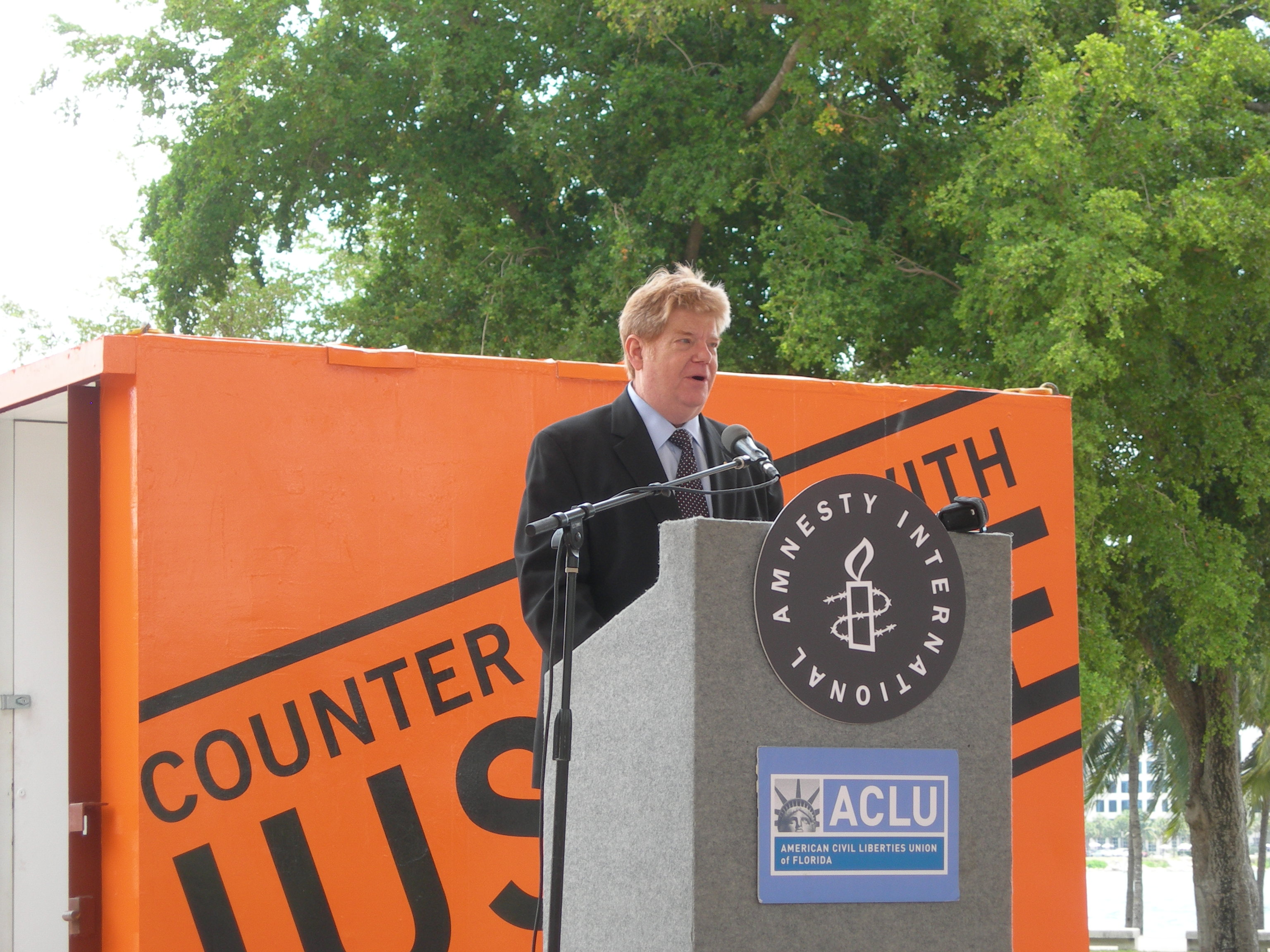
Neal Sonnett speaking at an Amnesty International event in 2008

Neal Sonnett is a former Assistant U.S. Attorney.

Sonnett was the 1989 winner of the Robert C. Heeney Memorial Award and in 2008 the American Bar Association Senior Lawyers Division presented him with the John H. Pickering Award Of Achievement. He was the American Bar Association observer at Guantanamo.
