= United States Government Publishing Office =

Printing and binding agency of the U.S. federal government

Government Publishing Office
- Official seal

- Logo

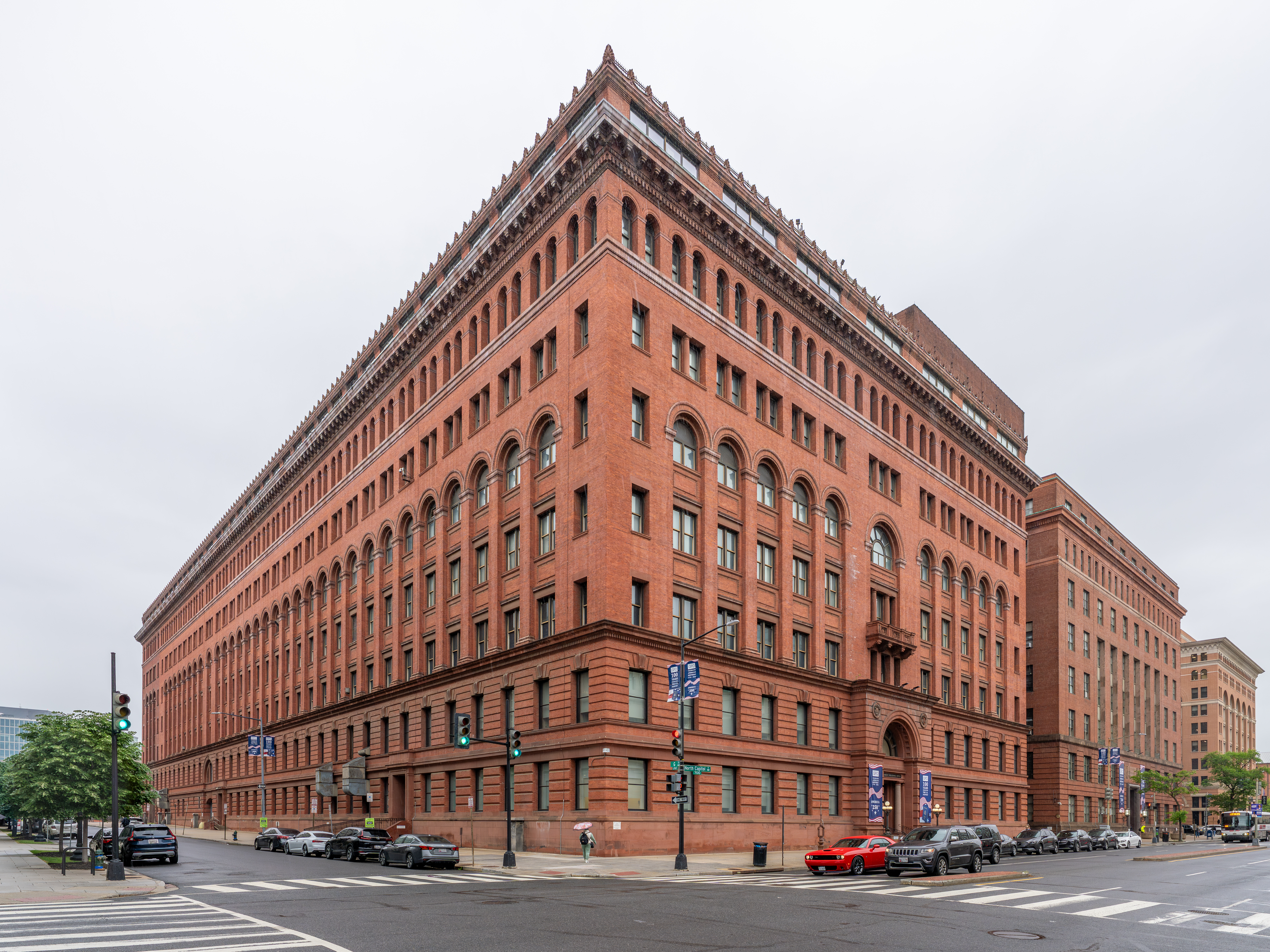
- Headquarters in Washington, D.C. (2026)

Agency overview
- Formed: March 4, 1861
- Jurisdiction: Federal government of the United States
- Headquarters: 732 North Capitol St. NW Washington, D.C.
- Motto: "Keeping America Informed"
- Employees: 1,644 (2025)
- Annual budget: US$126,200,000 (2012); approx. US$135 million (2011)
- Agency executive: Hugh Halpern, Director
- Parent agency: United States Congress Joint Committee on Printing
- Website: gpo.gov

The United States Government Publishing Office (USGPO or GPO), formerly the United States Government Printing Office, is an agency of the legislative branch of the United States federal government. The office produces and distributes information products and services for all three branches of the federal government, including U.S. passports for the Department of State as well as the official publications of the Supreme Court, Congress, the Executive Office of the President, executive departments, and independent agencies.

An act of Congress changed the office's name to its current form in 2014.

== History ==
=== Establishment of the Government Printing Office ===
The Government Printing Office was created by congressional joint resolution (12 Stat. 117) on June 23, 1860. It began operations March 4, 1861, with 350 employees and reached a peak employment of 8,500 in 1972. The agency began transformation to computer technology in the 1980s; along with the gradual replacement of paper with electronic document distribution, this has led to a steady decline in the number of staff at the agency.

=== Headquarters and unique architecture ===
For its entire history, the GPO has occupied the corner of North Capitol Street NW and H Street NW in the District of Columbia. The large red brick building that houses the GPO was erected in 1903 and is unusual in being one of the few large, red brick government structures in a city where most government buildings are mostly marble and granite. (The Smithsonian Castle and the Pension Building, now the National Building Museum, are other exceptions.) An additional structure was attached to its north in later years.

=== Role and structure of the GPO ===
The activities of the GPO are defined in the public printing and documents chapters of Title 44 of the United States Code. The Director (formerly the Public Printer), who serves as the head of the GPO, is appointed by the President with the advice and consent of the Senate. The Director selects a Superintendent of Documents.

=== Superintendent of Documents and information dissemination ===
The Superintendent of Documents (SuDocs) is in charge of the dissemination of information at the GPO. This is accomplished through the Federal Depository Library Program (FDLP), the Cataloging and Indexing Program and the Publication Sales Program, as well as operation of the Federal Citizen Information Center in Pueblo, Colorado. Adelaide Hasse was the founder of the Superintendent of Documents classification system.

=== Environmentally conscious initiatives ===
The GPO first used 100 percent recycled paper for the Congressional Record and Federal Register from 1991 to 1997, under Public Printers Robert Houk and Michael DiMario. The GPO resumed using recycled paper in 2009.

=== Official histories ===
The GPO has release several books over years that recount its history. One of the first books, History of the Government Printing Office (at Washington D. C.), was released in 1881. 100 GPO Years 1861–1961 was first released in 1961 on the centennial of the office's creation describing its first hundred years of existence,. and reprinted in 2010.

In March 2011, the GPO issued a new illustrated official history celebrating 150 years, titled Keeping America Informed. A revised version was release five years later in 2016. A picture book, Picturing the Big Shop, was released in 2017.

=== Name change and shift to digital publishing ===
With demand for print publications falling and a move underway to digital document production and preservation, the name of the GPO was officially changed to "Government Publishing Office" in a provision of an omnibus government funding bill passed by Congress in December 2014. Following signature of this legislation by President Barack Obama, the name change took place on December 17, 2014.

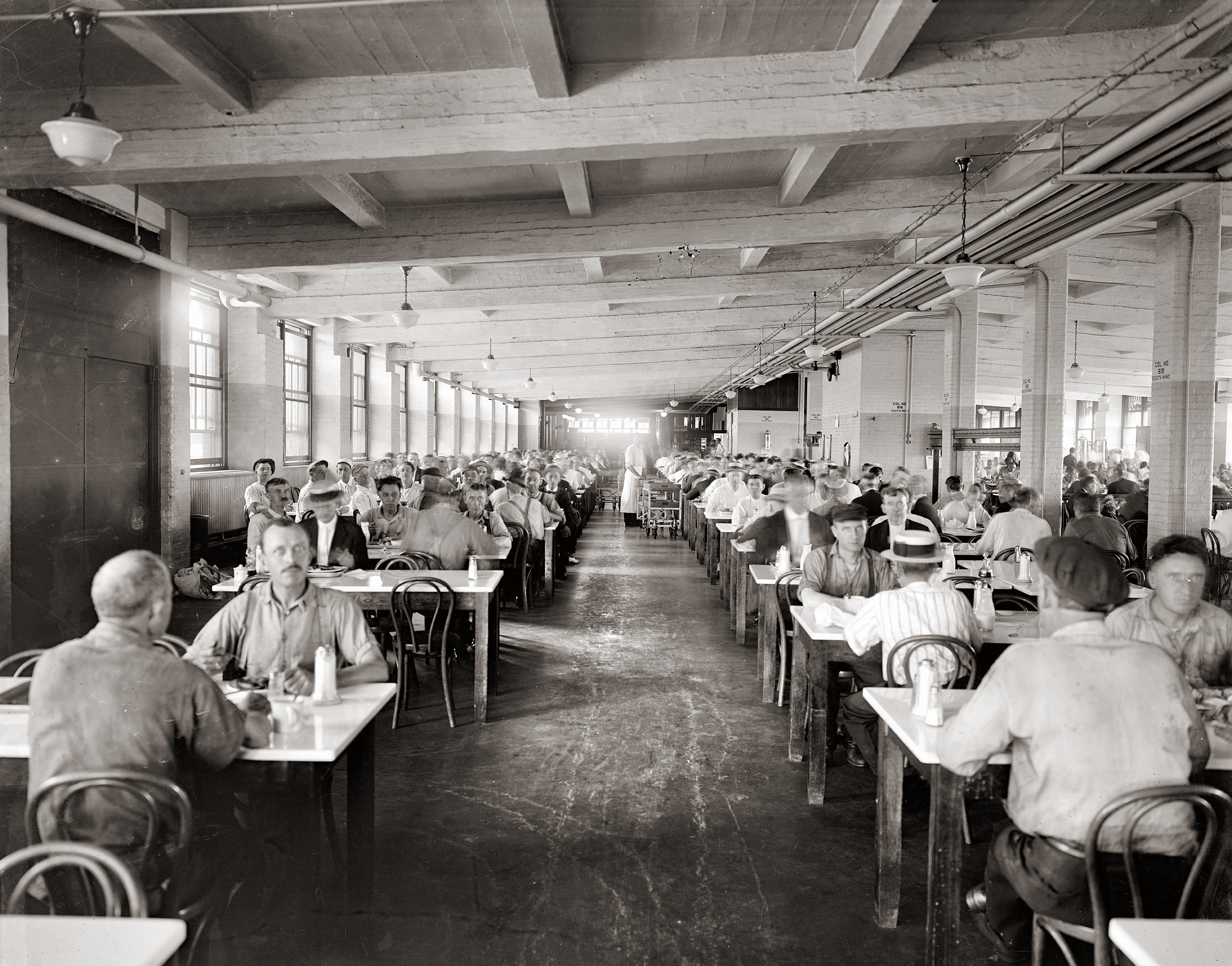
Government Printing Office, the restaurant in 1922

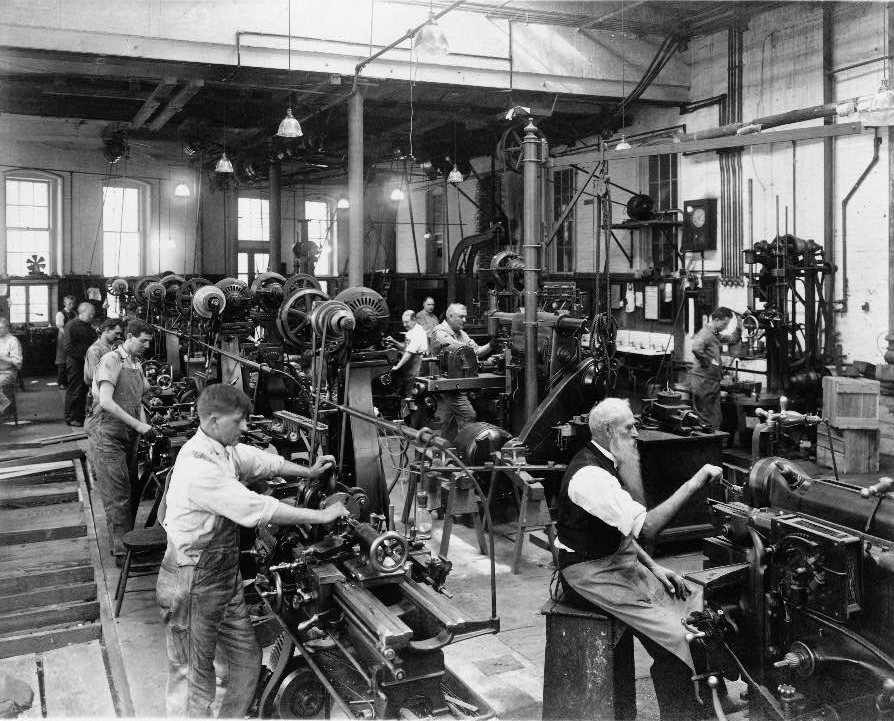
Machine shop in the Government Printing Office

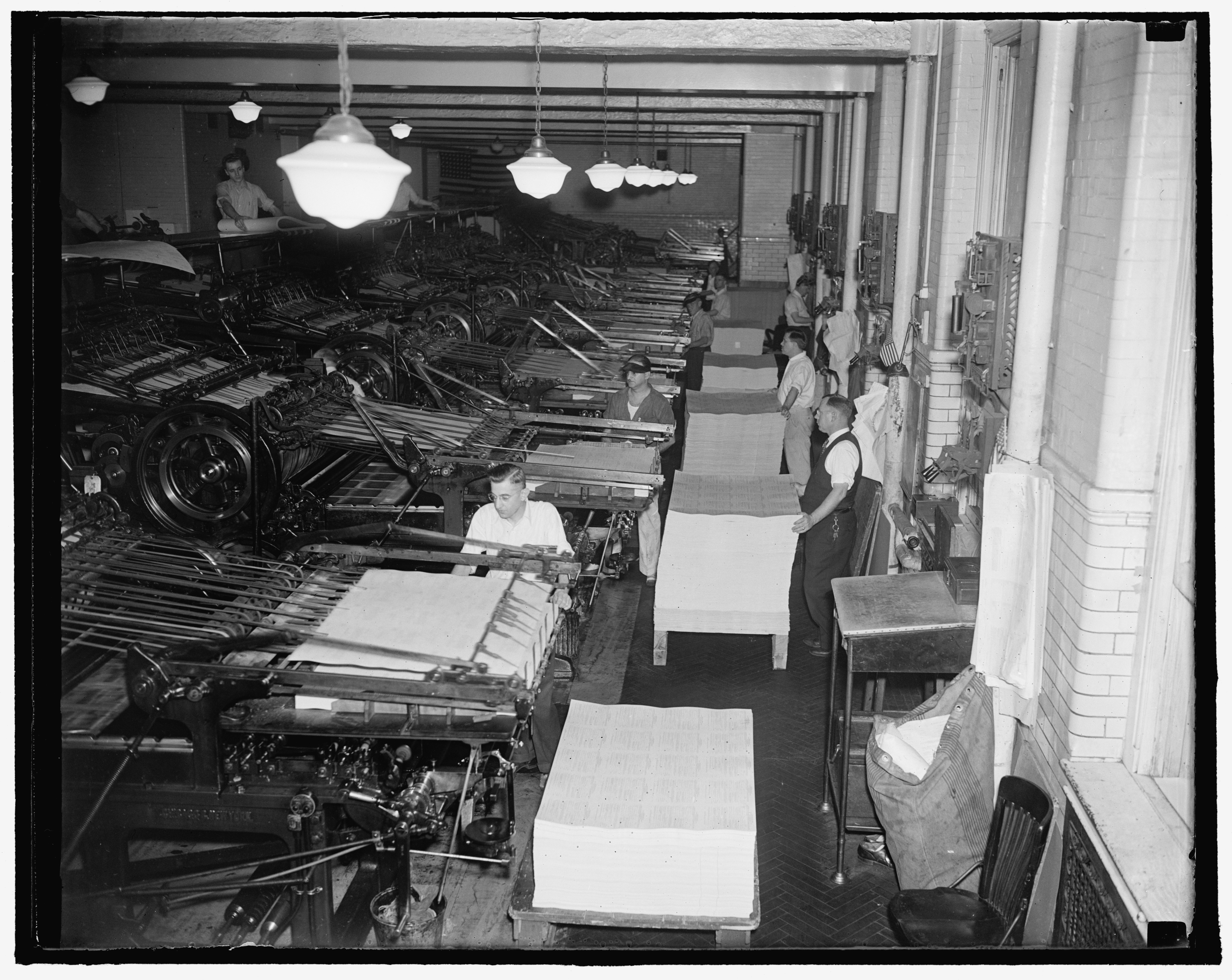
Scene at the Government Printing Office where 3,000,000 unemployment census questionnaires are being printed daily in 1937

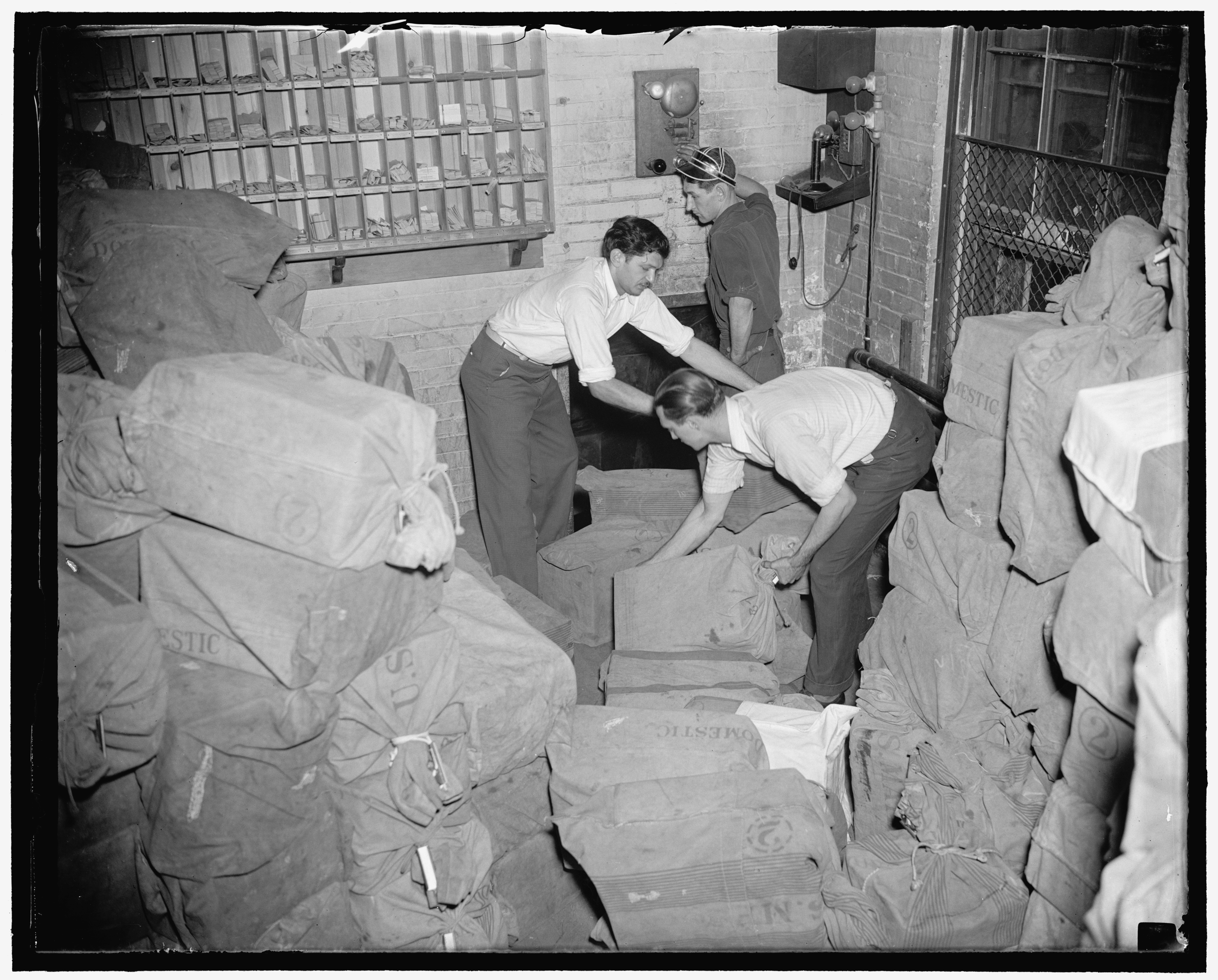
The mailroom in 1937

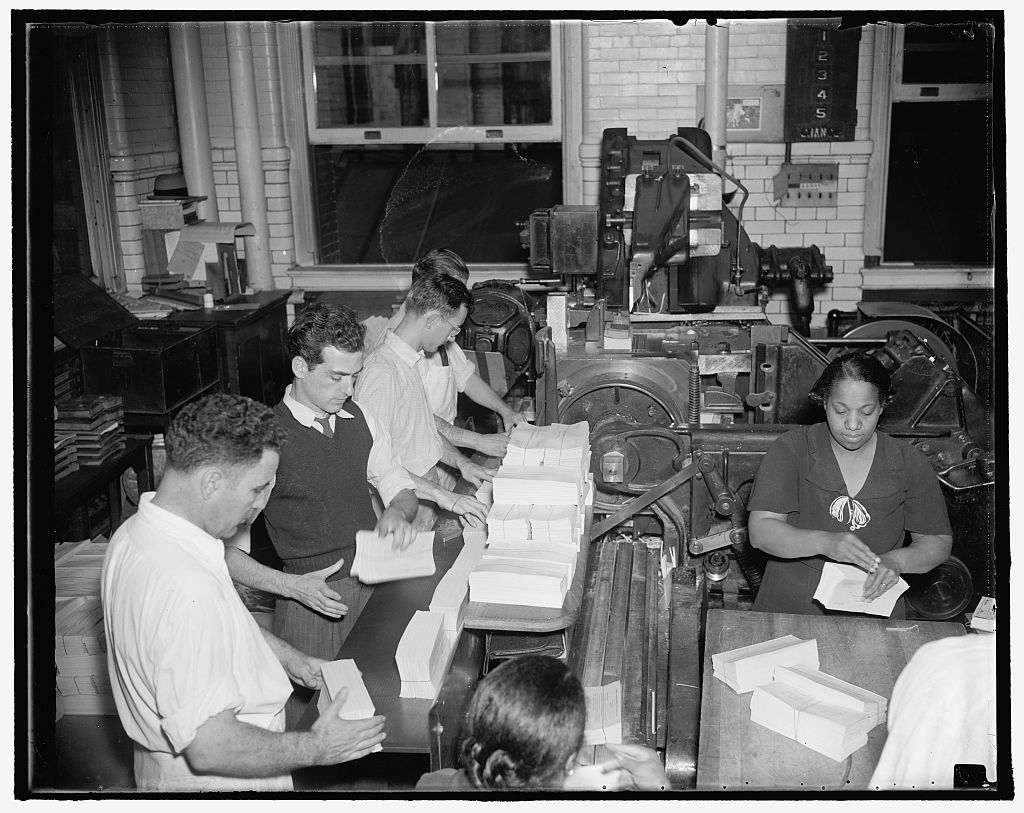
As rapidly as the presses in the Government Printing Office print the unemployment census blanks, workers trim and mail.

== GPO directors of the United States ==
Until 2014, the Public Printer headed the GPO. The position of Public Printer traces its roots back to Benjamin Franklin and the period before the American Revolution, when he served as "publick printer", whose job was to produce official government documents for Pennsylvania and other colonies. When the agency was renamed in December 2014 the title "Public Printer" was also changed to "Director". Davita Vance-Cooks was therefore the first "Director" of the GPO.

The list of leaders for this governmental unit is located at Director of the U.S. Government Publishing Office#List of leaders.

== Published government documents ==
=== Official journals of government ===
The GPO contracts out much of the Federal government's printing but prints the official journals of government in-house,

- Public and Private Laws
- The Congressional Record
- The Federal Register, which is the official daily publication for rules, proposed rules, and notices of Federal agencies and organizations.
- United States House Journal
- United States Senate Journal
- United States Code
- United States Statutes at Large

=== Passports ===
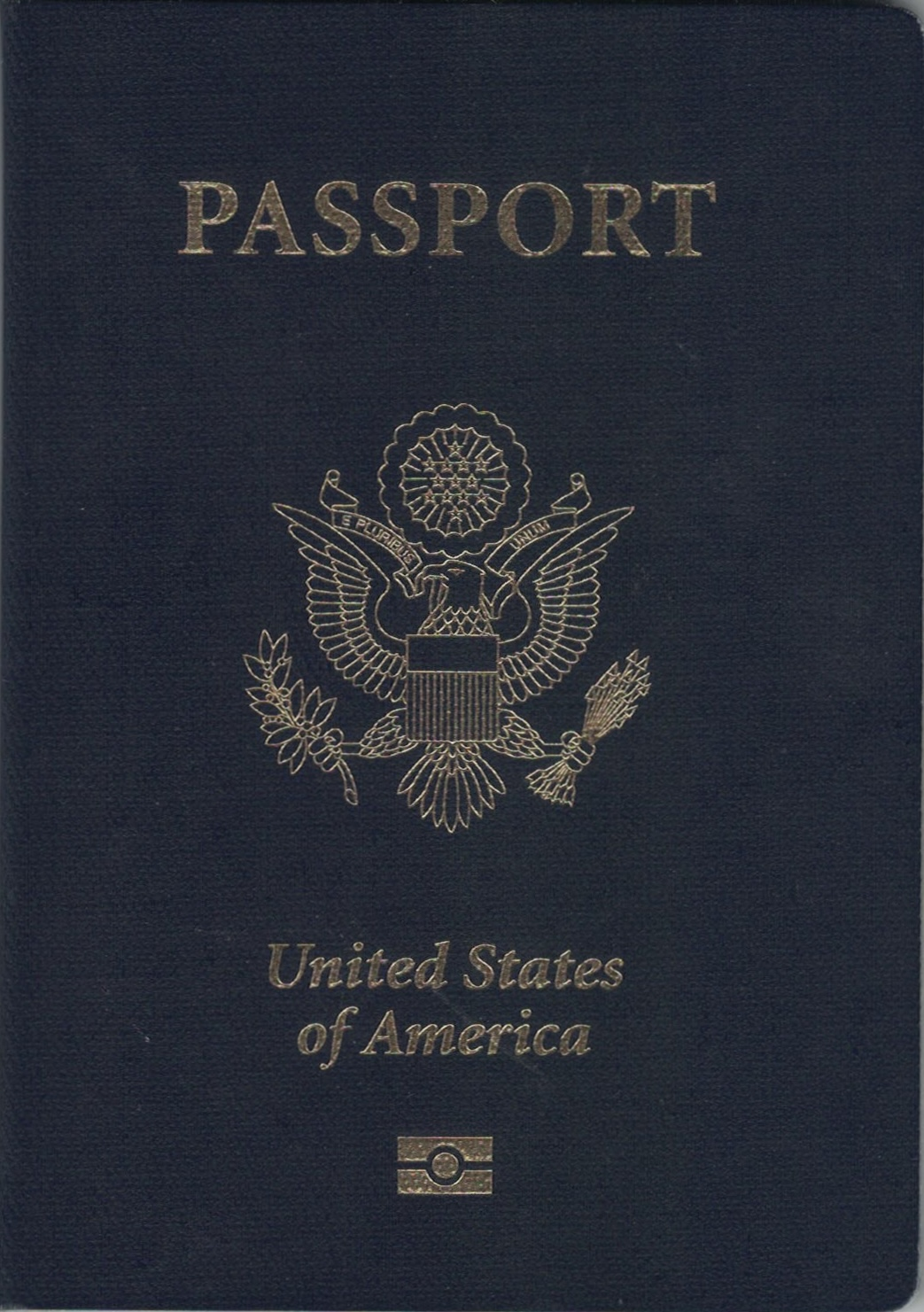
The new e-passport produced by GPO

GPO has been producing U.S. passports since the 1920s. The United States Department of State began issuing e-passports in 2006. The e-Passport includes an electronic chip embedded in the cover that contains the same information that is printed in the passport: name, date and place of birth, sex, dates of passport issuance and expiration, passport number, and photo of the bearer. GPO produces the blank e-Passport, while the Department of State receives and adjudicates applications and issues individual passports. GPO ceased production of legacy passports in May 2007, shifting production entirely to e-passports.

In March 2008, the Washington Times published a three-part story about the outsourcing of electronic passports to overseas companies, including one in Thailand that was subject to Chinese espionage.

=== Trusted Traveler Program card ===
GPO designs, prints, encodes, and personalizes Trusted Traveler Program cards (NEXUS, SENTRI and FAST) for the Department of Homeland Security, Customs and Border Protection (CBP).

=== GPO publications ===
External videos
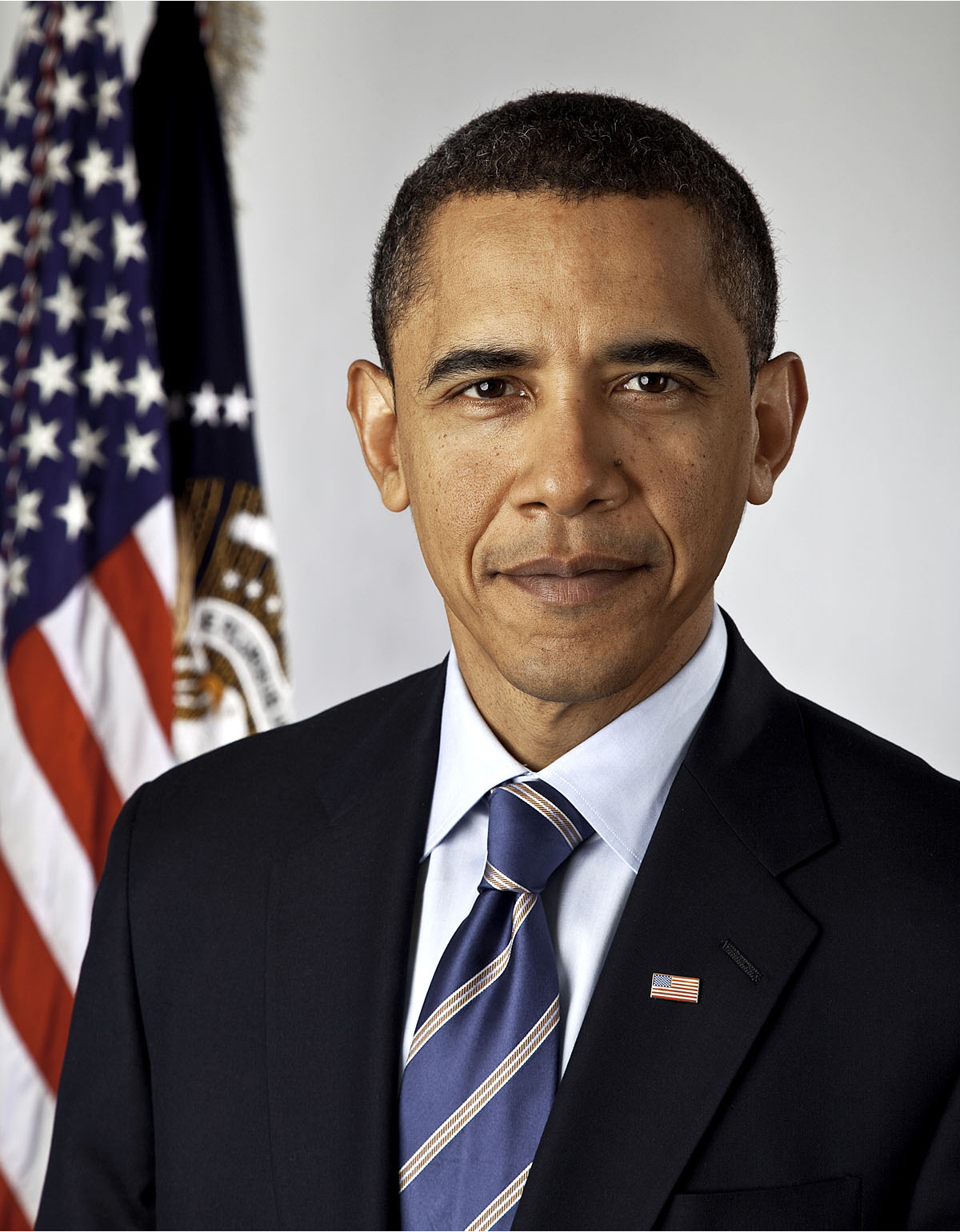
- Official Presidential Photograph printed by GPO
- American Artifacts: Government Printing Office (29:47), C-SPAN

- Cumulative Copyright Catalogs
- Medical and Surgical History of the War of the Rebellion (1870–88)
- Official Records of the American Civil War
- U.S. Congressional Serial Set

GPO publishes the U.S. Government Publishing Office Style Manual. Among the venerable series are Foreign Relations of the United States for the Department of State (since 1861), and Public Papers of the Presidents, covering the administrations of Presidents Herbert Hoover onward (except Franklin D. Roosevelt, whose papers were privately printed). GPO published the Statistical Abstract of the United States for the Census Bureau from 1878 to 2012.

== Internet access to GPO publications ==
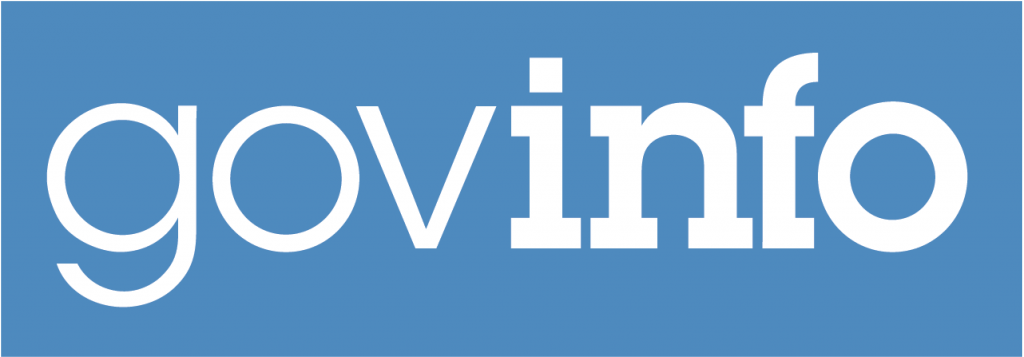
Govinfo logo, 2016

In 1993, President Bill Clinton signed the GPO Electronic Information Access Enhancement Act, which enabled GPO to put Government information online for the first time. One year later, GPO began putting Government information online for the public to access. In 2009, GPO replaced its GPO Access website with the Federal Digital System, or FDsys. In 2016, GPO launched GovInfo, a mobile-friendly website for the public to access Government information. GovInfo makes available at no charge the Congressional Record, the Federal Register, Public Papers of the Presidents, the U.S. Code, and other materials.

== GPO Police ==
Security and law enforcement for GPO facilities is provided by the Government Publishing Office Police. The force is part of the GPO's Security Services Division, and in 2003 it had 53 officers. Officers are appointed under Title 44 USC § 317 by the Public Printer (or their delegate). Its mission is to "protect persons and property in premises and adjacent areas occupied by or under the control of the Government Printing Office".

Officers have concurrent jurisdiction with the law enforcement agencies where the premises are located. GPO Police Officers are required to maintain active certification with the Washington D.C. Metropolitan Police Department as their agency holds a cooperative agreement with the city, granting GPO Police authority to enforce city laws and regulations to include Traffic Code. Officers are authorized to bear and use arms in the performance of their duties, make arrests for violations of federal and state law (and that of Washington, D.C.), and enforce the regulations of the Public Printer, including requiring the removal from GPO premises of individuals who violate such regulations.

== See also ==
- Bureau of Engraving and Printing, responsible for the printing of United States currency
- His Majesty's Stationery Office
- King's Printer
- National Technical Information Service
- United States Congressional Joint Committee on Printing
