= Office of the Federal Register =

United States government agency that publishes various legal documents

The Office of the Federal Register (OFR) is an office of the United States government within the National Archives and Records Administration.

The Office publishes the Federal Register, Code of Federal Regulations, Public Papers of the Presidents, and United States Statutes at Large, among others. It also examines Constitutional amendment ratification documents, and Electoral College documents from the U.S. states for facial legal sufficiency and an authenticating signature.

In May 2014, the Office held an "editathon" which focused on improving Wikipedia entries related to government entities.

== See also ==
- Title 1 of the Code of Federal Regulations
