= Battle of Vernon =

Battle of the American Civil War

Coordinates: 30.6812°N 85.6356°W

Battle of Vernon, Florida
- Part of American Civil War
Date	September 28, 1864
Location	Washington County, near Vernon, Florida
Result	Union victory

Belligerents
United States (Union)	(Confederate States of America) CSA (Confederacy)

Commanders and leaders
Alexander Asboth	W.B. Jones

Strength
700	~50

Casualties and losses
No casualties	1 killed, 1 wounded, most survivors taken prisoner

The Battle of Vernon, Florida was a minor skirmish of the American Civil War that took place on September 28, 1864, near the town of Vernon, Florida. Coming a day after the larger Battle of Marianna, this conflict involved a company of Home Guard troops from Vernon who were going to the aid of their Confederate compatriots in that city. Unbeknownst to the Southerners, their route had taken them straight toward the withdrawing Federal column under Brigadier General Alexander Asboth, which was returning to their main base at Pensacola after their victory at Marianna. The two forces met on a wooden bridge across Hard Labor Creek in Washington County; refusing to heed Union demands to disperse, the badly-outnumbered Floridians chose to resist and were quickly defeated, with most of them being taken prisoner.

== Prelude ==
In the summer of 1864, Florida Governor John Milton ordered the creation of Home Guard units in the state's counties. Located in the Florida Panhandle, Washington County had few men of military age who were not already in Confederate service, invalids or too old or young to fight. Additionally, some country residents had already defected to the Federals, including the county Sheriff With barely thirty available men, the local Home Guard company chose Second Lieutenant W.B. Jones, a veteran of the 6th Florida Infantry who had been discharged for wounds received in Tennessee, to lead them. Upon learning of the approach of Federal forces, Confederate commanders in Mariana had sent out messengers to nearby towns and villages, asking them to come to their aid with all possible speed.

Though the message sent to Jones did not arrive until after the Battle of Marianna had concluded, Jones was still determined to do what he could to help his brothers in arms. Assembling his company, he went through Vernon and forced every man there to join him, regardless of age—men "considerably older than sixty" were forced to shoulder their rifles and accompany his column. By the time he set out on the morning of the 28th, Jones had managed to assemble about fifty mounted men.

Meanwhile, the Federal column—over 700 strong— had left Marianna to return to Pensacola in the early morning hours of April 28, driving a large herd of confiscated cattle, horses and mules, and accompanied by over 600 liberated slaves. By noon, they had reached Orange Hill in Washington County, where they burned the barns and outbuildings of the Everett Plantation, then stopped for lunch. Resuming their march shortly thereafter, they reached a wooden bridge spanning Hard Labor Creek, about five miles northeast of Vernon.

== The battle ==
The Confederate and Federal columns met unexpectedly as they each approached the bridge from opposite sides of the creek. Uncertain of what to do, each side waited for the other to start something. After a few minutes Federals of the lead element, from the 1st Florida Cavalry (US), demanded that Captain Jones and his men surrender. According to local legend, a Confederate named Stephen Pierce (a veteran of the 4th Florida Infantry, invalided home from Tennessee) cursed and taunted the Union soldiers, who responded by firing a volley into the Southerners and then charging across the bridge. Legend says Pierce was dragged behind a gallberry bush by enraged Federal soldiers and murdered, but recent research suggests he was killed during the initial exchange of fire, instead.

Outnumbered more than ten to one, the Southerners scattered and rushed pell-mell back toward Vernon, with many being taken prisoner by pursuing Federals. A few managed to escape, reporting that the Union troopers chased them all the way back to Vernon, shooting at them the whole time. Amazingly, only one man had been killed and one wounded—both from Jones' Home Guard unit.

== Aftermath ==
The captured prisoners were sent first to Ship Island, Mississippi, then on to the Federal prison camp at Elmira, New York where five of them died. Captain Jones survived his imprisonment, but came home "badly enfeebled" while managing to survive another thirty years.

The Federals stopped briefly in Vernon to rest after the brief engagement, then resumed their march toward Pensacola later in the day. Although Confederate troops from Florida and nearby Georgia pursued Asboth's retiring column, they were unable to catch it before they reached the Union lines.

Today, the Battle of Vernon—like many similar skirmishes throughout the nation during the Civil War—has largely been forgotten, save by local residents.
