= Embassy of the United States, Buenos Aires =

Diplomatic mission in Argentina

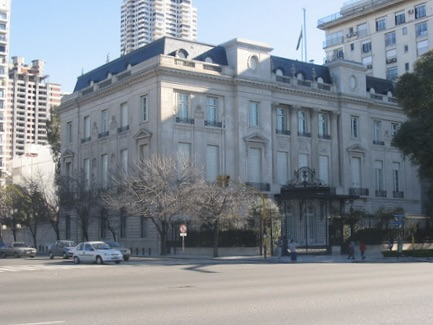
- The Bosch Palace
- Location: Buenos Aires, Argentina
- Address: Av. Colombia 4300, C1425GMN CABA, Argentina
- Coordinates: 34°34′37″S 58°25′5″W
- Website: https://ar.usembassy.gov

The Embassy of the United States in Buenos Aires is the diplomatic mission of the United States in Argentina. It is within walking distance of Bosch Palace, which is the residence of the United States Ambassador to Argentina.

== History ==
The United States recognized the Government of United Provinces of the Río de la Plata (the predecessor of Argentina) on January 27, 1823. The first appointed American diplomat presented his credentials on December 27 of the same year.

The U.S. established formal diplomatic relations with the Argentine Republic following the collapse of the Argentine Confederation in 1861. The U.S. Legation was elevated to an Embassy status on October 1, 1914, with Frederic Jessup Stimson appointed as the first U.S. Ambassador Extraordinary and Plenipotentiary to Argentina, presenting his credentials in early 1915.

The U.S. briefly suspended diplomatic relations in 1944 during World War II due to the Argentine Government's delayed entry into the war on the side of the Allies. Normal relations resumed on April 19, 1945, after the Inter-American Conference in Mexico City.

Declassified U.S. documents revealed that the State Department, under Secretary of State Henry Kissinger, supported the military regime following the 1976 Argentine coup d'état. Kissinger's administration prioritized regional stability by the junta over human rights concerns. The U.S. Embassy, aware of coup plotting, observed the political chaos and violence that escalated in Argentina, leading to the disappearance and death of thousands. Ambassador Robert C. Hill indicated foreknowledge of the coup. The embassy's involvement during this period was part of a campaign called Operation Condor, where Southern Cone intelligence agencies collaborated in repressing dissent.

Meghan Markle worked at the embassy in the latter half of 2001, at the height of the 1998–2002 Argentine great depression, as an intern during her junior year of college.

== See also ==
- Argentina–United States relations
- Embassy of Argentina, Washington, D.C.
- List of ambassadors of the United States to Argentina
