= Argentina–United States relations =

- United States: Argentina

Diplomatic mission
- Embassy of the United States, Buenos Aires: Embassy of Argentina, Washington, D.C.

Envoy
- U.S. Ambassador to Argentina Peter Lamelas: Argentine Ambassador to the United States Alec Oxenford

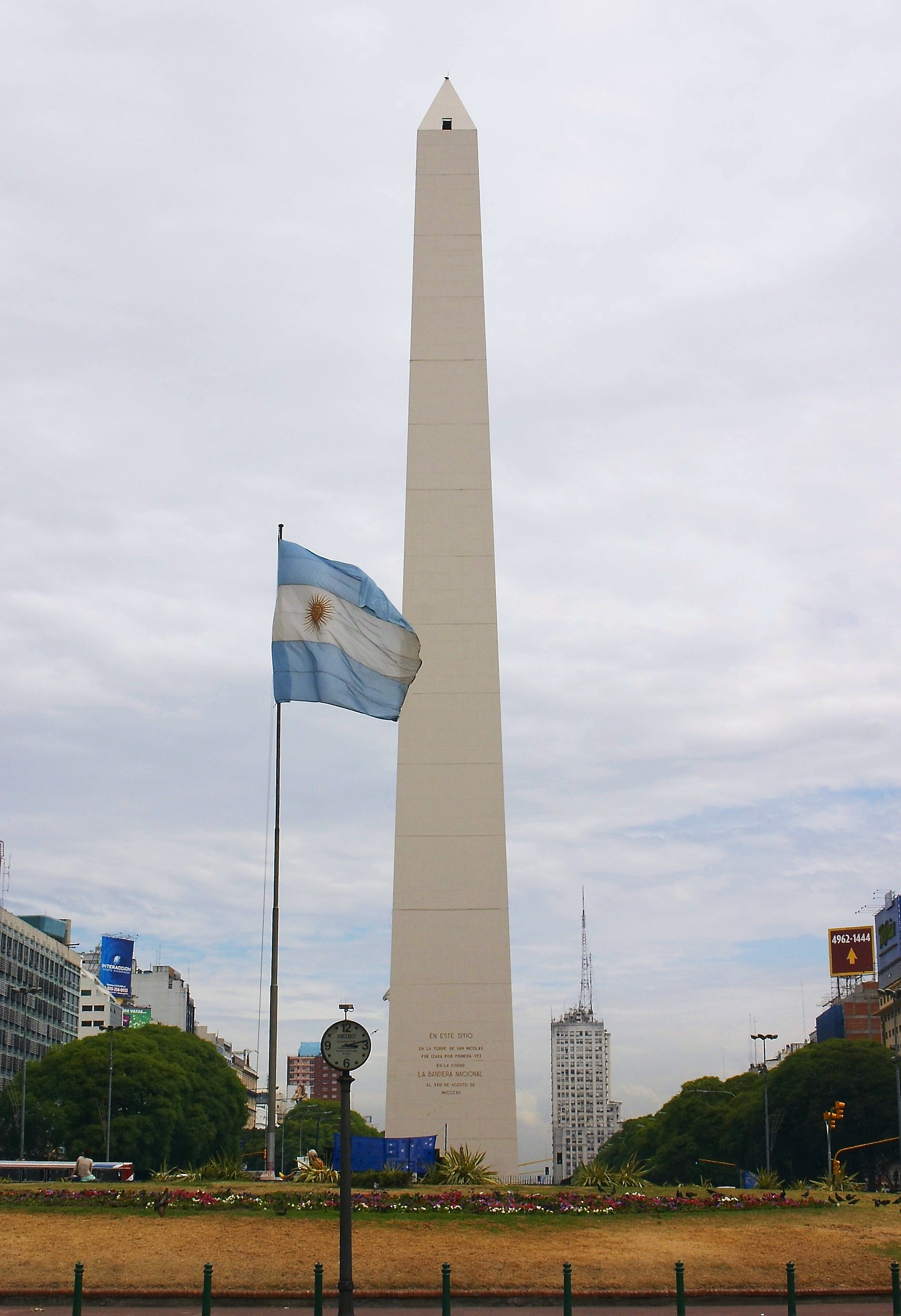
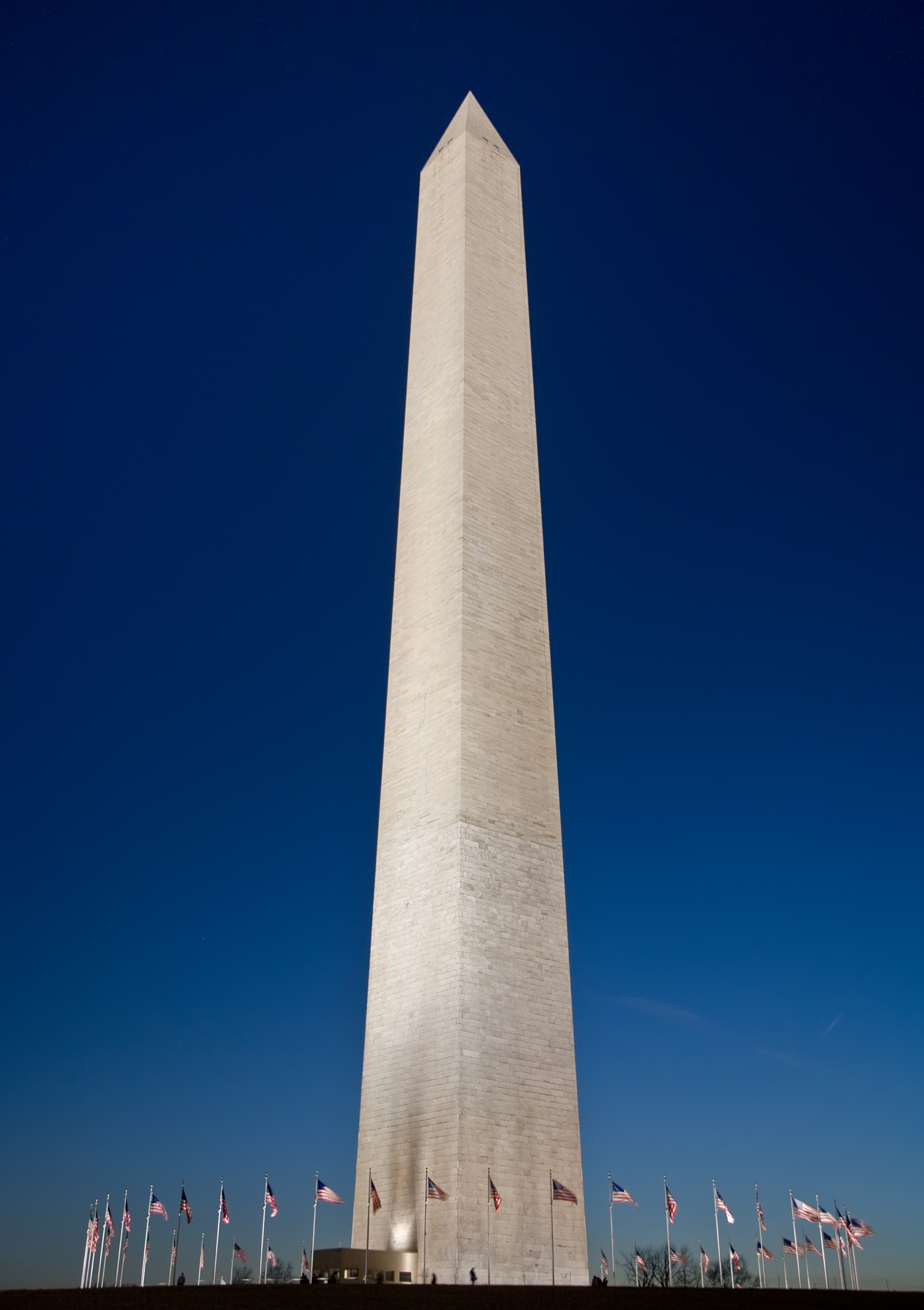
The Obelisco (left) and the Washington Monument (right), iconic symbols of both Buenos Aires and Washington.

Argentina and the United States have maintained bilateral relations since the United States formally recognized the United Provinces of the Río de la Plata, the predecessor to Argentina, on January 27, 1823.

Relations were severely strained in the era of World War II, when Argentina refused to declare war on Nazi Germany, and became the only Latin American nation not to receive American aid. Relations continued to be difficult when the Perons were in power. Relations were strained in 1982 after the US supported the United Kingdom against Argentina. Since 1998, Argentina has been a major non-NATO ally, partly owing to Argentina's assistance to the United States in the Gulf War (known as Operativo Alfil). Relations have been strained at times over the past few years, especially during the Cristina Fernández de Kirchner administration, but they improved during the presidency of Mauricio Macri (2015–2019) and dramatically improved during the presidency of Javier Milei (2023–present).

== History ==
After Argentina became independent from Spanish rule, the United States formally recognized the United Provinces of the Río de la Plata, the legal predecessor to Argentina, on January 27, 1823. The bilateral relations have seesawed over the last century and a half between periods of greater cooperation and periods of tension over ideology and finance. There has never been a threat of war.

Argentine leaders were disappointed when the American government refused to invoke the Monroe Doctrine during instances such as the British establishment of a colony on the Falkland Islands, or during the Anglo-French blockade of the Río de la Plata.

In 1833, the US Navy shelled the Falkland Islands, at the time under Argentine control, in retaliation for the seizing of American ships fishing in Argentine waters. The new constitution of 1853 was based in part on the American Constitution. In 1853, a commercial treaty was concluded between the two nations.

=== 1870–1930 ===
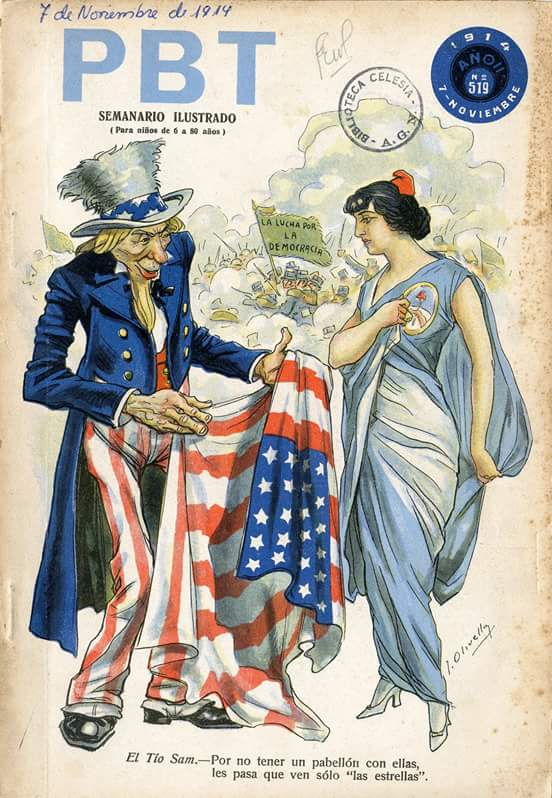
Cover of Argentine magazine PBT n° 519 about relations between the USA and Argentina in 1914, featuring the Uncle Sam and the Liberty of Oudiné.

Argentina was closely linked to the British economy in the late 19th century; and as such there was minimal contact with the United States. When the United States began promoting the Pan American Union, some Argentines were suspicious that it was indeed a device to lure the country into the US economic orbit, but most businessmen responded favorably and bilateral trade grew briskly after the United States and did care of duties on Argentine wool in 1893.

Relations soured when Argentina refused to join the Allies in the First World War. Argentina had large British and German populations and both countries had made large-scale investments in Argentina. However, as a prosperous neutral it greatly expanded trade with the United States during the war and exported meat, grain and wool to the Allies particularly to Britain, providing generous loans and becoming a net creditor to the Allied side, a policy known as "benevolent neutrality".

=== 1940s ===
Argentina's policy during the Second World War was marked by two distinct phases. During the early years of the war, Argentine President Roberto M. Ortiz sought to sell food and wool to Britain. He even proposed to US President Franklin Roosevelt for both countries to join the Allies together as non-belligerents in 1940. However his proposal was snubbed at the time, as Roosevelt was trying to get re-elected.

After the Japanese attack on Pearl Harbor, US foreign policy worked to unite all of Latin America in a coalition against Germany, but Argentina's neutralist stance had hardened since the resignation of Ortiz who resigned because of poor health. The United States worked to pressure Argentina into the war against the wishes of Britain, which supported Argentine neutrality in an effort to maintain vital provisions of beef and wheat to the Allies that were safe from German U-boat attacks. Most of the beef and the wheat consumed in Britain came from Argentina.

US policy backfired after the military seized power in a coup in 1943. Relations grew worse, prompting the powerful US farm lobby to promote the economic and diplomatic isolation of Argentina and attempt to keep it out of the United Nations. The policy was reversed when Argentina became the last Latin American nation to declare war on Germany in March 1945. Argentina had hosted a fairly-organized pro-German element before the war that had been controlled by German ambassadors. It operated openly, unlike in Brazil, Chile, and Mexico. Historians agree that the affinity between Argentina and Germany was greatly exaggerated.

The Argentine government remained neutral until the closing weeks of the war and after the war quietly tolerated and in some cases aided the entry of German scientists and some notable war criminals including Josef Mengele, Adolf Eichmann, Erich Priebke, Josef Schwammberger, and Gerhard Bohne who were fleeing Europe through ratlines. The voyages of German submarines U-530 and U-977 to Argentina at the end of the war led to legends, apocryphal stories, and conspiracy theories that they had transported escaping Nazi leaders (such as Adolf Hitler) and/or Nazi gold to South America. Historians have shown there was little gold and probably only a few Nazis, but the myths lived on and helped to sour relations with the United States. When Juan Perón ran for president in 1945 and 1946, US Ambassador Spruille Braden attacked him with a "Blue Book on Argentina," but public opinion rallied behind Perón. Relations remained tense throughout the Perón years, as he held fascist sympathies, tried to remain neutral in the Cold War and continued to harbor Nazi war criminals. Washington blocked funds from international agencies and restricted trade and investment opportunities. Meanwhile Peron championed Anti-Americanism across Latin America, and financed radical elements in other countries. He did not, however, support the USSR in the Cold War.

=== 1955-1990s ===
After Perón was ousted in 1955, relations improved dramatically. President Arturo Frondizi became the first Argentine president to visit the United States in 1959. Argentina provided support for the American Alliance for Progress, the American invasion of the Dominican Republic in 1965, and the isolation of Cuba after 1960.

By 1976, US human rights groups were denouncing the "Dirty War" waged against leftist dissidents by the repressive military regime in Argentina. They demanded congressional control over foreign aid funding to regimes violating human rights. The US State Department saw Argentina as a bulwark of anticommunism in South America, and in early April 1976, the US Congress approved a request by the Ford administration, written and supported by Henry Kissinger, to grant $50,000,000 in security assistance to the junta.

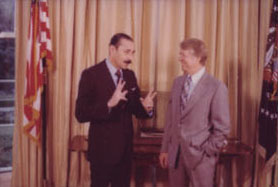
Argentine junta leader Jorge Rafael Videla meeting U.S. President Jimmy Carter in September 1977

In 1977 and 1978, the United States sold more than $120,000,000 in spare military parts to Argentina, and in 1977, the Department of Defense granted $700,000 to train 217 Argentine military officers. By the mid-1970s, when détente with the Soviets softened anti-communism and President Jimmy Carter highlighted issues of human rights, US activists escalated their attacks and in 1978 secured a congressional cutoff of all US arms transfers to Argentina. Argentina then turned largely to Israel for weapons sales.

American-Argentine relations improved dramatically under the Reagan administration, which asserted that the Carter administration had weakened US diplomatic relationships with Cold War allies in Argentina, and it reversed the previous administration's official condemnation of the junta's human rights practices. The re-establishment of diplomatic ties allowed for the CIA collaboration with the Argentine intelligence service in arming and training the Nicaraguan Contras against the Sandinista government. The 601 Intelligence Battalion, for example, trained Contras at Lepaterique base, in Honduras. Argentina also provided security advisors, intelligence training and some material support to forces in Guatemala, El Salvador and Honduras to suppress local rebel groups as part of a US-sponsored program, Operation Charly.

Argentine military and intelligence co-operation with the Reagan administration ended in 1982, when Argentina seized the British territory of the Falkland Islands in an attempt to quell domestic and economic unrest. The move was condemned by the US, which provided intelligence to the British government in its successful effort to regain control over the islands.

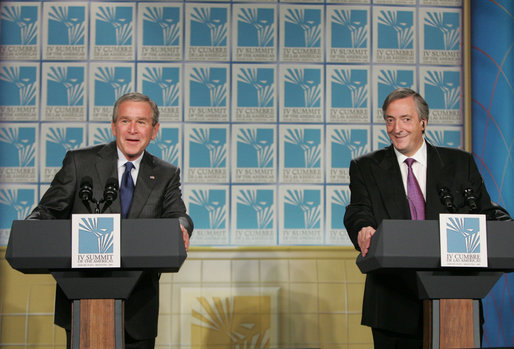
US President George W. Bush and Argentine President Nestor Kirchner during the 2005 Summit of the Americas, in Mar del Plata, Argentina

The US has a positive bilateral relationship with Argentina based on many common strategic interests, including non-proliferation, counternarcotics, counterterrorism, the fight against human trafficking, and issues of regional stability, as well as the strength of commercial ties. Argentina signed a Letter of Agreement with the US Department of State in 2004, opening the way for enhanced cooperation with the US on counternarcotics issues and enabling the US to begin providing financial assistance to the Argentine government for its counternarcotics efforts. In recognition of its contributions to international security and peacekeeping, the US government designated Argentina as a major non-NATO ally in January 1998.

=== 21st century ===
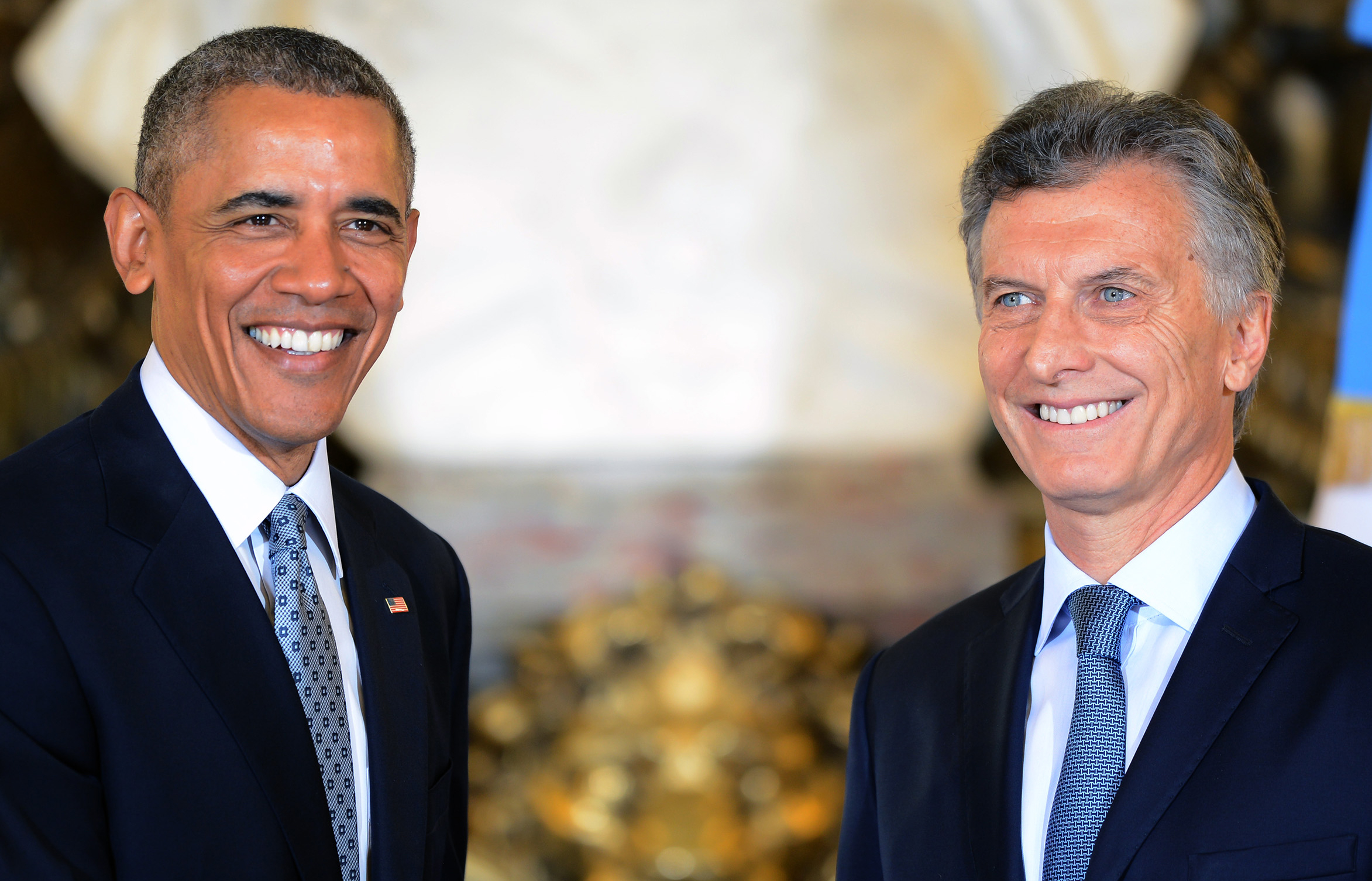
US President Barack Obama and Argentine President Mauricio Macri in March 2016.

The Office of the Secretary of Defense and the Argentine Ministry of Defense hold an annual Bilateral Working Group Meeting, alternating between Argentina and Washington, DC. Also, both nations exchange information through alternating annual joint staff talks, military educational exchanges, and operational officer exchange billets. Argentina is a participant in the Three-Plus-One regional mechanism (Argentina, Brazil, Paraguay, and the US), which focuses on the co-ordination of counterterrorism policies in the triborder region.

Although bilateral relations were strained after the US supported the UK on the Falklands Wars. Currently, the US holds a position of neutrality on the issue of the ownership of the Falkland Islands. It acknowledges the de facto British control of the Falklands but has no position on the sovereignty claim over the islands.

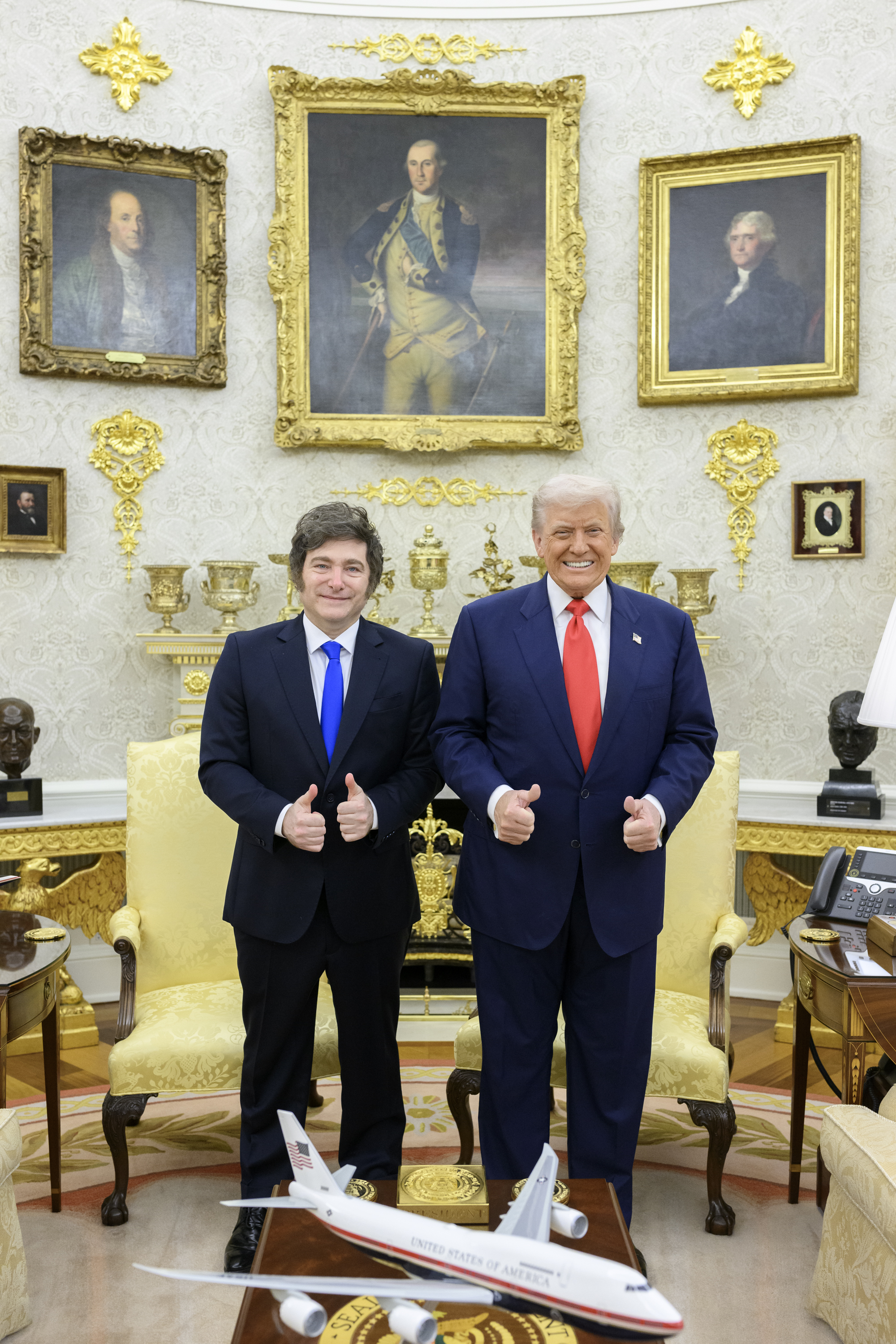
US President Donald Trump and Argentine President Javier Milei in October 2025.

Argentina has endorsed the Proliferation Security Initiative and has implemented the Container Security Initiative and the Trade Transparency Unit, both of which are programs administered by the US Department of Homeland Security and Immigration and Customs Enforcement. The Container Security Initiative provides for the selective scanning of shipping containers to identify weapons of mass destruction components, and the Trade Transparency Unit works jointly with Argentine Customs to identify trade-based money laundering. The Financial Action Task Force on Money Laundering highlighted Argentine legislation passed during 2013 issuing new regulations strengthening suspicious transaction reporting requirements.

Argentina supported the strikes on Iran that killed Supreme Leader Ali Khamenei, unleashing the 2026 Iran war, in which Argentina has maintained continuous support for the United States and Israel.

== Economic relations ==
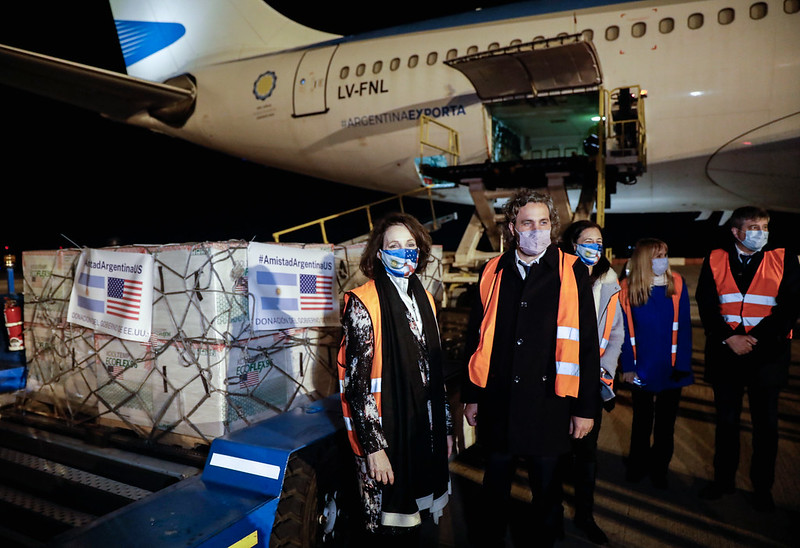
The US delivers COVID vaccines to Argentina through the COVAX program in 2021

U.S.–Argentina cooperation encompasses science and technology, with an emphasis in joint space efforts, peaceful nuclear energy, and environmental initiatives. In July 2023, Argentina formalized its space collaboration with the United States by becoming the 28th signatory of the Artemis Accords, enabling joint participation in civil space missions and reinforcing bilateral space ties. The countries continue to engage in nuclear energy cooperation, reaffirming their commitment to the Non-Proliferation Treaty (NPT) and collaborating through the U.S.–Argentina Joint Standing Committee on Nuclear Energy Cooperation, as described by their October 2024 joint statement. With regard to aviation, in June 2019, the U.S. Department of Transportation and Argentina signed a Protocol of Amendment that updates their aviation agreement, creating open route rights, liberal charter policies, and uncapped flight frequencies— aimed at boosting tourism, and business travel. On the public diplomacy front, the U.S. Embassy in Buenos Aires continues its Public Diplomacy Strategic Programs (PAS) for 2025 and are funding and promoting educational exchanges and cultural engagement across Argentina.

=== Trade ===
The stock of U.S. investment in Argentina reached $14.5 billion in 2023, with more than 330 U.S. companies doing business with the country. In 2024, the US imported US$9.82B in goods from Argentina, and Argentina imported US$16.5B in goods from the US, leaving a US$6.64B trade balance in favor of the US. The United States is Argentina's third-largest export market (mainly energy staples, steel, and wine), and third-largest source of imports (mainly industrial supplies such as chemicals and machinery), accounting for approximately 12.7% of Argentina’s exports—trailing only China (21.5%) and Brazil (19.6%)

Argentina itself is a relatively minor trade partner for the United States, its imports from the U.S. of $9.9 billion making up 0.7% of total U.S. exports and its exports to the U.S. of $4.5 billion only 0.2% of U.S. imports; Argentina however is among the few nations with which the United States routinely maintains significant merchandise trade surpluses, and the $5.4 billion surplus with Argentina in 2011 was the tenth-largest for the U.S. in the world.

U.S. investment in Argentina is concentrated in the energy, manufacturing, information technology, and financial sectors. US-based firms comprised nearly 1/3 of the 100 most respected companies in Argentina published annually by Argentina's largest newspaper, Clarín.

=== Travel and tourism ===
Available data from the International Trade Administration:

Argentine visitors to the United States
Year	Number of visitors	Expenditures	Notes
2017	1,000,000+	US$4.8 billion	N/A
2019	854,442	N/A	GOA imposed a 35% tax on purchases made abroad with credit and debit cards
2020	197,748	N/A	Borders closed for seven months during the pandemic
2021	301,794	US$1.37 billion	N/A
2022	524,841	US$2.36 billion	N/A
2023	596,000	US$2.81 billion	N/A

According to the Buenos Aires Times, over 413,000 Argentines visited the U.S in the first half of 2025.

In 2012, Argentina requested the assistance of the World Trade Organization in hosting consultations to discuss the United States ban on Argentine lemons.

=== Energy ===
In September 2026, the U.S. Export-Import Bank offered $7 billion in funding to support Argentina's development of its energy and mineral extraction industries.

== Public opinion ==
In 2005, Argentina was labelled as "the most anti-American country in the entire Western Hemisphere." Global opinion polls taken in 2006, 2007 and 2012 show that Argentine public opinion had become skeptical of U.S. foreign policy at the time. According to the U.S. Global Leadership Report, only 19% of Argentines approved of U.S. foreign policy, the lowest rating for any surveyed country in the Americas.

Argentine public opinion of the U.S. and its policies improved during the Obama administration, in 2010 was divided about evenly (42% to 41%) between those who approve or disapprove. As of 2015, Argentine views of the United States' policies are evenly divided with 43% of Argentines having a favorable view and 43% having an unfavorable view.

As Donald Trump rattles the global economy with punitive tariffs, a majority in Argentina support doing more trade with Beijing than with the United States, according to the monthly LatAm Pulse survey conducted by AtlasIntel for Bloomberg News in May 2025. In October 2025, Donald Trump announced that he might cut off financial aid to Argentina if Javier Milei lost a crucial legislative election later this month. Before Milei came to power, Argentina was deepening ties with China. According to a 2026 Pew Research Center survey, 44% of Argentinians had a favorable view of the United States, while 44% had a negative view.

== Diplomatic exchanges ==
=== U.S. Embassy functions ===
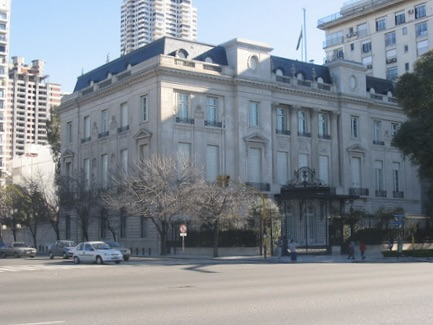
US Ambassador Residence in Buenos Aires

The U.S. Mission in Buenos Aires carries out the traditional diplomatic function of representing the U.S. Government and people in discussions with the Argentine Government, and more generally, in relations with the people of Argentina. The embassy is focused on increasing people-to-people contacts, and promoting outreach and exchanges on a wide range of issues.

Political, economic, and science officers deal directly with the Argentine Government in advancing U.S. interests but are also available to brief U.S. citizens on general conditions in the country. Officers from the U.S. Foreign Service, Foreign Commercial Service, and Foreign Agricultural Service work closely with the hundreds of U.S. companies that do business in Argentina, providing information on Argentine trade and industry regulations and assisting U.S. companies starting or maintaining business ventures in Argentina.

==== Consular section ====
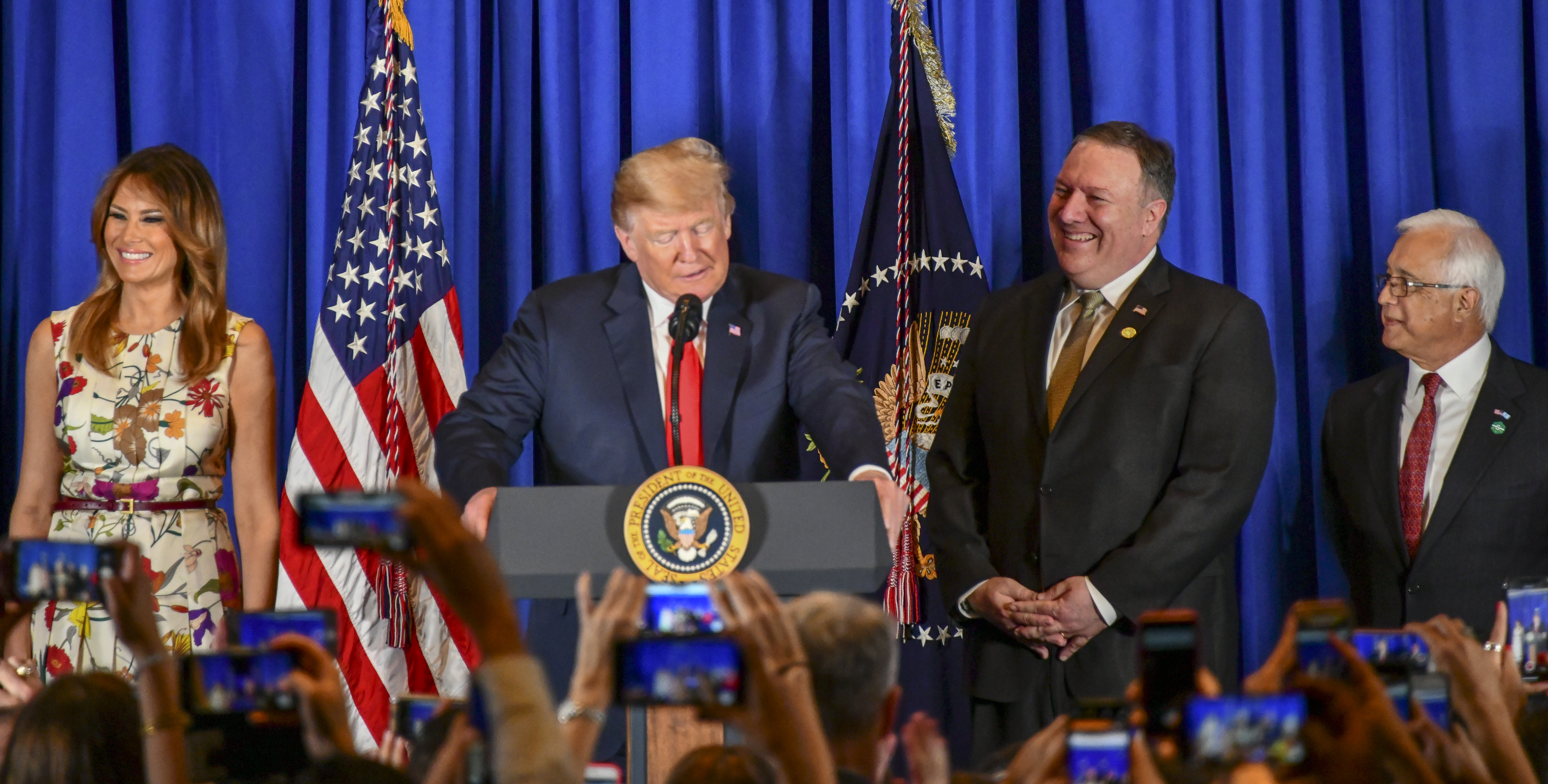
President Trump, Secretary of State Mike Pompeo, First Lady Melania Trump and US Ambassador to Argentina Edward Prado in the US Embassy in Buenos Aires.

The embassy's Consular Section monitors the welfare and whereabouts of more than 20,000 U.S. citizen residents of Argentina and more than 250,000 U.S. tourists each year.

Consular personnel also provide US citizens help regarding passports, voting, Social Security, and other services. With the end of Argentine participation in the Visa Waiver Program in February 2002, Argentine tourists, students, and those who seek to work in the United States must have nonimmigrant visas. The Consular Section processes non-immigrant visa applications for persons who wish to visit the United States for tourism, studies, temporary work, or other purposes, and immigrant visas for persons who qualify to make the United States a permanent home.

==== Attachés ====
Attaches accredited to Argentina from the U.S. Department of Justice (including the Drug Enforcement Administration and the Federal Bureau of Investigation), the Department of Homeland Security (including Immigration and Customs Enforcement, and Customs and Border Protection), the Federal Aviation Administration, and other federal agencies work closely with Argentine counterparts on international law enforcement cooperation, aviation security, and other issues of concern. The U.S. Department of Defense is represented by the U.S. Military Group and the Defense Attache Office. These organizations ensure close military-to-military contacts, and defense and security cooperation with the armed forces of Argentina.

=== U.S. diplomat in Argentina ===
Edward C. Prado was nominated to the post of Ambassador to Argentina by President Donald Trump on January 17, 2018. The post had been vacant since the resignation of Noah Mamet a year earlier, during which time Chargé d'Affaires Tom Cooney served as acting ambassador.

Prado later served as ambassador until 2021, when he was succeeded by Marc R. Stanley, a Texas trial lawyer and Democratic activist appointed by President Joe Biden. Stanley presented his credentials in early 2022 and served as U.S. ambassador in Buenos Aires until 2025.

In October 2025, health-care executive Peter Lamelas arrived in Buenos Aires as the new U.S. ambassador to Argentina, succeeding Stanley.

=== Argentinian diplomat in the United States ===
Fernando Oris de Roa, an executive with extensive experience in Argentine agriculture, was appointed Ambassador to the United States by President Mauricio Macri on January 11, 2018.

The post had been vacant since the April 3, 2017, resignation of Martín Lousteau over an arms procurement scandal involving a $2 billion request disclosed by the office of Congressman Pete Visclosky but not authorized by the Argentine Congress. Chargé d'Affaires Sergio Pérez Gunella had served as acting ambassador in the interim.

After Alberto Fernández took office in December 2019, he designated Jorge Argüello as ambassador to the United States. Argüello's credentials were accepted in Washington, where President Donald Trump asked Argüello to tell president Fernández that "[he] can count with this President" regarding the Argentine debt with the International Monetary Fund.

On February 22, 2020, Argüello said that he was working to pave the way for a meeting between the two presidents.

Businessman Gerardo Werthein, who later became foreign minister in Javier Milei's government, also served as Argentina's ambassador to the United States. In November 2024, President Javier Milei selected technology entrepreneur Alec Oxenford as Argentina's next ambassador to Washington.

== Diplomatic missions ==
Of Argentina

- Washington, D.C. (Embassy)
- Atlanta (Consulate-General)
- Chicago (Consulate-General)
- Houston (Consulate-General)
- Los Angeles (Consulate-General)
- Miami (Consulate-General)
- New York City (Consulate-General)

Of the United States

- Buenos Aires (Embassy)

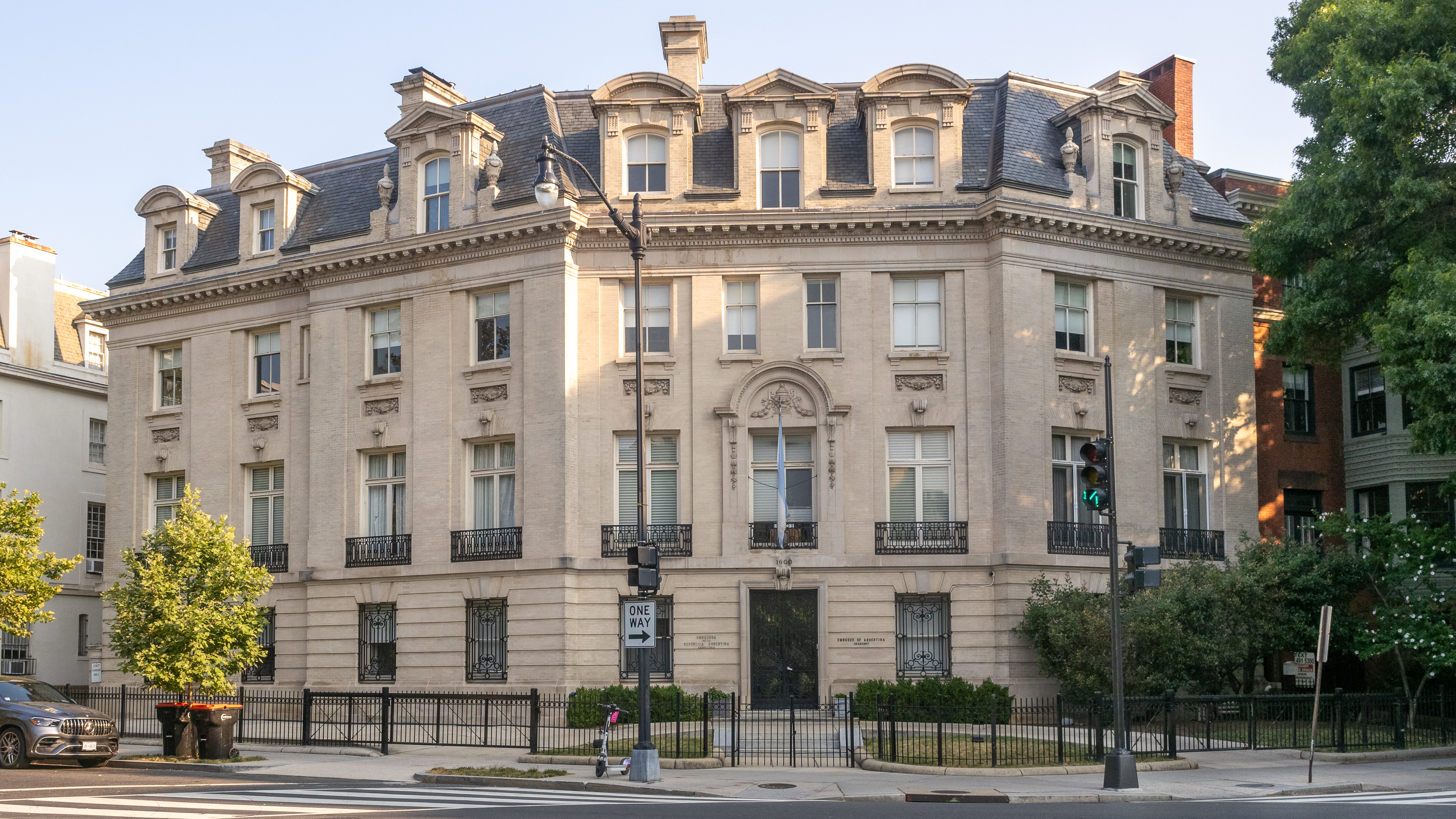
Embassy of Argentina in Washington, D.C.

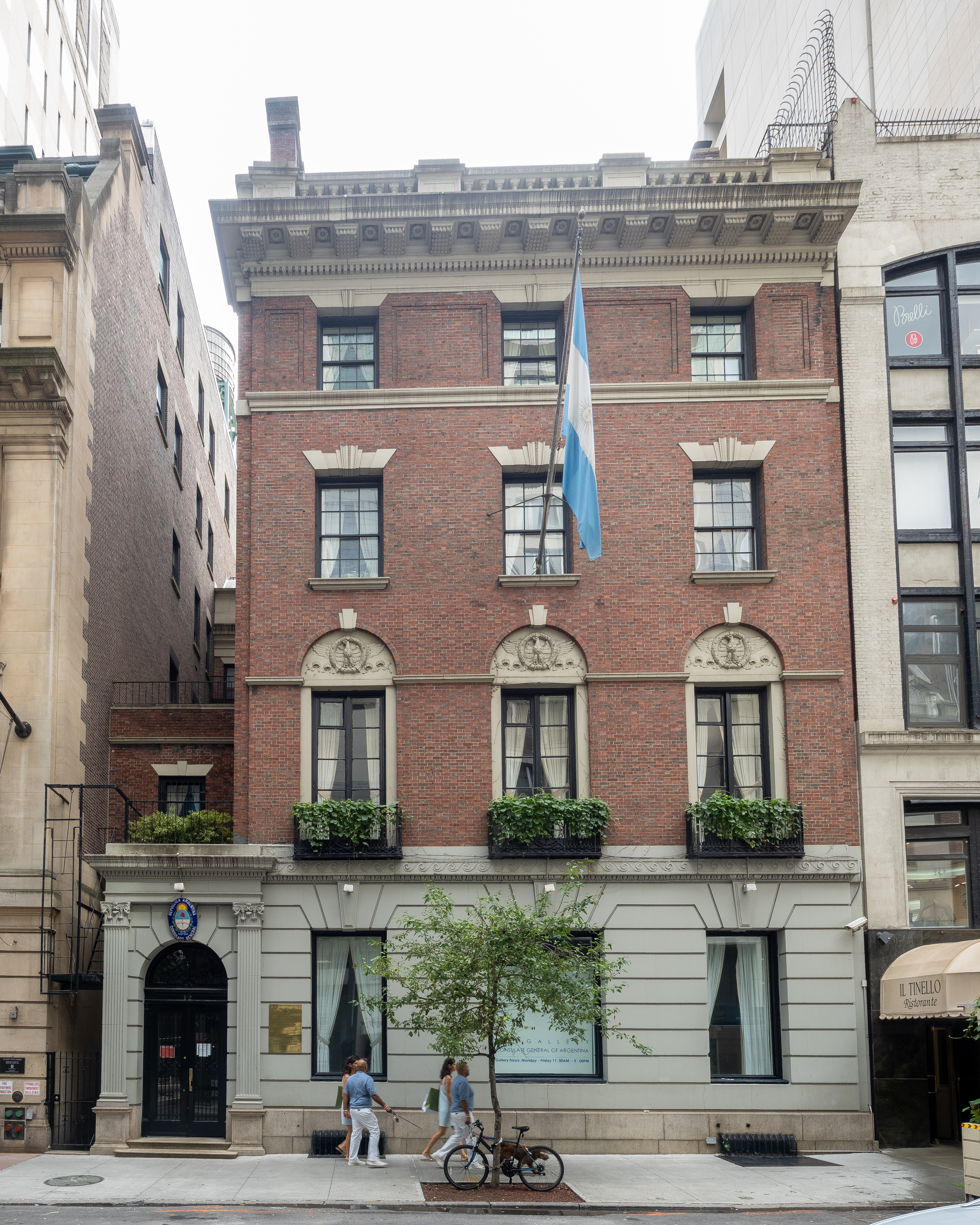
Consulate-General of Argentina in New York City

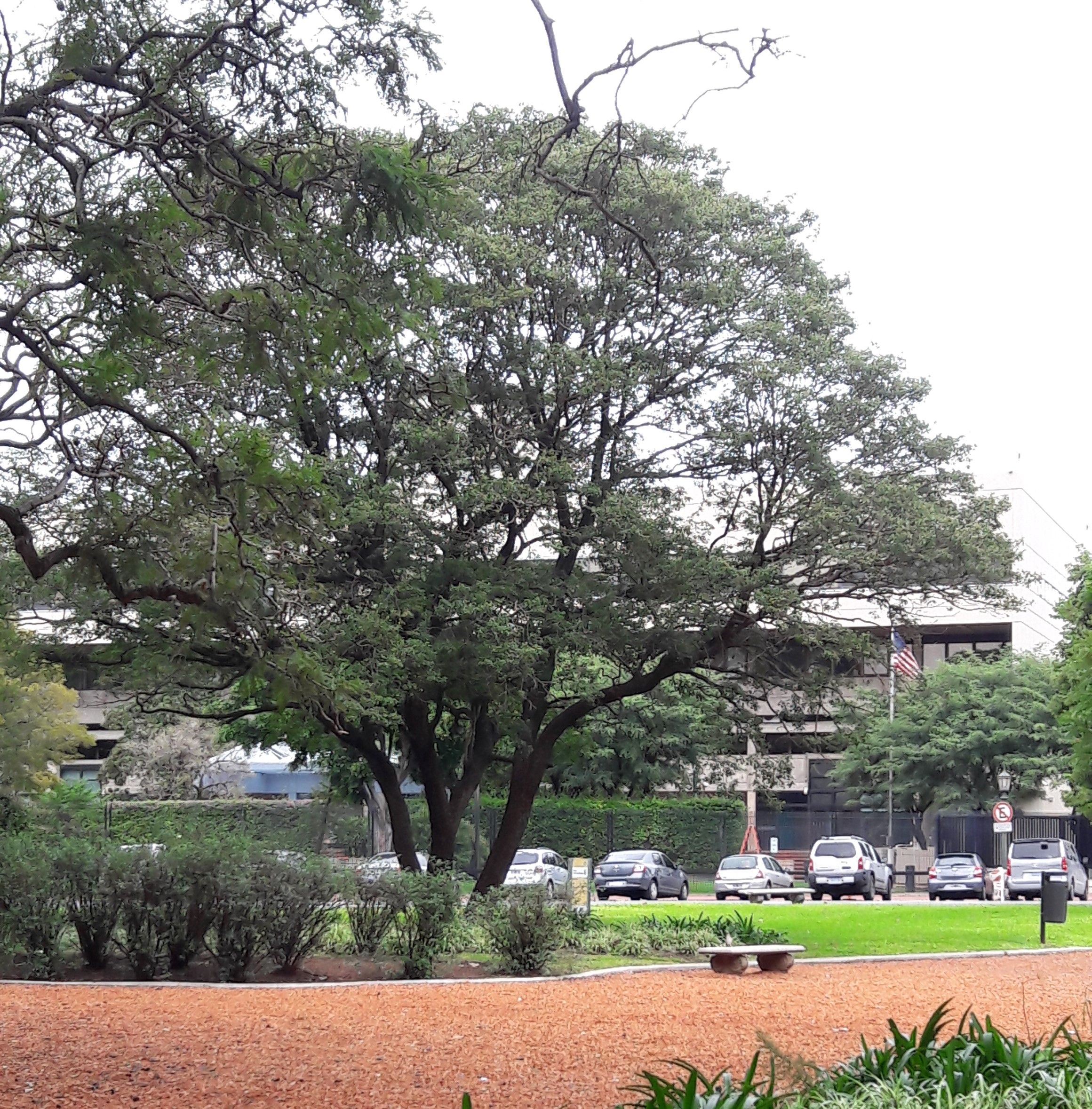
Embassy of the United States in Buenos Aires

== See also ==
- Foreign relations of Argentina
- Foreign relations of the United States
- United States Ambassador to Argentina
- Argentina–United States lemon dispute
- Argentine Americans
- Americans in Argentina
