= Chicana Rights Project =

Feminist organization created in 1974

The Chicana Rights Project (CRP) was a feminist organization created in 1974 to address the legal rights of poor Mexican-American women. The organization was guided by the Mexican American Legal Defense and Educational Fund (MALDEF) and created by Vilma Martinez. The project was headquartered in San Francisco and San Antonio.

== About ==
The project was founded by Vilma Martinez, president of MALDEF and the first woman in the United States to lead a significant civil rights organization. Funding for the organization was provided by the Ford Foundation, and was separate from funds for MALDEF. The foundation wanted to fund projects with organizations they already supported. For the first year, the foundation offered CRP $25,000. Every year afterward, the CRP had to justify itself to the Ford Foundation in order to receive funding for the next year.

CRP started its first litigation in 1975, focusing on employment, health care and prison reform. The organization won unemployment benefits for Head Start workers in Texas. It also won complaints against military bases and other organizations for discrimination in hiring and promoting Chicanas. For example, the CRP won a complaint against San Antonio's Comprehensive Employment Training Act in which they addressed issues regarding sexual discrimination in their hiring process. The CRP also won cases against doctors who were forcing Spanish-speaking women to consent to sterilization, often asking them while they were giving birth, or just before a Cesarean operation. In California, these patients were pressured with threats of exposure to immigration authorities for those who were illegal aliens and threats of welfare payments being cancelled if they did not sign over their right to sterilization. In another case handled by the CRP, Chicana women were being experimented on in San Antonio by being given placebo birth control pills without their consent or knowledge. The CRP also acted as a watchdog for the Comprehensive Employment and Training Act (CETA). Their first filing against CETA in 1976 caused the number of minorities and women in the program to rise from 20% to 50%.

In 1976, the CRP branched out, filing an amicus brief on behalf of a black woman, Margaret Miller, who was fired for rejecting sexual harassment from her supervisor. CRP also represented Chicano men.

CRP collected data on Chicana employment and educational discrimination. CRP used this data to show that Chicana women were discriminated against in different ways than Chicano men and white women in the United States. This research also revealed how legal rights were gendered and often ignored by the broader Chicano movement.

CRP was also involved in educational outreach to Chicana women. This outreach included a series of pamphlets on topics such as women's health issues, immigrant rights and employment.

== History ==
Martinez immediately began work on the CRP after she became MALDEF president in September 1973. Martinez hired a lawyer and former Congressional secretary, Patricia Vasquez, in June 1974 to run CRP. As the organization grew, the CRP set up a task force, in 1976, which would identify and prioritize legal cases. On the board of the task force were Francisca Flores, Pauline Jacobo, Teresa Aragon de Shepro, Carmen Carrillo, Drucilla Ramey, Elizabeth Waldman and Jean Fairfax.

By the summer of 1978, in order to gain more grassroots support, the CRP began to collaborate with Comisión Femenil, the Chicana Service Action Center (CSAC), Mujeres Unidas and the Mexican American Women's National Association (MANA).

In 1979, Vasquez resigned from CRP, saying she had "mixed feelings" about leaving and was resigning also because of "incompatible differences" between herself and Martinez. Carmen Estrada, who had been working in the CRP San Francisco office, took over Vasquez place as the head of CRP. When Martinez resigned from MALDEF in 1982, the project faltered without her leadership and support. In 1983, there was a lack of funds to continue the project and it ended.

== Notable cases ==
- Lau v. Nichols (1974)
- Regents of the University of California v. Bakke (1978)
- Plyler v. Doe (1982)

== Notable members ==
- Francisca Flores
- Vilma Martinez
- Graciela Olivarez
