= Bosch Palace =

Official residence of the U.S. Ambassador to Argentina

- Palacio Bosch
- Interactive map of the Bosch Palace area

General information
- Architectural style: French Neoclassical
- Location: Palermo, Buenos Aires, Argentina, Avenida del Libertador, Argentina
- Coordinates: 34°34′27″S 58°25′08″W
- Current tenants: United States Ambassador to Argentina
- Completed: 1917
- Client: Elisa and Ernesto Bosch
- Owner: U.S. State Department

Design and construction
- Architect: René Sergent
- Other designers: André Carlhian (interior designer), Achille Duchêne and Charles Thays (landscape designers)

The Bosch Palace is an architecturally significant residence in the Palermo section of Buenos Aires, Argentina.

== Overview ==
The French Neoclassical mansion was commissioned by Elisa and Ernesto Bosch in 1910. Bosch had returned to Argentina following a tenure of six years as Argentine Ambassador to France, and the couple, both born to wealthy landowners, wished to evoke their years in Paris. They commissioned French architect René Sergent to design a mansion in what was then near the northern end of Alvear Avenue, and, following his resignation as Foreign Minister in 1914, he devoted more time to the project with his wife, contracting the Parisian interior designer André Carlhian, and landscape designers Achille Duchêne and Charles Thays.

Completed in 1917, the 3,700 m^{2} (40,000 sq ft) Bosch Palace became of interest to U.S. Ambassador Robert Woods Bliss during a reception there in his honor. History has it that the ambassador offered Bosch to buy the mansion and Bosch, not interested to sell it, gave a ridiculously high price. A few days later, the ambassador returned with a positive answer from his government and Bosch felt obliged to accept. In 1929, the building was sold by the Bosch family to the U.S. State Department for use as the Embassy and residence of the United States Ambassador to Argentina for around US$3 million. The mansion, situated on what today is Avenida del Libertador and overlooking Parque Tres de Febrero, became of sole use as the ambassadorial residence after the 1969 completion of the present U.S. Embassy, an architecturally spare building located within walking distance of the Bosch Palace.
