= Mexican American Legal Defense and Educational Fund =

US non-profit organization

- Type: Non-profit
- Industry: Civil rights
- Founded: August 1, 1968
- Headquarters: Los Angeles, California
- Key people: Henry Solano; (Interim President & General Counsel); Thomas A. Saenz; (President & General Counsel)
- Revenue: 8,797,849 United States dollar (2017)
- Total assets: 25,844,457 United States dollar (2022)
- Number of employees: 50
- Website: maldef.org

The Mexican American Legal Defense and Educational Fund (MALDEF) is a national non-profit civil rights organization formed in 1968 by Jack Greenberg to protect the rights of Latinos in the United States. Founded in San Antonio, Texas, it is currently headquartered in Los Angeles, California and maintains regional offices in Sacramento, San Antonio, Chicago, and Washington, D.C.

== Background ==
MALDEF was founded in San Antonio in 1968 under the direction of Jack Greenberg. With the help of the League of United Latin American Citizens (LULAC) and the NAACP Legal Defense Fund (LDF), MALDEF got a $2.2 million grant from the Ford Foundation. The grant provided scholarships for more Mexican-American lawyers.

In its first three years, MALDEF handled mostly legal-aid cases. Then MALDEF took part in employment discrimination and school funding cases with LDF, including Supreme Court cases through friend-of-the-court briefs. Demetrio Rodriguez et al. v. San Antonio Independent School District was a defeat, with the court ruling against equal financing of education. White, et al. v. Regester, et al. was an important victory. The case created single-member districts for Texas county, city council, and school board districts, ending at-large voting that had weakened minority voting power. In 1989 MALDEF won in Edgewood Independent School District v. State of Texas. The Texas Supreme Court found the state's financing of education unconstitutional and ordered the legislature to change it. This led to the "Robin Hood" funding system, where wealthier school districts had to give to a fund for poorer districts.

== Campaigns ==
MALDEF has set up an education-litigation project, filed on behalf of undocumented parents' children barred from public schools. In Plyler v. Doe, the Supreme Court held these children protected by the equal protection clause of the Fourteenth Amendment.

TMALDEF filed suit for equal opportunity for education in subsequent cases as well. In LULAC et al. v. Richards et al., a 1987 class-action lawsuit charged the State of Texas with discrimination against Mexican Americans in south Texas because of inadequate funding of colleges. In the University of Texas ("UT") system, the UT campus in Austin (historically the campus attended by more children of the state's prestigious and high-earning individuals) received more funding than all other UT campuses combined. The jury did not find the state guilty of discrimination, but did find the legislature failed to establish "first-class" colleges and universities elsewhere in the state. The state legislature then passed the South Texas Initiative to improve UT System schools in Brownsville, Edinburg, San Antonio, and El Paso, and Texas A&M University System branches in Corpus Christi, Laredo, and Kingsville. The Border Region Higher Education Council helped pass the legislation and monitored the program's progress.

In 1974, president of MALDEF, Vilma Martinez, created the Chicana Rights Project (CRP). The project focused on Mexican-American women's unique legal issues. It lasted until 1983 when funding ran out.

MALDEF, along with the ACLU, sued Los Angeles County in 1981, accusing the county of arranging voting districts to frustrate Hispanic political power. Considerable changes in the district lines resulted. To get a fair share of school funding for downtown Los Angeles schools, MALDEF filed a lawsuit in 1992 against the Los Angeles Unified School District.

In GI Forum of Texas v. Perry, MALDEF successfully challenged the Texas redistricting plan before the U.S. Supreme Court. The New York Times described it as "the most important voting rights case of the decade, rejecting the statewide gerrymandering claim brought by...other plaintiffs while accepting the Voting Rights Act challenge in Southwestern Texas, brought by the Mexican American Legal Defense and Educational Fund." The case resulted in new lines drawn for Texas' 23rd Congressional District and a special election (where another MALDEF suit opened the polls early) resulting in the Latino community having the opportunity to elect its candidate of choice to Congress.

In 2010, the fund strongly opposed Arizona SB 1070, the toughest and broadest anti-illegal immigration measure seen in the U.S. in generations. The fund said it might challenge the constitutionality of the law.

On October 27, 2010, MALDEF achieved another victory in Gonzalez v. State of Arizona, striking down an Arizona law that restricted voter registration by requiring proof of American citizenship. MALDEF had challenged the 2004 law, also known as Proposition 200, on grounds that it was unconstitutional and in violation of federal law because it forced voters to meet onerous new identification requirements at the polls and imposed unnecessary paperwork requirements on those seeking to register to vote.

== Staff and headquarters ==
On March 26, 2009, MALDEF's president and general counsel, John Trasviña, was announced as President Obama's nominee to be Assistant Secretary of the Office of Fair Housing and Equal Opportunity in the U.S. Department of Housing and Urban Development. With Trasviña's departure, MALDEF announced Henry Solano, a partner in the law firm Dewey & LeBoeuf and former U.S. Attorney for the District of Colorado, would serve as interim president and general counsel during the search for a permanent replacement; Solano said he was not a candidate for the permanent position. On July 14, 2009, MALDEF announced the selection of Thomas Saenz, chief counsel to Los Angeles Mayor Antonio Villaraigosa, as MALDEF's new president and general counsel.

MALDEF moved into the Banks & Huntley Building in downtown Los Angeles in 1984. In 1991, they agreed to buy the building for $8.5 million ($20.1 million in 2025); they had raised $6.2 million as of 1996.

== See also ==
- Chicana Rights Project
- National Association of Latino Elected and Appointed Officials
- UnidosUS
- American GI Forum
- Southwest Voter Registration Education Project
- League of United Latin American Citizens
- Labor Council for Latin American Advancement
