= Battle of Marianna =

Battle of the American Civil War

Coordinates: 30°46′35″N 85°14′17″W

- Part of American Civil War
Date	September 27, 1864
Location	Marianna, Florida
Result	Union victory

Belligerents
United States of America	Confederate States of America

Commanders and leaders
Brig. Gen. Alexander S. Asboth	Col. Alexander B. Montgomery

Units involved
Subdistrict of West Florida	

Strength
700	300–400

Casualties and losses
8 killed 19 wounded 10 missing or captured	10 killed 16 wounded 41 missing or captured

The Battle of Marianna was a small but significant engagement on September 27, 1864, in the panhandle of Florida during the American Civil War. The Union destruction against Confederates and militia defending the town of Marianna was the culmination of a substantial Federal cavalry raid into northwestern Florida. Ultimately, the Union force withdrew to Fort Barrancas.

== Background ==
Marianna, the home of Florida's ardent secessionist Civil War governor, John Milton, was an important supply depot and recruiting/mustering center for Confederate militia and reserves. By late 1864, it was the largest northwest Florida town besides Tallahassee still in Confederate hands. A July 1864 raid from St. Andrews revealed the region's potential vulnerability to a larger expedition.

On September 18, 1864, a mounted column of 700 Union troops under Brig. Gen. Alexander Asboth set out from Fort Barrancas near the Federal-occupied city of Pensacola and rode eastward on a raid through northwest Florida. The thinly spread local Florida cavalry was unable to provide adequate warning of the size, location, and approach of the raiders. This left regional Confederate commander Col. Alexander B. Montgomery guessing as to the Federal objective and strength, leading to critical delays in calling up reserves and telegraphing for assistance in containing the raiders.

As the raid progressed, the Union cavalry fanned out, destroying or confiscating local foodstuffs and supplies. The Federal troopers captured or scattered a small, mixed company of militia/volunteer Confederate cavalry at Eucheeana on September 23. To disguise his intentions, Asboth had a detachment destroy Douglas' Ferry on the Choctawhatchee River, closing passage along the direct road to Marianna. He then proceeded along an alternate route that would take his expedition northwest of Marianna. On September 26, 1864, his mounted troopers skirmished with Capt. Alexander Godwin's cavalry around Campbellton, less than twenty miles from Marianna. General Asboth rested his weary men in preparation for a fight at Marianna the next day.

Still, Colonel Montgomery delayed coalescing his forces and calling out the Marianna home guard. Campbellton was a crossroads, so the Federals could still move into Georgia or Alabama, into the richest agricultural region in northwest Florida or back southeast toward Marianna. In attempting to picket each potential route of advance with his small force, Montgomery was unable to draw his meager reserves together in strong defense of any of them.

== Opposing forces ==
The troops involved in the battle were:

Confederate:

- Chisolm's Cavalry Company, Alabama Militia
- Company C, 1st Florida Infantry Reserves
- Norwood's Home Guard
- Greenwood Club Cavalry
- Alexander R. Godwin's Cavalry

Union:

- 2nd Maine Cavalry Regiment
  - Two 12-pounder howitzers (non involved)
- 1st Florida Cavalry Regiment
- 82nd U.S. Colored Infantry (Detachment)
- 86th U.S. Colored Infantry (Detachment)

== Battle ==
On the morning of September 27, the Federal riders proceeded toward Marianna. When they passed the Old Fort crossroads, Montgomery finally could be certain of their destination. He called out the homeguard and assembled what reserves were already on hand. Montgomery's cavalry contested the crossing of Hopkins' Branch, 3 miles (4.8 km) from Marianna with the intention of falling back into town via an old bypass (now Kelson Avenue) rather than the main road.

In Marianna, Montgomery deployed the conscripts, militia and homeguard in ambush along the main road (now West Lafayette street). As his skirmishers at Hopkins' Branch withdrew along the bypass, the homeguard waited behind fences and a crude barricade of wagons and carts. St. Luke's Episcopal Church was a few feet away and would play a pivotal role later.

Here the plans of both sides ran afoul of one another. Asboth divided his force and led the main contingent on a headlong charge down the main road. Meanwhile, he sent another portion of his force around the bypass along the route Montgomery's cavalry had taken. Seeing this and realizing his whole force could be trapped, Montgomery attempted to pull out, but it was too late. The homeguard and militia at the barricades would not budge.

Unaware of what awaited him, Asboth's wing of the attack rounded the corner straight into a scorching volley by the waiting homeguard. Asboth was wounded in the face and he lost many other senior officers in this volley. Despite being stunned, the Union cavalry rapidly overwhelmed the Confederate cavalry and pushed down the road in pursuit as the flanking force swept in from behind. Many of the Rebel troopers were able to push their way past the Union flanking force and escape, but many homeguards, conscripts, and militia were pinned in town. Colonel Montgomery was captured while attempting to flee to the Chipola River bridge. His escaping cavalry took up positions on the other shore and were able to deter the Union forces from crossing the bridge.

In town, the remaining defenders on the south side of the street broke and ran, but those near the church stubbornly held out as the detachment of U.S. Colored Troops engaged them. A dismounted bayonet charge finally forced their surrender. However, several Confederates continued to fire from the church and nearby homes. This led to the church being set ablaze and the defenders shot down as they were smoked out.

== Casualties ==
When the fighting ended, some 10 Confederates lay dead or dying, 16 were wounded, 54 were captured and 13 of these were released. Among the wounded was dentist Thaddeus Hentz, a son of famed novelist Caroline Lee Hentz; he was shot not far from his mother's grave.

Union casualties were 8 killed or mortally wounded, 19 wounded, and 10 captured. Among the Federal wounded was General Asboth himself. Prior to the war, Asboth had been a hero of the Hungarian Revolution of 1848 and was one of the men who had surveyed Central Park in New York City. His wound would never heal properly, and he would eventually die of its effects in 1868.

== Aftermath ==
Due to the fiercer-than-expected fighting and high casualties, particularly among the officers, Asboth's plan to turn south toward St. Andrews Bay was cancelled. Instead, that evening and the next morning, the raiders withdrew toward Choctawhatchee Bay. The column brought with it over 600 liberated slaves, 17 wagons filled with captured arms and stores, 200 captured horses, and 400 head of cattle. At Vernon, the force overran Capt. W.B. Jones' scout company, taking more prisoners. In all, 96 prisoners from the various engagements would return with the raiders. (Many of these would die in prison.) The Confederate forces were too few and too far behind to mount an effective pursuit.

It would be decades before the region recovered from the damage inflicted by the raid.
