= Robert Moffett Palmer =

American politician (1820–1862)

Ambassador Robert Moffett Palmer
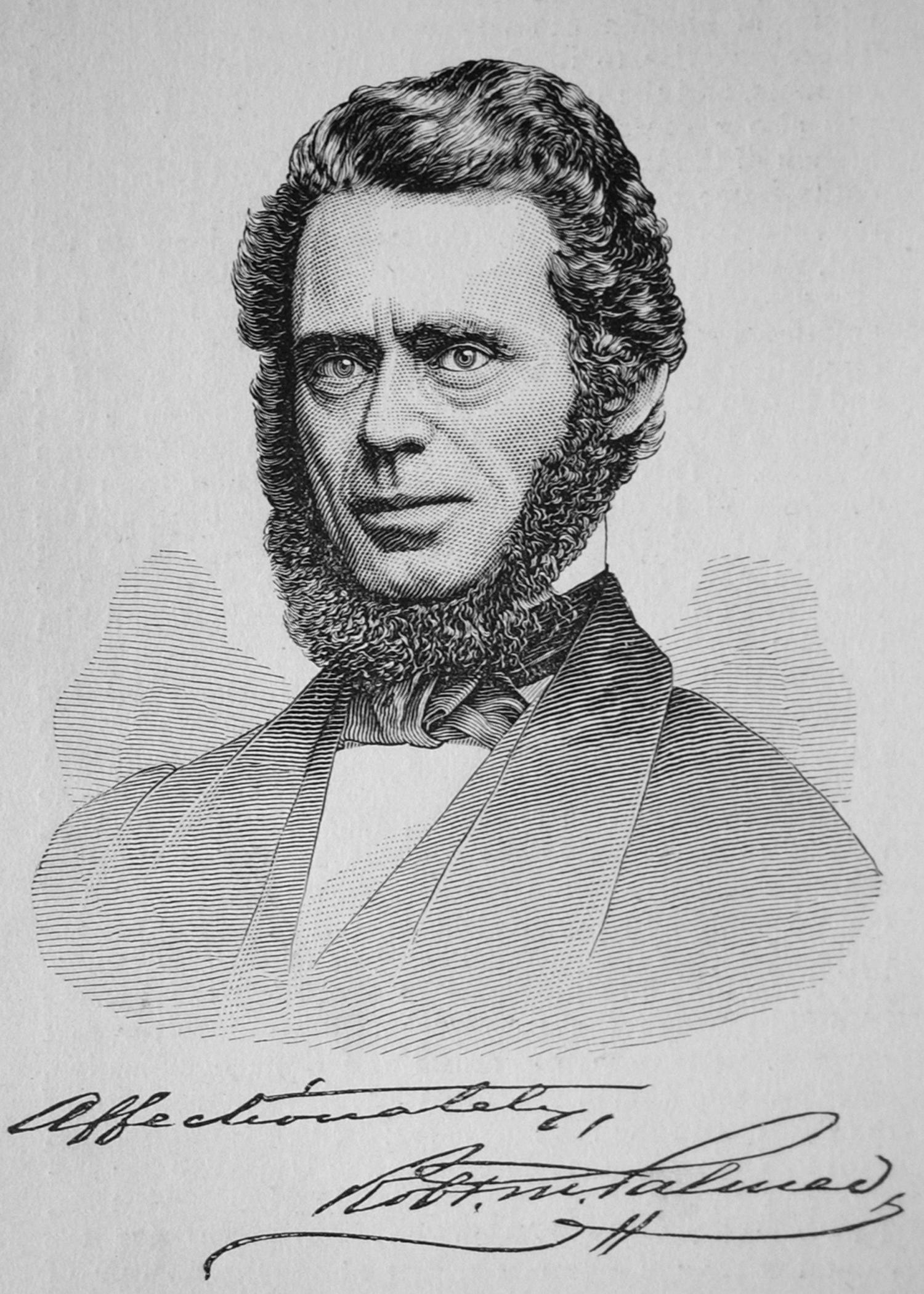

5th United States Minister to Argentina
- In office October 5, 1861 – c. April 12, 1862
- Preceded by: John F. Cushman
- Succeeded by: Robert C. Kirk

Pennsylvania State Senator
- In office 1857–1861

Personal details
- Born: December 14, 1820 Mount Holly, New Jersey
- Died: April 26, 1862 (aged 41) Atlantic Ocean
- Party: Republican
- Spouse: Isabelle Seitzinger
- Children: 6

Robert Moffett Palmer (December 14, 1820 – April 26, 1862) was an American diplomat.

== Biography ==
Palmer was born in Mount Holly, New Jersey on December 14, 1820 to a family of judges and politicians. At age 9 his father moved the family to Pottsville, Pennsylvania and Palmer began learning the trade of printing. He would eventually become editor of the Pottsville Emporium, a local paper, and later marry Isabelle Seitzinger in 1840. In 1845 he would join the bar before going on to be appointed District Attorney of Schuylkill County in 1850.

Palmer was a Republican delegate for Pennsylvania to the Republican National Convention in both 1856 and 1860.

Palmer would take a seat in the Pennsylvania State Senate in 1859 as a Republican. He would eventually becoming Speaker of the Senate in 1860 and get reelected in 1861.

While serving as the Speaker, Palmer would be selected by President Lincoln to serve as the United States' Minister Resident to the Argentine Confederation. He would represent the United States to Argentina from 1861 to April 12, 1862. On February 25, 1862, he would move the U.S. legation from Parana back to Buenos Aires, following the reunification of the country.

Palmer died on April 26, 1862, off the coast of Brazil, aboard a ship that was returning to the United States from Argentina. His body was buried at sea in the Atlantic Ocean. He died leaving a widow and 6 children.
