= Robert C. Kirk =

American politician

6th and 9th United States Minister to Argentina
- In office June 21, 1862 – July 26, 1866
- Preceded by: Robert M. Palmer
- Succeeded by: Alexander Asboth
- In office July 8, 1869 – November 4, 1871
- Preceded by: Henry G. Worthington
- Succeeded by: Julius White

Personal details
- Born: Robert Crothers Kirk; February 26, 1821 Mount Pleasant, Ohio, US
- Died: 1898 Mount Vernon, Ohio, US
- Spouse(s): Eleanor (nee Hogg) (m. 1843, div. ?); Alice V. (nee Hutchison) (m. 1893)
- Education: Franklin College; Ohio University; University of Pennsylvania

Robert Crothers Kirk (February 26, 1821 – 1898) was an American politician who served as the fifth lieutenant governor of Ohio from 1860 to 1862 under Governor William Dennison.

== Biography ==
Robert Crothers Kirk was born February 26, 1821, in Mount Pleasant, Jefferson County, Ohio. He attended the schools in Mount Pleasant and entered Franklin College in New Athens, Ohio, but did not graduate. Other sources say he entered Ohio University in Athens, Ohio. He returned to his native town and studied medicine, and then took a course at University of Pennsylvania medical school in Philadelphia.

Kirk moved to Fulton County, Illinois, and began a medical practice. Some years later, he returned to Ohio and was in the mercantile business in Mount Vernon. He moved to Winona, Minnesota, for a year and then returned to Mount Vernon.

== Career ==
In 1855, he was elected to the Ohio State Senate, and in 1859 he was elected Lieutenant Governor on the Republican ticket, serving a two-year term. Three years later, President Lincoln appointed him Minister to the Argentine Republic. He resigned in 1866 and returned to Ohio.

In 1869, President Grant appointed Kirk to be the Minister to Argentina and Uruguay. He resigned in 1871. In 1873, Governor Noyes appointed him Commissioner to represent Ohio at the Vienna Exposition. In 1875, he was appointed Collector of Internal Revenue for the Thirteenth Ohio District. He later returned to private life in Mount Vernon.

== Family life ==
On December 11, 1843, Kirk married Eleanor Hogg, of Mt. Pleasant. They had four children. Kirk married a second time to Alice V. Hutchison on August 31, 1893. He was a Freemason and member of I.O.O.F. and the Methodist Episcopal Church.

== Death ==
Kirk died in 1898 at age 77.

== See also ==
- United States Ambassador to Argentina
- United States Ambassador to Uruguay

Political offices
Preceded by Martin Welker	Lieutenant Governor of Ohio; 1860-1862	Succeeded by Benjamin Stanton
Diplomatic posts
Preceded by Robert M. Palmer	Minister Resident to Argentina; June 21, 1862-July 26, 1866	Succeeded by Alexander Asboth
Preceded by Henry G. Worthington	Minister Resident to Argentina; July 8, 1869-November 4, 1871	Succeeded by Julius White
Preceded by Henry G. Worthington	Minister Resident to Uruguay; July 24, 1869-July 6, 1870	Succeeded by John L. Stevens
Ohio Senate
Preceded by John T. Creigh	Senator from 17th District; 1856-1857	Succeeded by David Miles
