= List of ambassadors of the United States to Argentina =

Ambassador of the United States to Argentina
- Embajador de los Estados Unidos en Argentina
- Seal of the United States Department of State

- Flag of a United States ambassador

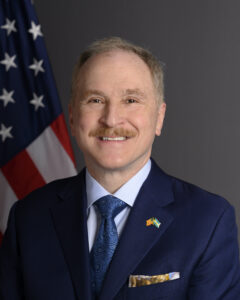
- Incumbent; Peter Lamelas since November 4, 2025
- Style: The Honorable (formal); Mr. Ambassador (informal)
- Residence: Bosch Palace
- Nominator: The president of the United States
- Appointer: The president with Senate advice and consent
- Term length: At the pleasure of the president No fixed term
- Inaugural holder: Caesar A. Rodney as Minister Plenipotentiary
- Formation: December 27, 1823
- Website: U.S. Embassy in Argentina

The United States ambassador to Argentina is the official representative of the president of the United States to the head of state of Argentina.

Argentina had declared its independence from Spain in 1816 and there followed a series of revolutionary wars until 1861 when the nation was united. The United States recognized the government of Buenos Aires, the predecessor to Argentina, on January 27, 1823. Caesar Augustus Rodney was appointed as American Minister Plenipotentiary to Buenos Aires. Between 1854 and 1866, U.S. ambassadors were commissioned to the Argentine Confederation. Since 1867, ambassadors have been commissioned to the Argentine Republic.

Diplomatic relations between the U.S. and Argentina were interrupted but not severed in June 1944 when the U.S. government recalled its ambassador in a dispute with the newly appointed dictator Edelmiro Julián Farrell. The U.S. government believed that Farrell was not committed to the defense of the Western Hemisphere against the Axis powers. Normal relations were resumed with the appointment of a new ambassador in April 1945 when Argentina declared war against Germany.

The official residence of the U.S. Ambassador in Buenos Aires is the Bosch Palace, listed on the State Department's Register of Culturally Significant Property.

== Ambassadors and chiefs of mission ==
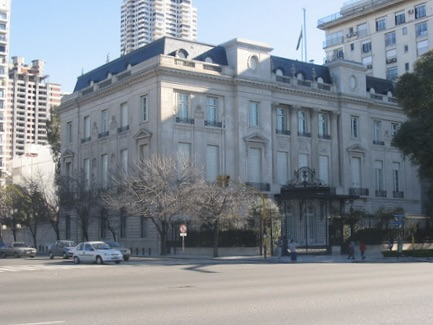
Bosch Palace, the residence of the U.S. ambassador

#	Name	Appointed	Presented credentials	Terminated mission	Notes
1	Caesar A. Rodney	January 27, 1823	December 27, 1823	Died at post, June 10, 1824	
-	John Murray Forbes	March 9, 1825	August 20, 1825	Died at post June 14, 1831	Chargé d'affaires
-	Francis Baylies	January 3, 1832	June 15, 1832	September 26, 1832	Chargé d'affaires
-	William Brent, Jr.	June 14, 1844	November 15, 1844	Presented recall July 7, 1846	Chargé d'affaires
-	William A. Harris	February 19, 1846	July 7, 1846	Probably presented recall before September 12, 1851	Chargé d'affaires
-	John S. Pendleton	February 27, 1851	September 12, 1851 or soon thereafter	Relinquished charge from Montevideo, Uruguay March 31, 1854	Chargé d'affaires
2	James A. Peden	June 29, 1854	December 1, 1854	Presented recall December 1, 1858	Office upgraded to Minister Resident. U.S. Legation moved to Paraná.
3	Benjamin C. Yancey	June 14, 1858	December 1, 1858	Transmitted recall by note from Montevideo, Uruguay, September 30, 1859	
4	John F. Cushman	July 18, 1859	December 22, 1859	Relinquished charge February 17, 1861	U.S. Legation moved back from Paraná to Buenos Aires in 1862.
5	Robert M. Palmer	March 28, 1861	October 5, 1861	about April 12, 1862	
6	Robert C. Kirk	March 4, 1862	June 21, 1862	July 26, 1866	
7	Alexander Asboth	March 12, 1866	October 20, 1866	Died at post January 21, 1868	
8	Henry G. Worthington	June 5, 1868	September 11, 1868	Presented recall July 8, 1869	
9	Robert C. Kirk	April 16, 1869	July 8, 1869	Presented recall November 4, 1871	
10	Julius White	December 12, 1872	May 6, 1873	November 14, 1873	
11	Thomas O. Osborn	February 10, 1874	May 21, 1874	Probably presented recall on or before October 15, 1885	Title/office upgraded to Minister Resident/Consul General
12	Bayless W. Hanna	June 17, 1885	October 15, 1885	July 8, 1889	Title/office upgraded to Envoy Extraordinary and Minister Plenipotentiary in 1887.
13	John R. G. Pitkin	July 26, 1889	October 31, 1889	August 15, 1893	
14	William I. Buchanan	January 26, 1894	May 19, 1894	July 11, 1899	
15	William Paine Lord	October 16, 1899	February 14, 1900	March 27, 1903	
16	John Barrett	July 2, 1903	December 21, 1903	April 27, 1904	
17	Arthur M. Beaupre	March 17, 1904	June 17, 1904	May 2, 1908	
18	Spencer F. Eddy	April 2, 1908	August 27, 1908	January 2, 1909	
19	Charles Hitchcock Sherrill	April 1, 1909	June 30, 1909	September 16, 1910	
20	John W. Garrett – Career FSO	December 14, 1911	February 29, 1912	November 22, 1913	
21	Frederic Jesup Stimson – Political appointee	October 1, 1914	January 8, 1915	April 21, 1921	In 1914 the office of Envoy was upgraded to Ambassador Extraordinary and Plenipotentiary.
22	John W. Riddle – Career FSO	November 18, 1921	March 8, 1922	May 28, 1925	
23	Peter Augustus Jay – Career FSO	March 18, 1925	September 24, 1925	December 30, 1926	
24	Robert Woods Bliss – Career FSO	February 17, 1927	September 9, 1927	April 29, 1933	
25	Alexander W. Weddell – Career FSO	June 3, 1933	September 18, 1933	October 29, 1938	
26	Norman Armour – Career FSO	May 18, 1939	June 19, 1939	Recalled June 27, 1944; left post June 29, 1944	Normal diplomatic relations interrupted from February 1944 to April 1945
27	Spruille Braden – Political appointee	May 8, 1945	May 21, 1945	September 23, 1945	
28	George S. Messersmith – Career FSO	April 12, 1946	May 23, 1946	June 12, 1947	
29	James Cabell Bruce – Political appointee	July 12, 1947	August 21, 1947	August 20, 1949	
30	Stanton Griffis – Political appointee	September 22, 1949	November 17, 1949	September 23, 1950	
31	Ellsworth Bunker – Political appointee	March 13, 1951	May 8, 1951	March 12, 1952	
32	Albert F. Nufer – Career FSO	May 29, 1952	August 14, 1952	May 12, 1956	
33	Willard L. Beaulac – Career FSO	May 10, 1956	June 1, 1956	August 2, 1960	
34	Roy R. Rubottom, Jr. – Career FSO	August 27, 1960	October 20, 1960	October 19, 1961	
35	Robert M. McClintock – Career FSO	February 6, 1962	February 14, 1962	May 10, 1964	
36	Edwin M. Martin – Career FSO	January 29, 1964	June 11, 1964	January 5, 1968	
37	Carter L. Burgess – Political appointee	July 24, 1968	August 21, 1968	March 14, 1969	
38	John Davis Lodge – Political appointee	May 27, 1969	July 23, 1969	November 10, 1973	
39	Robert C. Hill – Political appointee	December 19, 1973	February 15, 1974	May 10, 1977	
40	Raul Hector Castro – Political appointee	September 15, 1977	November 16, 1977	July 30, 1980	
41	Harry W. Shlaudeman – Career FSO	October 2, 1980	November 4, 1980	August 26, 1983	
42	Frank V. Ortiz, Jr. – Career FSO	November 18, 1983	November 29, 1983	August 29, 1986	
43	Theodore E. Gildred – Political appointee	October 16, 1986	November 6, 1986	May 31, 1989	
44	Terence A. Todman – Career FSO	April 20, 1989	June 13, 1989	June 28, 1993	
45	James Richard Cheek – Career FSO	May 28, 1993	July 19, 1993	December 18, 1996	
-	Ronald D. Godard – Career FSO	—	December 18, 1996	October 1997	Chargé d'affaires
-	Manuel Rocha – Career FSO	—	October 1997	July 3, 2000	Chargé d'affaires
46	James Donald Walsh – Career FSO	June 14, 2000	July 3, 2000	May 21, 2003	
47	Lino Gutierrez – Career FSO	April 16, 2003	October 15, 2003	April 8, 2006	
48	Earl Anthony Wayne – Career FSO	August 1, 2006	January 19, 2007	April 6, 2009	
49	Vilma Socorro Martínez – Political appointee	July 24, 2009	September 18, 2009	July 6, 2013	
50	Noah Mamet – political appointee	December 2, 2014	January 21, 2015	January 20, 2017	
51	Edward C. Prado – political appointee	March 22, 2018	May 15, 2018	January 20, 2021	
-	MaryKay Carlson – Career FSO	January 20, 2021		January 24, 2022	Chargé d'affaires
52	Marc Stanley – political appointee	December 18, 2021	January 24, 2022	January 17, 2025	
-	Abigail L. Dressel	January 17, 2025		June 27, 2025	Chargé d'affaires
-	Lydia Barraza	June 27, 2025		July 11, 2025	Chargé d'affaires
-	Heidi G. Rápalo	July 11, 2025		October 31, 2025	Chargé d'affaires
53	Peter Lamelas – political appointee	September 18, 2025	November 4, 2025	Present	

== See also ==
- Argentina – United States relations
- Foreign relations of Argentina
- Ambassadors of the United States
