= Vilma Socorro Martínez =

American diplomat

Vilma Martínez
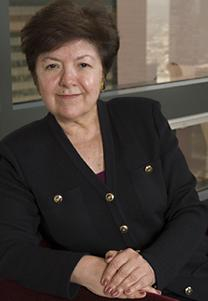

49th United States Ambassador to Argentina
- In office September 18, 2009 – July 4, 2013
- President: Barack Obama
- Preceded by: Earl Wayne
- Succeeded by: Noah Mamet

Personal details
- Born: October 17, 1943 (age 83) San Antonio, Texas, U.S.
- Party: Democratic
- Spouse: Stuart Singer
- Children: 2
- Education: University of Texas, Austin (BA); Columbia University (JD)

Vilma Socorro Martínez (born October 17, 1943) is an American lawyer, civil rights activist and diplomat who formerly served as the U.S. ambassador to Argentina from 2009 to 2013 under President Barack Obama.

== Biography ==
=== Early life ===
Vilma Socorro Martínez was born to Marina and Salvador Martínez, a Mexican-American couple living in San Antonio, Texas. She studied at the University of Texas at Austin. After receiving her bachelor's degree, Martínez went on to Columbia Law School and graduated in 1967.

=== Legal career ===
Vilma Socorro Martínez then joined the NAACP Legal Defense and Educational Fund (LDF). At LDF, she defended a number of poor and minority clients. She also served as the attorney for the petitioner in the case of Griggs v. Duke Power Company, a landmark action that ultimately went before the U.S. Supreme Court and helped establish the doctrine of affirmative action. In 1970, Martínez became an equal opportunity counselor for the New York State Division of Human Rights, where, she created new rules and procedures governing the rights of employees.

In 1971 she joined the firm of Cahill, Gordon & Reindel in New York City, where she worked as a labor lawyer. She was among the first women to join the board of the Mexican American Legal Defense and Educational Fund (MALDEF). Soon afterward, in 1973, Martínez was hired as the advocacy organization's general counsel and president. She directed a program to help secure an extension of the Voting Rights Act to include Mexican Americans among the groups it protected. In 1975, Congress agreed to extend the existing provisions of the Voting Rights Act to include Mexican Americans.

Martínez was the lead attorney for the plaintiffs in a 1974 ruling from the Tenth Circuit Court that guaranteed the right to a bilingual education for non English-speaking children in the Portales, New Mexico Municipal School District. The case, known as Serna v. Portales, was brought by Romana Serna on behalf of her daughter, Judy Serna, who attended the Portales Municipal School District. The ruling was enforceable in all states within the U.S. Tenth Circuit: New Mexico, Colorado, Utah, Wyoming, Kansas, Oklahoma. The decision expanded the language rights of public school children outlined in the Lau v. Nichols U.S. Supreme Court case, which was decided earlier the same year. The Lau case mandated schools, not students, bear the responsibility of addressing the language needs of the students; however, it gave little guidance as to how. Bilingual education was a mere suggestion. The Serna case made explicit the right of minority language students to be taught at school not only in English, but in their home languages. In addition to a right to a bilingual education, the case asserted the students' right to a culturally relevant curriculum and to have as their teachers, administrators, and other school staff competent adults whose cultural and linguistic identities reflected those of the minority students. At the time of the suit, there were no teachers or other staff at any of the district's schools who were Spanish surnamed, or who spoke Spanish, or who could teach in Spanish, even though 34% of the students in the district's four elementary schools and 29% and 17% at the junior and senior high schools, respectively, were so identified.

From 1977 to 1981, Vilma Socorro Martínez joined an advisory board that reviewed appointments to ambassadorial positions around the world. In 1982, Vilma Socorro Martínez became a partner at the law firm Munger, Tolles & Olson, specializing in resolving labor disputes. Since the 1990s, she was a consultant to the U.S. Commission on Civil Rights, and a lawyer delegate to the Ninth Circuit Judicial Conference.

=== US ambassador to Argentina ===
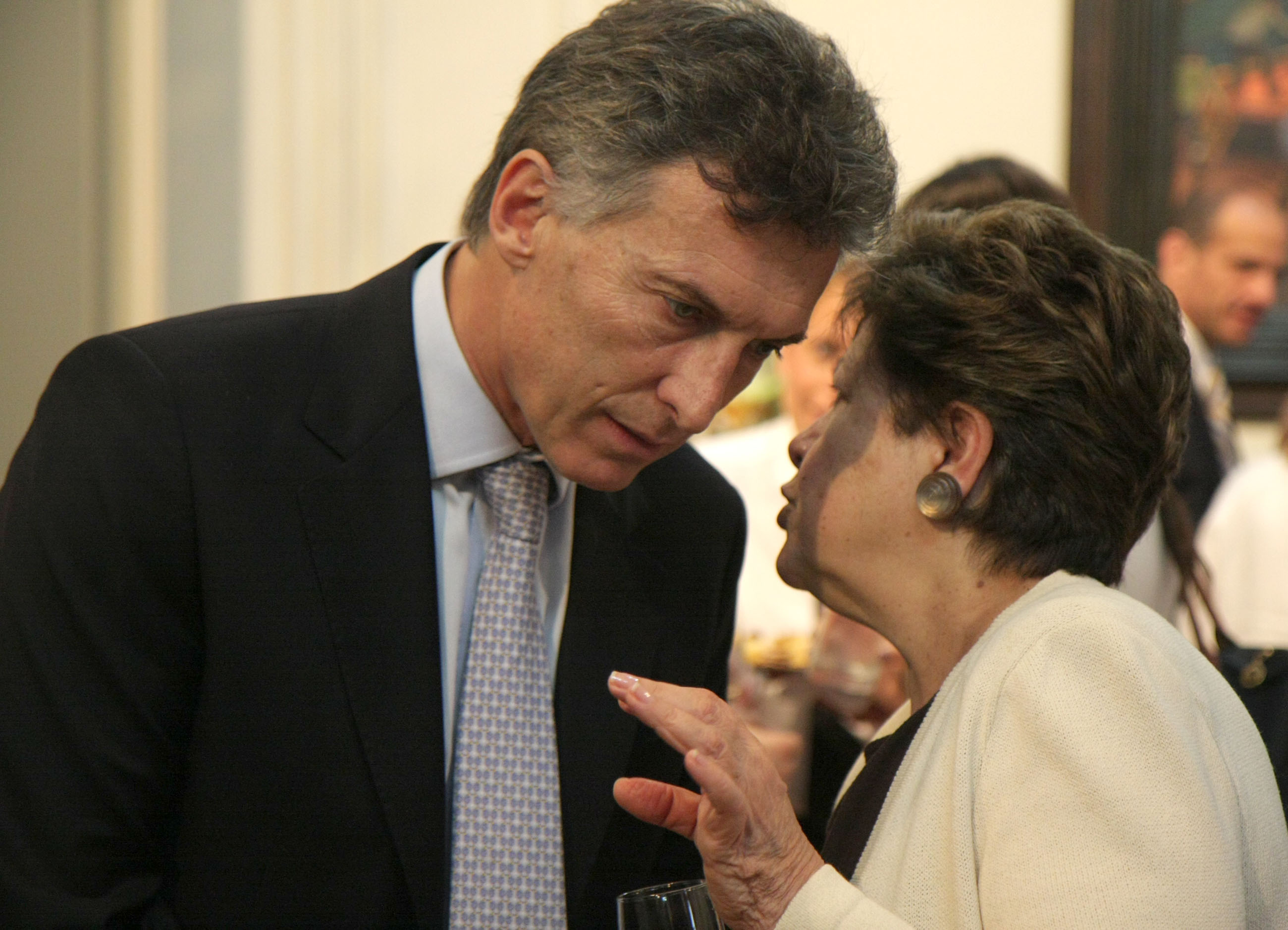
Buenos Aires, 15 December 2011. Mauricio Macri and Vilma Socorro Martinez.

In 2009, Vilma Socorro Martínez was named United States Ambassador to Argentina, the first woman to represent the United States in Buenos Aires as ambassador. She had never been to Argentina before accepting the position. Her role included the diplomatic management of the NASA-CONAE project that launched the SAC-D satellite into space, She ended her tenure in Argentina on July 4, 2013.

In a leaked diplomatic cable, she described Mauricio Macri, who intended to run for the 2011 elections, as "uneducated". Il also appeared that he asked Vilma Socorro Martínez to be stiffer with then-President Cristina Fernández de Kirchner.

== Other roles ==
- 1976-1990: Board of Regents of the University of California (and Chairman from 1984 to 1986)
- 1983-2007: Director of the board of Anheuser-Busch (first corporate donor to MALDEF)
- 1993: Director of the board of Fluor
- 1998: Director of the board Burlington Northern Santa Fe railroad
- 1998: Director of the board of Shell Oil
- Director of the board of Sanwa Bank California
- Director of the board of Bank of the West
- Member of Washington D.C.–based think tank the Inter-American Dialogue
- Member of Walmart's Employment Advisory Panel

== Awards ==
- 1976: Samuel S. Beard Award for Greatest Public Service by an Individual 35 Years or Under, by the Jefferson Awards for Public Service.
- 1988: Distinguished Alumnus Award by the University of Texas
- American Bar Association's Margaret Brent Award
- Columbia University Medal for Excellence
- 2013: Grand Cross of the Order of May

== Personal life ==
Vilma Socorro Martínez is married to an attorney, Stuart Singer, and has two sons, Carlos and Ricardo.

== See also ==
- List of first women lawyers and judges in the United States

Diplomatic posts
Preceded by Earl Wayne	U.S. Ambassador to Argentina; 2009–2013	Succeeded by Noah Mamet
