= Gallberry =

Gallberry is a common name for two similar shrubs in the holly family (Aquifoliaceae):

- Ilex coriacea
- Ilex glabra

Both are native to coastal areas in the United States from Virginia to Texas. They exist primarily as understory plants in pine woods, and are stimulated by regular controlled burning.

They have been widely planted north of their native range and to some extent in Europe, preferring moist, but not waterlogged, acidic soil.

The plants are an important nectar source for beekeepers, making a mild flavored, light colored honey, especially in Florida, South Carolina, and Georgia.
