= Peter Lamelas =

American diplomat

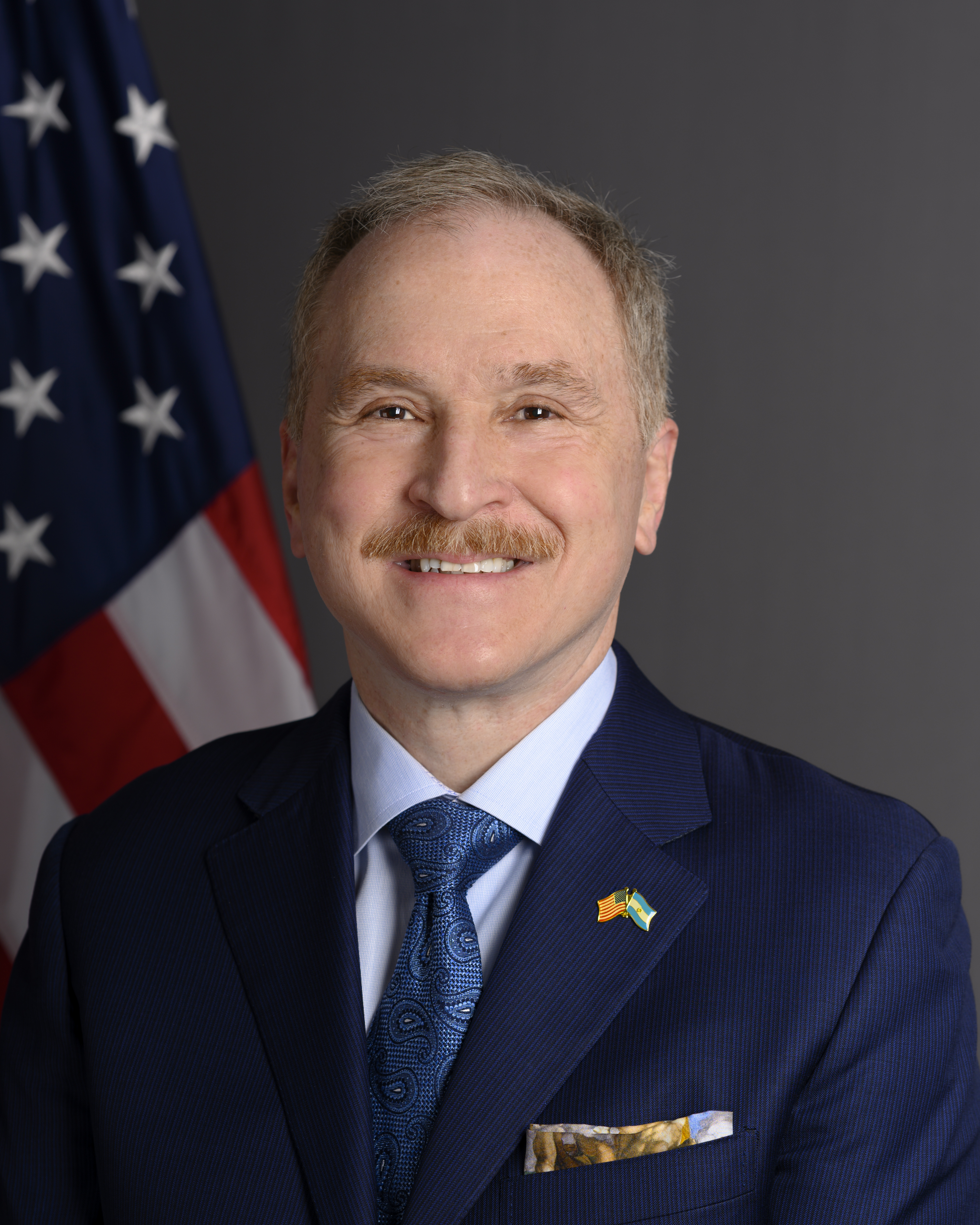
- Official portrait, 2025

53rd United States Ambassador to Argentina
- Incumbent
- Assumed office November 4, 2025
- President: Donald Trump
- Preceded by: Marc Stanley

Personal details
- Born: December 1958 (age 67) Cuba
- Education: Universidad Central del Este (MD); Nova Southeastern University (MBA)

Peter Lamelas (born December 1958) is a Cuban-American diplomat, physician, and entrepreneur who has served as the United States ambassador to Argentina since 2025. He is a major donor to the Republican Party donating over $600,000 to Republicans in the 2024 United States presidential election. Lamelas is also the founder and former CEO of MD Now Urgent Care, an urgent care network in Florida.

== Early life and education ==
Peter Lamelas was born in Cuba and immigrated to the United States as a child with his family. Lamelas pursued higher education in medicine, earning an M.D. from Universidad Central del Este and later completing an M.B.A. at Nova Southeastern University.

== Early career ==
Lamelas is the founder and former CEO of MD Now Urgent Care, which he expanded into one of Florida's largest urgent care networks. Under his leadership, the company partnered with two private equity firms and became a leading healthcare provider in the nation. He also serves as a Board Advisor to MD Now and has over 20 years of experience in emergency medicine and emergency medical services.

In addition to his entrepreneurial activities, Lamelas has been actively involved in medical governance. He served on the Florida Board of Medicine, appointed by then-governor Jeb Bush, and was a member of the board of directors for the Urgent Care Association of America. He has also contributed to community service through various non-profit organizations in South Florida.

=== Political appointments ===
During Donald Trump's first presidential term, Lamelas was appointed to the Department of Justice's Medal of Valor Review board, which honors first responders for acts of extraordinary valor.

== United States ambassador to Argentina (2025–present) ==
On December 11, 2024, President-elect Donald Trump announced he would nominate Lamelas as the United States ambassador to Argentina. Trump's nomination emphasized Lamelas's medical and business credentials, as well as his personal story as a Cuban refugee. Trump described him as "a physician, philanthropist, and an incredible businessman".

Lamelas has already engaged diplomatically with Argentina's leadership, having met President Javier Milei during Milei's visit to Mar-a-Lago in November 2024.

Lamelas donated $250,000 to the Second inauguration of Donald Trump

During his confirmation hearing in July 2025, Lamelas explained that his objectives were to make Argentina a “partner of choice” for the United States. In the context of the rivalry between Argentina and the United Kingdom over control of the Falkland Islands, he reiterated the “neutrality” of the United States on this issue. Lamelas confirmed his intention to combat the influence of certain countries in Argentina, such as China and Venezuela. He also announced his support for the judicial proceedings against former President Cristina Fernández de Kirchner.

On September 18, 2025, Lamelas was confirmed by the Senate. He presented his credentials to President Javier Milei on November 4, 2025.
