= Embassy of Argentina, Washington, D.C. =

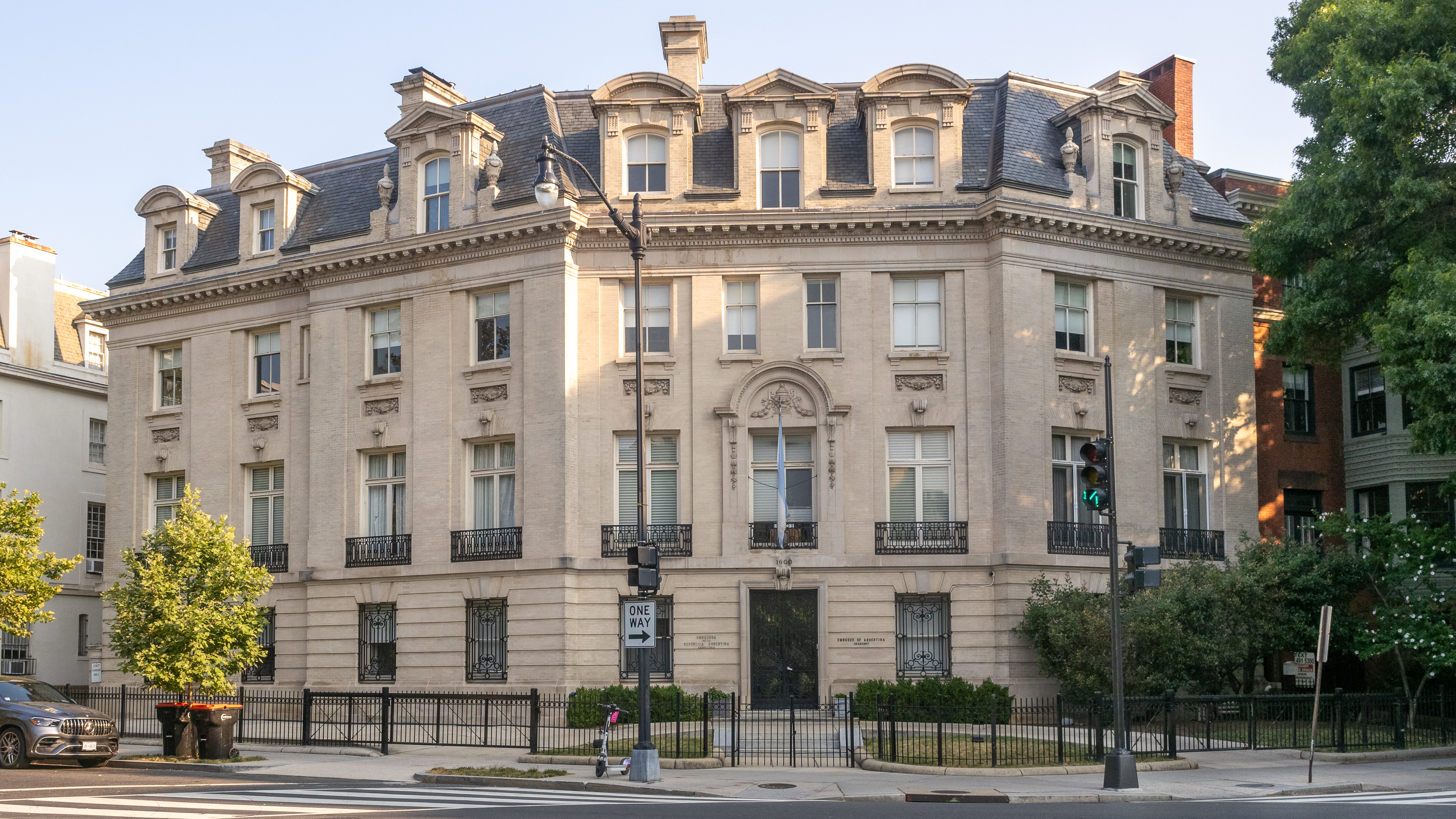
- Location: Washington, D.C.
- Address: 1600 New Hampshire Avenue, N.W.
- Coordinates: 38°54′40″N 77°2′32″W

The Embassy of Argentina in Washington, D.C. is the Argentine Republic's diplomatic mission to the United States. It is located at 1600 New Hampshire Avenue, Northwest, Washington, D.C. The current Ambassador of Argentina to the USA is Alec Oxenford.

== Chancery ==
Located in the neighborhood of Dupont Circle and commissioned in 1906 by Pennsylvania Congressman George Franklin Huff, the mansion at 1600 New Hampshire Avenue NW was designed by Julian Abele (1881–1950), the first African-American graduate of the University of Pennsylvania's architecture program, when he was working with Horace Trumbauer. Huff was a delegate to the 1880 Republican National Convention, and member of the Pennsylvania State Senate (1884–1888). In 1891, he was elected to the Fifty-second Congress and reelected for five more terms. Married to Henrietta Burrell, he and his wife were the parents of eight children.

The Argentine Government purchased the building on February 20, 1913, from Henrietta Huff, who decided to sell the house after her husband's death in 1912.

Julian Abele designed the Widener Library at Harvard University and several buildings for Duke University in North Carolina, mansions in Newport Rhode Island and New York as well as many buildings in Washington. The ballroom was added in the 1940s by another prominent architect, Clarke Waggaman, for the Embassy of Argentina.

At the beginning of the 20th century Dupont Circle was an upscale suburb of Washington, and the Argentine Republic invested heavily given the importance put on bilateral relations with the U.S. The Argentine Government owns a total of four houses in the block: besides the Embassy's Chancery, the Sarmiento Building next to it housing the Consular Section of the Embassy, and the Ambassador's Official Residence, both of them on Q Street; the Argentine Permanent Mission to the Organization of American States, on Corcoran Street, was built as the horse quarters for the house on New Hampshire Avenue.

In 2019 the Embassy included on its website a revamped section on the history of the building, the neighborhood and the architects.

== See also ==
- Argentina–United States relations
