= Marc Stanley =

American diplomat (born 1957)

Marc Robert Stanley
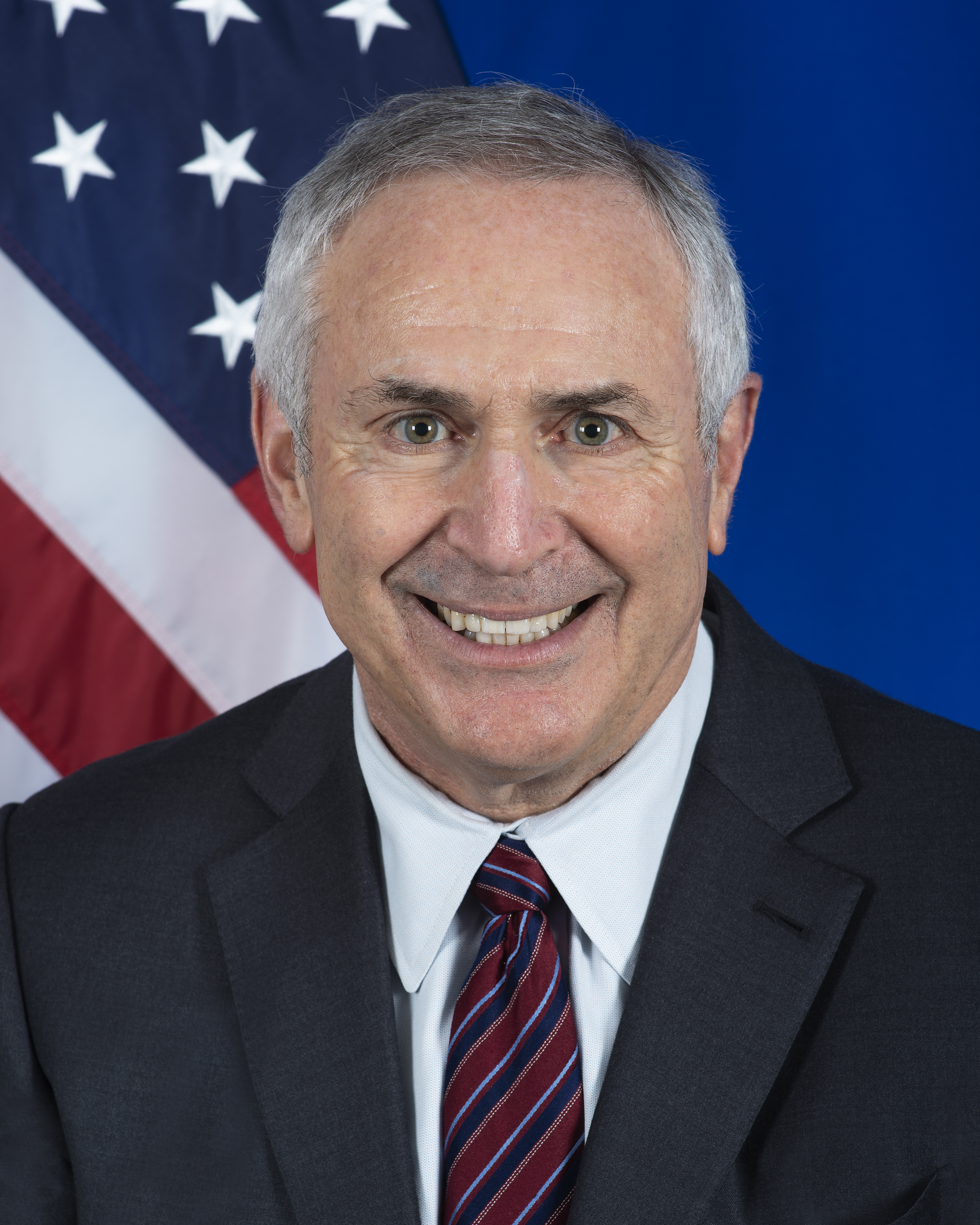

52nd United States Ambassador to Argentina
- In office January 24, 2022 – January 17, 2025
- President: Joe Biden
- Preceded by: Edward C. Prado
- Succeeded by: Peter Lamelas

Personal details
- Born: May 27, 1957 (age 69) Dallas, Texas, U.S.
- Party: Democratic
- Spouse: Wendy Stanley
- Children: 3
- Education: George Washington University (BBA); University of Texas at Austin (JD)

Marc Robert Stanley (born May 27, 1957) is an American diplomat, trial lawyer, political activist, Jewish community leader, and philanthropist. Stanley served as the United States ambassador to Argentina during President Joe Biden's administration.

== Legal career ==
Stanley is Board Certified in Civil Trial Law by the Texas Board of Legal Specialization and he is licensed in Texas and the District of Columbia. Based in Dallas, Texas, from 1982 to 2022 his practice mostly focused on national class actions and litigation.

Stanley served as President of both the Texas Trial Lawyers Association and the Dallas Trial Lawyers Association. He was voted a "Best Lawyer in Dallas" and a "Super Lawyer" for the entire state of Texas for most years when he actively practiced.

== Community service ==
Stanley has served as a board member and leader of many Jewish charitable and political organizations, including six years as Chairman of the National Jewish Democratic Council.

Stanley also chaired the Legacy Senior Communities, Inc., a Jewish-sponsored, not-for-profit charitable organization providing continuing care retirement communities and in-home care for seniors and their families. Additionally, Stanley served on the executive committee of the Israel Policy Forum.

== Political involvement ==
Stanley served as Dallas County chair for Senator Lloyd Bentsen's campaign in 1988 and Governor Ann Richards' campaign from 1989 to 1990. He chaired Martin Frost's campaign for Congress in 2004 and also chaired Lawyers for Biden in 2020. He also co-founded Blue Senate (a PAC in Dallas) and the Texas Democratic Trust. Additionally, he has worked to help hundreds of House, Senate, Gubernatorial and Presidential candidates over the last 40 years.

== Governmental service ==
Stanley's national public service began in college, when he worked four years for the U.S. Congress, serving with Representatives Mo Udall (D-AZ) and Dale Kildee (D-MI), and with the Committee on House Administration as an aide to Chairman Frank Thompson (D-NJ). In that role, he created the first Telephone Directory for the U.S. House of Representatives, serving as its Editor from 1977 to 1979.

He served as chairman of the Texas Public Finance Authority (appointed in 1991 by Texas Governor Ann Richards). Secretary of Defense William Cohen appointed Stanley as a member of the board of visitors of the Air University.

In 2011, Stanley was appointed by President Barack Obama as a council-member of the United States Holocaust Memorial Museum.

== Diplomatic career ==
On August 6, 2021, President Joe Biden announced his intent to nominate Stanley to be the next United States ambassador to Argentina. On August 10, 2021, his nomination was sent to the Senate. Hearings on his nomination were held before the Senate Foreign Relations Committee on October 26, 2021. He was reported out of committee on December 15, 2021, and was confirmed by the Senate via voice vote on December 18, 2021. Judge Karen Gren Scholer, U.S District Court for the Northern District of Texas, administered the oath of office to Stanley on December 21, 2021. He presented his credentials to President Alberto Fernández on January 24, 2022.

Upon his arrival in Argentina, Stanley summarized his goals as Ambassador using the acronym FCTT – Friendship, Cooperation, Trade, and Tourism. At a time when the Argentine government seemed increasingly aligned with China and Russia, Stanley sought to revitalize U.S.-Argentina relations by positioning himself as the antigrieta (anti-rift) Ambassador. Stanley famously stated during meetings with politicians from across the political spectrum that the U.S. does not choose Argentina's leaders; it only chooses to work with Argentine leaders, adding that the only side chosen by the U.S. in Argentine politics is "the side of the 46 million Argentines". Stanley's anti-rift stance meant that he often surprised the media by approaching figures not typically aligned with the United States, including then Vice President Cristina Fernández de Kirchner, labor leaders Hugo Yasky and Roberto Baradel, and left-wing social leader and presidential candidate Juan Grabois.

Stanley also became the first U.S. Ambassador in living memory to visit all 23 provinces in Argentina. Having pledged to visit all provinces in a statement he delivered before the Senate Foreign Relations Committee, Stanley fulfilled his promise in September 2024 when he visited the province of San Luis. Asked about his reasons for traveling across Argentina, Stanley frequently remarked that when he looked at the certificate President Biden had given him, it did not say he was Ambassador to Buenos Aires – it said he was Ambassador to Argentina. Stanley believed it was instrumental to his mission to engage with U.S. citizens and companies across Argentina, as well as strengthen the ties binding the United States and the Argentine provincial governments.

=== Russian invasion of Ukraine ===
The Russian invasion of Ukraine began on February 24, 2022, only a month after Stanley arrived in Argentina. Stanley promptly requested that the Argentine government condemn the invasion at the United Nations Human Rights Council, which it was chairing at the time. Stanley made a point of engaging with the Ukrainian community in Argentina, attending public events in support of Ukraine, and bringing the diplomatic corps together to express its support. Stanley succeeded in convening the four leading candidates in the 2023 presidential run to pose with the Ukrainian flag and hold up a sign in support of Ukraine, highlighting the fact that candidates may not agree on many issues, but they all stood with Ukraine.

=== Relations with the Argentine Jewish community ===
Stanley is the first-ever U.S. Ambassador to Argentina of the Jewish faith. As such, he frequently engaged with the Jewish community, and made a point of meeting with representatives of the local Jewish community whenever he traveled out of Buenos Aires. In November 2023, Stanley joined then President-elect and Jewish convert Javier Milei during his visit to the grave of Rabbi Menachem Mendel Schneerson in New York.

During his tenure, Stanley worked closely with prominent Argentine Jewish associations, including AMIA and DAIA. His work included advocating for a way to achieve justice for the Israeli Embassy and AMIA bombings, which took place in 1992 and 1994, respectively. Stanley was a strong supporter of legislation introducing provisions for trial in absentia, allowing perpetrators to be tried even if they refused to appear before Argentine courts.

Shortly after his arrival in Argentina, amid growing antisemitism worldwide, Stanley urged the Fernández administration to appoint a special envoy to monitor and combat antisemitism. Argentina soon appointed Ambassador Fernanda Loguzzo as Latin America's first Special Representative for the Fight Against Antisemitism. In observance of the 30th anniversary of the AMIA bombing, Stanley hosted the Conference of Presidents of Major American Jewish Organizations in Buenos Aires, as well as Special Envoy Deborah Lipstadt and a Congressional Delegation led by Senator Ben Cardin. Ambassador Lipstadt used her visit to present the Global Guidelines to Combat Antisemitism, which over 30 countries adopted during a special gathering of special envoys and representatives from around the world in Argentina.

Immediately following the October 7 attacks perpetrated by Hamas, Stanley joined a demonstration organized in Buenos Aires to condemn the killings. He also participated in events to commemorate the hostages and demand their immediate release. In August 2024, Stanley hosted a reception in honor of the Nova festival exhibit in Buenos Aires to raise awareness about the threat posed by terrorists worldwide.

=== Venezuela ===
In June 2022, Argentina held a plane operated by Venezuela's state-owned Emtrasur line that included an Iranian crew, one member of which had alleged ties to the Quds Force. Stanley followed the case closely, and he worked with the Argentine government to ensure compliance with a U.S. court ruling ordering that the plane be handed over to U.S. authorities for violations of U.S. export control laws. The plane was successfully returned to the United States and scrapped in 2024.

In early August 2024, after the results of the presidential election in Venezuela were announced, Stanley called a meeting of diplomats from 39 countries to demand transparency in Venezuela.

=== Economic cooperation ===
On December 5, 2022, Stanley and then Minister of Economy Sergio Massa signed an agreement to facilitate the implementation of the U.S. Foreign Account Tax Compliance Act (FATCA). This agreement enabled the reciprocal exchange of financial account information between the United States and Argentina to combat tax evasion.

The year 2023 marked 200 years of diplomatic relations between the United States and Argentina. In the context of the war in Ukraine and the global food and energy shortages, Stanley called for increased cooperation between the United States and Argentina to “feed and fuel the world.” This was echoed by U.S. Secretary of State Antony Blinken during his visit to Buenos Aires.

On December 1, 2022, and June 5, 2024, the United States and Argentina concluded the third and fourth meetings of the Trade and Investing Council, respectively, under the U.S.-Argentina Trade and Investment Framework Agreement (TIFA). These meetings helped continue to advance trade and investment, including the diversification of supply chains and sustainable growth in key sectors such as critical minerals. In August 2024, Argentina hosted Under Secretary for Economic Growth, Energy, and the Environment José W. Fernández, who signed a Memorandum of Understanding on Critical Minerals with Argentina.

=== Military and space cooperation ===
In June 2023, against the backdrop of the 200th anniversary of U.S.-Argentina diplomatic relations, the Air National Guards in Georgia and Illinois leased a C-130 Hercules aircraft to the Argentine Air Force for use in disaster relief efforts and support operations in Antarctica. This aircraft was officially transferred to the Argentine Air Force during U.S. SOUTHCOM Commander General Laura Richardson’s visit to Argentina.

Stanley also worked to facilitate Argentina's purchase of 24 second-hand F-16 aircraft from Denmark, thus helping deter Argentina from procuring Chinese JF-17 planes instead. Stanley secured a $40 million donation which will enable Argentina to purchase equipment for these aircraft. Similarly, during Stanley's tenure, the U.S. approved Argentina's purchase of four P-3 Orion aircraft from Norway for surveillance and search and rescue missions in the South Atlantic. The first of these planes was presented to the Argentine Navy in September 2024.

In late April 2024, Argentina received a visit from the U.S. Coast Guard Cutter James to conduct joint drills on the high seas and enhance maritime security. President Javier Milei and Vice President Victoria Villarruel both joined Stanley during separate tours of the cutter. Soon afterward, in June 2024, the aircraft carrier USS George Washington visited Argentina as part of the Southern Seas 2024 mission and conducted exercises with the Argentine Navy. Minister of Defense Luis Petri and Minister of Foreign Affairs, International Trade and Worship Diana Mondino both toured the carrier with Stanley, along with other prominent representatives from the public and private sectors.

Furthermore, Stanley helped increase U.S.-Argentine space cooperation. In July 2023, NASA Administrator Bill Nelson visited Argentina and then Minister of Science, Technology and Innovation Daniel Filmus signed the Artemis Accords on behalf of the Argentine Republic. Argentina thus became the 28th country to sign the Artemis Accords with the United States. It is expected that an Argentine will travel to space for the first time in the next few years in partnership with NASA.

=== Visits ===
During his term as Ambassador, Stanley often encouraged U.S. officials to engage with and visit Argentina, and vice versa. U.S. visitors included Secretary of State Antony Blinken, Secretary of Energy Jennifer Granholm, Deputy Secretary of State Wendy Sherman, SOUTHCOM Commander General Laura Richardson, Special Envoy to Monitor and Combat Antisemitism Deborah Lipstadt, and NASA Administrator Bill Nelson. Additionally, several Congressional delegations traveled to Argentina, including delegations headed by representatives and senators Menendez, Cornyn, Rubio, Rogers, Cardin, and Smith.

In March 2023, Stanley helped organize and supported President Alberto Fernández's visit to the United States, which included a bilateral meeting with President Joe Biden. He also brought a delegation of Argentina's “Norte Grande” governors to the U.S. in order to discuss the region's industrial, touristic, and cultural potential and strengthen trade relations and investment. In 2024, Stanley led the IMPACT (Initiative to Mitigate Pollution and Climate Threats) reverse trade mission, with Argentine, Uruguayan, Paraguayan and Chilean public- and private-sector representatives traveling to California to showcase opportunities in renewable energy and green initiatives.

=== Awards ===
In August 2022, Argentine foundation Centro de Estudios Americanos (CEA) presented Stanley with the Puentes de América Award for his contributions to CEA's bilateral objectives. CEA is a strong advocate of stronger U.S.-Argentine ties and organizes seminars and programs both in Argentina and in the United States for numerous high-level individuals including political leaders, legislators, military and law enforcement officers, business leaders, union leaders, academics, and other professionals.

In June 2024, Centro Ana Frank Argentina para América Latina (CAFA) presented Stanley with an award recognizing his commitment to the preservation of the memory of the Holocaust both in Argentina and in the United States.

In September 2025, The Jerusalem Post recognized Stanley as one of the most influential Jewish people in the world, ranking him 17th on its list of the "50 Most Influential Jews".

== Personal life ==
A native of Dallas, Texas, Stanley graduated from St. Mark's School of Texas in 1975. He then received a Bachelor of Business Administration from the George Washington University in 1979 and a Juris Doctor from the University of Texas School of Law in 1982. He and his wife, Wendy, have three children and four grandchildren. A strong proponent of organ donation, he donated his kidney to an ill Dallas rabbi in 2014.

Diplomatic posts
Preceded by Edward C. Prado	United States Ambassador to Argentina; 2022–2025	Succeeded by Abigail Dressel; Chargé d'affaires
