= Alexander Asboth =

American diplomat

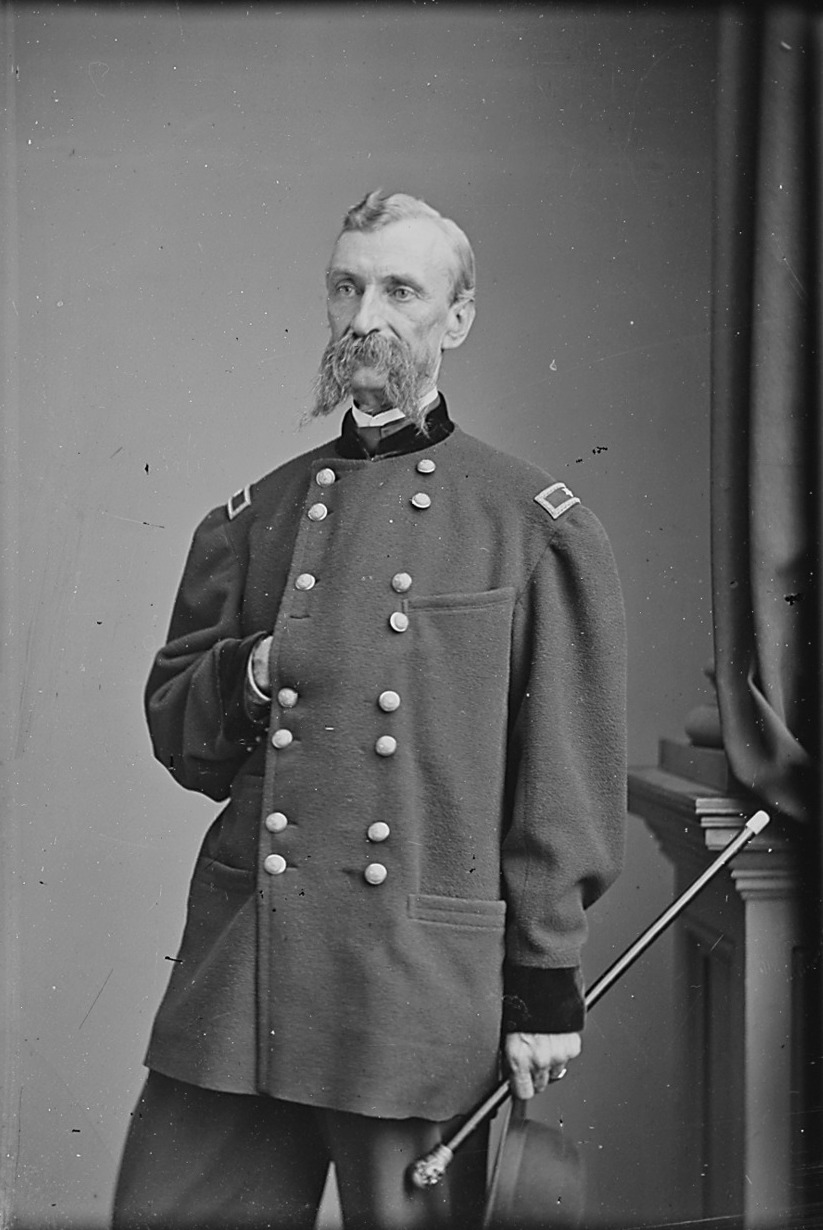
- Alexander Asboth

7th United States Minister to Argentina
- In office March 12th, 1866: Presented credentials October 20th, 1866 – January 21st, 1868
- Nominated by: Andrew Johnson
- Preceded by: Robert C. Kirk
- Succeeded by: Henry G. Worthington

Ambassador of the U.S. to Uruguay
- In office October 2nd, 1867 – January 21, 1868
- Nominated by: Andrew Johnson
- Preceded by: office established
- Succeeded by: Henry G. Worthington

Personal details
- Born: December 18, 1811 Keszthely, Hungary
- Died: January 21, 1868 (aged 56) Buenos Aires, Argentina
- Education: Mining Academy of Selmecbanya; Institutum Geometricum

Military service
- Allegiance: Kingdom of Hungary; United States
- Branch/service: Hungarian Army; United States Army; Union Army
- Years of service: 1836–1849 (Hungary); 1861–1865 (USA)
- Rank: Lieutenant colonel (Hungary); Brigadier General (USA); Brevet Major General
- Battles/wars: Hungarian Revolution of 1848: American Civil War; Battle of Pea Ridge; Siege of Corinth; Battle of Marianna

Alexander "Sandor" Asboth (Hungarian: Asbóth Sándor, December 18, 1811 – January 21, 1868) was a Hungarian military leader best known for his victories as a Union general during the American Civil War. He also served as United States Ambassador to Argentina and as United States Ambassador to Uruguay.

== Early life ==
Asboth was born in Keszthely, Hungary. When Asboth was 8, his family moved to Zombor (now Sombor in Serbia). Asboth wanted to be a soldier, like his elder brother Lajos, but instead his parents decided he should be an engineer. He studied at the Mining Academy of Selmecbánya and the Institutum Geometricum in Pest.

After graduation he worked on the construction of the Széchenyi Chain Bridge as a civilian engineer and later he had some part in the river regulation of the Lower-Danube. He joined with freedom-fighter Lajos Kossuth in the 1848 revolutionary movement. In December 1848 he was promoted to captain. During his time as captain, he took part in the battles of Kápolna and Nagysalló. In the spring of 1849 he was promoted to the rank of major, then he became an adjutant of Kossuth and achieved the rank of lieutenant colonel. Asboth traveled with Kossuth to the Ottoman Empire and then to the United States in 1851, after the revolution failed.

== United States and Civil War ==
Asboth remained in the United States, becoming a U.S. citizen in 1852. He worked with Frederick Olmstead during the surveys of Central Park and the Upper West Side in New York City.

He joined the Union Army at the outbreak of war and attempted to organize a brigade of Hungarian volunteers in New York. Starting in July 1861, he served as chief of staff for General John C. Frémont. Asboth was nominated brigadier general by President Abraham Lincoln on December 26, 1861, and the U.S. Senate confirmed the promotion on March 24, 1862, as the President did not formally make the appointment until March 22, 1862. Asboth was assigned command of the 4th Division in Frémont's western campaign. Asboth later led a division under Samuel Curtis, and during the Arkansas campaign he occupied Bentonville and Fayetteville. He participated in the Battle of Pea Ridge, leading troops at the Little Sugar Creek position. His right arm was fractured by a musket ball while bringing reinforcements to support Colonel Eugene A. Carr. Reinforcements were transferred to Henry Halleck from the Army of the Southwest and during the Siege of Corinth, Asboth commanded a brigade in the Army of the Mississippi.

Asboth later commanded garrisons in Kentucky and Ohio. In August 1863, Asboth was assigned to the District of West Florida, with his headquarters at Fort Pickens. He was badly wounded in the Battle of Marianna on September 27, 1864; his left cheek-bone being broken and his left arm fractured in two places. Asboth was mustered out of the volunteer service on August 24, 1865. On January 13, 1866, President Andrew Johnson nominated Asboth for the award of the brevet grade of major general to rank from March 13, 1865, and the U.S. Senate confirmed the award on March 12, 1866.

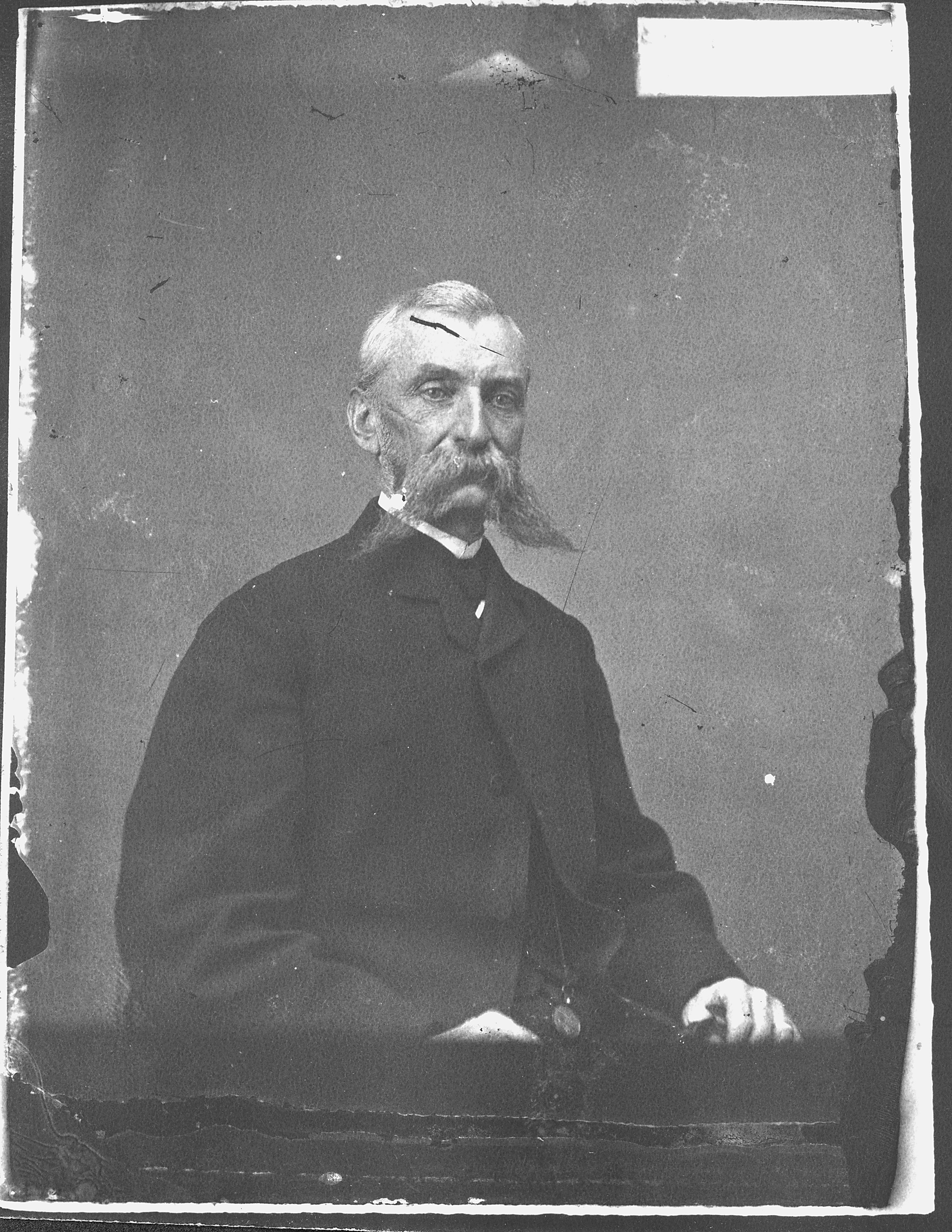
Gen. Alexander Asboth post-war

== Later life and death ==
In 1866, he was appointed U.S. Minister to Argentina and Uruguay. He died in Buenos Aires in 1868, likely due to his wounds received in Florida. He was initially buried in the city's British cemetery, but was re-buried in 1923 when La Chacarita Cemetery became a park. His remains were returned to the United States in October 1990 for burial at Arlington National Cemetery.

== See also ==
- List of American Civil War generals (Union)

== Notes ==
Diplomatic posts
Preceded by Robert C. Kirk	United States Minister Resident, Argentina; October 20, 1866–January 21, 1868	Succeeded by Henry G. Worthington
United States officially recognized Uruguay on October 2, 1867	United States Minister Resident, Uruguay; October 2, 1867–January 21, 1868	Succeeded by Henry G. Worthington
