= Noah Mamet =

American diplomat

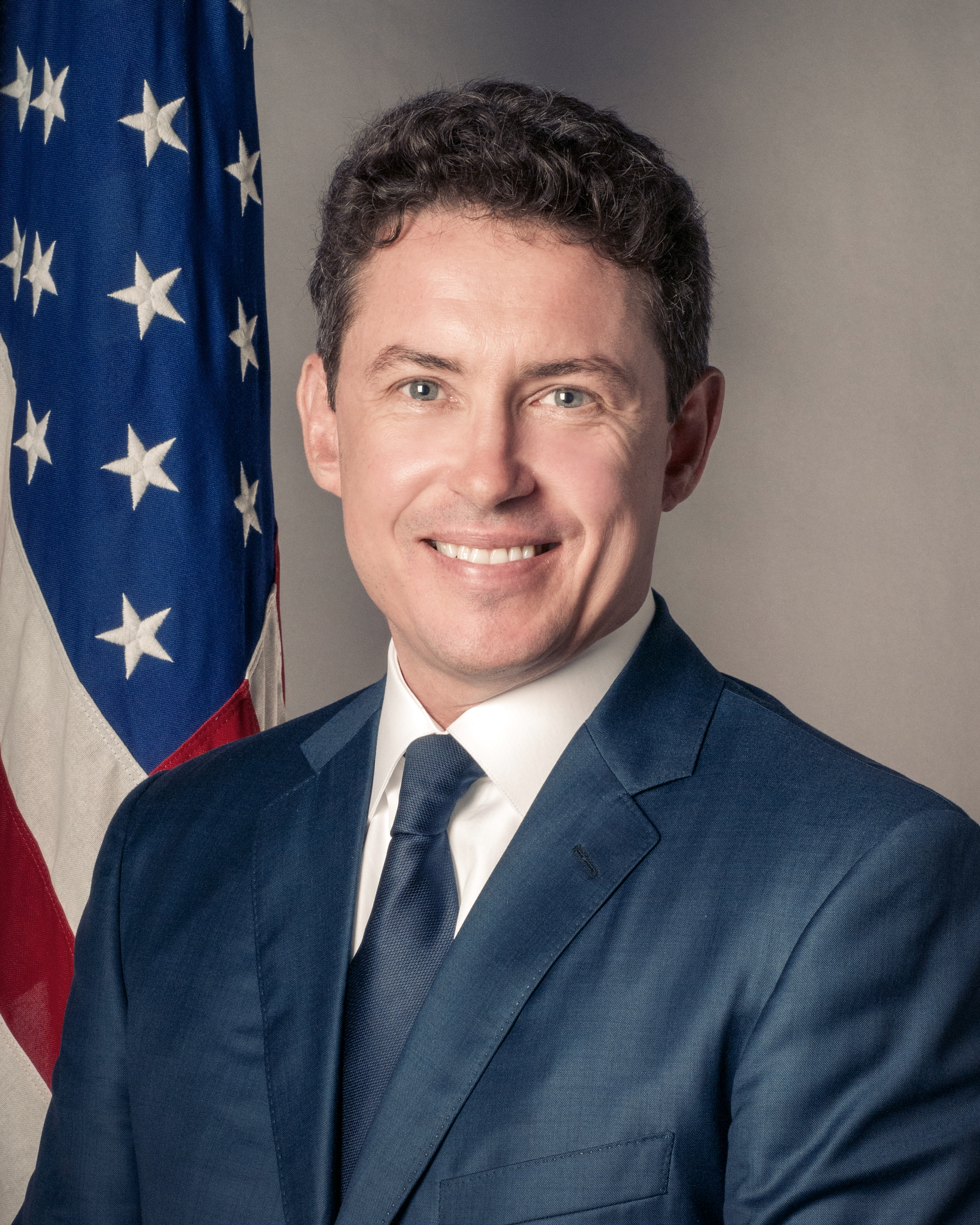

50th United States Ambassador to Argentina
- In office January 16, 2015 – January 20, 2017
- President: Barack Obama
- Preceded by: Vilma Martínez
- Succeeded by: Edward C. Prado

Personal details
- Born: Noah Bryson Mamet; April 8, 1969 (age 57) Manhattan Beach, California, U.S.
- Party: Democratic
- Education: University of California, Los Angeles

Noah Bryson Mamet (pronounced muh-MET; born April 8, 1969) is an American diplomat and businessman who served as the United States Ambassador to Argentina under U.S. President Barack Obama, serving from 2015 to 2017.

He worked as the National Finance Director for House Democratic Leader Richard Gephardt for nine years, and was later a fundraiser for Obama's 2012 re-election campaign. Mamet was nominated as ambassador to Argentina in 2013, which was met with criticism. His appointment was filibustered by Senate Republicans, which was overcome by Senate Democrats. He resigned from office with a letter to the President on December 7, 2016, and left office as ambassador on January 20, 2017.

== Early life and education ==
Mamet was born to a Jewish father and an Irish Catholic mother in Manhattan Beach, California. He attended Mira Costa High School. In 1992, he graduated from the University of California, Los Angeles with a Bachelor of Arts degree.

== Professional career ==
At age 21, Mamet entered politics by working on the 1992 U.S. Senate primary bid by onetime U.S. Rep. Mel Levine. He also worked for the California Democratic Party helping with Bill Clinton's 1992 presidential campaign in Santa Barbara County. From 1995 until 2003, Mamet worked for onetime U.S. Rep. Dick Gephardt while he was House Democratic leader as a senior advisor and national finance director. Mamet also worked on Gephardt's 2004 presidential bid.

In 2004, he founded Noah Mamet and Associates, a business and political consulting firm with offices in Los Angeles and San Francisco.

In 2007, Mamet served on the international delegation for the National Democratic Institute to monitor elections in Sierra Leone. He also has served as an adviser to the Wasserman Family Foundation in Los Angeles.

Mamet raised $3,200,000 for then President Barack Obama's reelection campaign in 2012. He is a member of the National Jewish Democratic Council.

In 2018, Mamet purchased a vineyard in Mendoza, Argentina and began producing wine under the name 'Gran Diplomat Wines.' In November 2023 he opened Canopy Wine Lounge in Palm Springs, California.

== Nomination as U.S. Ambassador to Argentina ==
On July 30, 2013, President Obama announced his intent to nominate Mamet to be the U.S. Ambassador to Argentina. This received criticism from certain political figures, who criticized the fact that Memet had never been to Argentina and contended that he was nominated to the position because of his role in fundraising for Obama. On July 31, 2013, Obama formally nominated Mamet to the post. Mamet's nomination languished for months after his United States Senate Foreign Relations Committee hearing.

On June 24, 2014, the Senate's foreign relations committee voted to forward Mamet's nomination to the full Senate. On November 20, 2014, Senate Majority Leader Harry Reid filed for cloture on Mamet's nomination.

On December 1, 2014, the U.S. Senate voted 50–36 for cloture on Mamet's nomination, thereby ending a Republican-led filibuster of his nomination. On December 2, 2014, the Senate confirmed Mamet in a 50–43 vote and he was sworn in on December 10, 2014. He arrived in Argentina on January 16, 2015, and presented his credentials that same day.

== Ambassador Mamet in Argentina ==
As Ambassador, Mamet stated his desire to build connections between the US and Argentina through science, technology, energy and student exchange.

In December 2015, the US Embassy in Argentina inaugurated its system of 72 solar panels, the first such installation at a U.S. Embassy worldwide. Also in 2015, the Fulbright Commission created the "Friends of Fulbright" scholarship program. The program gives Argentine undergraduate students a short-term opportunity to attend classes at an accredited U.S. university, and is designed for students who cannot afford the costs of an exchange program.

After Mamet's resignation of his position, Argentine Foreign Minister Susana Malcorra presented Mamet with the Order of the Liberator General San Martín, the highest decoration of the Argentine Republic.

In 2017, Mamet joined the advisory board of H Code Media, a digital advertising platform reaching U.S. Hispanic consumers.

== Criticism ==
After his appointment as U.S. ambassador to Argentina, Mamet was criticized for being part of a group of nominated "ambassadors that raised six-figure sums" for President Obama's 2012 reelection campaign, including by websites such as The Washington Examiner and The Huffington Post.

In December 2013, BuzzFeed reported that Mamet's nomination as ambassador to Argentina was "met with surprise, and in some cases anger, by his peers in the donor class. Democratic Party donors complain privately that Mamet unfairly leveraged his clients' work for his own political gain and benefited from a close personal relationship with President Obama's campaign manager, Jim Messina." A group of retired United States Foreign Service officers have since called for an end to the practice of appointing political contributors and supporters as ambassadors. Mamet has also been criticized for lack of "major diplomatic experience" and not visiting Argentina prior to his nomination.

In 2014, fifteen former presidents of the State Department Employees Union (AFSA) made an official request to reject Mamet's nomination to ambassadorship, which also included George Tsunis (for Norway) and Colleen Bell (for Hungary), because "they showed limited knowledge of the countries to which they'd been nominated" at their Senate committee hearings.

AFSA issued a letter to the U.S. State Department urging it to "oppose granting of Senate consent to these three candidates." The letter was the first of its kind, which set a new historical precedent to ambassadorial designations in the U.S.

== Personal ==
Mamet has been a resident of Marina del Rey, California. He is not married and has no children.

== See also ==
- Ambassadors of the United States

Diplomatic posts
Preceded by Vilma Martínez	United States Ambassador to Argentina; 2015–2017	Succeeded by Edward C. Prado
