= Wireless Infrastructure Association =

American trade association

- Formation: 1949; 77 years ago
- Type: Trade Association
- Headquarters: Arlington, Virginia
- Fields: Wireless infrastructure
- Chairman: Jeffrey A. Stoops
- President and CEO: Patrick Halley
- Website: www.wia.org

The Wireless Infrastructure Association (WIA), formerly known as PCIA, is an American trade association for wireless providers and companies that build cell phone towers, rooftop wireless sites, and other facilities that transmit wireless communication signals. The Washington Post described the industry as "the people who build all those cell towers so you can actually make those calls, download that data." These technologies are collectively referred to as "wireless telecommunications infrastructure."

Examples of companies that are members of WIA include American Tower, Ericsson, Graybar, JMA Wireless, Qualcomm, and SBA Communications. In all, member companies own and run more than 125,000 towers and antennas in the U.S.

WIA advocates for a variety of issues before the federal government, on topics such as broadband deployment (the act of building wireless broadband infrastructure in the United States), utility pole attachment (adding wireless signal components to utility poles that already exist), wireless network resiliency, public safety, and wireless competition. WIA hosts an annual conference and trade show called the Connectivity Expo, also known as Connect (X). Previously WIA hosted the Wireless Infrastructure Show.

== People ==
The Chairman of WIA is Jeffrey A. Stoops, president and chief executive officer of SBA Communications Corp. The previous chairman was David Weisman, president of InSite Wireless Group, which was an independent tower company. American Tower announced an agreement to buy InSite's assets in late 2020 for approximately $3,5 billion.

Jonathan Adelstein, a former FCC commissioner, is the president and CEO of WIA. Adelstein worked in public service for 25 years before joining WIA. In February 2014, Adelstein told C-SPAN that his goal was to bring wireless connectivity to everyone in the United States. (Note: Mr. Adelstein's comments are noteworthy when viewed in the context of President Obama's wireless connectivity goal. In the same month, the White House released documentation that said that President Obama had set a goal of connecting 99 percent of American students to high-speed broadband and wireless by the year 2019) Tim House is WIA's Executive Vice President. Before WIA, House worked in consumer product marketing at Discovery Communications.

== History ==
=== 1949 ===
WIA was founded in 1949. The focus of the group has shifted as technologies have advanced. At various times throughout WIA's history, it has focused on land mobile radio, paging, messaging, personal communications services, and tower and antenna siting.

=== 2012 ===
In 2012, WIA submitted an amicus curiae brief in the U.S. Supreme Court case Arlington v. FCC. WIA argued in support of the FCC in the case, arguing that local delays in approval of broadband projects are a national problem. The amicus curiae brief cited evidence that over 3,300 wireless service facility siting applications were pending before local jurisdictions throughout the country, and that around 180 of those applications had been pending for over three years.

In 2012, Congress passed and President Barack Obama signed the Middle Class Tax Relief and Job Creation Act. The law included a provision related to the wireless infrastructure industry. Specifically, section 6409(a) of the law orders states and local governments to approve requests made by companies to collocate (Note: Collocation is simply the act of placing something next to something else.) , remove or replace transmission equipment on existing wireless towers or base stations. The law included an exception: if the action substantially changes the physical dimensions of the tower or base station, then the law's protection doesn't apply. The provision and the authority it prescribed is described by the wireless industry as "collocation-by-right".

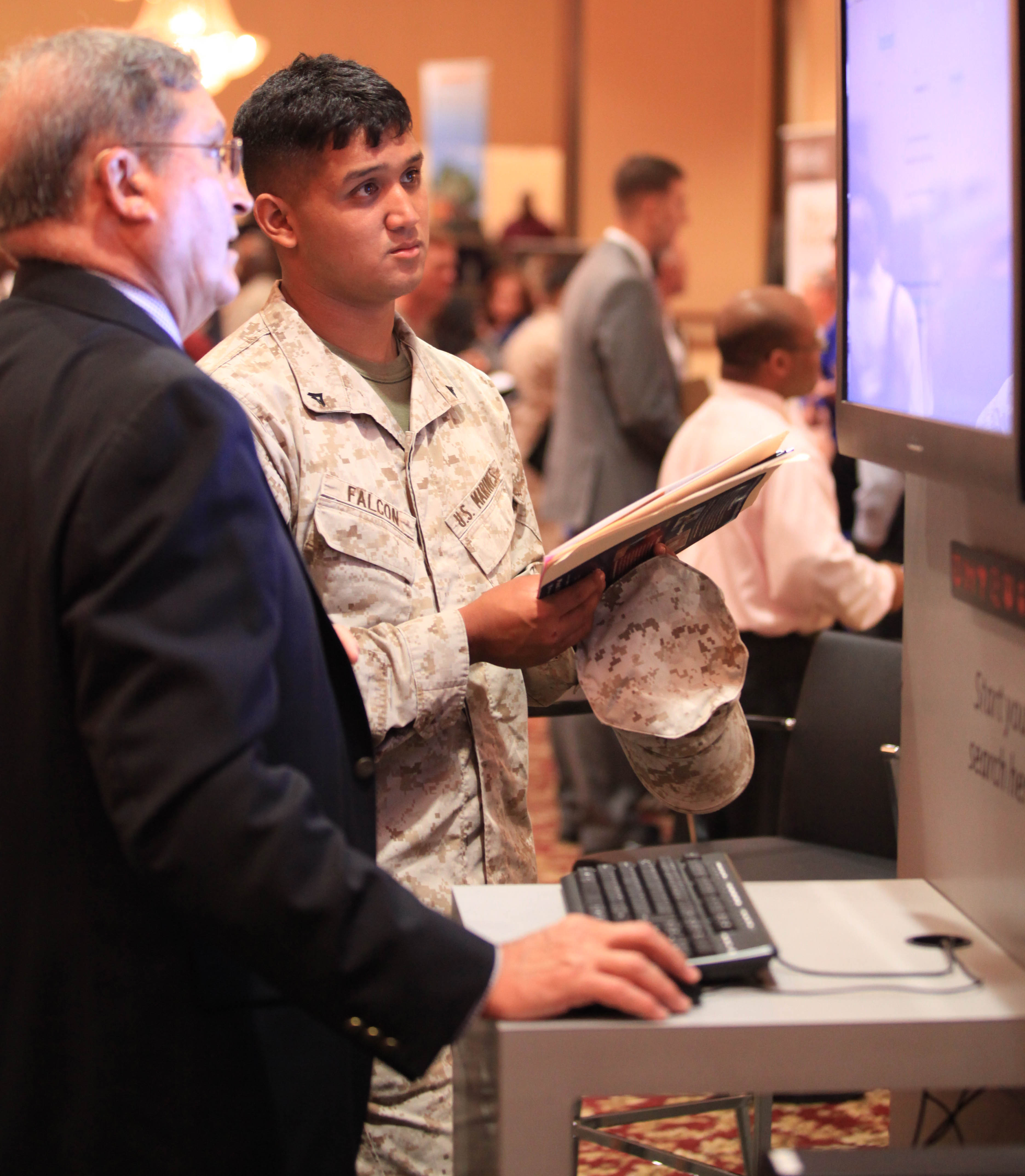
Warriors 4 Wireless (W4W) aims to train and find jobs for 5,000 military veterans in the wireless industry by 2015. WIA, DYNIS, Competitive Carriers Association, T-Mobile, MasTec, and PricewaterhouseCoopers are sponsors.

=== 2013 ===
In 2013, WIA submitted comments to the FCC that expressed support in speeding up broadband deployment. WIA helped Congress write legislation that funded broadband deployment. WIA had asked Congress to include infrastructure providers in the list of eligible recipients of federal broadband funding. WIA influenced members of the congressional committees that funded the $4.7 billion Broadband Technology Opportunities Program (BTOP) to make eligible wireless carriers, backhaul providers, and tower companies for funds.

In 2013, Cisco, American Tower, Dynis, and WIA created a program called Warriors 4 Wireless. The organization helps military veterans train and apply for jobs at wireless companies. The program's stated goal is to place 5,000 veterans in jobs by 2015. WIA has pledged money to the program.

=== 2020 ===
WIA advocated an effort passed by the FCC commonly referred to as The "5G Upgrade Order," which made key clarifications for wireless deployment.

The Order:

- Set a clear demarcation as to when the 60-day shot clock for local approval begins
- Clarified which new equipment qualifies for streamlined approval
- Ensured local governments cannot misuse concealment and aesthetic conditions to limit the ability to quickly upgrade concealed infrastructure.

=== 2021 ===
WIA has been the leading voice in lobbying Congress to include wireless for funding eligibility in its landmark infrastructure bill. The bipartisan-passed legislation will provide $65 billion for broadband deployment and access. This legislation will promote wireless infrastructure deployment, with a priority on unserved communities. WIA helped convince Congress and the Administration to provide agencies with the needed flexibility to allow all broadband technologies, including mobile and fixed wireless, the opportunity to compete for funding. The all of-the-above broadband strategy, as pursued by WIA, will help close the digital divide and win the race to 5G.

== Advocacy ==
One of the main issues facing the wireless infrastructure industry is related to federal vs. local oversight of wireless infrastructure activity.

=== Federal vs. local oversight ===
In a February 2014 article in National Law Review, Washington telecommunications attorneys Dave Thomas and Douglas A. Svor explained the issue and the battle played out between the wireless industry and local governments.

In their article, Thomas and Svor state that spectrum and infrastructure serve as the most important aspects of federal communications laws in terms of being good for the economy and American competitiveness. For decades, the FCC has worked to make sure that critical communications infrastructure can get built with as little hassle as possible.

In April 2014, the FCC proposed to simplify the regulatory review process for wireless facilities. These facilities include DAS and small cells (see Small cells and HetNet Forum below for more information).

Small cells are built smaller than traditional cells that are typically fixed to large wireless antenna towers. Infrastructure companies attach small cells to utility poles, street light poles, and even traffic lights. The wireless industry has supported the FCC's work in the areas mentioned above, while local governments have typically been opposed.

Thomas and Svor wrote:

Industry's universal support for the FCC's proposals has been matched by local government's hostility towards them. State and local governments view the measures as an unwarranted - and unconstitutional - federal incursion into state and local authority.

=== List of major public policy issues for industry ===
Definitions and details for major legislative and regulatory issues
Issue	Image	Definition	Details
Broadband deployment		Broadband deployment is the process of getting permission to build, and then building the infrastructure for broadband	The U.S. private sector spends $73 billion each year to build broadband. WIA wants the FCC to issue rulings known as "declaratory rulings". WIA asked the FCC to use declaratory rulings to reduce barriers that make it difficult for companies to build wireless infrastructure. For example, if a telecommunications company installs equipment on a structure or tower, WIA believes that other companies should be able to also install their equipment on that same structure or tower. WIA wants the FCC to declare that it would be discriminatory for a tower operator to not allow other companies to install their equipment on the structure or tower, in the example just mentioned.
FCC "shot clock" rules		The FCC shot clock rules governs the length of time that local and state governments must process applications for certain cell towers.	If two or more wireless providers share a cell tower, the state/local agencies must process the applications within 90 days. The agencies must process applications within 150 days for new cell towers.
Public safety		According to WIA, 70 percent of calls to 9-1-1 are made from wireless devices like cell phones and smart phones.	WIA frames its advocacy work related to broadband deployment and speed in terms of public safety by arguing that "both citizens and public safety officials need access to wireless services anywhere and at all times." The federal government, through its Broadband.gov website, says that investing in broadband will modernize public safety and homeland security communications. On the site, the government proposes a number of changes, including creating a nationwide public safety wireless communication network. For a more comprehensive list, see National Broadband Plan (United States). Further information on the role of wireless networks in public safety: Public safety network
Siting		Building a new wireless tower or putting an antenna on an existing tower or building is called "siting."	WIA has submitted briefings to various governmental bodies to make it easier for cell tower companies to build new towers. Construction of a new cell tower requires a number of approvals, including approval from state and local government authorities. On May 5, 2014, the U.S. Supreme Court announced that it will hear a case involving cell tower siting. The main issue in the case—T-Mobile South v. Roswell, Ga.—is whether a city that denies a siting permit must justify that denial. The case stemmed from the city of Rosell, Georgia, which had denied a tower license to T-Mobile. When Roswell denied the license, it did not give an explanation to T-Mobile. WIA expressed its support of the Supreme Court making a decision on the issue. Both WIA and the American Legislative Exchange Council (ALEC) have written suggested legislation for states to adopt to regulate tower siting. (Note: The PCIA model legislation can be found at Model State Wireless Telecommunications Facility Siting Legislation. The ALEC model bill can be found at Wireless Communications Tower Siting Act.)
Small cells		A small cell is a piece of equipment used for radio transmission that is typically low-powered. Wireless providers use small cells to improve the coverage of cell phones in small areas like buildings, homes, and neighborhoods.	For WIA and its members, the main federal government issue regarding small cells is environmental. When companies build small cells, the federal government requires a review process. The process reviews the historical and environmental impact of the building. The wireless infrastructure industry wants the government to exclude small cells from that review process. The industry believes that small cells, due to their size, typically do not pose any significant issues that would warrant an historical or environmental review. Main article: Small cell
Utility pole attachment		A utility pole is a pole, often made of wood or durable metals, that holds power lines and cables overhead. Around 134 million poles exist in the U.S. The federal government controls use of some poles, while states control use of others.	Entities that build and own the utility poles have had partnerships with companies that use utility poles. The partnership has existed since the early 1900s and is referred to as "joint use." The company that rents space on the pole is often referred to as the attacher. Section 224 of the Communications Act allows telecommunications companies to use utility poles. The law requires utility pole owners (usually utility companies) to charge reasonable rates for access to the poles. Section 703 of the 1996 Communications Act extended use of utility poles, and the provisions for reasonable rates, to wireless providers. WIA wants wireless infrastructure developers to be able to use (have access to) utility poles. The industry believes that because the poles already exist, infrastructure developers should use the poles when building new networks. The industry wants the FCC to make sure that regulations make it easier and more cost-effective for wireless infrastructure developers to use utility poles. See also: Utility pole

== HetNet Forum ==
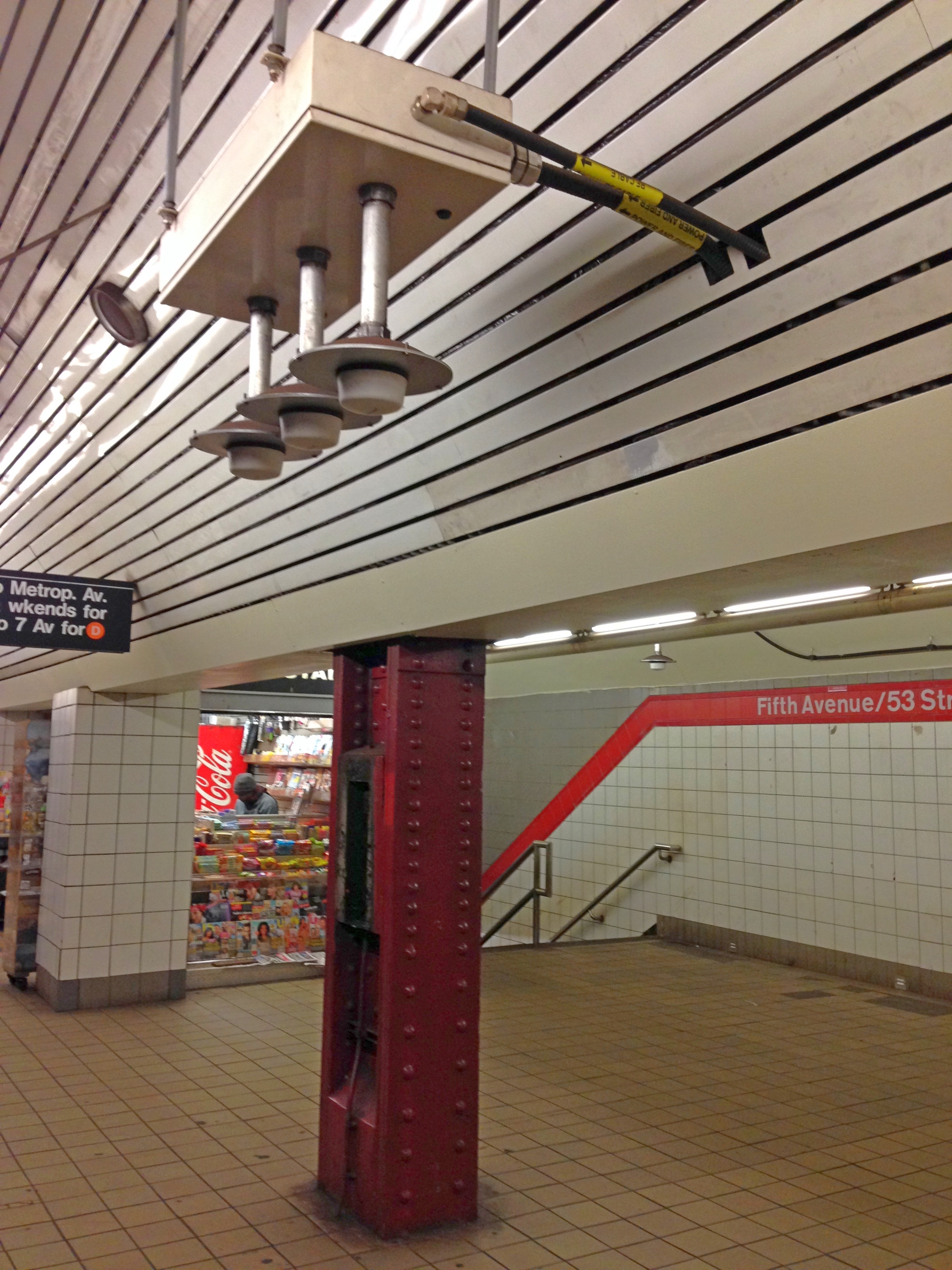
The DAS (pictured here) deployed in the New York City subway provides WiFi, cellular voice and data coverage.

HetNets, short for "Heterogeneous Networks", are a combination of technologies that make quality wireless broadband possible. According to international communications company Ericsson, heterogeneous networks help wireless customers enjoy activities that require a large amount of data, such as watching streaming videos, uploading photos and using cloud storage services. HetNets use both radio and cellular technologies.

To advocate for deployment of HetNet, WIA runs a membership forum called the HetNet Forum. The purpose of the forum is to advance the development of heterogeneous networks in the United States, as well as to push policies related to distributed antenna systems (DAS), (Note: A distributed antenna system, referred to as a DAS, is a network of small antennas installed throughout a building. The antennas serve as repeaters for wireless signals. A DAS is often used to improve poor wireless coverage inside large buildings.) small cells, and fiber backhaul. (Note: Backhauling is the practice of sending data over a network in an "out of the way route" in order to get the data to its destination quicker or more cheaply. Backhauling can also refer to the practice of getting data to a point from which it can then be distributed to its intended targets. This latter definition often applies to satellite TV systems.) Several major U.S. wireless carriers, such as AT&T, T-Mobile and Verizon Wireless, serve as governing members of the forum.

Prior to April 2013, the HetNet Forum had been called the DAS Forum. WIA changed the name to accommodate a growing membership that represented a more diverse group of technologies. Instead of running a forum focusing only on DAS, WIA expanded the forum to focus on several technologies such as microcells, picocells, Wi-Fi and remote radio units, in addition to DAS.

Other trade associations, such as the Small Cell Forum, have competed with WIA for members from the small cell industry.

== Criticism ==
In 2014, Senator Al Franken criticized the "revolving door" hiring placement of former FCC commissioners. Specifically, Franken criticized the hiring of FCC Commissioner Meredith Baker by Comcast. Franken did not mention WIA in his remarks, but an OpenSecrets.org article covering the remarks mentioned the hiring of former Commissioner Jonathan Adelstein by WIA.

=== Dictionaries and encyclopedias ===
- "Wireless Telegraphy and Telephony" . Collier's New Encyclopedia. 1921.
- Tower and Antenna Siting at FCC Encyclopedia
- Broadband Acceleration at FCC Encyclopedia
- Broadband and Internet in the Consumer Publications Library at the U.S. Federal Communications Commission (FCC)

=== Government documents ===
- Wireless Telecommunications Bureau at the Federal Communications Commission (FCC)* Understanding Wireless Communications in Public Safety at FCC
- 16th Mobile Wireless Competition Report at FCC
- National Broadband Map, a tool published by the FCC, allows citizens to enter any address to view wired and wireless broadband services available.
- Public Safety Wireless Technology Links at the National Institute of Standards and Technology (NIST)

=== Literature ===
- Nets, Webs and the Information Infrastructure at Wikibooks

=== News ===
- Wireless communications selected news and commentary at The New York Times
- Wireless infrastructure selected news and commentary at Fierce Wireless
- Wireless carriers collected news and videos at Fox Business

=== Technical guides ===
- This HetNet visual aide by Ericsson shows how various components, such as Wi-Fi, base stations, and wireless transmitters work together to form a Heterogeneous Network (HetNet).
- Pole Attachments at National Association of Regulatory Utility Commissioners (NARUC)

=== Video ===
- Jonathan Adelstein Appearances on C-SPAN
- PCIA Wireless Infrastructure Show 2014 Opening Remarks on YouTube
- Announcing the National Broadband Plan video by Julius Genachowski, Chairman of the U.S. Federal Communications Commission, at broadband.gov

=== WIA website links ===
- Official website
- Connectivity Expo
- 2014 Wireless Infrastructure Show
- Wireless Broadband Infrastructure: A Catalyst for GDP and Job Growth 2013-2017 report published by WIA (September 2013)

== Gallery ==
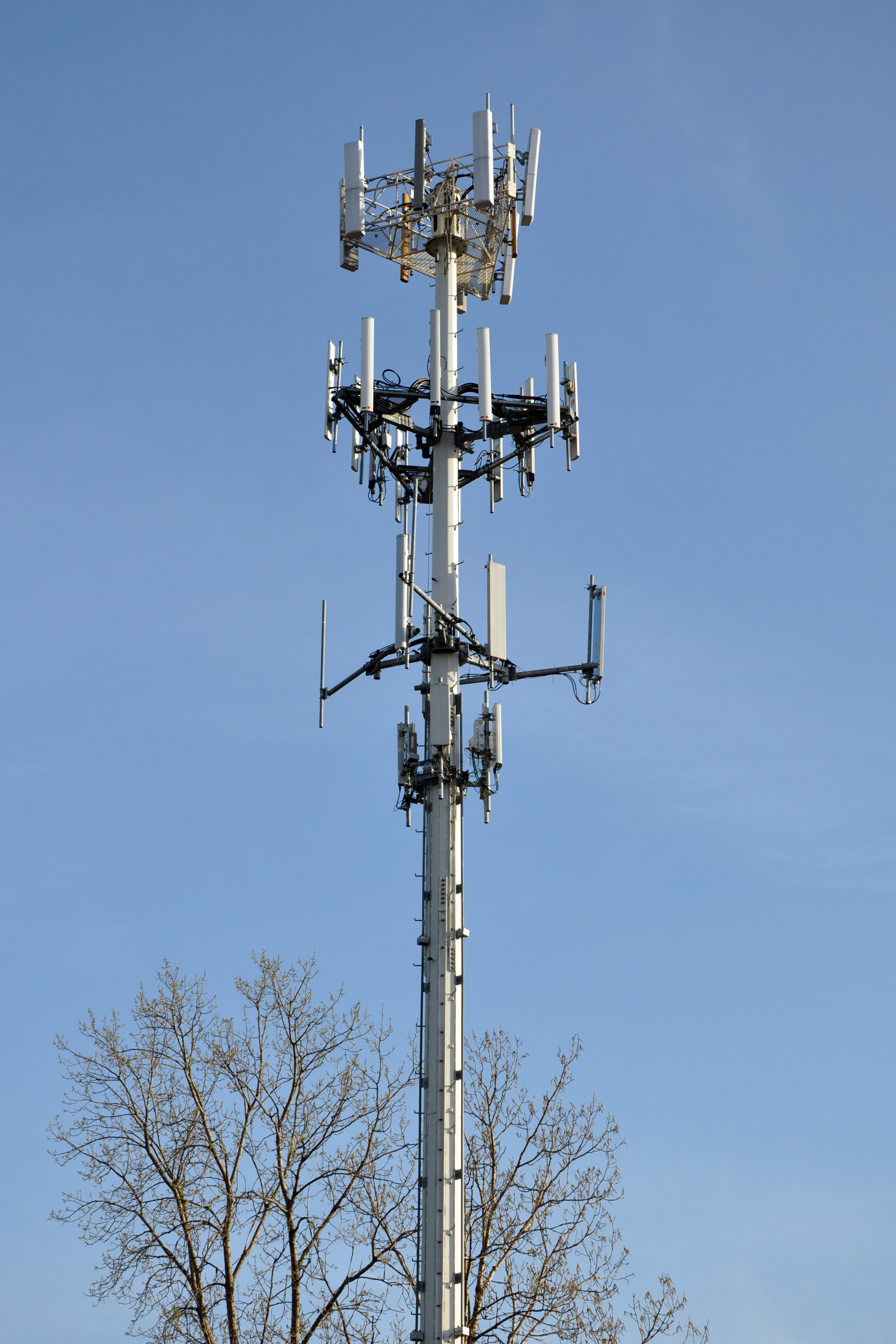
Cell phone tower in Palatine, Illinois, USA.

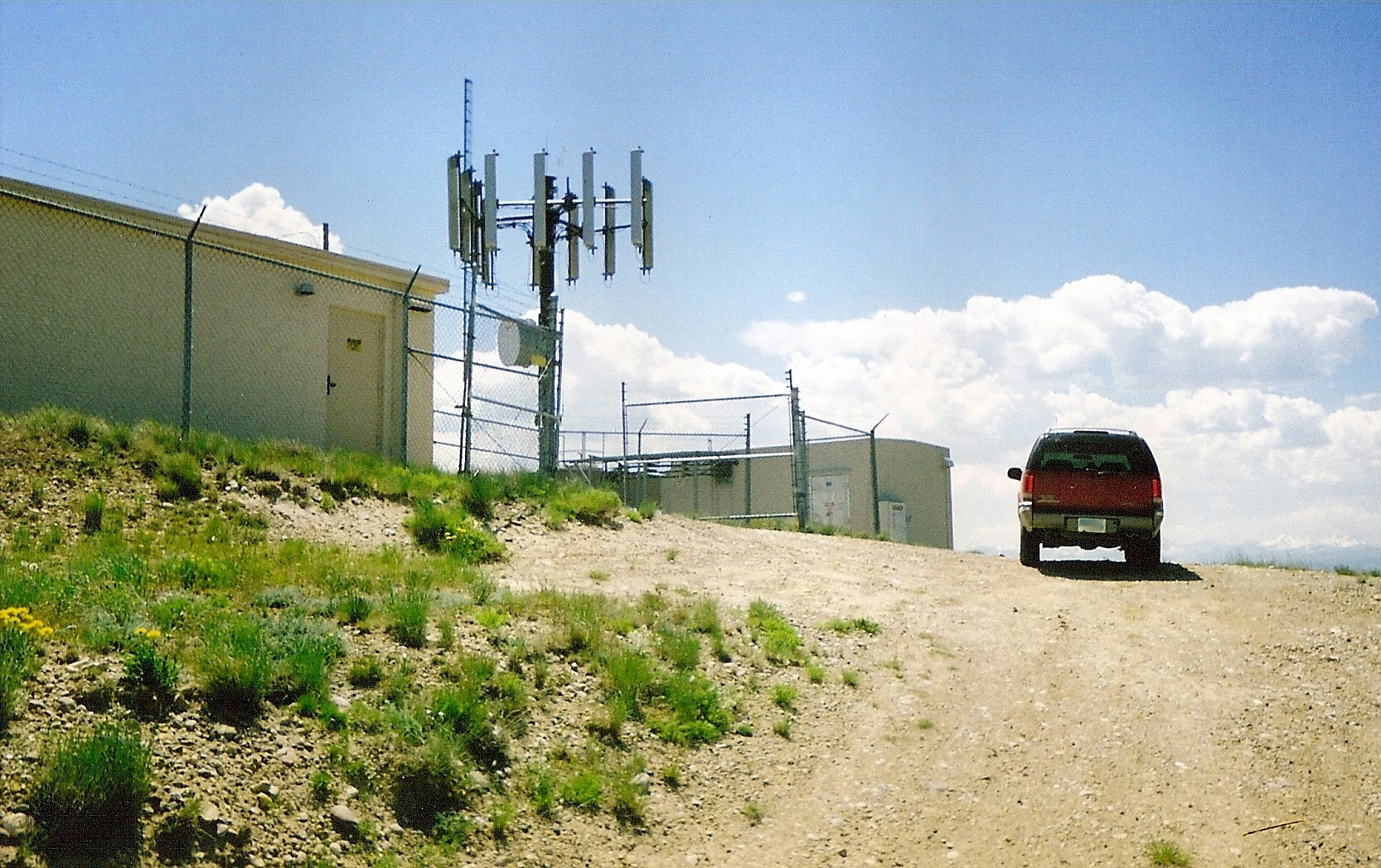
A short-mast cell site on top of a mountain in Wyoming, USA

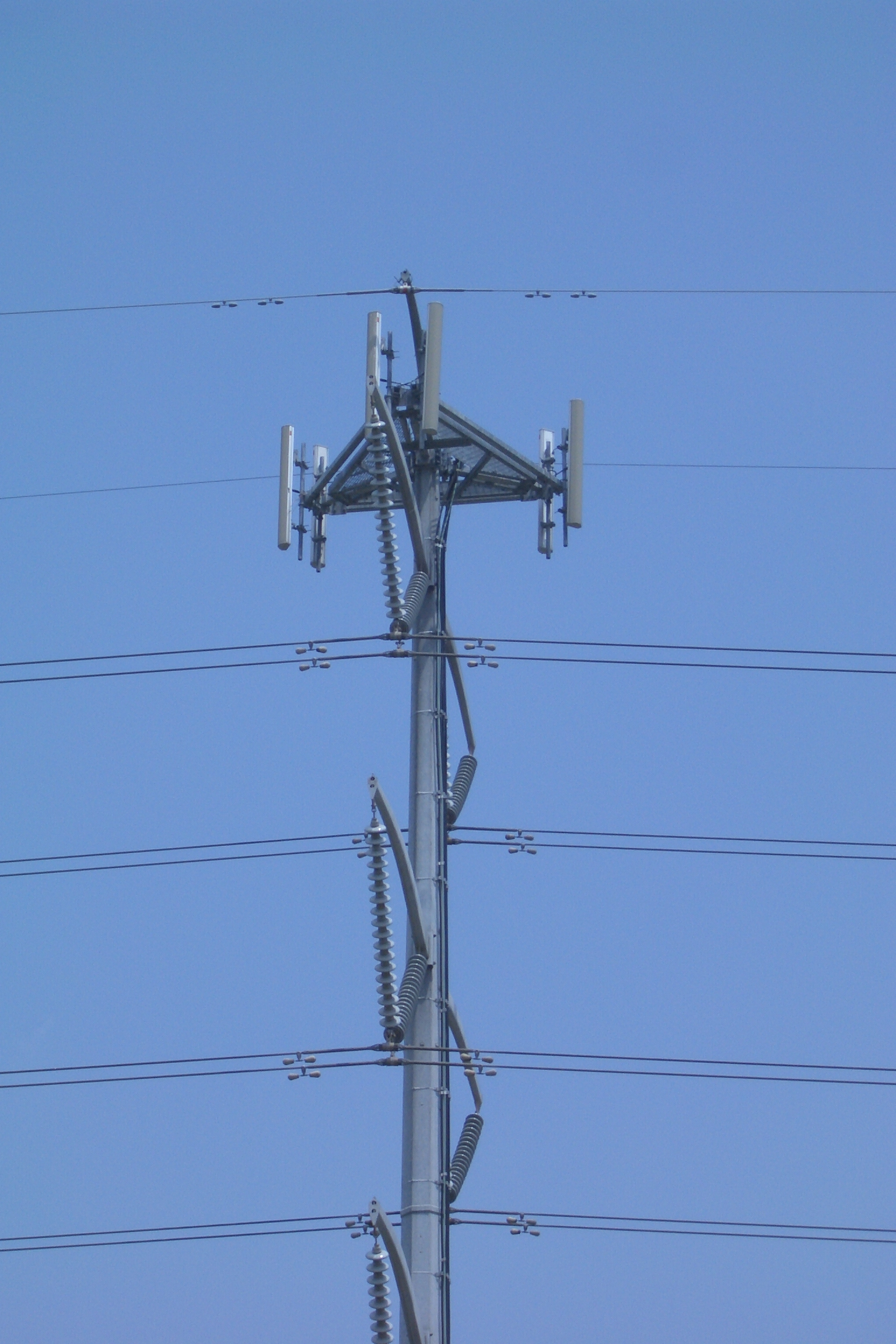
An antenna array on top of an electricity pylon

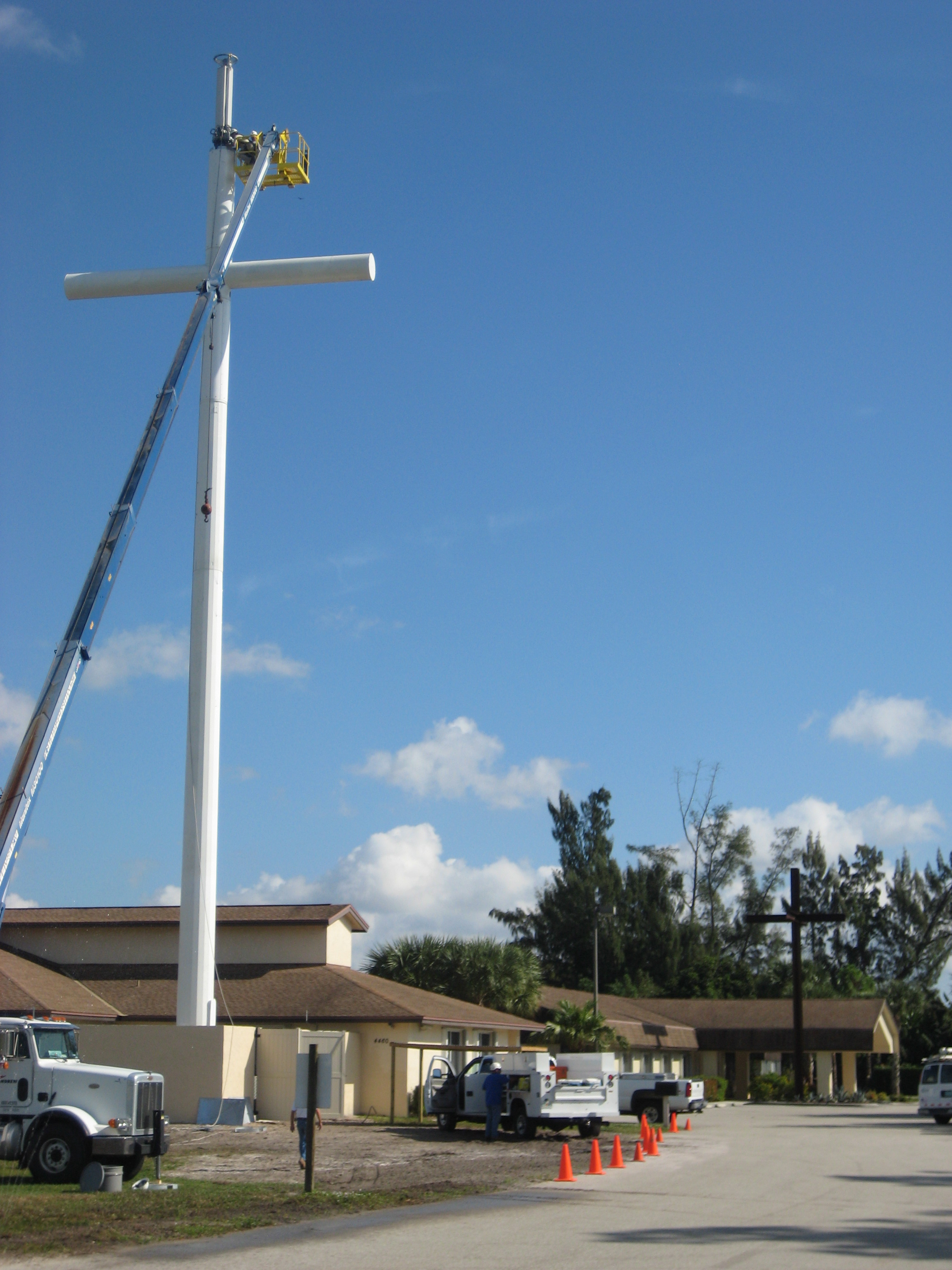
This 100 feet tall cross at Epiphany Lutheran Church, in Lake Worth, Florida, conceals equipment for T-Mobile.

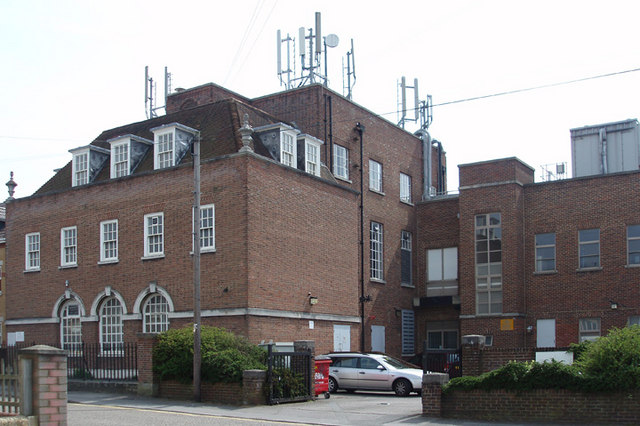
A cell site placed atop an existing building

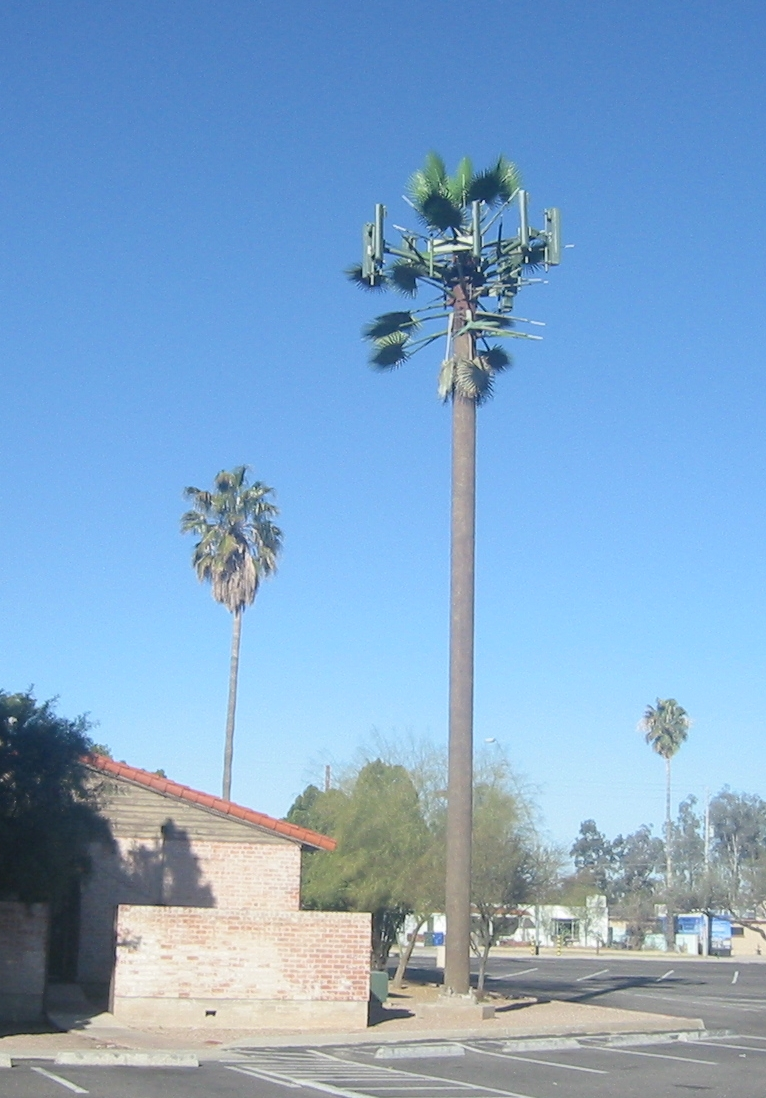
Camouflaged monopole, called "monopalm", in Tucson, Arizona

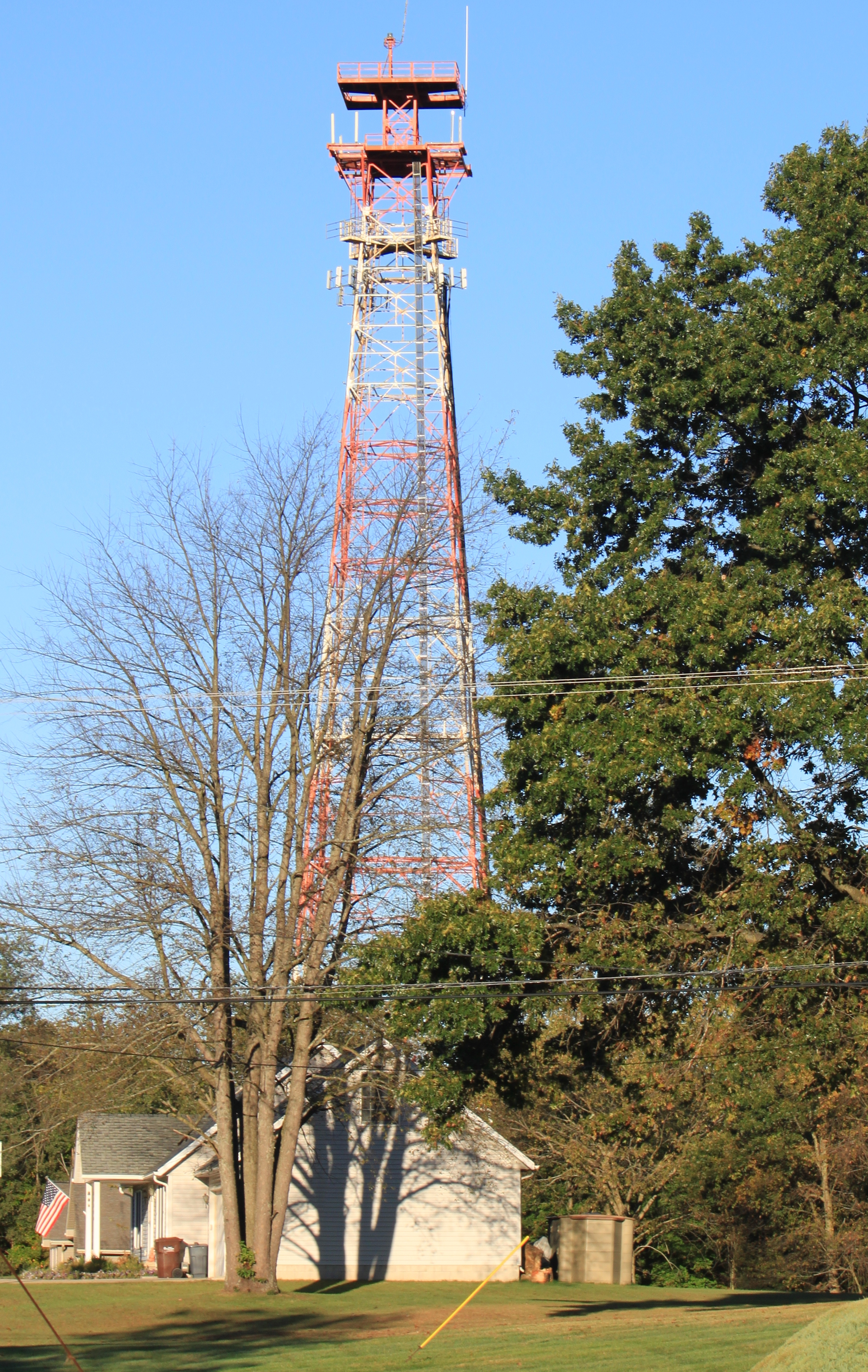
American Tower wireless tower, Belleville, MI

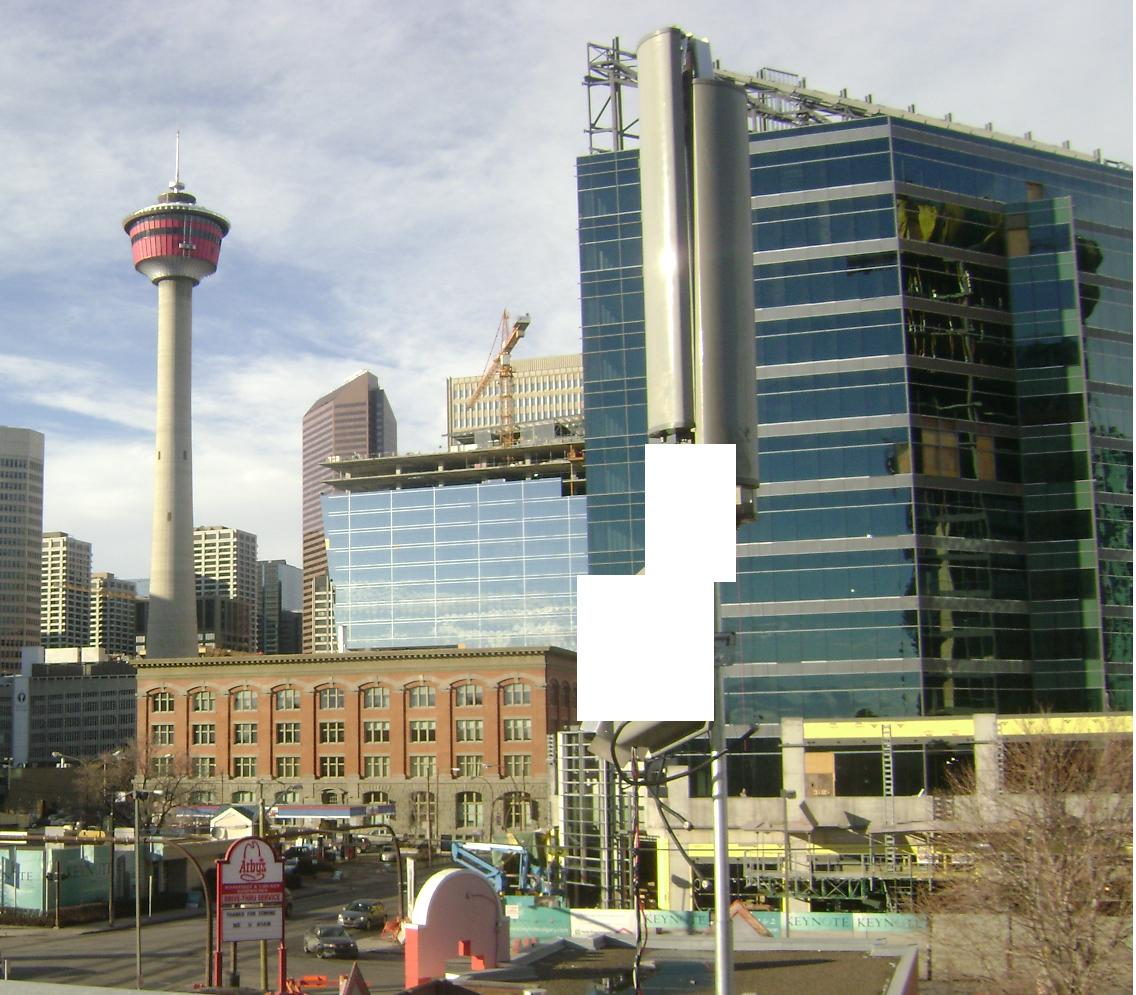
A WestNet Wireless Cell site being erected

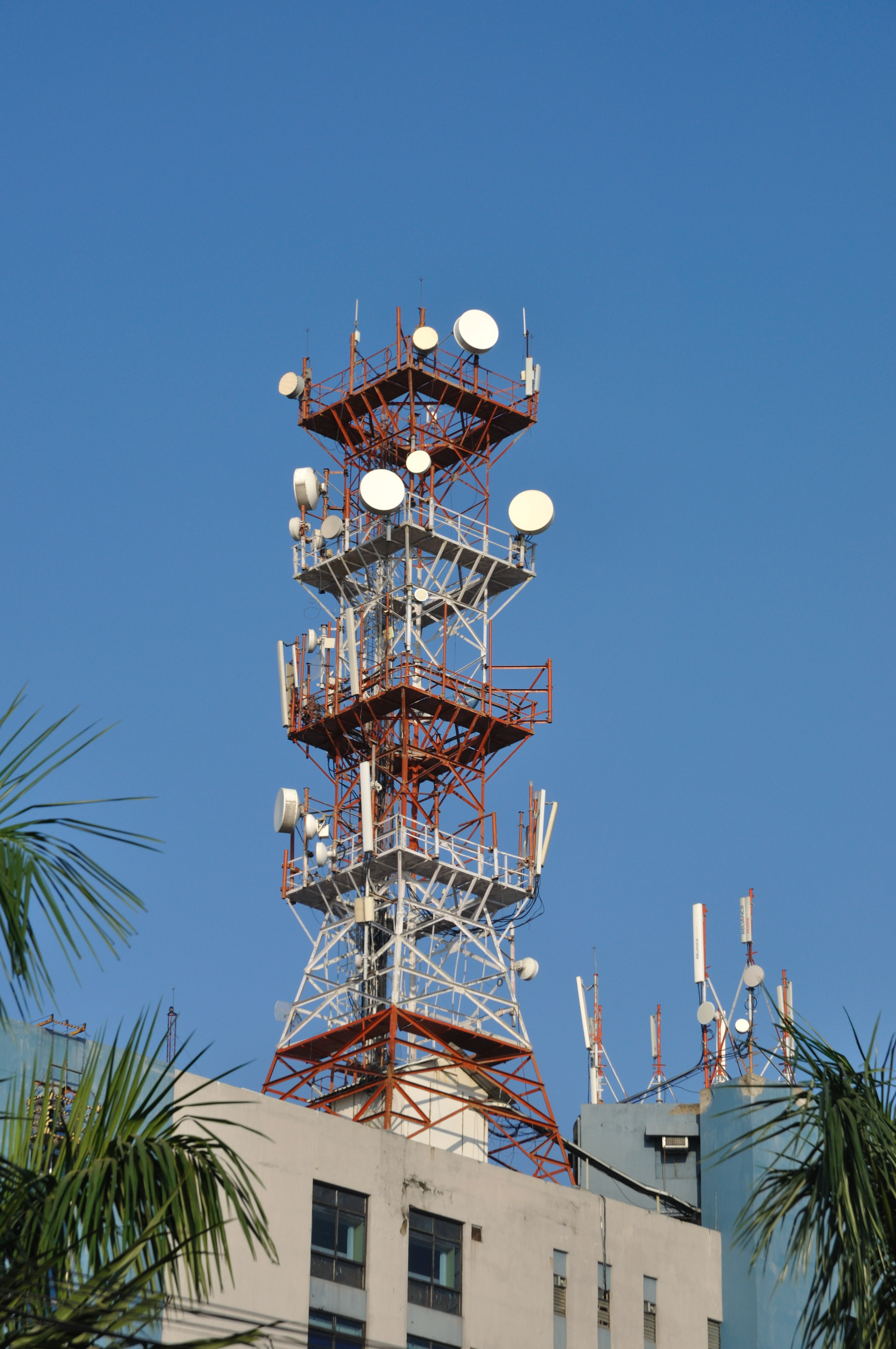
An overseas cell site

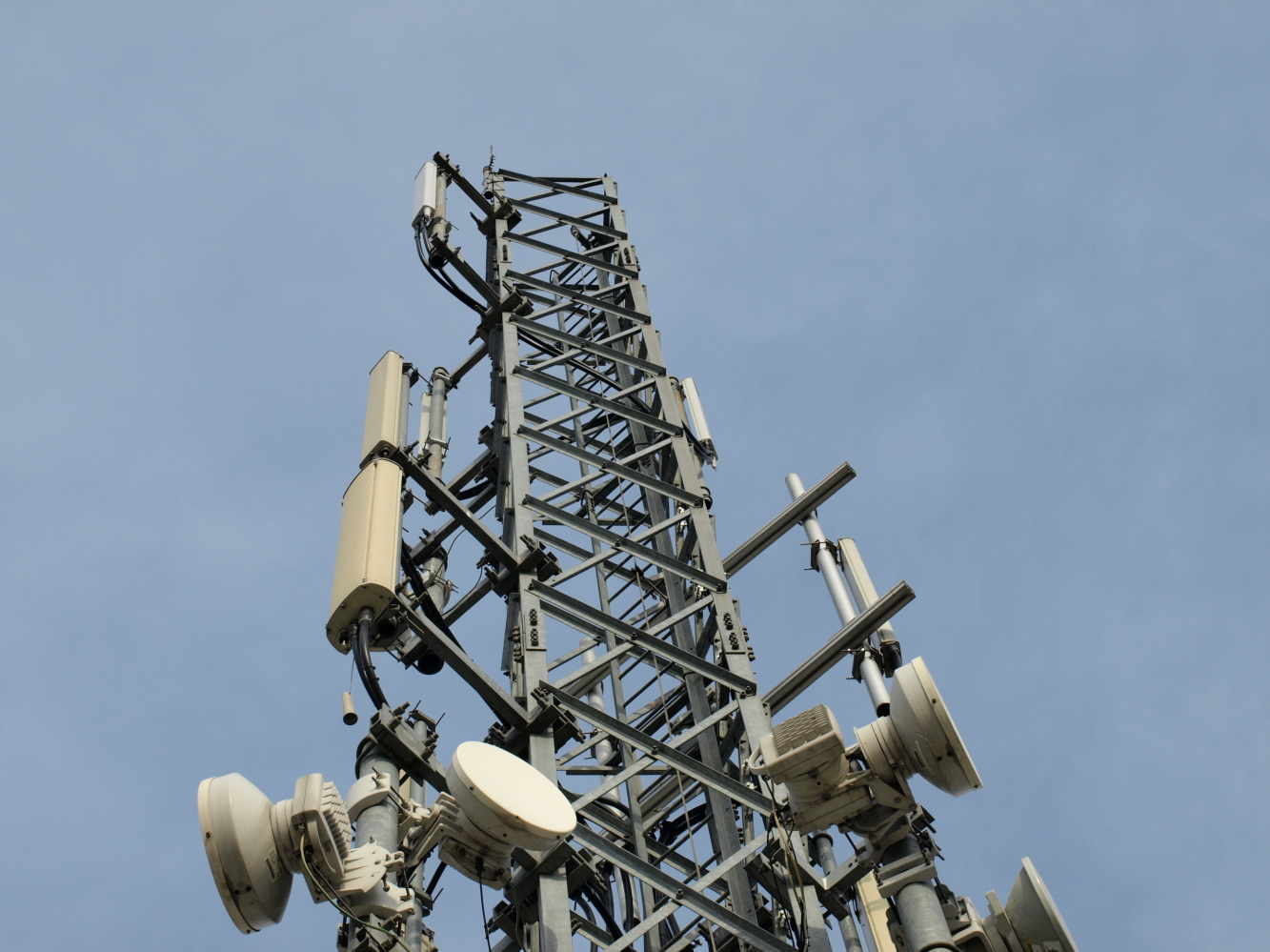
A base transceiver station (BTS) is a piece of equipment that facilitates wireless communication between user equipment (UE) and a network

== See also ==
- National Telecommunications and Information Administration
- Federal Communications Act
- Federal Communications Commission (FCC)
- First Responder Network Authority (FirstNet)
- HetNet
- Policies promoting wireless broadband in the United States
