= Broadband mapping in the United States =

Broadband maps indicate service availability over geographic space. This historical map of California counties in 2011 suggests there is greater availability in large urban metro areas such as Los Angeles and San Francisco.

Broadband mapping in the United States are efforts to describe geographically how Internet access service from telephone and cable TV companies (commonly called "broadband") is available in terms of available speed and price. Mapping has been done on the national as well as the state level. The efforts are seen as preliminary steps towards broadband universal service.

== Background ==
Internet access and bit rates (often called "speeds") vary considerably across the US. Generally, rural Internet users have fewer options and slower service. American consumers often spend more money for slower service than in other countries.

Former Federal Communications Commission (FCC) and California Public Utilities Commission commissioner Rachelle Chong floated the idea of broadband mapping while working for the Governor Arnold Schwarzenegger Administration in California in 2006. The California Broadband Task Force had performed the first voluntary broadband mapping exercise in that state in 2006–2007, having learned about it when Commissioner Chong visited the ConnectKentucky broadband project in 2005. The broadband maps were then used by the CPUC to determine both "unserved areas" (defined as an area that is not served by any form of facilities-based broadband, or where Internet connectivity is available only through dial-up service or satellite) and "underserved" areas (defined as an area in which broadband is available but no facilities-based provider offers service at speeds of at least 3 megabits per second (Mb/s) download and 1 Mbit/s upload). A $100 million program called the California Advanced Services Fund (CASF) was established on December 20, 2007, under the leadership of Assigned Commissioner Chong at the CPUC to bring an "onramp to the Internet" to unserved areas and underserved areas of the state, with unserved areas having first priority using filing windows. In 2008, State Senator Alex Padilla (D-Pacoima) codified the CASF program with Senate Bill (SB) 1193, signed by Governor Schwarzenegger on September 29, 2008, to ensure it had the legislative authority it needed to operate. On September 25, 2010, Governor Schwarzenegger signed SB1040 which added CASF funds of $125 million, of which $100 million went to broadband infrastructure funding, and $25 million to broadband adoption programs.

In 2008, the FCC approved a broadband mapping plan which would examine availability by speed and "provide a more granular look at where broadband is available," according to a report in The Washington Post. The Broadband Data Improvement Act was introduced by Senator Daniel Inouye in 2007 and became law on October 10, 2008. The act's section 106 created a legal framework for the United States Department of Commerce's State Broadband Data and Development Grant Program, but did not fund it.

The Broadband Technology Opportunities Program (BTOP) was funded as part of the American Recovery and Reinvestment Act of 2009 (known as the "stimulus package") under the Obama administration. Funds were allocated by the Commerce Department and the National Telecommunications and Information Administration (NTIA) in February 2009.

On April 2, 2009, California's Commissioner Chong testified before the House Subcommittee on Communications, Technology and the Internet, about the California broadband program, and recommended that every state be required to perform broadband mapping in order to have an accurate understanding of its unserved and underserved areas, and not waste American Recovery and Reinvestment Act federal funding for broadband expansion. She further recommended that the broadband data be collected at the granular street address level annually in order to get the most accurate data. She testified that broadband mapping funds should be fairly allocated among the states, with an eye towards population, density, area, broadband penetration, and state's commitment to broadband.

The NTIA was to create and release a National Broadband Inventory Map by February 17, 2011.

In 2009, it was estimated that US$350 million would be expended to build the nationwide inventory of broadband services map. The mapping project was part of a much larger project perhaps involving seven billion dollars for a National Broadband Plan that had, among other goals, bringing high speed Internet service to rural areas. State governments such as New Hampshire, North Carolina, and Minnesota attempted broadband maps, as did nations in Africa.

In Massachusetts, an ARRA grant was supplemented with state funds in 2010 for the Massachusetts Broadband Institute. In service of the MassBroadband 123 project to provide universal access statewide, the Institute created the Massachusetts Broadband Map, as of 2011 updated every six months.

In 2023, the National Telecommunications and Information Administration reported that more than 8.3 million location‑level broadband availability claims were formally challenged during the BEAD program’s verification process, underscoring ongoing concerns about the accuracy of provider‑reported coverage data.

== Lack of mapping standards ==
As with other thematic maps, there is no standard for mapping information. Rather, different studies have been done using different geographic and data rate parameters. Geometric units such as census tracts as well as zip codes have been used. Although the term broadband once had a technical meaning, it is used in marketing and policy to generally apply to relatively high data rate (and thus more expensive) Internet access, while technology changes over time. One 2007 estimate used five speed ranges, with the lowest being from 200 kbit/s to 768 kbit/s, and the highest was more than 6 Mbit/s.

== Politics and controversy ==
Politics influences the allocation of funds. The National Telecommunications and Information Administration in 2009 said it would reassess the program to ensure the funds are used in a "fiscally prudent" manner, after private firms claimed they could make the map for much less. In addition, there is an effort by the FCC to do a separate mapping effort unconnected to the congressional effort.

Internet providers, including telephone and cable firms, according to a report in The New York Times, are reluctant to disclose to government whether it offers service to some regions, how much it costs, and other parameters of availability. Lobbying firms and nonprofits geared up to battle for funding since there could be lucrative government contracts in the future.

Connected Nation is a non-profit group which was involved in an effort to get the state of Kentucky mapped regarding its available Internet service. It is funded by AT&T, Verizon, and other telecom firms. Art Brodsky, Communications Director at Public Knowledge, a public interest organization which focuses on telecoms, wrote several articles in the Huffington Post criticizing the efforts of Connected Nation which, in his view, represented the interests of the telephone and cable industries and not the interests of consumers or other Internet-using publics. According to Brodsky, the nonprofit has board members who work for leading telecom and cable firms, and the nonprofit is heading efforts to keep the broadband map information "confidential" by deeming it "proprietary". Brodsky used the term broadband bullies to describe telephone and cable efforts to impede the mapping project.

Behavioral economics expert Sara Wedeman—who has studied broadband mapping methodologies—criticized the politics behind the mapping efforts and suggested that efforts by cable and telephone companies could undermine choices for consumers. Wedeman lauded the methodologies by states such as North Carolina and Massachusetts and noted that when studies were done properly, the reports found that broadband speed and availability were below those reported by similar efforts by affiliates of Connected Nations.

== See also ==
- Internet access
- List of countries by number of broadband Internet subscriptions
