= Broadband Equity, Access, and Deployment Program =

American government broadband program

The Broadband Equity, Access, and Deployment Program, commonly known by its acronym BEAD, is an American government initiative to achieve broadband universal service across the United States. The initiative mandates the use of taxpayer funds to finance the construction of broadband infrastructure in currently unserved or underserved locations, and it was enacted as part of the Infrastructure Investment and Jobs Act of 2021. The program ultimately seeks to make affordable and reliable broadband service available to all American businesses and residences by 2030.

== Background and requirements ==
The Infrastructure Investment and Jobs Act allocated $65 billion toward various telecommunications and broadband initiatives across the United States. Within that allocation, the statute dedicated $42.45 billion specifically for a grant program to be managed by the National Telecommunications and Information Administration (NTIA), called the Broadband Equity, Access, and Deployment (BEAD) Program. The highest priority was given to communities with Internet speeds below 25 mbps downstream and 3 mbps upstream. This requirement was later upgraded to 100/20 mbps.

Also included in the IIJA was funding for the NTIA's Tribal Broadband Connectivity Program, support for a new middle mile infrastructure development program, and funding for state and federal digital equity plans on behalf of underserved demographic groups. All of these funds can be requested by communities and organizations via a grant proposal process. The statute also provided funds to the U.S, Department of Agriculture to deliver broadband to rural communities of fewer than 20,000 people, with a portion of that obligated to utility cooperatives.

An early version of the IIJA statute included a tacit statement of support for municipal broadband networks to be operated by cities, with funds possibly being allocated directly to local communities, but this was removed from the final legislation due to telecommunications industry pressure. The final statute allocated each American state and territory a portion of the $42.45 billion based on population size and extent of underserved areas. The states were instructed, via their utilities commissions or broadband-specific authorities (if any), to disburse the funds in the form of grants to local governments, telecommunications firms, or community organizations.

== Implementation history ==
After several years of reviewing grant proposals, the National Telecommunications and Information Administration began disbursing funds to states in 2024. The process rolled out very slowly as the NTIA developed internal processes to handle an unexpectedly large number of grant requests. There was also disagreement over how to define communities as "underserved" and thus eligible for priority disbursements.

The availability of BEAD funds changed significantly when the second administration of Donald Trump took office in early 2025, as federal government attitudes on the use of taxpayer funding for public infrastructure projects changed. More specifically the Biden Administration, which sponsored the IIJA, favored fiber backbone networks as the most cost-effective infrastructure for reaching underserved locations, but the Trump Administration instead favored a vaguely-defined “technological neutrality” strategy in which other infrastructural options like satellite networks should be considered for any community seeking a BEAD grant. This raised suspicions of favoritism toward Starlink satellite constellations as the solution for gaps in American broadband coverage, which in turn would be a financial benefit for Trump's then-ally and campaign contributor Elon Musk.

The new focus on satellite Internet service as a solution for any community requesting a BEAD grant necessitated additional technical and financial information during the grant proposal and request process, thus slowing down disbursements significantly; while experts contended that satellite networks are not a viable solution for widespread gaps in broadband coverage due to limited system capacity, the need for thousands of satellites, and the dependency on rocket launches for deployment. By mid-2025, the BEAD grant disbursal process became even more uncertain when Trump and Musk had a falling out, with satellites once again receiving less priority during the grant proposal process. Trump also threatened to restrict the NTIA from disbursing BEAD funds to states with certain types of artificial intelligence regulations, while objecting to the digital equity programs promoted in the IIJA statute as part of his disagreement with diversity, equity, and inclusion (DEI) initiatives. The updated BEAD requirements also block states from receiving funds if they do not exempt ISPs from any state-level net neutrality laws anywhere in the state, targeting states like California with such laws.

The disbursement of BEAD funds was further complicated by a plethora of state regulations, as at least 16 states have statutes that prohibit the use of federal funds to expand utility and telecommunications networks for various reasons, and/or prohibit local communities from building networks without state approval, all of which conflict with the IIJA requirement for the NTIA to receive and process grant requests from local communities. As a result, legal discrepancies between NTIA processes and state requirements had to be resolved in several state legislatures before any communities in those states would become eligible for BEAD grants, with broadband policy experts becoming concerned that this would lead to years-long legal disputes. The NTIA also asked several states to waive their regulations that prohibit a community from receiving BEAD grants, which was only partially successful.

In 2025, Secretary of Commerce Howard Lutnick, whose department oversees the NTIA, promised an accelerated schedule of BEAD grant disbursements. However, the process was further delayed as the NTIA formulated more internal policies for monitoring how communities use the grants after approval, and whether contracted telecommunications infrastructure companies are building the networks per statutory requirements. By 2026, about half of the $42.45 billion allocated by Congress during the passage of the IIJA remained unused, leading to discussions among broadband experts and policymakers about using those funds for related purposes such as discounted home computers or upgrading government computing systems. State policymakers also proposed various alterations to the grant approval process to eliminate burdensome application requirements, while some members of Congress pressed the Trump Administration to explain the delays.
