= Policies promoting wireless broadband in the United States =

Policies promoting wireless broadband are policies, rules, and regulations supporting the "National Wireless Initiative", a plan to bring wireless broadband Internet access to 98% of Americans.

Spectrum is limited and much of it already in use. This raises the issue of space and strength of supporting the network. The infrastructure has to reach across the entire United States in areas that normally do not have Internet access. The main concept is to bring wireless service to residents in areas that may otherwise not have access to it. The public's interest in this plan is important as the people are the ones who will utilize this service. Network neutrality raises issues on freedom of information and who will have control over how the information is released, or even lack of control.

The Memorandum on Unleashing the Wireless Broadband Revolution claimed that wireless Internet access had the potential to enhance economic competition and improve the quality of life. The Internet is considered an important part of the economy and advanced business opportunities as it is a vital infrastructure. The Code of Federal Regulations says that this is the beginning of the next transformation in information technology, as we encounter the wireless broadband revolution.

== Strategy ==
The initial plan by President George W. Bush was to have broadband availability for all Americans by 2007. In February, 2011, President Obama announced details of the "National Wireless Initiative" or "Wireless Innovation and Infrastructure Initiative".

Federal Communications Commission (FCC) Chairperson Michael K. Powell created the Wireless Broadband Access Task Force to help bring the plan together. The members study existing wireless broadband policies, making recommendations in the FCC's policies for acceleration in the deployment of the wireless technologies and services. This is completed by seeking out the expertise, experience, and advice of consumers, state and local governments, the industry, and other stakeholders. These recommendations are intended to assist with how to make policies and further progress the process for the national wireless plan. They are based on the inquiry of the state of wireless broadband as well as the FCC's policies that impact these services.

Powell commented in a statement that this broadband plan is a catalyst for positive change, bringing resources and jobs to communities across the country. The CTIA The Wireless Association encouraged legislative action that recognizes the unique and invaluable role of Wireless in providing Americans Internet access.

This plan included issues such as:

- Radio spectrum
- How the radio spectrum will support national wireless broadband
- Cost of creating the wireless network
- Maintaining the network
- Who will create the network and infrastructure
- Who will support the network and infrastructure
- Consideration of what the public interest is in this plan,
- The wireless plan's policies,
- What the current President of the United States plans to do
- How the previous President George W. Bush promoted this plan.

== Spectrum ==
=== Freeing space ===
The plan is to free up enough of the radio spectrum from licensed and unlicensed space. To free up space, the FCC intends to hold incentive auctions, spurring innovation, by current licensees voluntarily giving up their spectrum space. The CTIA has requested the FCC to obtain more capacity on the spectrum by placing priority on additional spectrum through the national wireless plan. This hopes to ensure space on the spectrum for the wireless broadband to work. The auction would also require legislation to conduct for the spectrum to be reassigned and reallocated. In this plan, legislation is needed for the FCC to hold these auctions to enable the current spectrum holders to realize a portion of the revenues if they participate. These voluntary incentive auctions for licensees are a critical part of freeing the spectrum, as well as encouraging the government to more efficiently use the spectrum. The auction is intended to bring profit back to the United States and new licensees. However, it was brought up in February 2011 that it is not clear on whether these incentive auctions will take place. One goal of the plan is to reduce the national deficit by approximately $10 billion through these license auctions and other business opportunities. The auctions and increased spectrum efficiency from the government would raise $27.8 billion over the next ten years. The government will be expected to use the spectrum more efficiently using new financial-compensation tools with commitments to using advanced technologies. There is also the idea to spur innovation by using $3 billion of the spectrum proceeds for research and development of newer wireless technologies and applications.

=== Spectrum sections to use ===
Wireless requires bandwidth, and because of this, there would need to be enough of the spectrum obtained to sustain the bandwidth of the network. It also needs to be considered that upload links and downstream communication can require a difference amount of space. In the FCC News in 2005, it is mentioned that there needs to be enough spectrum to account for the unbalancing of broadband services. The service typically needs a larger amount of bandwidth for downstream than for upload links. Wireless will only work with adequate spectrum to support the initiative and the many devices, networks, and applications that it will run. President Obama has set a goal of freeing 500 MHz of the spectrum for any wireless device within a decade. The CTIA also supports this within the next ten years. The space would also need to be within the stronger part of the spectrum. According to the 112th United States Congress, the Public Safety Spectrum and Wireless Innovation Act calls for this to be within the 700 MHz D block spectrum for rural and urban areas and was originally requested to be done before the Digital TV transition. The 700 MHz D block refers to the portion of the spectrum between the following frequencies

- 758 MHz to 763 MHz
- 788 MHz to 793 MHz.

In its pursuit to support the FCC, the CTIA also recommended the spectrum in the following ranges

- 1.7 GHz
- 2.1 GHz bands.

With 4G deployment rising, it is critical to have the airwave space to support future innovation and to avoid the spectrum crunch. This provides clearance in the spectrum that is already allocated to wireless carriers. The CTIA also have requested access to existing utility poles where new construction is not possible. Although the spectrum is wide, the science and physics of the spectrum still create limited amounts of space.

=== Reserved spectrum ===
President Obama also plans to increase public safety by reallocating the D block of the spectrum and $500 million within the Wireless Innovation (WIN) Fund. The 700 MHz D block spectrum would be reallocated and integrated for public safety entities. The Communications Act of 1934 would be amended to increase the electromagnetic spectrum by 10 MHz for public safety. An important part of this spectrum plan is that there is already space for public safety. One piece that needs to be determined is how to integrate the 700 MHz D block that will be reallocated with the existing public safety spectrum. The current 20 MHz of public safety spectrum needs to be determined how to be licensed as well. The considerations are nationwide, regional, statewide or some combination in accordance with the public interest.

=== Review of the spectrum use ===
In Section 205 of the Public Safety Spectrum and Wireless Innovation Act of the 112th United States Congress, it is required to have a review of the use of the spectrum after a certain period of time of the deployment. After no more than 5 years of the implementation of the wireless network plan, the Commission must conduct a survey and submit a report regarding the public safety spectrum. This includes how the spectrum is being used, recommendations on whether more spectrum is needed and determine if there is opportunity for some of the spectrum to be returned for other commercial purposes. The report intends to make sure that there is the right amount of spectrum and ensure it is being used for the correct purposes, as there is only a limited amount of spectrum overall. From the Administration of Barack Obama, they also would like to test the value of underutilized spectrum to be able to open new avenues of use. Since spectrum space is limited, looking at other spectrum could allow other licensees to move elsewhere, perhaps freeing up more for wireless. Utilizing other spectrum would allow development of advanced technologies. The Secretary of Commerce, National Science Foundation (NSF), Department of Defense, Department of Justice, NASA and other organizations have been designated to create a plan to explore these innovative spectrum-sharing technologies.

== Technology and infrastructure ==
In the 1950s, the town of Ten Sleep, Wyoming, had just set up their phone service using federal subsidies and stringing copper wire to every home. In 2005, they upgraded to fiber optic cable, giving the residents high-speed Internet access. This scenario caught President Obama's eye in terms of success, which he hopes to duplicate with the national wireless broadband. On February 10, 2011, he pointed to this example of what he wants to replicate and hopes it will help progress more economic development by providing Internet to almost all Americans. Brendan Greenley from Business Week magazine does not believe Obama's plan will create another success story. While examples are helpful to reference when creating a plan, not all plans react the same way. There are many different factors involved, such as geography and the type of users involved.

How a technology is designed and built is just as important as the technology itself. Without a proper infrastructure, a national wireless broadband network would not benefit the country. George Ford from the Phoenix Center commented that a reasonable target for broadband would be 95% Internet availability to Americans in five years and questioned the need for coverage across the entire country. There has been a large permeation of Internet users over the last five years. However, there are still reasons to have wired networking. As stated by Brendan Greeley, call centers and data storage facilities placed in smaller towns need the speed and capacity that a wired fiber optic network can provide. Wireless networks pose challenges that wired networks do not. One challenge is the infrastructure of a wireless network, like the spectrum, versus a wired network. For Ten Sleep, they installed fiber optic cable to increase their network speed. Wireless does not have this capability. Fiber optic cable has more capacity than the electromagnetic spectrum, meaning even if the entire spectrum was allocated to the national wireless network, there still would not be the same capacity in fiber optic.

=== New technologies ===
The newest generation of speed at "4G" is being deployed at rapid speeds throughout the United States by the leading carriers, and promises to be beneficial to the economy and society. Next-generation technology is ten times faster than current speeds and is capable of benefiting Americans, helping public safety increase, and further progressing the innovation for wireless applications, equipment and services. The advancement of technology is intended to move forward and catch up with other nations that have already implemented these technologies. The technological advances in wireless broadband, like mobile broadband, provide improved delivery of services.

=== Support of the wireless network ===
A supported infrastructure is important for any network, whether technologically based or socially based. The national wireless network is no different. Under Section 105 Interoperability of the bill S.28, the Commission must establish the technical and operational rules to ensure the national wireless networks are interoperable. It has so far yet to be established as to who will actually support the network, being the government or a private Internet service provider (ISP). Rules are to be established to permit a public safety licensee to authorize a service provider to construct and operate the wireless network. It is also in the plan to have the service provider use their licensee spectrum if the authorization would expedite broadband communications. The supporting parties will also have to ensure the safety of the network by protecting and monitoring against cyber attacks and any other form of security threat. It is imperative to have a secure network that is accessible for the nation to use. A safe environment is needed for new capabilities to be secure, trustworthy and provide necessary safeguards for privacy of users and public safety.

== Cost ==
President Obama estimated a one-time investment of $5 billion and a reformation of the Universal Service Fund to help millions of Americans get access to these technologies. Another estimated cost of the wireless broadband plan is $7.2 billion from stimulus funds. Another plan is calling for $10.7 billion to commit to the support, development and deployment of the wireless broadband. Despite the cost, wireless would help with public safety affordance of greater levels of effectiveness and interoperability. With broadband technologies developing, equipment and services are getting faster and cheaper. Again, Obama proposes to pay for the wireless network by having broadcasters give back their privilege to the spectrum for government auction. The auction would then be mostly profit so costs would come from the infrastructure and maintenance of the network, not the spectrum space. It is still questioned whether the costs are too high and if the end benefits outweigh those costs. In a report by George Ford at Fox News Channel, he stated that spending money on the last frontier of broadband has small incremental value. Obama not only estimated a one-time investment, but also stated a public safety cost. He called for a $10.7 billion investment to ensure public safety benefits from the technology and to have $3.2 billion to reallocate the D block of the spectrum as mentioned before. This band of the spectrum would be reserved solely for public safety as stated under current law. Another $7 billion would be needed to support the deployment of the network, and then $500 million from the Wireless Innovation (WIN) Fund for research and development, and to tailor the network to public safety needs. Although many billions of dollars will go towards building this plan, reducing the national deficit by billions of dollars can be considered worthwhile. Again, President Obama does hope that this plan will cut the nation deficit by $9.6 billion over the next ten years.

The thought of whether the cost is too high also raises other points in the media. John Horrigan of the Pew Research Center commented that the high cost of broadband now is why more Americans are not already using it. There is also the consideration that not every American has access to a computer. Although smartphones with Internet capabilities have been on the rise for many years now, there is still a reason the entire nation is not "online". Whether it is the cost of an Internet-ready device or computer, or obtaining Internet service, cost is still a big factor for this technology. In terms of cost, one-third of Americans who do not have broadband access say cost prohibits them from purchasing it.

== Impact on the people ==
Public interest is important for policies promoting wireless broadband for Americans. The interest of the public is important because if the public does not condone the cost and the utility, the nation will have to cover the failure of the deployment. However, the public may also consider this to be an excellent development for our country. Part of the national wireless broadband goal is to enable businesses to grow faster, help students learn more, and assist public safety officers with having the best, state-of-the-art technology and communications available. During his State of the Union address, President Obama announced a National Wireless Initiative to make available high speed wireless Internet services for 98% of Americans. This plan was primarily designed to get this technology to reach more rural areas that otherwise did not have the opportunity of obtaining the service. On February 10, 2011 President Obama was commended for his proposal on pursuing the plan with the idea that this would greatly increase jobs and innovation. The concept of the "last mile" is often brought up for ISPs as they try to expand their network, often time having to stop before the last house on the block because of cost. However, even though this issue happens throughout rural areas, 57% of Americans use broadband services with 91% already having access according to the Pew Internet & American Life Project. Those that have Internet can access an incredible amount of information at any time as long as they have an Internet-ready device. There has also been an increase in the applications that utilize Internet services. The proliferation of wireless applications is on the rise and continues to empower users and communities.

=== Home Internet usage ===
A national wireless broadband network is not only about providing Internet access for personal computers in the home, but for anyone with a wireless Internet-ready device. In 2006, the number of households passed over for high-speed Internet was 119 million, and over the past two years, the cable industry has invested $23 billion into their networks. As the number of homes serviced declines, broadband technology is able to develop. Commissioner Robert M. McDowell commented that the broadband technology has been the fastest in penetration of any technology in modern history. With the broadband technology, the number of devices that are Internet-ready has been increasing year after year. Both cell phone and laptops with wireless capabilities have increased Internet usage dramatically and have each grown more prevalent since 2009. It is no longer working professionals with high Internet use, but young adults as well. About 47% of adults go online with a laptop, up from 39% as of April 2009. Also, 40% of adults use a mobile phone, up from 32% in 2009. The world has seen great technologies, and the Internet is one of the fastest growing because of the number of devices designed to utilize it. According to Pew Research, 59% of adults access the Internet wirelessly through some type of wireless device. Again, this is an increase from the 51% in April 2009. Internet access has become a critical part of our lives. The deployment and development of wireless broadband as well as other technologies is critical to ensuring this reliable and ubiquitous service is available to Americans.

=== Impact on health matters and other public uses ===
Some have not only considered personal or business related uses of national wireless, but the health related uses for hospitals and their patients. As Blair Levin from the Technology, Innovation and Government Reform Team of President Obama states, this will create a world-class broadband platform allowing modernizing of health care records and reforming education. Being able to have the instant availability to health records for doctors and patients, and being able to teach and be taught from anywhere in the United States is a concept some may never have considered, or thought possible. As John Horrigan from the Pew Research Center stated, people not understanding the technology being of relevancy to them is a bigger barrier than the cost of the technology itself. Michael Powell stated Americans benefit most when policies enable consumers and businesses to fully utilize the benefits of emerging technology.

=== Public safety ===
Public safety has been mentioned in terms of the spectrum use and cost. Public safety is also important in regards to public interest. With the implementation of national wireless broadband, this initiative helps improve public safety communications. The Commission for 9/11 has noted that our homeland security is vulnerable due to lack of interoperable wireless communication among first responders. The plan would allow all public safety officials to be on the same network, and get the correct information quicker and safer. With 4G networking, they can be provided with a unique opportunity to deploy a system in conjunction with the commercial infrastructure already available.

== Network neutrality ==
Network neutrality is becoming a big issue with the policies involved in the national wireless plan. If the plan comes together, the question of restricting access to the Internet is reason for concern. Network neutrality is the concept of having no rules and regulations for what consumers are able to access through the Internet by their ISPs. As stated by the CTIA, our economic conditions make it hard to understand why people want to impose network neutrality rules, and inject uncertainty in an industry that seems to be working well for the U.S. This is for both wired and wireless broadband networks. These types of infrastructures cannot be managed for customers and expectations with a one-size-fits-all approach. The debate is due to the types of restrictions ISPs should be allowed to have if consumers are paying for the service they want. As with wired Internet access, the CTIA has stated that they strongly believe that regulation is not necessary and may do more harm than good.

More users are obtaining access to the internet and have the wireless devices to access it. It is no surprise that wireless is the fastest growing broadband service. There is also an increase in the number of users that rely solely on wireless instead of wired connections. Wireless service providers are constantly competing to create the best network with the best service and quality. With more towers and increased advanced technologies, wireless has become a convenient and widely accessible mode of communication. However, the negative is the technology which wireless Internet uses. Since the spectrum itself is limited and wireless data networks rely on the finite source.

Since the FCC has developed the plan to open the spectrum for the wireless network, the issue of network neutrality is cause for concern for some. The CTIA stated that the imposition of network neutrality will inject uncertainty in the market. Since this concept supports users having access to the information they want through the Internet, it raises the problem of consumers having limited options. This could ultimately harm consumers and hamper innovation.

== Pros vs. cons ==
Pros:

- Provides universal broadband Internet access to majority of Americans
- Intends to reduce the national deficit by billions of dollars
- Helps America to catch up on economic development that other countries have made years ago
- Creates jobs that otherwise continue to be lost
- Many Americans already switching to only wireless Internet
- Potential to improve public safety communications with everyone being on the same network
- Allows widespread access to health records and education

Cons:

- Takes away freedom of Americans choosing their own ISP
- Uses money from the U.S. government (FCC) that could be used for other products and services
- Removes current Internet Service Providers from the economy as they will no longer be needed by consumers
- Loss of jobs through ISPs
- Users may not realize the benefit of the technology and not use it to full potential
- Could threaten network neutrality
- Possible threat of security, cyber attacks, being one location for all information

== See also ==
- Hotspot (Wi-Fi)
- National Broadband Plan (United States)
- Spectrum auction
- Spectrum reallocation
- Wireless broadband
