= Universal Service Directive 2002 =

Directive 2002/22/EC
- European Union directive
- Title: Directive on universal service and users' rights relating to electronic communications networks and services
- Made by: European Parliament & Council

History
- Date made: 7 March 2002

The Universal Service Directive or formally Directive 2002/22/EC of the European Parliament and of the Council of 7 March 2002 on universal service and users' rights relating to electronic communications networks and services addresses so called universal service obligations and users' rights related to telecommunications in the European Union. The directive mandates that emergency services be accessible by dialing 112 on phones in EU member states.

== See also ==
- UK enterprise law
- Telecommunications in the European Union
- Universal service
- Broadband universal service
