= Broadband.gov =

US Federal Communications Commission website

- Website type: Government website
- Available in: English, Spanish
- Owner: Federal Communications Commission
- Website: http://www.broadband.gov/ (defunct)
- Commercial: No
- Current status: Inactive

Broadband.gov was a website run by the Federal Communications Commission of the United States that reported Internet access around the country. The FCC used the website to document the National Broadband Plan and its implementation, and inform the public about room for improvement by both Internet service providers and users.

== National Broadband Plan ==
The main purpose of Broadband.gov was to give the public insight into the National Broadband Plan, and the FCC's plans on how to spread the advancements in broadband technology to the nation. The website detailed how expanding broadband across the nation would improve health care, education, the environment, government performance speeds, civic engagement, and public safety in great detail on separate pages. In addition, the website gave continual reports on the government's progress on the National Broadband Plan, in both yearly and quarterly installments. Users could also download the National Broadband Plan from Broadband.gov for consumption by the general public. Any changes to the National Broadband Plan, or reports on the effectiveness of the plan thus far were also posted on the website for users to download and examine.

== Resources ==
Broadband.gov offered resources for consumers to see the local effects of the National Broadband Plan, and broadband as a whole. Featured was a Consumer Broadband Test that reported a user's internet download and upload speeds, latency and jitter. The government then used these resources to analyze the nation's broadband quality, and to plan future locations that needed improvements. Additional resources included a Deadzone Reporter, which allowed the user to inform the government of locations without broadband, the Spectrum Dashboard (ran off another site), which tells the user how broadband connections were spread among various radio frequencies, and a link to the broadband map.gov, which allowed the user to find any currently available broadband providers in their current location. Another important point of broadband.gov was to advocate the importance of the advancement of the medical field into the field of technology. Among the most advanced initiatives for using broadband is to improve health care in enhanced medical record-keeping that knits together electronic databases, giving patients and authorized providers instant and centralized access to information such as health histories, treatment regimens and medical images.

Broadband.gov also gave a brief overview to the user of what broadband is, how it relates to the Internet, its uses, and how having broadband Internet in the users' neighborhood will improve their daily living. Legal documents giving a framework of the National Broadband Plan, and other documents that show how the plan was progressing so far, were also included in this section for dissemination by the user.

== Workshops ==
Also contained on Broadband.gov was a list of workshops held by the FCC. "The goal of the workshops will be to promote an open dialogue between the FCC and key constituents on matters important to the National Broadband Plan." These meetings are held at the FCC and were put onto the Internet for everyone to have access to them. Past workshops included how the broadband would be deployed, how schools, small businesses, and on-the-job training would benefit, and the issues that could come up with distributing broadband to the nation. Field events were also planned across the nation to help the FCC get word out on the National Broadband Plan, broadband.gov, and the FCC's plans for the future work on the Broadband initiative. Field events also gave the public a chance to respond directly to FCC representatives about their concerns on the National Broadband Plan.

== Blog ==
Broadband.gov also encompassed one of the FCC's official blogs, nicknamed the BlogBand. The blog gave an inside view on the National Broadband plan and related issues. Here, various FCC commissioners and chair people made their comments on the future of the National Broadband plan, and the FCC's official stance on various forms of technology, such as the advancement of smartphone applications and their effects on daily routines, or a summary on the latest Consumer Electronics Show, and what the latest technologies could bring. The blog also gave progress on broadband.gov as well, giving statistical information about the usage of various parts of the website, such as the National Broadband Map.
