= Broadband universal service =

Ensuring all citizens of a country can access high-speed internet reliably

Broadband universal service, also known as universal service obligation (USO) or universal broadband service, refers to government efforts to ensure all citizens have access to the internet. Universal voice service obligations have been expanded to include broadband service obligations in Switzerland, Finland, Spain and the UK.

Universal service obligations are required because of the technical limitations of data transport in traditional telephone lines, particularly for connections located miles away from exchanges. FTTH deployment is increasingly a component of meeting universal service obligations, for example, the United Arab Emirates has not introduced a USO as all premises in the country have access to FTTH and are thus capable of very high connection speeds.

Switzerland was the first country in the world to provide broadband universal service in January 2008, followed by Spain and Finland each guaranteeing 1 Mbit/s. The UK followed by announcing a universal service obligation of 10 Mbit/s in 2020 for every home in Britain. Taiwan started broadband universal service in 2007. The USA has proposed measures that would make broadband available to all citizens, but under pressure from telecommunications companies, has not implemented them.

== Background ==
The term universal service was introduced in the early twentieth century. In many countries, such as the UK, United States, and Taiwan, voice telephony services have had subsidies for rural or poor customers.

Although broadband has a technical meaning, in public policy discussions it means Internet access at higher rates than obsolete dial-up Internet access.

=== Broadband overview ===
Faster and more widely available broadband is considered an important opportunity to improve education, communication, and public participation in civic affairs. U.S. President Barack Obama mentioned: "one key to strengthening education, entrepreneurship, and innovation in communities… is to harness the full power of the Internet, and that means faster and more widely available broadband." (Obama, 2009) The government claimed widespread broadband access is critical for global competitiveness, economic development, national security, public safety, job creation, civic engagement, etc.

=== Digital divide ===
One of the main goals to have universal broadband service is to narrow the digital divide ("digital split"). Digital divide refers to "the differing amount of information between those who have access to the Internet (specially broadband access) and those who do not have access. The term became popular among concerned parties, such as scholars, policy makers, and advocacy groups, in the late 1990s." Digital divide is not just about the access to the Internet, but the quality of connection, and the related service availability.

== Implementation ==
=== Switzerland ===
Switzerland was the first country in the world to provide broadband universal service with download/upload 600/100 kbit/s dataspeed to its citizens in January 2008,

=== Finland ===
In 2009, the Finnish Ministry of Transport and Communications announced a decree which required a 1 Mb Internet connection to be included in universal service mandates in 2010. Therefore, Finland became the first country in the world to establish broadband universal service, albeit at a basic speed, as a general right of citizens.

=== Spain ===
Spain guarantees 1 Mbit/s.

=== United Kingdom ===
In 2009, the UK announced a universal service commitment of 2 Mbit/s in 2012 for every home in Britain. In 2015, the UK announced a universal service obligation of 10 Mbit/s in 2020 for every home in Britain; however it was slow to implement the legislation, ultimately it came into force from 26 December 2022 requiring all new homes to be built with a minimum 1 Gigabit connection while funding was provided to suppliers for expanding existing coverage.

In March 2020, the UK government further adopted universal service obligation legislation that gives all homes and businesses the right to request a decent and affordable broadband connection. The legislation sets out broadband service conditions for the providers KCOM in the Hull area and BT for the rest of the UK.

=== Botswana ===
Botswana Telecommunications Corporation (BTC) intends to deliver high Internet speed up to 50 Mbit/s. It will be piloted in Gaborone, Francistown, Maun and would later be rolled out to other parts of the country by 2020.

=== Canada ===
In 2016, Canada announced a universal service obligation of 50 Mbit/s by 2021.

=== Belgium ===
Belgium has a universal service obligation of 1000 Mbit/s for 50% of the population by 2020.

=== Sweden ===
Sweden has set a target of 100 Mbit/s for 95% of its population by 2020, and a USO of 1000 Mbit/s to 98% of the population (100 Mbit/s to the next 1.9% and 30 Mbit/s to the final 0.1%) by 2025.

=== Taiwan ===
In 2012, the National Communications Commission (NCC) set up the goal to offer Internet access services with a speed of 12 Mbit/s to every village in Taiwan to shorten the digital divide between urban and rural areas. This universal service mandate was supported by the Telecommunication Universal Service Fund. More than fifty remote villages which did not have broadband service are able to access broadband.

In March 2018, the main technologies of broadband access network were ADSL and FTTH in Taiwan. The household coverage rate of ADSL, whose downlink connection speed is from 2 to 8 Mbit/s, was approximately 98%, and around 97% in remote areas. Meanwhile, the coverage rate of FTTH of which speed is above 100 Mbit/s was upwards of 90%, and 63% or so in remote areas.

In order to promote the development of broadband infrastructure and emerging applications, the Taiwanese government is implementing the "Digital Nation and Innovative Economic Development Plan (2017-2025)" (DIGI+ program) which increase the household coverage rate of Gigabit broadband to 90% by 2020. Under this plan, the National Communications Commission is implementing "the infrastructure of broadband access plan for remote areas" and bundling with telecommunications universal service mechanism to increase the broadband coverage rate of 100 Mbit/s or above to 70% in remote areas.

=== Japan ===
In Japan, based on the Telecommunications Business Law Article 7, telecommunications carriers that provide universal service must endeavor to provide that service in an appropriate, fair, and stable manner. These services include subscriber line access, public telephone service and emergency calls service. The Ministry of Internal Affairs and Communications (MIC) is in charge of the Universal Service Fund in Japan.

=== United States ===
Based on a survey conducted by the United States Census Bureau in 2009 (N=50,000, unit: household), people with high incomes, those who are younger, more highly educated, and the employed, have higher rates of broadband use at home. People with low incomes, minorities, seniors, the less-educated, and the non-employed tend to have lower rates of broadband use at home. Besides, there are rural/urban differences as well. People in rural areas are less likely to adopt the Internet.

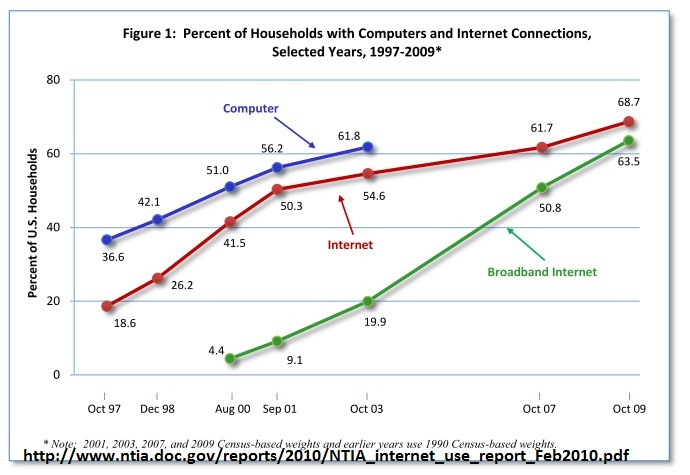
NTIA2010

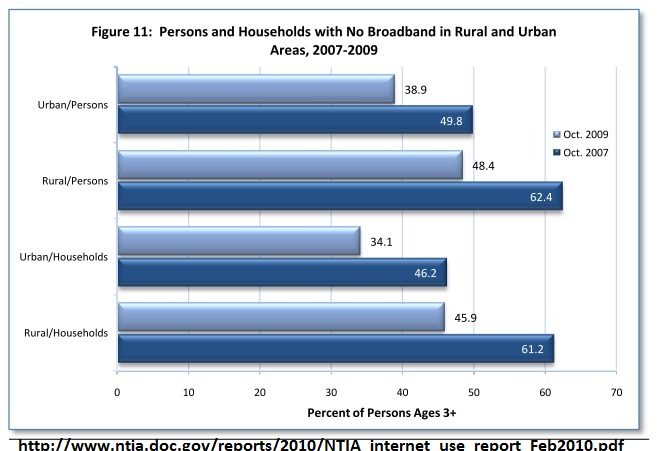
NTIA2010

According to NTIA (2011), almost one-third of American households still lack a broadband connection. Rural America lags behind urban areas by ten percentage points (60% versus 70%)."

Obama launched a policy campaign to counter nineteen state laws, which are currently preventing cities from investing in broadband Internet. According to U.S. News, the predicted effects of broadband investment is that it will increase Internet speeds and access, and give cities a competitive advantage. A research study done by the NTIA (National Telecommunications and Information Administration), showed that building new broadband infrastructure in communities increased broadband availability by around 2% more than cities that didn’t build new broadband infrastructures. Investing in broadband is also predicted to lead to an, "Increased economic output of as much as $21 billion annually," according to NTIA.

In order to "get people connected for basic communications that opens the door to economic and civic participation in cyberspace," it is essential to provide basic broadband connectivity at an affordable prices. For years, the U.S. has endeavored to ensure its residents are connected to essential telecommunications. Following a 2008 release of broadband statistics by the Organisation for Economic Co-operation and Development (OECD) which suggested that the U.S. may be lagging in broadband, Congress passed the American Recovery and Reinvestment Act of 2009 (ARRA) requiring that the FCC draft a National Broadband Plan, and the FCC's efforts to ensure hard-to-serve areas and demographics are reached by communications technologies have focused on broadband. As U.S. President Obama mentioned, "this isn't just about faster Internet or fewer dropped calls. It's about connecting every part of America to the digital age. It’s about a rural community in Iowa or Alabama where farmers and small business owners will be able to sell their products all over the world. It’s about a firefighter who can download the design of a burning building onto a handheld device; a student who can take classes with a digital textbook; or a patient who can have face-to-face video chats with her doctor." –President Obama, State of the Union Address, January 25, 2011.

NTIA (2010) also pointed out, "universal access to and adoption of 21st Century broadband for all citizens is a top priority for the Obama Administration. Widespread access is critical to America’s future as the world’s economic leader because of its impact on increasing our productivity, global competitiveness, and improving Americans’ quality of life – through economic growth and development, job creation, national security, telemedicine, distance learning, public safety, civic engagement, and telework."

==== Necessity of broadband ====
According to NTIA (2010), the major reason for people not having high speed Internet use at home is "don’t need/not interested" (37.8%), and the second one is "too expensive" (26.3%). Some therefore argue the government should not be paying for a service people do not want.

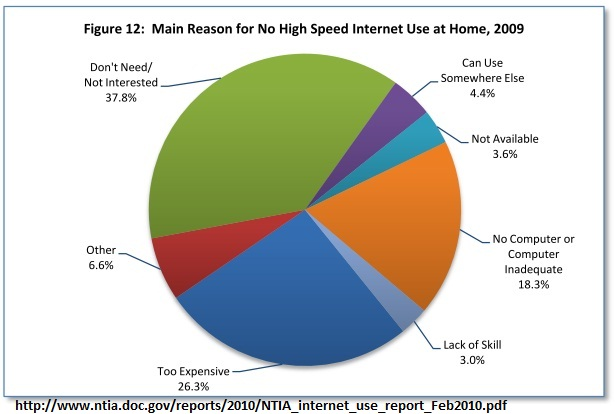
NTIA2010

==== Government intervention ====
Some people argue that universal service policies may not be the best way to increase broadband penetration. If the regulators could increase incentives to ensure operators offer such services, the market instead of government mandates might lead to universally available broadband service. Maybe there are other steps can be taken to design the service and tariff packages without subsidies to ensure broadband penetration.

==== Funding system ====
One of the biggest concerns regarding universal broadband service is "how to use the universal service funding efficiently and effectively." How could the regulator ensure the cost proposed by the operators is true and reasonable? In the National Broadband Plan, the FCC planned to eliminate the rate-of-return regulation in the Universal Service Fund (USF). This may result in the uncertainty of profits to ILECs and decrease their incentives to provide broadband universal service.

In the United States, the notion of universal service was initially advocated by Theodore Vail, the vice president of AT&T, who proposed a policy based on "one system, one policy, universal service." Universal service mainly refers to "Government policies to promote the affordability of telephone service and access to the network."

Universal service advocates say ubiquitous communications infrastructures can enhance national unity and equality of opportunity. Therefore, it could be a way to express "liberal egalitarianism." The Telecommunications Act of 1996 required the U.S. Federal Communications Commission (FCC) to promote all citizens be able to access advanced telecommunication services at a reasonable price. These services mainly included voice telephony services, both the fixed lines and wireless phones.

The goals of universal Service, as mandated by the 1996 Act, were to:

- Promote the availability of quality services at just, reasonable and affordable rates for all consumers
- Increase nationwide access to advanced telecommunications services
- Advance the availability of such services to all consumers, including those in low income, rural, insular, and high cost areas at rates that are reasonably comparable to those charged in urban areas
- Increase access to telecommunications and advanced services in schools, libraries and rural health care facilities
- Provide equitable and non-discriminatory contributions from all providers of telecommunications services to the fund supporting universal service programs

In 2010, the Federal-State Joint Board on Universal Service agreed that universal service programs need to support broadband service.

In February 2011, President Obama announced the Wireless Innovation and Infrastructure Initiative.

==== National Broadband Plan ====
In the US, the broadband universal service concept is rooted in the universal service mandate in Telecommunications Act of 1996. Arguments regarding the National Broadband Plan are also related to broadband universal service debates.

The US National Broadband Plan was released by the FCC in March 2010. The agency started the process of creating this plan in April 2009. After holding thirty-six public workshops and streamed online, with more than 10,000 people and 700 parties participated, 23,000 comments were generated. The FCC filed about 13,000 pages and held nine public hearings to refine and clarify the plan and proposed it in 2010.

The plan mentions many potential policies. For example, the federal government intended to make 500 MHz of spectrum available to promote wireless broadband. It proposed the "Connect America Fund (CAF) to support the provision of affordable broadband and voice with at least 4 Mbit/s actual download speeds and shift up to $15.5 billion over the next decade from the existing Universal Service Fund (USF) program to support broadband".

==== National Broadband Map ====
The National Broadband Map was created by the NTIA and FCC. It was launched on February 17, 2011. It is a searchable database of information on high-speed Internet access. Although the map was in an early stage of development and contained errors, by entering specific addresses, users can acquire information on how connected their communities are. On the website of the National Broadband Map, broadband providers are listed in order of their maximum speed advertised.

==== Universal Service Fund Reforms and Connect America Fund ====
On April 21, 2010, the US FCC launched a notice of inquiry (NOI) and notice of proposed rulemaking (NPRM) for what it called the "once-in-a-generation transformation" of the Universal Service Fund (USF).

According to the National Broadband Plan, the FCC planned to make 4 megabits per second download speeds and 1 Mbit/s upload speed available to all Americans by 2020. To support this, two funds will be created: the Connect America Fund (CAF) and the Mobility Fund. The CAF will replace high cost programs in the USF but will only provide funds to areas where there is no private operator willing to provide broadband service for a lack of profitability. The Mobility Fund will mainly focus on the wireless Internet access.

There are three stages in the plan. The first stage aims to set up the overall policymaking apparatus. In this stage, the Universal Service Fund transforms from telephone service support to broadband service support. The Connect American Fund and the Mobility Fund will be created in the first stage. In the second stage, scheduled for 2012–2016, these two new funds will distribute the funds they have collected. Broadband services will be taxed to support the funds. In the third stage, scheduled in 2017–2020, the USF will be discontinued.

In February 2011, the FCC adopted an NPRM and Further Notice of Proposed Rulemaking (FNPRM) to ask for comments on reforming the Universal Service Fund and the Commission’s intercarrier compensation (ICC). The FCC planned workshops to discuss the reforms. The first workshop was held on February 17, 2011. The second workshop was held on April 27, 2011 and the main theme was related to the implementation of a Phase I of the Connect America Fund (CAF), including the costs and capabilities of broadband technologies and the use of the funds in Phase I of the CAF.

On October 27, 2011, the FCC adopted its "Connect America Fund & Intercarrier Compensation Reform Order" which established a $4.5 billion Connect America Fund to expand broadband access to seven million unserved rural Americans, replacing the Universal Service Fund's high-cost support and explicitly endorsing broadband as a universal service. The Connect America Fund also includes $500 million for mobile broadband, of which $100 million is set aside for mobile broadband on tribal lands.

On November 9, 2011, the Connect-to-Compete program was announced. Businesses and non-profit groups will work together to provide broadband access for low-income people in the United States. 35 million households, about one-third of the total, many of them poor, do not have the service. Persons without broadband have a harder time finding jobs using the Internet.

By Summer 2012, homes in which children qualify for the federal school lunch program will become eligible for $9.95 broadband service. Also as part of the program, Microsoft will also sell PCs with Office Suite for $250.

==== State efforts ====
In Massachusetts, an ARRA grant was supplemented with state funds in 2010 for the Massachusetts Broadband Institute to extend broadband access to the entire state.

==== COVID-19 ====
As a result of the COVID-19 pandemic, access to broadband Internet became important for work, education and other purposes when people had to shelter in place. But 28 percent of Americans either could not get it or could not afford it. The number was 23 percent in cities.

== See also ==
- Right to Internet access
- Universal service
- Universal Service Fund
- Universal Service Directive 2002
- Telecommunications Act of 1996
- Broadband
- Satellite Internet access
- Federal Communications Commission
- National Broadband Plan (United States)
- National broadband plan
- Digital Britain
