= National Broadband Plan (United States) =

Strategic plan to improve internet access

Connecting America: The National Broadband Plan is a Federal Communications Commission (FCC) plan to improve Internet access in the United States. The FCC was directed to create the plan by the American Recovery and Reinvestment Act of 2009, and unveiled its plan on March 16, 2010.

The act did not give the FCC specific jurisdiction to carry out a national broadband plan or to amend the universal service provisions of the Telecommunications Act of 1996, but it required that the FCC draft a plan to "include a detailed strategy for achieving affordability and maximizing use of broadband to advance consumer welfare, civic participation, public safety and homeland security, community development, health care delivery, energy independence and efficiency, education, employee training, private sector investment, entrepreneurial activity, job creation and economic growth, and other national purposes."

An official website for the plan, broadband.gov, highlighted energy and environment features. Other goals listed were "21st century care", "economic opportunity", "health care", "civic engagement" and "public safety". Broadband maps, tests and reporting of "broadband dead zones" were also featured. Another goal was providing 100 million American households with access to 100 Mbit/s (megabits per second) connections by 2020. Large areas of the United States would be wired for Internet access, and the federal Rural Utilities Service providing some rural areas with landline telephone service would be upgraded. The plan called for broadcasters to give up spectrum for wireless broadband access.

The author of the requirement to draw up the plan, U.S. Representative Edward J. Markey (D-MA) praised the FCC's plan as a "roadmap" that would "ensure that every American has access to the tools they need to succeed." The Obama administration promoted the plan, and former FCC Chairman Julius Genachowski, named the plan "his top priority".

== Details ==
=== Goals ===
The goals of the plan are described on broadband.gov:

1. At least 100 million U.S. homes should have affordable access to actual download speeds of at least 100 megabits per second and actual upload speeds of at least 50 megabits per second by the year 2020.
2. The United States should lead the world in mobile innovation, with the fastest and most extensive wireless networks of any nation.
3. Every American should have affordable access to robust broadband service, and the means and skills to subscribe if they so choose.
4. Every American community should have affordable access to at least 1 gigabit per second broadband service to anchor institutions such as schools, hospitals, and government buildings.
5. To ensure the safety of the American people, every first responder should have access to a nationwide, wireless, interoperable broadband public safety network.
6. To ensure that America leads in the clean energy economy, every American should be able to use broadband to track and manage their real-time energy consumption.

=== Spectrum reallocation ===
The plan also aimed to reallocate spectrum to increase capacity of mobile broadband, in response to increased demand. Cisco Systems reported that "global mobile data traffic grew 2.6-fold in 2010, nearly tripling for the third year in a row." AT&T Mobility reported that usage of its data network increased 8000% between 2007 and 2010, a time period concurrent with the release of the iPhone.

In a report presented at the 2010 Mobile Future Forum, Peter Rysavy presented the dangers of not allocating additional spectrum. He predicted that without a reallocation, demand would exceed supply in 3–4 years, and noted that many minority and lower-income people depend on mobile internet as a primary connection.

The plan recommends that 300 MHz of spectrum to be made newly available for commercial use over 5 years and 500 MHz after 10 years. The plan targets space between 225 MHz and 3.7 GHz; 120 MHz of Broadcast TV and 90 MHz of mobile satellite service. To fulfill this plan, the FCC must identify spaces in spectrum that can be used more effectively and then reclaim spectrum from incumbent licensees. The plan recommends that the FCC be given more authority to create new incentives to liberate spectrum. The FCC's basic approach would be to offer incentives to accelerate the process and avoid lengthy litigation proceedings.

The spectrum auctions were authorized as part of the payroll tax cut extension passed by Congress on February 17, 2012. As the Plan reached its first anniversary, Congressional interest in the Plan's potential revenue from auctions increased, especially in light of Federal budget deficits. The wireless industry's main trade association, CTIA, and the Consumer Electronics Association, jointly released a report indicating that auctions from relinquished frequencies from broadcasters might garner $33 billion in revenue from auctions.

=== Energy management ===
FCC chairman Julius Genachowski said the broadband plan was a prerequisite for smart grid technology, which he expected to reduce power plants' greenhouse gas consumption by 12 percent, the same as if 55 million cars were no longer driven. Goal 6 of the plan stated that Americans should have the right to redirect live usage data securely to any energy demand management service provider they chose, for assistance in managing demand of all kinds (including potentially fossil fuel use, water and other utilities).

Goal 6 implies access to demand-side opportunities such as turning on devices (such as sump or cistern pumps or battery chargers) that can use intermittent or off-peak power when it is available (more cheaply than at peak). In October 2009, General Electric and Whirlpool announced a Smart Green Grid Initiative. "Smart appliances" could schedule energy use at times when less energy was being used or when renewable energy such as wind was more available.

To achieve Goal 6, appliances would need to communicate to the energy metering and management system and accept commands to change state. In 2010 AC power line communication in the home was considered an option. The plan recommendations, however, did not mention specific technologies for home networking.

== Reasons ==
The U.S. has fallen behind Japan, the EU and South Korea in power grid technology, and has made it a national priority to improve its energy demand and supply management. The Pentagon has noted in several reports that reliance on oil and other diplomatically dangerous sources is a growing US national security concern. Consuming more energy per unit productivity than any other developed nation is no longer an option for the US according to the Obama administration which has made it a high priority to implement 'smart grid' technologies that are impossible to deploy without secure reliable and universal wired networking. The prior Bush administration had made powerline networking a priority to ensure that broadband access would be at least co-extant with the power grid's reach.

More generally, as of December 2012, only about 65 percent of Americans had broadband access. The United States ranks 16th in the world, with South Korea at 95 percent and Singapore at 88 percent. Genachowski said over 20 countries had plans for broadband access, and that the lack of access in rural and low-income areas in the United States resulted in "leaving millions behind".

By 2020, the goal was for 100 million households to have access to 100 Mbit/s service. 200 million people had broadband in 2009 (nationwide, the average connection speed was 3.9 Mbit/s), up from 8 million in 2000. But 14 million have no access whatsoever to broadband.

An FCC survey, "Broadband Adoption and Use in America," gave the average price of broadband access as $41/month, and said 36 percent those non-users surveyed said the service was too expensive. 12 percent lacked skills, 10 percent worried about "safety and privacy", and 19 percent were just not interested. One way to increase access would be to provide a block of spectrum to service providers who agreed to offer free or low-cost service to certain subscribers. One way to pay for this would be to transfer $15.5 billion to a Connect America Fund for areas not adequately served. This money would come from the Universal Service Fund created for telephone service for individuals and Internet access for schools and libraries. In addition, a Mobility Fund would provide funds for states to offer their own broadband programs. Also, Digital Literacy Corps would help people learn about the Internet in areas with low usage rates. And broadband would be added to the FCC's Lifeline and Link-Up program to provide phone service to the poor.

== Opposition ==
The FCC has been quoted as saying the plan could cost anywhere from $20 billion to $350 billion, and these costs only take into account the cost of implementing the system and getting it up and running, not the costs of maintaining it in the future. Some other costs to take into account are the cost of the National Emergency Response Network, which officials have said will cost at least $12 billion to $16 billion to build. Another cost that must be taken into account is the cost of subsidizing materials like computers for households that cannot afford them. Those citizens would then need to receive training on how to use the computers and Internet effectively. All of these costs are going to add up to many billions of dollars.

There have been several suggestions for ways in which the United States will pay for this plan. The first part involves taking the $4.6 billion per year that is allocated for the Universal Service Fund, and moving it to a fund under a new name that would continue providing subsidized phone service, but also work on getting broadband internet to those who currently do not have it. This will help offset the costs, but the regulators will have to make sure that there are still enough of those funds going toward providing the same amount of supported phone service, including rural landline and wireless services, as before. This money will help offset some of the costs of the implementation, but if it is in fact going to be closer to $350 billion, then that will not be enough money to cover the costs of the project. This will leave the rest of the cost burden on the government, who may in turn place it on the citizens as a tax.

Aside from the cost, there is also an argument that the creation of a National Broadband Plan will stunt the growth of the industry and new technologies. Economist Robert Atkinson argues that such a plan will reduce the desire for companies to offer lower prices, better products, and better customer service, as well as lessening incentive to come up with new and innovative ideas.

As the FCC has moved into the implementation stage of its plan, the jurisdictional question has arisen as to whether Congress provided the FCC with authority to implement the plan, or whether ARRA solely granted the agency authority to draft the plan. Commenters and state officials have raised the question of how agency proposals can be implemented so as to ensure rural areas do not experience deterioration or price spikes for existing telephone and cellular services. Commenters have expressed concern that if current support provided to rural areas in accordance with the Communications Act is moved to a much smaller subset of areas for broadband deployment, the currently supported rural areas will be deprived of much needed service coverage and affordable pricing. The FCC has proposed supporting only one provider per area, which commenters have stated would waste the universal service funds that have been invested in infrastructure other providers have already deployed in rural areas, and would result in a single monopoly service provider in many rural areas. This could mean some rural areas would end up with no telephone service or no cellular service, depending on which technology is supplied by the auction winner.

== Regulatory framework ==
The FCC considered broadband to be an "information service" and, therefore, "lightly regulated". Although the commission believed this status gave the ability to impose the necessary restrictions in order to implement the plan, the U.S. Court of Appeals for the District of Columbia said this was not the case, in an April 2010 ruling. In 2007, Kevin J. Martin, FCC chairman at the time, ordered Comcast to allow the use of BitTorrent, which Comcast considered to be competition to its cable business. Comcast argued that with deregulation under George W. Bush, the FCC had no authority to make such decisions. The United States Supreme Court sided with Comcast in 2005, and in a related ruling on April 6, 2010, the Appeals Court denied FCC's 2008 cease and desist order. As a result, FCC chairman Julius Genachowski wanted to redefine broadband as a "common carrier", requiring equal access to all traffic as on roads.

On May 6, 2010, Genachowski said rules for broadband companies would be less strict than intended, in order to keep the FCC from appearing "heavy-handed". Republicans in the United States Congress and at the FCC, and cable and telephone companies were expected to oppose the regulations necessary to make the broadband plan work. Network neutrality, for example, would require broadband providers to allow competitors to use their lines for telephone service, streaming video and other online services. However, Genachowski said networks would not be required to share with the competition.

Three of the five commissioners would have to approve the regulations. Genachowski, a Democrat, believed the other two Democratic FCC commissioners would support him. Rep. Ed Markey of Massachusetts, a Democratic member of the House committee overseeing the FCC, supported the proposal, saying the FCC needed to make sure consumers and businesses were protected.

The two Republican FCC commissioners, Robert McDowell and Meredith Baker, feared "burdensome rules excavated from the early-Ma Bell-monopoly era onto 21st century networks" which would prevent companies from making the necessary investments to improve their networks.

House Minority Leader John Boehner of Ohio called the plan "a government takeover of the Internet."

Genachowski said regulations would "support policies that advance our global competitiveness and preserve the Internet as a powerful platform for innovation."

== History ==
=== Survey by NTIA (2008) ===
In the Federal Communications Commission's Fifth Report before Congress, released in June 2008, the FCC reported:

Based on our analysis in this Report, we conclude that the deployment of advanced telecommunications capability to all Americans is reasonable and timely. The data reflect the industry's extensive investment in broadband deployment, including at higher speeds, as evidenced by increased subscribership for those higher-speed services.

The report stated that 47% of adult Americans had access in the home, rural home broadband adoption was at 31%, and over 57.8 million U.S. households subscribed to broadband at home. The NTIA contended that universal, affordable access was being provided in the home, workplace, classroom, and library. When measuring subscription rates of low-income areas, the survey reported that "92 percent of the lowest-income zip codes have at least one high-speed subscriber, compared with 99.4 percent of the highest-income zip codes." However, criticism came from within the FCC itself. Then FCC Commissioner Jonathan Adelstein disagreed with this conclusion citing the "downward trend" of the country's broadband ranking, and Commission Michael Copps criticized the FCC's data collection methods.

=== OECD Survey ===
In 2008, the Organisation for Economic Co-operation and Development (OECD) released statistics on broadband deployment. These statistics raised concerns that the U.S. may be lagging in broadband rollout, adoption, and pricing when compared to other developed nations. The United States ranked 15th out of 30 countries measured in broadband penetration; Denmark, the Netherlands, Norway, Switzerland, Iceland, Sweden, Korea and Finland were well-above the OECD average. The average download speed in the U.S. was 4.9 Mbit/s, while the OECD average was 9.2 Mbit/s.

On the basis of these statistics, critics argued that the FCC's previous assessment was inaccurate and incomplete. In a paper addressing this issue, Rob Frieden argued that "the FCC and NTIA have overstated broadband penetration and affordability by using an overly generous and unrealistic definition of what qualifies as broadband service, by using zip codes as the primary geographic unit of measure, by failing to require measurements of actual as opposed to theoretical bitrates, and by misinterpreting available statistics."

=== Schools ===
On June 6, 2013 at Mooresville Middle School in Mooresville, North Carolina, President Barack Obama announced plans for ConnectEd, a plan to provide high-speed Internet to many schools that did not already have it. Under the 1996 Telecommunications Act, schools and libraries paid lower prices for telecommunications services, and Obama wanted the E-Rate program expanded to include Internet access. White House aides made the claim that only one-fifth of American students could use high-speed Internet at school, but all South Korea students could. Repeating a similar goal from 2008, Obama stated he would ask the FCC to "connect 99 percent of America's students to high-speed broadband Internet within five years."

=== Debate ===
Internet access has become a vital tool in development and social progress since the start of the 21st century. Broadband Internet penetration rates are now treated as key economic indicators with the United States widely perceived as falling behind in both its rate of broadband Internet penetration and the speed of its broadband infrastructure.

As a result, there have been calls for the U.S. to develop, adopt, fund, and implement a National Broadband Plan. Proponents and opponents advance a number of arguments for and against the need for and advisability of creating such a plan.

- Meeting important public needs: In the 21st century, Internet access is recognized as a basic utility similar to telephones, water, and electricity. Most agree Internet access is needed in order to fully participate in society. For example, in the 2008 presidential elections, candidates delivered weekly addresses through videos on the Internet. These videos were often not available anywhere else. Proponents of national broadband policy argue that situations like the 2008 presidential elections illustrate that broadband internet access is a vital commodity for complete civic engagement.
- Entertainment: Broadband can provide entertainment in ways that television and radio cannot. Webisodes, mini-episodes that are not usually aired on cable television, are an example of this extension of traditional television. For example, Bravo has given users the opportunity to view "Top Chef" on their personal computers. An entertainment advantage of these Webisodes is the idea that the users are able to view the behind the scenes footage that occur after the contestants are kicked off the show. This kind of extension of entertainment marks a change in the way we utilize internet access, and a hybridization of media.
- Economic growth: Supporters of national broadband policy also argue that Internet access allows consumers to contribute to economic growth and innovation. Many services have moved business onto the Internet, a shift that is manifested through tools such as online banking, account referencing for utilities, and online library databases.
- Education: Those in favor of a national broadband policy also claim that many educational resources, including online classes and interactive learning simulations can only be found on the web. They believe that Internet access for all is necessary to create a truly American environment of equal opportunity.
- Lifelong learning: Proponents of national broadband policy argue that online library databases, textbooks, and encyclopedias, have made the Internet a premier tool for education and lifelong learning. They maintain that the availability of broadband for all would provide a number of other highly valuable public benefits.
- Rural access: Some in favor of a national broadband policy argue it will provide the infrastructure necessary to bring broadband Internet to rural areas of the United States. Many inhabitants of rural areas who are willing to pay for broadband service cannot get it. Low population density causes high costs and low profits and prevents most providers from doing business in the rural United States.
- Urban access: Proponents of national broadband policy believe that it would have a positive effect on the urban poor and provide them with many more opportunities for Internet access. In impoverished urban areas, many people are unable to afford the payments to bring broadband services into their homes. In 2008, roughly 50% of the United States population made an annual income of $50,000 or less. Of that half of the population, only 35% of the population could afford cost of monthly payments for broadband services. Some telecommunications companies have made a small effort to provide more affordable broadband rates for the 15% of the population that could not afford broadband before. However, non-profits like One Economy are the current primary source of funding used to provide low-income families with broadband access.
- Healthcare: More citizens could research hospitals and physicians prior to traveling so as to receive better medical care (a benefit particularly important for those who live in rural areas and travel long distances for medical treatment).
- Jobs: More citizens could research jobs and investments, providing more opportunities for economic stability.
- Telecommuting: More citizens could work from home, which accommodates personal or health needs, as well as reduces the use of travel-related resources usually used for commuting.
- Politics: More citizens could educate themselves on political issues, news, and other important civic issues, using the Internet to become more informed and/or more active.
- Government / citizen communication: If all citizens had Internet access, the government would have a more efficient tool to communicate and interact with its citizens quickly and effectively, particularly in terms of processes currently executed on paper. Broadband could also help the government provide aid efficiently, particularly in areas affected by disasters.
- Inefficiencies, stifled innovation and competition: Those against a national broadband policy argue that allowing the government to regulate and manage broadband development will cause efficiency and progress to wane, due to lack of competition. They also maintain that government involvement will inevitably result in profit losses for companies and businesses.
- Possible government waste and lack of attention to real user needs: Opponents of national broadband policy warn that in an attempt to achieve the desired goal of broadband for all, the government will waste billions of dollars on an infrastructure that people do not need or cannot use. They believe the money will be ill-spent because the government will not give attention to customer needs and desires with the same specificity exercised by the corporate sector.
- Negative effect on the economy: Furthermore, those who do not advocate a national broadband policy claim that increases in broadband coverage could have an unexpected negative effect on the United States economy. They believe that many service sector jobs currently based in the United States could be moved offshore and fulfilled by lower-wage foreign workers. Opponents thus suggest that the relationship between economic growth and broadband penetration is questionable, emphasizing the notion that statistics are often misleading. They do not believe that such statistics are an adequate indicator that a national broadband policy is needed in the United States.

== Implications ==
According to the plan, one hundred million Americans do not have broadband at home and the U.S. continues to lag in Internet access speed. The FCC brought out a plan and recommendations to address these problems, along with approaches to maximize the economic and social gains from broadband adoption.

This plan is specializing the role of broadband in education, health care, energy and the environment, government performance, civic engagement, public safety, and economic opportunity. Also includes a recognition that broadband obtainment cannot occur without the active participation of the states.

=== Government ===
A number of recommendations have clear implications for policy action by state and local governments. On the basic issue of expanded access to broadband, the FCC recommendations include:

- Congress should make clear that tribal, state, regional and local governments can build broadband networks. (Recommendation 8.19)

As private investors do not always have the strongest incentives to deploy broadband in rural and underserved communities at an affordable price, states and local leaders should be allowed to step in to provide affordable broadband services that will meet their residents' needs.

- Federal and state policies should facilitate demand aggregation and use of state, regional and local networks when that is the most cost-efficient solution for anchor institutions to meet their connectivity needs. (Recommendation 8.20)

Pooling demand among institutions can provide more access to a wider constituency at lower prices.

- State legislators are essential partners in developing the framework that will help anchor institutions to obtain broadband connectivity, training, applications, and services. (Recommendation 8.22)

States should complement broadband deployment with digital education programs and fund community technology centers to ensure that residents of all ethnicities, socio-economic backgrounds, and ages understand how to be producers as well as consumers of this new media economy.

- When feasible, Congress should consider allowing state and local governments to get lower service prices by participating in federal contracts for advanced communications services. (Recommendation 14.2)
- The FCC plan provides additional recommendations for the inclusion of tribal leaders in broadband programs, construction of new networks in areas that are currently un-served, and the establishment of the Connect America Fund to address the broadband availability gap in un-served areas.

The FCC recommendations also focused on helping states make broadband more affordable and increasing the training needed to encourage adoption, including:

- An expansion of the Lifeline Assistance and Link-Up America programs, where states already have these discount programs in place, as in Vermont, the FCC recommends letting states determine their own eligibility requirements.
- The creation of a National Digital Literacy Program to increase the skills needed to participate in the digital economy.
- The collection of more comprehensive and reliable information on broadband pricing, performance, and competition in specific market segments to better inform policymakers on affordability problems in specific communities.

=== Political ===
"Public policy makers throughout the world are faced with the need to update, replace, and/or revise existing regulations that govern the relationships between and among traditional video distribution platforms, such as over-the-air and cable/satellite providers, as the internet emerges as a viable video distribution platform."

== See also ==
- Broadband universal service
- Broadband mapping in the United States
- Policies promoting wireless broadband in the United States
