= Jonathan Adelstein =

American politician

Jonathan Steven Adelstein
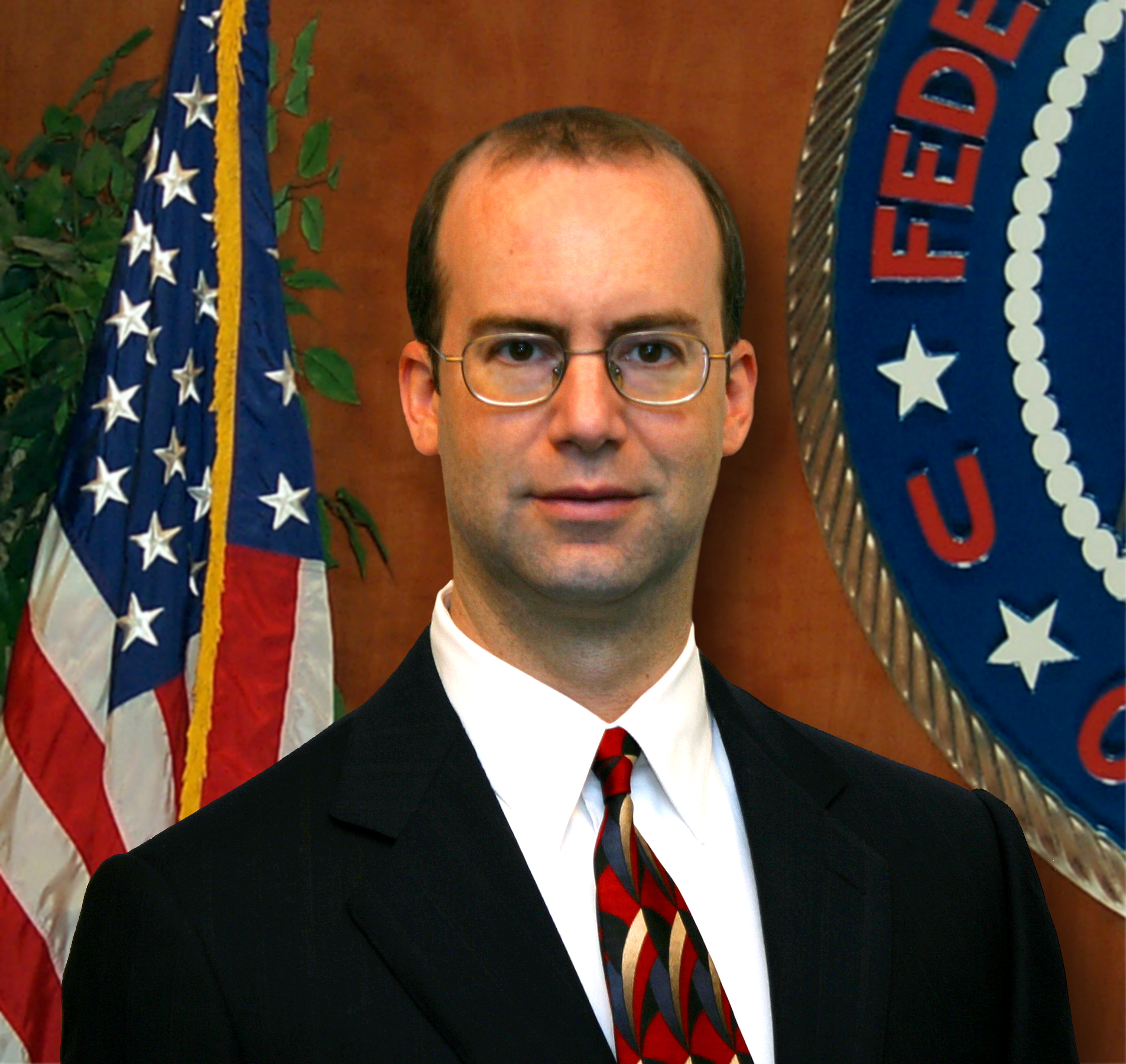

Commissioner, Federal Communications Commission
- In office December 3, 2002 – June 29, 2009
- President: George W. Bush; Barack Obama

Administrator, Rural Utilities Service, United States Department of Agriculture
- In office July 2009 – September 2012
- President: Barack Obama
- Preceded by: James M. Andrew
- Succeeded by: John Charles Padalino

Personal details
- Born: Rapid City, South Dakota, U.S.
- Citizenship: United States of America
- Spouse: Karen Brenner
- Relations: Stan Adelstein (father)
- Education: Stanford University (B.A., M.A.)
- Profession: Public policy
- Committees: United States President's Council of Advisors on Science and Technology; White House Business Council

Jonathan Steven Adelstein is an American political appointee and trade association president. He was nominated to posts by Republican President George W. Bush and Democratic President Barack Obama, serving as a Commissioner of the Federal Communications Commission (FCC) and Administrator of the United States Department of Agriculture (USDA) Rural Utilities Service.

From 2012 to 2022, Mr. Adelstein served as the president and CEO of the Wireless Infrastructure Association (WIA), which represents over 200 companies that own and build wireless broadband facilities in the United States. During his tenure, WIA tripled in revenue, achieved a number of federal policy goals, and established a state program that successfully steered legislation in over 30 states.

Adelstein joined DigitalBridge on 1 June 2022 as the managing director and head of global policy and public investment. In April 2024, he was named as the executive vice president, chief strategy, and external affairs officer at TWN. He also serves as the senior advisor to Vertical Bridge.

== Education ==
Adelstein received an M.A. in History and a B.A., with Distinction, in Political Science from Stanford University. He attended Harvard Kennedy School at Harvard University and served as a Teaching Fellow in history at Harvard and a Teaching Assistant at Stanford.

== Public service ==
=== U.S. Senate (1988–2002) ===
Adelstein served for fifteen years as a staff member in the United States Senate. During his final seven years on Capitol Hill, he served as a senior legislative aide to Senate Majority Leader Tom Daschle of South Dakota, advising him on technology, telecommunications, financial services, budget, housing, transportation and other key issues. Previously, he served as a legislative advisor to Senator David Pryor of Arkansas, and Senator Donald W. Riegle Jr. of Michigan.

=== Federal Communications Commission (2002–2009) ===
Adelstein was confirmed unanimously twice by the Senate to serve as Commissioner of the Federal Communications Commission (FCC) from 2002 to 2009. On the FCC, he sought to secure access to communications for everyone, including those left behind by the market. He fought for media diversity and localism, encouraging increased public access to the media to support free expression and a well-informed citizenry.

=== U.S. Department of Agriculture (2009–2012) ===
Adelstein was nominated by President Barack Obama and unanimously confirmed by the U.S. Senate in July 2009 to serve as the 17th Administrator of the USDA Rural Utilities Service ("RUS"). He served in the post until 2012.

As RUS Administrator, he oversaw a $60 billion portfolio of rural electric, water and telecommunications infrastructure loans. As part of the American Recovery and Reinvestment Act of 2009, he led the investment of $3.5 billion in rural broadband expansion to create jobs and provide new or improved broadband service to seven million residents, businesses and community facilities. He managed the investment of over $3 billion in loans and grants in to repair and upgrade rural water and waste systems. He led RUS's $6 billion rural electric program to modernize the electric grid, and expanded investments in renewable energy, energy efficiency and smart grid.

=== White House Councils ===
As a member of the Obama Administration, Adelstein was appointed as a member of the White House National Science and Technology Council, which coordinates science and technology policy across the federal government, and the White House Business Council, leading Council meetings with business leaders across America.

== Personal life ==
Adelstein is the son of Stan Adelstein.
