= Broadband =

Data transmission concept

Fixed broadband subscriptions (per 100 people)

In telecommunications, broadband or high speed is the wide-bandwidth data transmission that uses signals at a wide spread of frequencies or several different simultaneous frequencies. It is used in fast Internet access where the transmission medium can be coaxial cable, optical fiber, wireless Internet (radio), twisted pair cable, or satellite.

Originally used to mean "using a wide-spread frequency" and for services that were analog at the lowest level, in the context of Internet access, "broadband" is now often used to mean any high-speed Internet access that is seemingly always "on" and is faster than dial-up access over traditional analog or ISDN PSTN services.

The ideal telecommunication network has the following characteristics: broadband, multi-media, multi-point, multi-rate and economical implementation for a diversity of services (multi-services). The Broadband Integrated Services Digital Network (B-ISDN) was planned to provide these characteristics. Asynchronous Transfer Mode (ATM) was promoted as a target technology for meeting these requirements.

== Overview ==
Different criteria for "broad" have been applied in different contexts and at different times. Its origin is in physics, acoustics, and radio systems engineering, where it had been used with a meaning similar to "wideband", or in the context of audio noise reduction systems, where it indicated a single-band rather than a multiple-audio-band system design of the compander. Later, with the advent of digital telecommunications, the term was mainly used for transmission over multiple channels. Whereas a passband signal is also modulated so that it occupies higher frequencies (compared to a baseband signal, which is bound to the lowest end of the spectrum, see line coding), it is still occupying a single channel. The key difference is that what is typically considered a broadband signal in this sense is a signal that occupies multiple (non-masking, orthogonal) passbands, thus allowing for much higher throughput over a single medium but with additional complexity in the transmitter/receiver circuitry.

The term became popularized through the 1990s as a marketing term for Internet access that was faster than dial-up access (dial-up being typically limited to a maximum of 56 kbit/s). This meaning is only distantly related to its original technical meaning.

Since 1999, broadband Internet access has been a factor in public policy. In that year, at the World Trade Organization Biannual Conference called "Financial Solutions to Digital Divide" in Seattle, the term "Meaningful Broadband" was introduced to the world leaders, leading to the activation of a movement to close the digital divide. Fundamental aspects of this movement are to suggest that the equitable distribution of broadband is a fundamental human right.

Personal computing facilitated easy access, manipulation, storage, and exchange of information, and required reliable data transmission. Communicating documents by images and the use of high-resolution graphics terminals provided a more natural and informative mode of human interaction than do voice and data alone. Video teleconferencing enhances group interaction at a distance. High-definition entertainment video improves the quality of pictures, but requires much higher transmission rates.

These new data transmission requirements may require new transmission means other than the present overcrowded radio spectrum. A modern telecommunications network (such as the broadband network) must provide all these different services (multi-services) to the user.

== Differences from old telephony ==
Conventional telephony communication used:

- the voice medium only,
- connected only two telephones per telephone call, and
- used circuits of fixed bit-rates.

Modern services can be:

- multimedia,
- multi-point, and
- multirate.

These aspects are examined individually in the following three sub-sections.

=== Multimedia ===
A multimedia call may communicate audio, data, still images, or full-motion video, or any combination of these media. Each medium has different demands for communication quality, such as:

- bandwidth requirement,
- signal latency within the network, and
- signal fidelity upon delivery by the network.

The information content of each medium may affect the information generated by other media. For example, voice could be transcribed into data via voice recognition, and data commands may control the way voice and video are presented. These interactions most often occur at the communication terminals, but may also occur within the network.

=== Multipoint ===
Traditional voice calls are predominantly two-party calls, requiring a point-to-point connection using only the voice medium. To access pictorial information in a remote database would require a point-to-point connection that sends low-bit-rate queries to the database and high-bit-rate video from the database. Entertainment video applications are largely point-to-multi-point connections, requiring one-way communication of full-motion video and audio from the program source to the viewers. Video teleconferencing involves connections among many parties, communicating voice, video, as well as data. Offering future services thus requires flexible management of the connection and media requests of a multipoint, multimedia communication call.

=== Multirate ===
A multirate service network is one which flexibly allocates transmission capacity to connections. A multimedia network has to support a broad range of bit-rates demanded by connections, not only because there are many communication media, but also because a communication medium may be encoded by algorithms with different bit-rates. For example, audio signals can be encoded with bit-rates ranging from less than 1 kbit/s to hundreds of kbit/s, using different encoding algorithms with a wide range of complexity and quality of audio reproduction. Similarly, full motion video signals may be encoded with bit-rates ranging from less than 1 Mbit/s to hundreds of Mbit/s. Thus a network transporting both video and audio signals may have to integrate traffic with a very broad range of bit-rates.

== A single network for multiple services ==
Traditionally, different telecommunications services were carried via separate networks: voice on the telephone network, data on computer networks such as local area networks, video teleconferencing on private corporate networks, and television on broadcast radio or cable networks.

These networks were largely engineered for a specific application and are not suited to other applications. For example, the traditional telephone network is too noisy and inefficient for bursty data communication. On the other hand, data networks that store and forward messages using computers had limited connectivity, usually did not have sufficient bandwidth for digitised voice and video signals, and suffered from unacceptable delays for the real-time signals. Television networks using radio or cables were largely broadcast networks with minimum switching facilities.

It was desirable to have a single network for providing all these communication services to achieve the economy of sharing. This economy motivates the general idea of an integrated services network. Integration avoids the need for many overlaying networks, which complicates network management and reduces flexibility in the introduction and evolution of services. This integration was made possible with advances in broadband technologies and high-speed information processing of the 1990s.

While multiple network structures were capable of supporting broadband services, an ever-increasing percentage of broadband and multiple-system operator (MSO) providers opted for fibre-optic network structures to support both present and future bandwidth requirements.

CATV (cable television), HDTV (high definition television), VoIP (voice over internet protocol), and broadband internet are some of the most common applications now being supported by fibre optic networks, in some cases directly to the home (FTTh – Fibre To The Home). These types of fibre optic networks incorporate a wide variety of products to support and distribute the signal from the central office to an optic node, and ultimately to the subscriber (end-user).

== Broadband technologies ==
=== Telecommunications ===
In telecommunications, a broadband signalling method is one that handles a wide band of frequencies. "Broadband" is a relative term, understood according to its context. The wider (or broader) the bandwidth of a channel, the greater the data-carrying capacity, given the same channel quality.

In radio, for example, a very narrow band will carry Morse code, a broader band will carry speech, and a still broader band will carry music without losing the high audio frequencies required for realistic sound reproduction. This broad band is often divided into channels or frequency bins using passband techniques to allow frequency-division multiplexing instead of sending a higher-quality signal.

In data communications, a 56k modem will transmit a data rate of 56 kilobits per second (kbit/s) over a 4-kilohertz-wide telephone line (narrowband or voiceband). In the late 1980s, the Broadband Integrated Services Digital Network (B-ISDN) used the term to refer to a broad range of bit rates, independent of physical modulation details. The various forms of digital subscriber line (DSL) services are broadband in the sense that digital information is sent over multiple channels. Each channel is at a higher frequency than the baseband voice channel, so it can support plain old telephone service on a single pair of wires at the same time. However, when that same line is converted to a non-loaded twisted-pair wire (no telephone filters), it becomes hundreds of kilohertz wide (broadband) and can carry up to 100 megabits per second using very high-bit rate digital subscriber line (VDSL or VHDSL) techniques.

Modern networks have to carry integrated traffic consisting of voice, video and data. The Broadband Integrated Services Digital Network (B-ISDN) was designed for these needs. The types of traffic supported by a broadband network can be classified according to three characteristics:

- Bandwidth is the amount of network capacity required to support a connection.
- Latency is the amount of delay associated with a connection. Requesting low latency in the quality of service (QoS) profile means that the cells need to travel quickly from one point in the network to another.
- Cell-delay variation (CDV) is the range of delays experienced by each group of associated cells. Low cell-delay variation means a group of cells must travel through the network without getting too far apart from one another.

Cellular networks utilize various standards for data transmission, including 5G, which can support one million separate devices per square kilometer.

=== Requirements of the types of traffic ===
The types of traffic found in a broadband network (with examples) and their respective requirements are summarised in Table 1.

Table 1: Network traffic types and their requirements
| Traffic type | Example | Required bandwidth | Cell-delay | Latency |
|---|---|---|---|---|
| Constant | Voice, guaranteed circuit emulation | Minimal | Low | |
| Variable | Compressed video | Guaranteed | Variable | Low |
| Available | Data | Not guaranteed | Widely variable | Variable |

=== Computer networks ===
Many computer networks use a simple line code to transmit one type of signal using a medium's full bandwidth using its baseband (from zero through the highest frequency needed). Most versions of the popular Ethernet family are given names, such as the original 1980s 10BASE5, to indicate this. Networks that use cable modems on standard cable television infrastructure are called broadband to indicate the wide range of frequencies that can include multiple data users as well as traditional television channels on the same cable. Broadband systems usually use a different radio frequency modulated by the data signal for each band.

The total bandwidth of the medium is larger than the bandwidth of any channel.

The 10BROAD36 broadband variant of Ethernet was standardized by 1985, but was not commercially successful.

The DOCSIS standard became available to consumers in the late 1990s to provide Internet access to cable television residential customers. Matters were further confused by the fact that the 10PASS-TS standard for Ethernet ratified in 2008 used DSL technology, and both cable and DSL modems often have Ethernet connectors on them.

=== TV and video ===
A television antenna may be described as "broadband" because it is capable of receiving a wide range of channels, while e.g. a low-VHF antenna is "narrowband" since it receives only 1 to 5 channels. The U.S. federal standard FS-1037C defines "broadband" as a synonym for wideband. "Broadband" in analog video distribution is traditionally used to refer to systems such as cable television, where the individual channels are modulated on carriers at fixed frequencies. In this context, baseband is the term's antonym, referring to a single channel of analog video, typically in composite form with separate baseband audio. The act of demodulating converts broadband video to baseband video. Fiber optic allows the signal to be transmitted farther without being repeated. Cable companies use a hybrid system using fiber to transmit the signal to neighborhoods and then changes the signal from light to radio frequency to be transmitted over coaxial cable to homes. Doing so reduces the need for multiple head ends. A head end gathers all the information from the local cable networks and movie channels and then feeds the information into the system.

However, "broadband video" in the context of streaming Internet video has come to mean video files that have bit-rates high enough to require broadband Internet access for viewing. "Broadband video" is also sometimes used to describe IPTV Video on demand.

=== Alternative technologies ===
Power lines have also been used for various types of data communication. Although some systems for remote control are based on narrowband signaling, modern high-speed systems use broadband signaling to achieve very high data rates. One example is the ITU-T G.hn standard, which provides a way to create a local area network up to 1 Gigabit/s (which is considered high-speed as of 2014) using existing home business and home wiring (including power lines, but also phone lines and coaxial cables).

In 2014, researchers at Korea Advanced Institute of Science and Technology made developments on the creation of ultra-shallow broadband optical instruments.

== Internet broadband ==
In the context of Internet access, the term "broadband" is used loosely to mean "access that is always on and faster than the traditional dial-up access".

A range of more precise definitions of speed have been prescribed at times, including:

- "Greater than the primary rate" (which ranged from about 1.5 to 2 Mbit/s) —CCITT in "broadband service" in 1988.
- "Internet access that is always on and faster than the traditional dial-up access" —US National Broadband Plan of 2009
- 4 Mbit/s downstream, 1 Mbit/s upstream —Federal Communications Commission (FCC), 2010
- 25 Mbit/s downstream, 3 Mbit/s upstream —FCC, 2015
- 50 Mbit/s downstream, 10 Mbit/s upstream —Canadian Radio-television and Telecommunications Commission (CRTC)
- 100 Mbit/s downstream, 20 Mbit/s upstream —FCC, 2024

Broadband Internet service in the United States was effectively treated or managed as a public utility by net neutrality rules until being overturned by the FCC in December 2017.

=== Speed qualifiers ===
A number of national and international regulators categorize broadband connections according to upload and download speeds, stated in Mbit/s (megabits per second).

| Term | Regulator(s) | Minimal download speed (Mbit/s) | Minimal upload speed (Mbit/s) |
|---|---|---|---|
| Full fibre / FTTP/H | Ofcom | 100 | 1 |
| Gigabit | EU | 1000 | 1 |
| Ultrafast | Ofcom | 300 | 1 |
| Ultra-fast / Gfast | EU, UK Government | 100 | 1 |
| Fast | EU | 30 | |
| Superfast | Ofcom | 30 | 1 |
| Superfast | UK Government | 24 | 1 |
| Broadband | FCC | 100 | 20 |
| Broadband | Ofcom | 10 | 1 |
| Broadband | CRTC | 50 | 10 |

In Australia, the Australian Competition and Consumer Commission also requires Internet service providers to quote speed during nighttime and busy hours.

=== Global bandwidth concentration ===
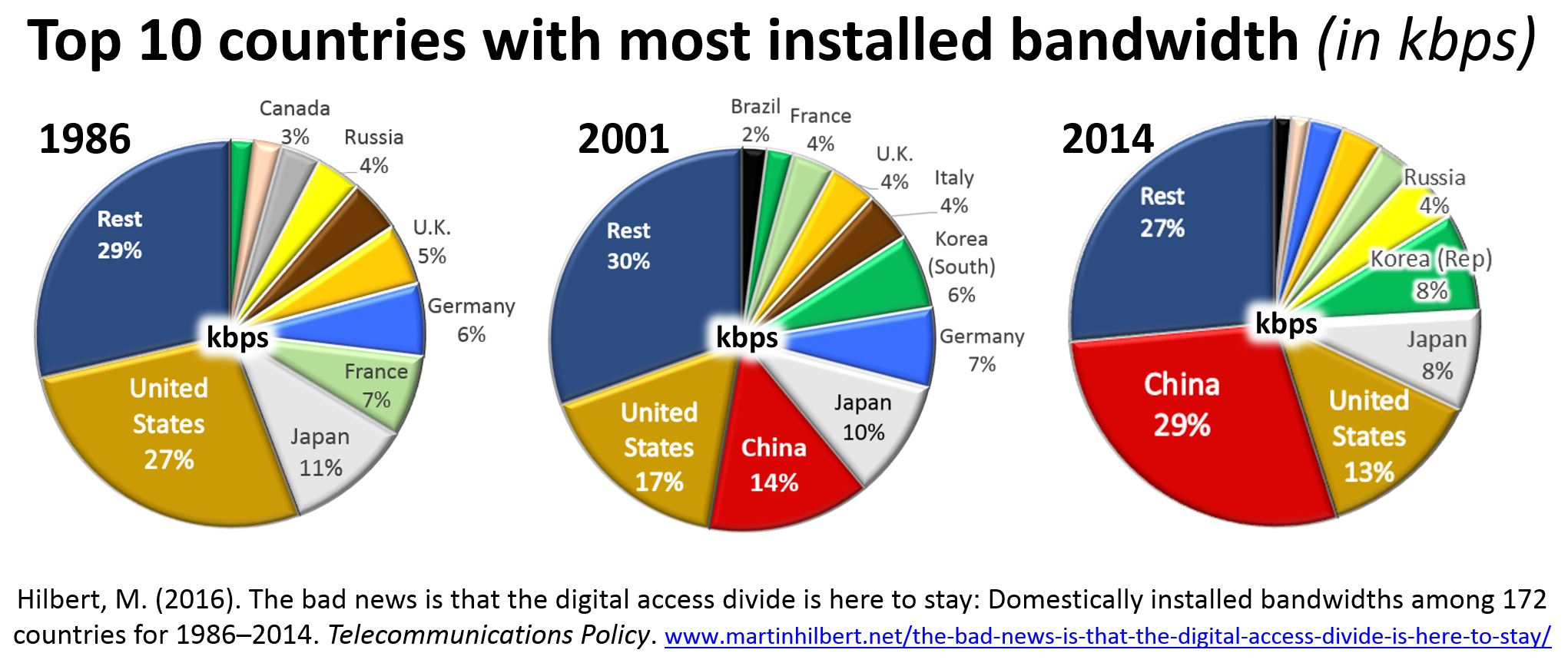
Global bandwidth concentration: 3 countries have almost 50% between them; 10 countries almost 75%.

Bandwidth has historically been very unequally distributed worldwide, with increasing concentration in the digital age. Historically only 10 countries have hosted 70–75% of the global telecommunication capacity (see pie-chart Figure on the right). In 2014, only three countries (China, the US, and Japan) host 50% of the globally installed telecommunication bandwidth potential. The U.S. lost its global leadership in terms of installed bandwidth in 2011, being replaced by China, which hosts more than twice as much national bandwidth potential in 2014 (29% versus 13% of the global total).

== See also ==
- Mobile broadband
- Ultra-wideband
- Wireless broadband

Nation specific:

- Broadband mapping in the United States
- Internet in Malaysia
- Internet in the United Kingdom
- List of broadband providers in the United States
- National broadband plan
