= Captive customer =

A captive customer is a marketing and regulatory concept, describing a buyer or user that is unable or unwilling to change the provider of goods or services due to high switching costs, provider being a natural monopoly, or some other circumstances that preclude substitution. This leads to a situation where the provider has the pricing power.

In service marketing, the concept extends beyond structural constraints to include the consumer's psychological perception of entrapment, characterized by a "triad": the lack of choice, voice, and power. While firms may view captive customers as a source of stable revenue, research indicates that captivity can lead to negative consumer well-being and retaliatory behaviors such as negative word-of-mouth.

A classic 19th-early 20th century example is a major originator of transit, e.g., a mine or granary located at the end of a railroad spur line, where the carrier could name its own tariffs. Other examples are offered by the suppliers of the natural gas and water (although in the latter case it is possible, at least in theory, drill one's own well). For example, US courts have long held that for the gas industry, a captive customer is the one "who must use gas and can only obtain it from one provider".

== Regulation ==
From a regulatory standpoint, the producer's pricing power is considered undesirable. Technological and economic changes, like introduction of the long-distance trucking and emergence of airlines helped alleviate some problems with captive customers. Large enterprises, facing the captive customer situation with utilities, can provide their own supplies of electricity and heat (cogeneration facilities), communication networks, natural gas supply deals. However, provision of core services (gas, electricity, basic communications) for residential and small business customers remains an issue and is therefore regulated.

The public utility customers are typically captive. For example, Federal Energy Regulatory Commission explicitly defined captive customers as "wholesale or retail electric energy customers served under cost-based regulation".

== Economics ==
In industrial economics, captive customers are often analyzed in the context of switching costs and price discrimination.

=== Switching costs ===
Captivity is frequently generated by switching costs, which render a firm's current market share a critical determinant of future profitability. These costs can be physical (equipment compatibility), transactional (closing accounts), informational (learning new systems), or psychological (brand loyalty). When consumers face high switching costs, firms may engage in a harvesting strategy, charging high prices to exploit their locked-in ("captive") customer base, distinct from the low prices used to attract new "shoppers".

=== Price discrimination ===
Firms often possess the ability to distinguish between captive customers (who consider only one seller) and "shoppers" (who compare prices across sellers). Economic models suggest that price discrimination against captive customers—charging them higher prices than shoppers—generally harms overall consumer welfare when competing firms are symmetric (i.e., they have similar shares of captive customers). In this scenario, discrimination widens the variation of profit across consumers, which is harmful if consumer surplus is a concave function of profit. However, in highly asymmetric markets, where one firm dominates, permitting price discrimination can potentially benefit consumers by intensifying competition for the non-captive segment.

== Service marketing ==
In the field of service marketing, captivity is viewed not just as a market structure but as a subjective psychological state known as service captivity.

=== Service captivity framework ===
Service captivity is defined by the consumer's perception of having limited options to exit a service relationship due to financial, social, psychological, or legal costs. Researchers have conceptualized this state through a "triad of captivity":

- No Choice: The consumer perceives no viable alternatives to the current provider.
- No Voice: The consumer feels unable to effectively complain or influence the service delivery.
- No Power: The consumer experiences a power imbalance favoring the provider, leading to feelings of dependency and vulnerability.

This framework identifies various archetypes of captivity beyond simple monopolies, including social captivity (staying due to social norms), contractual captivity (legal penalties for exit), and survival captivity (dependence on essential social services).

=== Divergent loyalty behaviors ===
Captive customers often exhibit divergent loyalty behaviors, where they display high retention rates (continuing to purchase) while simultaneously holding negative attitudes and engaging in damaging behaviors. This phenomenon is termed captive loyalty or spurious loyalty, distinguishing it from true loyalty driven by satisfaction. Research indicates that while switching costs may force a customer to stay, they do not prevent the customer from engaging in "company-focused sabotage" via negative word-of-mouth (NWOM).

=== Consequences and coping ===
Captivity is associated with negative consumer well-being, including emotions of anger, resignation, and feeling held hostage. Because captive customers cannot vote with their feet (exit), they often resort to negative word-of-mouth (NWOM) as a coping mechanism. In this context, NWOM serves an emotional support-seeking function, allowing the customer to regain a sense of social control and vent frustration, even if they cannot punish the firm financially.

== Sources ==
- Armstrong, Mark; Vickers, John (October 2018). "Discriminating Against Captive Customers". MPRA Paper No. 89284. Munich Personal RePEc Archive.
- FERC Statutes & Regulations. FERC Statutes & Regulations. Federal Energy Regulatory Commission. 1979.
- Furrer, Olivier; Yu Kerguignas, Jie; Landry, Mikèle (2021). "Customer captivity, negative word of mouth and well-being: a mixed-methods study". Journal of Services Marketing. 35 (6): 755–773. doi:10.1108/JSM-07-2020-0311.
- Harrison, J.L.; Morgan, T.D.; Verkuil, P.R. (2004). Regulation and Deregulation: Cases and Materials. American Casebook Series. Thomson/West. ISBN 978-0-314-14396-9.
- Jones, Douglas N. (1988). "Regulatory Concepts, Propositions, and Doctrines: Casualties and Survivors". Journal of Economic Issues. 22 (4): 1089–1108.
- Klemperer, Paul (1995). "Competition when Consumers have Switching Costs: An Overview with Applications to Industrial Organization, Macroeconomics, and International Trade". The Review of Economic Studies. 62 (4): 515–539.
- Leisen Pollack, Birgit (2017). "The Divergent "Loyalty" Behaviors of a Captive Consumer". Services Marketing Quarterly. 38 (2): 74–87. doi:10.1080/15332969.2017.1289788.
- Rayburn, Steven W.; Mason, Marlys J.; Volkers, Maarten (2020). "Service Captivity: No Choice, No Voice, No Power". Journal of Public Policy & Marketing. 39 (2): 155–168. doi:10.1177/0743915619899082.
- Rowe, W. Glenn; Barnes, James G. (1998). "Relationship Marketing and Sustained Competitive Advantage" (PDF). Journal of Market-focused Management. 2 (3): 281–297. doi:10.1023/A:1009707818053.
