= Regulatory agency =

Type of government institution

A regulatory agency (regulatory body, regulator) or independent agency (independent regulatory agency) is a government authority that is responsible for exercising autonomous jurisdiction over some area of human activity in a licensing and regulating capacity. Examples of responsibilities include strengthening safety and standards, and/or to protect consumers in markets where there is a lack of effective competition. Examples of regulatory agencies that enforce standards include the Food and Drug Administration in the United States and the Medicines and Healthcare products Regulatory Agency in the United Kingdom; and, in the case of economic regulation, the Office of Gas and Electricity Markets and the Telecom Regulatory Authority in India.

== Legislative basis ==
Regulatory agencies deal in the areas of administrative law, regulatory law, secondary legislation, and rulemaking (codifying and enforcing rules and regulations, and imposing supervision or oversight for the benefit of the public at large). The existence of independent regulatory agencies is justified by the complexity of certain regulatory and directorial tasks, and the drawbacks of political interference. Some independent regulatory agencies perform investigations or audits, and other may fine the relevant parties and order certain measures. In a number of cases, in order for a company or organization to enter an industry, it must obtain a license to operate from the sector regulator. This license will set out the conditions by which the companies or organizations operating within the industry must abide. Regulatory agency actions are often open to legal review.

Some regulatory bodies are not statutory agencies, examples include quangos, industry-led initiatives, or 'voluntary organisations'. They may be not-for-profit organisations or limited companies. They derive their authority from members' commitments to abide by the standards applied by the regulator, for instance as the UK's Advertising Standards Authority says "The self-regulation system works because it is powered and driven by a sense of corporate social responsibility amongst the advertising industry."

== Functioning ==
Regulatory regimes vary by country and industry and by the degree of their involvement in organisations' actions, for example there are "light-touch" or "proportionate" forms of regulation. Regulatory agencies are typically charged with overseeing a defined industry. Usually they will have two general tasks:

- creating, reviewing and amending standards expected of individuals and organisations within the industry, and
- intervening when there is a reasonable suspicion that a regulated individual/organisation may not be complying with its obligations. Under such an intervention regime, regulatory agencies typically have powers to:
  - oblige individuals or firms entering the industry to obtain a license;
  - require transparency of information and decision-making on part of the regulated company; and
  - monitor the performance and investigate the compliance of the regulated company, with the regulator publishing the findings of its investigations.

In the event that the regulated company is not in compliance with its license obligations or the law, the regulatory agency may be empowered to:

- require that administrators of the regulated company explain their actions;
- undertake enforcement action, such as directing the regulated company to comply through orders, imposing financial penalties and/or revoking its license to operate; or
- refer the regulated company to a competition authority, in instances where it may have breached competition law, or prosecute the company (via civil courts).

In some instances, it is deemed in the public interest (by the legislative branch of government) for regulatory agencies to be given powers in addition to the above. This more interventionist form of regulation is common in the provision of public utilities, which are subject to economic regulation. In this case, regulatory agencies have powers to:

- require the provision of particular outputs and/or service levels; and
- set price controls or a rate-of-return for the regulated company.

The functions of regulatory agencies in prolong "collaborative governance" provide for generally non-adversarial regulation. Ex post actions taken by regulatory agencies can be more adversarial and involve sanctions, influencing rulemaking, and creating quasi-common law. However, the roles of regulatory agencies as "regulatory monitors" provide a vital function in administering law and ensuring compliance.

== Areas ==
Areas subject to regulatory agencies include:

- Advertising regulation
- Alcoholic beverages
- Bank regulation
- Consumer protection
- Cyber-security regulation
- Economic regulation
- Environmental regulation
- Financial regulation
- Food safety and food security
- Noise regulation
- Nuclear safety
- Minerals
- Occupational safety and health
- Public health
- Regulation and monitoring of pollution
- Regulation of acupuncture
- Regulation of nanotechnology
- Regulation of sport
- Regulation of therapeutic goods
- Regulation through litigation
- Vehicle regulation
- Regulation of ship pollution in the United States
- Regulation and prevalence of homeopathy
- Regulation of science
- Wage regulation

== By country or international organization ==
Regulatory agencies include:

- Agencies of the European Union
- List of regulators in India
- Independent regulatory agencies in Turkey
- Independent agencies of the United States federal government
- List of regulators in the United Kingdom

== See also ==
- Civil service commission
- Code of Federal Regulations
- Constitutional economics
- Constitutional institution
- Deregulation
- Election management body
- International regulation
- Impersonating a public servant
- Journal of Regulatory Economics
- Law enforcement agency
- Liberalization
- Public administration
- Public utilities commission
- Quasi-judicial body
- Regulation school
- Regulatory capture
- Regulatory compliance
- Regulatory economics
- Revolving door

== Notes ==
- Jordana J, Fernández-i-Marín X, Bianculli A (2018). "Agency proliferation and the globalization of the regulatory state: Introducing a data set on the institutional features of regulatory agencies". Regulation & Governance. 12 (4): 524–540. doi:10.1111/rego.12189. hdl:10230/46637.
- Kohlmeier, Louis M. Jr. (1969). The Regulators: Watchdog Agencies and the Public Interest. New York: Harper & Row. ISBN 978-0-06-043747-3.
- Quirk, Paul J. (2014). Industry Influence in Federal Regulatory Agencies. Princeton, NJ: Princeton University Press. ISBN 9781400854318.
