= Ethics committee =

Committee overseeing the conduct of medical research and other human experimentation

An ethics committee is a body responsible for ensuring that medical experimentation and human subject research are carried out in an ethical manner in accordance with national and international law.

== By jurisdiction ==
=== European Union ===
An ethics committee in the European Union is a body responsible for oversight of medical or human research studies in EU member states. Local terms for a European ethics committee include:

- A Research Ethics Committee (REC) in the United Kingdom
- A Medical Research Ethics Committee (MREC) in the Netherlands.
- A Comité de Protection des Personnes (CPP) in France.

=== United States ===
In the United States, an ethics committee is usually known as an institutional review board (IRB) or research ethics board (REB) and is dedicated to overseeing the rights and well-being of research subjects participating in scientific studies in the US. Similarly in Canada, the committee is called a Research Ethics Board (REB).

=== Australia ===
In Australia, an ethics committee in medical research refers to a Human Research Ethics Committee (HREC).

=== New Zealand ===
Aotearoa New Zealand's ethics committee is Kāhui Matatika o te Motu, also known as the National Ethics Advisory Committee (NEAC). They outline the standards for ethical and health research, which are used by the Health and Disability Ethics Committee (HDEC) to assess research and services related to health and disability.

=== Canada ===
Since 1977 for the purposes of its subsidies to university research the Government of Canada, under the GOSA Act in the person (since 2015) of its Minister of Innovation, Science and Industry, donates annually to several of the federal funder agencies; these in turn disburse the funds into person-sized chunks. These persons typically are university professors, who are selected according to success in the wielding of soft power as measured by track record. In Canada, the Interagency Advisory Panel on Research Ethics (IAPRE) promotes "the ethical conduct of research involving human participants" under a document sometimes referred to as TCPS2. The panel was jointly started in 2001 by three of the federal university research-funding agencies CIHR, NSERC, and SSHRC. The IAPRE FAQ says that "Failure to comply with the requirements of the TCPS2 by researchers or their institution may result in a recourse by the Agencies." Other organizations have opted to adhere to the TCPS2, for example the National Research Council Canada, the Department of National Defence and Health Canada. The IAPRE maintains that some private REBs have opted to adhere to TCPS2 as well. It is worthwhile to note that not all research in Canada is dependent on federal funds.

== History ==
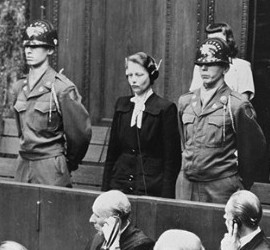
Nazi physician Herta Oberheuser during sentencing in Nuremberg. She was found guilty of performing medical experiments on concentration camp inmates and sentenced to 20 years in prison.

One of the most fundamental ethical principles in human experimentation is that the experimenter should not subject the participants in the experiment to any procedure they would not be willing to undertake themselves. This idea was first codified in the Nuremberg Code in 1947, which was a result of the trials of Nazi doctors at the Nuremberg trials accused of murdering and torturing victims in valueless experiments. Several of these doctors were hanged. Point five of the Nuremberg Code requires that no experiment should be conducted that is dangerous to the subjects unless the experimenters themselves also take part. The Nuremberg Code has influenced medical experiment codes of practice around the world, as has the exposure of experiments that have since failed to follow it such as the notorious Tuskegee syphilis experiment.

Another ethical principle is that volunteers must stand to gain some benefit from the research, even if that is only a remote future possibility of treatment being found for a disease that they only have a small chance of contracting. Tests on experimental drugs are sometimes conducted on sufferers of an untreatable condition. If the researcher does not have that condition then there can be no possible benefit to them personally. For instance, Ronald C. Desrosiers in responding to why he did not test an AIDS vaccine he was developing on himself said that he was not at risk of AIDS so could not possibly benefit.

An important element of an ethics committee's oversight is to ensure that informed consent of the subjects has been given. Informed consent is the principle that the volunteers in the experiment should fully understand the procedure that is going to take place, be aware of all the risks involved, and give their consent to taking part in the experiment beforehand. The principle of informed consent was first enacted in the U.S. Army's research into Yellow fever in Cuba in 1901. However, there was no general or official guidance at this time. That remained the case until the yellow fever program was referenced in the drafting of the Nuremberg Code. This was further developed in the Declaration of Helsinki in 1964 by the World Medical Association which has since become the foundation for ethics committees' guidelines.

The convening of ethics committees to approve the research protocol in human experiments was first written into international guidelines in the first revision to the Declaration of Helsinki (Helsinki II, 1975). A controversy arose over the fourth revision (1996) concerning placebo trials in developing countries. It was claimed that US trials of the anti-HIV drug zidovudine in India was in breach of this requirement. This led the US Food and Drug Administration to cease incorporating new revisions of Helsinki and refer instead to the 1989 revision.

Ethics committees are also made a requirement in International Ethical Guidelines for Biomedical Research Involving Human Subjects, produced by the Council for International Organizations of Medical Sciences (CIOMS), a body set up by the World Health Organization. First published in 1993, the CIOMS guidelines have no legal force but they have been influential in the drafting of national regulations for ethics committees. The COIMS guidelines are focused on practice in developing countries.

== Criticism ==
Ethics committees have been criticized of inconsistency, over-regulation, lack of accountability, prioritizing institutional reputation over academic freedom, and reducing innovation. In case of social sciences one article considers ethical regulation unethical due to higher damage to democratic society than potential damage to research subjects. In 2026, a debate started in the Journal of Empirical Research on Human Research Ethics. that current ethics approval systems for medical research, paradoxically result in preventable deaths by delaying patient access to experimental therapies. The initial article reviewed peer-reviewed evidence that demonstrates that ethics delays impose mortality costs that vastly exceed the harms they prevent, particularly for terminal illnesses. Subsequent responses by Steel (largely in agreement with the criticism) and to Tsan (defending the status quo) were evaluated by Pearce concluding "...IRB delays result in more human mortality than they protect. The current system is not logically defensible, and it is long past time that we fixed it."

== See also ==
- Guidelines for human subject research
- Regulation of science
- Corporate ethics committee

== Bibliography ==
- Lawrence K. Altman, Who Goes First?: The Story of Self-experimentation in Medicine, University of California Press, 1987 ISBN 0520212819.
- S. C. Gandevia, "Self-experimentation, ethics, and efficacy", Monash Bioethics Review (Ethics Committee Supplement), vol. 23, no. 4, 2005.
- Povl Riis, "Planning of scientific-ethical committees", British Medical Journal, vol. 2, pp. 173–174, 1977.
- Emily A. Largent, "Recently proposed changes to legal and ethical guidelines governing human subjects research", Journal of Law and the Biosciences, vol. 3, iss. 1, pp. 206–216.
- R. J. Levine, "Some recent developments in the international guidelines on the ethics of research involving human subjects", Annals of the New York Academy of Sciences, vol. 918, pp. 170–178, November 2000.
- Robert V Carlson, Kenneth M. Boyd, David J Webb, "The revision of the Declaration of Helsinki: past, present and future", British Journal of Clinical Pharmacology, vol. 57, iss. 6, pp. 695–713, June 2004.
