= Block model =

Block model may refer to:

- Blockmodeling, in network science
- Building block model, a form of public utility regulation in Australia
- Resource block model, in mineral resource estimation
