= Gold plating (disambiguation) =

Gold plating is the act of depositing a thin layer of gold on the surface of other metals in the modern electronics industry

Gold plating may also refer to:

- Gilding, various traditional methods of depositing a thin layer of gold on the surface of other materials in goldsmithing, jewellery, furniture etc.
- Gold-plating (European Union law), the practise of national bodies exceeding the terms of European Union directives when implementing them into national law
- Gold plating (project management), the act of adding unneeded enhancements to a product or service to inflate the final cost to its buyer and the associated profit realized by its producer
- The Averch-Johnson effect, the tendency of regulated companies to engage in excessive amounts of capital accumulation in order to expand the volume of their profits, colloquially referred to as gold plating
