= Revenue-cap regulation =

Form of utility regulation limiting total revenue

Revenue-cap regulation is a form of economic regulation in which the regulator of a public utility, typically a natural monopoly such as an electricity network, sets a limit on the total revenue the operator may collect, rather than regulating its prices or profits directly. The cap is adjusted over time for inflation and for the efficiency gains the regulator expects of the operator, so the operator keeps savings it achieves beyond the required rate. Price-cap regulation works in the same way but constrains prices rather than revenue.

== Rationale ==
The cap is intended to give the operator an incentive to improve its efficiency, and it dampens the effect of the operator knowing more about its own costs than the regulator does. Revenue is typically allowed to grow with inflation less a productivity offset, commonly called the X-factor. The underlying logic is that the cap emulates a competitive market, in which prices reflect production costs and decline as productivity improves.

== Revenue cap index ==
The operator is free to move individual prices within a basket of services, provided total revenue stays within the index. Three things go into that index: general inflation in the economy, how fast the operator's own input prices rise compared with the average firm, and how much room the operator has to raise productivity compared with the average firm.

The last two components are what the X-factor exists to carry. An operator whose input costs climb faster than general inflation needs revenue to grow faster than inflation merely to cover its cost of capital. An operator that can lift productivity faster than the average firm needs less. The X-factor is the net of those two differences, which is why the cap is written as inflation minus X.

Which inflation index the regulator picks therefore decides how much work the X-factor has to do. A broad measure such as a gross national product price index leaves the X-factor to absorb both the input-price difference and the productivity difference. A retail or producer price index narrows it to the difference against that sector. An index built from the operator's own input prices handles the input-price side already, so the X-factor then reflects productivity alone.

== Comparison with price-cap regulation ==
Revenue cap regulation is more appropriate than price cap regulation when costs do not vary appreciably with units of sales.

== Norway ==
Norway has used revenue caps to regulate its electricity network companies since 1997, replacing an earlier rate-of-return regime that gave the companies little incentive to reduce costs. The Norwegian Energy Regulatory Authority (RME), part of the Norwegian Water Resources and Energy Directorate, sets an annual revenue cap for each grid company, as electricity transmission and distribution is a natural monopoly.

Since 2007 the caps have been set with a yardstick model that combines each company's own costs with a cost norm, estimated by benchmarking the company against comparable network operators using data envelopment analysis. The cost norm carries a weight of 70 percent and the company's own costs, measured with a two-year lag, 30 percent; the norm's weight was 60 percent until 2023. The cost of energy not supplied (CENS), a measure of the value of lost load for customers, is deducted from the allowed revenue, giving the companies an incentive to maintain the quality of supply. The intention is that grid companies find cost-effective ways of meeting their obligations, since a regulated monopoly whose costs were automatically covered would not necessarily operate cost-effectively.
