= Building block =

Building block or building blocks may refer to:

- Building block (chemistry), a term in chemistry which is used to describe a virtual molecular fragment or a real chemical compound the molecules of which possess reactive functional groups
- Building blocks (toy), modular construction parts, usually made of plastic, which can be assembled in a form-fit manner
- Building block model, a form of public utility regulation that is common in Australia
- Concrete block, a standard-size rectangular block used in building construction
- Toy block, a wooden, plastic, or foam piece of various shapes and colors that is used as a construction toy
