= Price-cap regulation =

Form of market regulation

Price-cap regulation is a form of incentive regulation capping the prices that firms in a natural monopoly position may charge their customers. Designed in the 1980s by UK Treasury economist Stephen Littlechild, it has been applied to all privatised British network utilities. It is contrasted with both rate-of-return regulation, with utilities being permitted a set rate of return on capital, and with revenue-cap regulation, with total revenue being the regulated variable.

== Functioning ==
Price-cap regulation adjusts the operator's prices according to

- the price cap index that reflects the overall rate of inflation in the economy,
- the ability of the operator to gain efficiencies relative to the average firm in the economy, and
- the inflation in the operator's input prices relative to the average firm in the economy.

Revenue cap regulation attempts to do the same thing but for revenue, rather than prices.

Price-cap regulation is sometimes called "CPI - X", (in the United Kingdom "RPI-X") after the basic formula employed to set price caps. This takes the rate of inflation, measured by the Consumer Price Index (UK Retail Prices Index, RPI) and subtracts expected efficiency savings $X$. In the water industry, the formula is $RPI-X+K$, where $K$ is based on capital investment requirements.

The system is intended to provide incentives for efficiency savings, as any savings above the predicted rate $X$ can be passed on to shareholders, at least until the price caps are next reviewed (usually every five years). A key part of the system is that the rate $X$ is based not only a firm's past performance, but on the performance of other firms in the industry: $X$ is intended to be a proxy for a competitive market, in industries which are natural monopolies.

== Use ==
=== Energy ===
Notably, in 2018, the UK Government introduced a form of price cap regulation through a new cap for gas and electricity customers on standard variable tariffs. In August 2022, the energy price cap was raised to £3,549 which would have pushed 8.2 million people into fuel poverty in October 2022 until March 2023. However, in the event, as a political decision, the UK Government subsidised the supply of domestic electricity by reducing bills by £400 for each household, spread out over six months, and subsidising each unit of electricity as well.

=== Telecoms ===
Price-cap regulation is no longer a uniquely British form of regulation. Particularly in the telecommunications industry, many Asian countries are implementing some form of price cap on their newly privatised operators. In addition, many US local exchange carriers are regulated by price-cap rather than rate-of-return regulation: in 2003, of the 73 companies reporting to Federal Communications Commission Automated Reporting Management Information System (ARMIS) database, 22 were regulated according to an RPI-X price cap (and a further 35 were subject to other retail price controls). In Australia, the preferred form of price regulation for utilities is the CPI-X regime.

=== Airports ===
Many airports are local monopolies. To prevent them from abusing their market power, governments around the world regulate how much airports may charge to airlines. This price-cap regulation can follow a dual-till approach, in which the regulator considers aeronautical and non-aeronautical (commercial) revenue separately, or a single-till approach, in which the regulator considers all the airport's revenues when determining acceptable airport charges.

Under dual-till regulation, airports do not use profits derived from concession businesses to finance airport infrastructure, implying higher charges to airlines. The single-till approach typically leads to lower charges to airlines, which better controls airport market power.

== See also ==
- United Kingdom
  - Civil Aviation Authority (United Kingdom)
  - Ofcom
  - Ofgem
  - Office of Rail and Road
  - Ofwat
- Economic regulation
- Regulatory agency
