= Individual fishing quota =

Fishing regulation limiting people's allowances to fish

Individual fishing quotas (IFQs), also known as "individual transferable quotas" (ITQs), are one kind of catch share, a means by which many governments regulate fishing. The regulator sets a species-specific total allowable catch (TAC), typically by weight and for a given time period. A dedicated portion of the TAC, called quota shares, is then allocated to individuals. Quotas can typically be bought, sold and leased, a feature called transferability. As of 2008, 148 major fisheries (generally, a single species in a single fishing ground) around the world had adopted some variant of this approach, along with approximately 100 smaller fisheries in individual countries. Approximately 10% of the marine harvest was managed by ITQs as of 2008. The first countries to adopt individual fishing quotas were the Netherlands, Iceland and Canada in the late 1970s, and the most recent is the United States Scallop General Category IFQ Program in 2010. The first country to adopt individual transferable quotas as a national policy was New Zealand in 1986.

== Command and control approaches ==
Historically, inshore and deepwater fisheries were in common ownership where no one had a property right to the fish (i.e., owned them) until after they had been caught. Each boat faced the zero-sum game imperative of catching as many fish as possible, knowing that any fish they did not catch would likely be taken by another boat.

Commercial fishing evolved from subsistence fishing with no restrictions that would limit or direct the catch. The implicit assumption was that the ocean's bounty was so vast that restrictions were unnecessary. In the 20th century, fisheries such as Atlantic cod and California sardines collapsed, and nations began to limit access to their fishing grounds by boats from other countries, while in parallel, international organizations began to certify that specific species were "threatened", "endangered", etc.

One early management technique was to define a "season" during which fishing was allowed. The length of the season attempted to reflect the current abundance of the fishery, with bigger populations supporting longer seasons. This turned fishing into a race, driving the industry to bigger, faster boats, which in turn caused regulators to repetitively shorten seasons, sometimes to only a few days per year. Landing all boats over an ever-shorter interval also led to glut/shortage market cycles with prices crashing when the boats came in. A secondary consequence was that boats sometimes embarked when the fishery was "open" regardless of weather or other safety concerns.

== A move to privatisation and market-based mechanisms ==
The implementation of ITQs or IFQs works in tandem with the privatisation of common assets. This regulatory measure seeks to economically rationalise access to a common-pool resource. This type of management is based in the doctrine of natural resource economics. Notably the use of ITQs in environmental policy has been informed by the work of economists such as Jens Warming, H. Scott Gordon and Anthony Scott. It is theorised that the primary driver of over-fishing is the rule of capture externality. This is the idea that the fisherman does not have a property right to the resource until point of capture, encouraging competitive behaviour and overcapitalisation in the industry. It is theorised that without a long-term right to fish stocks, there is no incentive to conserve fish stocks for the future.

The use of ITQs in resource management dates back to the 1960s and was first seen in 'pollution quotas', which are now widely used to manage carbon emissions from power utilities. For both air and marine resources ITQs use a 'cap-and-trade' approach by setting typically annual limits on resource exploitation (TAC in fisheries) and then allowing trade of quotas between industry users. However, ITQ use in fisheries is fundamentally different from pollution quotas, since the latter regulate the by-product of an industry, whereas fishery ITQs regulate the actual output product of the fishing industry, and thus amount to exclusive industry participation rights.

The use of IFQs has often been related to broader processes within neoliberalism that tend to utilise markets as a regulatory tool. The rationale behind such neo-liberal mechanisms situates itself in the belief that market mechanisms harness profit motive to more innovative and efficient environmental solutions than those devised and executed by states. Whilst such neo-liberal regulation has often been cited as a move away from state governance, in the case of privatization the state is integral in the process of creating and maintaining property rights.

The use of neoliberal privatising regimes has also often raised contradictions with the rights of indigenous communities. For example, the exclusion of Māori tribes in the initial allocation of fishing quota in New Zealand's quota management system led to a lengthy legal battle delaying development in national fisheries policy and resulting in a large settlement from the crown. There have also been similar legal battles regarding the allocation of fishing rights with the Mi'kmaq in Canada and the Saami in North Norway. Aboriginal fishing rights are said to pose a challenge to the authoritative claims of the state as the final arbiters in respect of access and participation in rights-based regimes.

== Catch shares ==
The term catch share has been used more recently to describe the range of programmes similar to ITQs. Catch shares expanded the concept of daily catch limits to year-long limits, allowed different fishermen to have different limits based on various factors, and also limited the total catch.

Catch shares eliminate the "race to the fish" problem, because fishermen are no longer restricted to short fishing seasons and can schedule their voyages as they choose. Boom/bust market cycles disappear, because fishing can continue throughout a typically many-month season. Some safety problems are reduced because there's no need to fish in hazardous conditions just because the fishery happens to be open.

A crucial element of catch share systems is how to distribute/allocate the shares and what rights come with them. The initial allocation can be granted or auctioned. Shares can be held permanently ("owned") or for a fixed period such as one year ("rented"). They can be salable and/or leasable or not, with or without limits. Each variation has advantages and disadvantages, which may vary given the culture of a given fishing community.

=== Initial distribution ===
ITQs are typically initially allocated as grants according to the recent catch history of the fishery. Those with bigger catches are generally allocated larger quotas. The primary drawback is that individuals receive a valuable right at no cost. Grants are somewhat analogous to a "homestead", in which settlers who developed farms in the American wilderness eventually received title without payment to what had been public land. In some cases, less than 100% of the TAC becomes ITQs, with the remainder allocated to other management strategies.

The grant approach is inherently political, with attendant benefits and costs. For example, related industries such as fish processing and other non-participants may seek quota grants. Also, fishermen are often excluded from receiving quota if they are not also boat owners, however boat owners who do not fish do receive quota, such as was the case in Alaskan IFQ distributions. The offshore pollock co-operative in the Pacific Northwest allocated initial quotas by mutual agreement and allows quota holders to sell their quotas only to the co-operative members.

Quota auctions recompense the public for access to fisheries. They are somewhat analogous to the spectrum auctions that the U.S. held to allocate highly valuable radio spectrum. These auctions raised tens of billions of dollars for the public. The auction for crab quota in Russia in 2019 raised about 2 billion euro. Note however that the television industry did not have to pay for the necessary spectrum to switch from analog to digital broadcasting, which is more like quota grants for incumbent fishermen.

=== Trading ===
ITQs can be re-sold to those who want to increase their presence in the fishery. Alternatively, quotas can be non-tradeable, meaning that if a fisherman leaves the industry, the quota reverts to the government to retire or to grant/auction to another party.

Once distributed, quotas can be re-granted/re-auctioned periodically or held in perpetuity. Limiting the time period lowers the quota's value and its initial auction price/cost, but subsequent auctions create recurring revenues. At the same time, "privatising" such a public resource reduces the remaining amount of public resources and can be thought of as "giving away our future". In the industry, rented quotas are often referred to as "dedicated access privileges" (DAP).

Another issue with tradability is that large enterprises may buy all the quotas, ending what may be a centuries-long tradition of small-scale operations. This may benefit the sellers (and the buyers and those who buy the fish) but can potentially cause large changes in the culture of fishing communities. Consolidation of quota accompanies every IFQ programme, and typically works to phase out smaller, less profitable fishing operations in favour of larger, often corporate-owned fleets who have better financing capabilities.

Some fisheries require quota holders to be participating fishermen to prevent absentee ownership and limit the quota that a captain can accumulate. In the Alaska halibut and black cod fisheries, only active fishermen can buy quota, and new entrants may not sub-lease their quota. However, these measures have only served to mitigate outside speculation in IFQs by non-fishermen. A lack of regulatory policy or enforcement still results in the prevalence of "armchair fishermen" (those who own quota but do not materially participate in the fishery). Since IFQs began in 1995, the commercial longline fleet has never exceeded these fisheries' TACs.

=== Other characteristics ===
ITQs may have the effect of changing the criteria that fishermen apply to their catch. Highgrading involves catching more fish than the quota allows and dumping specimens that are less valuable because of size, age or other criteria. Many of the discarded fish are already dead or quickly die, increasing fishing's reduction of stocks.

== Effectiveness ==
In 2008 a large scale study concluded that ITQs can help to prevent collapses and restore declining fisheries when compared to a data set including 11,000 fisheries of various management structures (some entirely unmanaged). While nearly a third of open-access fisheries have collapsed, catch share fisheries are only half as likely to fail. However, when compared to other modern fishery management schemes, IFQ managed fisheries exhibit no long term ecological advantages. A study of the 14 IFQ programmes in the United States revealed that fish stocks are unaffected by these management schemes. In terms of productivity, a study that exploits a 2009 reform that introduced IFQ for Peruvian anchovy finds that quotas do not increase within-asset or within-firm productivity in quantities.

In 1995, the Alaskan halibut fishery converted to ITQs, after regulators cut the season from about four months down to two or three days. Today, due to the pre-allocation of catch that accompanies IFQs, the season lasts nearly eight months and boats deliver fresh fish at a steadier pace. However, halibut stocks have been in continuous decline for over a decade, as poor stock assessments leading to overfishing have caused a substantial decline in biomass. Additionally, despite the increase in landings value, the number of quota holders has declined by 44%, as consolidation and quota pricing has served to prevent new entrants.

Not all fisheries have thrived under ITQs, in some cases experiencing reduced or static biomass levels, because of factors such as:

- TACs may be set at too high a level
- Migratory species may be overfished in parts of their habitat not covered by the TAC
- Habitats may incur damage
- Enforcement may be lax

== Countries ==
=== Iceland ===
Iceland introduced a quota market for cod in 1984 and made those quotas transferable in 1990. Iceland became one of the first countries in the world to adopt a quota system to manage its marine resources.

The quota system is contentious in Icelandic politics. Critics of the quota system criticize the manner in which the quotas were initially distributed, arguing that the quotas should have been auctioned to the highest bidders. Critics have called for quotas to be gradually returned to the state, which can then auction the quotas to highest bidders. They argue that this would ensure that the state receives its fair share of the profits whereas the current system where the state taxes a share of the profits leads to suboptimal returns for the state. They also criticize the tendency of the market to result in consolidation of quotas.

Supporters say the initial distribution of the quotas to fishermen was fair, as they would have incurred the costs of the implementation of a quota system and thus deserved a share of the quota. Supporters also say that the current system has successfully ensured the sustainability of Icelandic fish stocks and led to prosperity.

Political parties such as the Independence Party, the Progressive Party and the Left-Greens largely support the current iteration of the quota system. Parties such as Social-Democratic Party and Viðreisn have called for a quota system that increasingly relies on auctions.

=== United States ===
The Magnuson-Stevens Fishery Conservation and Management Act defines individual transferable quotas (ITQs) as permits to harvest specific quantities of fish of a particular species. Fisheries scientists decide the maximum annual harvest in a certain fishery, accounting for carrying capacity, re-generation rates and future values. This amount is called the total allowable catch (TAC). Under ITQs, participants in a fishery receive rights to a portion of the TAC without charge. Quotas can be fished, bought, sold, or leased. Twenty-eight U.S. fisheries have adopted ITQs as of 2008. Concerns about distributional consequences led to a moratorium on moving other fisheries into the programme that lasted from 1996 to 2004.

Starting in January 2011, fishermen in California, Oregon and Washington will operate via tradeable catch shares. Fishermen have been discarding bycatch that is not their target, typically killing the individuals. Catch shares allow trawlers to exchange by-catch with each other, benefitting both. Goals of the system include increased productivity, reduced waste, and higher revenues for fishermen. More than a dozen other U.S. fisheries are now managed by catch shares. Fishery managers say that in Alaska, where catch shares have been in place for several years, fishermen are now achieving higher prices for their catch.

== Criticisms and controversies ==
=== Private control of public resource ===
IFQs are usually initiated through the de facto privatisation of an otherwise public resource: the fisheries. Initial recipients of quota receive windfall profits through the gifting of share ownership, while all future entrants are forced to purchase or lease the right to harvest fish. Many have questioned both the ethical and economic repercussions of dedicating a secure, exclusive privilege to access this public resource. For example, in the US, during a presentation given to the Gulf Fishery Management Council, Fishery Manager Larry Abele stated that the present value of the Gulf Fishery IFQ Harvest amounted to $345,000,000 and this was given without requiring of any return to the public from IFQ holders.

=== Quota consolidation ===
Virtually every IFQ programme results in substantial consolidation of quota. For example, it is estimated that eight companies control 80% of New Zealand's fisheries through quota acquisition, four companies control 77% of one Alaska crab fishery, and 7% of shareholders control 60% of the US Gulf Red Snapper quota. The consolidation results in job loss, reduced wages, and decreased entry opportunities into the fishery.

=== Leasing practices ===
Many IFQ systems involve the temporary transfer of fishing rights, whereby the owner of quota leases the fishing rights to active fishermen in exchange for a fixed percentage of the landed value of fish. Since quota acquisition is often beyond the financial means of many fishermen, they are forced to sacrifice substantial portions of their income in order to lease fishing rights. For example, Bering Sea crab lease fees can be as high as 80% of the landed value of the crab, meaning that the active fishermen only retain 20% of the revenue, much of which is needed to cover costs. In some fisheries, the majority of quota is leased to active fishermen, often by individuals who do not physically participate in the fishery, but have been able to acquire shares. This makes quota acquisition even less likely for active fishermen, results in diversion of wealth away from fishing communities and into the hands of private investors, and can cause major financial strain on fishermen along with the economic contraction of fishing communities.

=== Economic depression of coastal communities ===
The transition to IFQ management tends to cause considerable economic harm to coastal communities that are dependent on commercial fisheries. Although IFQ management systems are designed to enhance the economic performance of the fishing industry, this usually comes at the cost of coastal communities whose economies rely principally on their fishing fleet. This cost results from the re-equilibration of the quota-regime market, revealing the inefficient over-investment that had taken place in the industry prior to implementation of the quota regime.

== See also ==
- List of commercially important fish species
