= Regulatory economics =

Economics of regulation

Regulatory economics is the application of law by government or regulatory agencies for various economic purposes, including remedying market failure and protecting the environment.

Regulation is generally defined as legislation imposed by a government on individuals and private sector firms in order to regulate and modify economic behaviors. Not all types of regulation are government-mandated, so some professional industries and corporations choose to adopt self-regulating models.

Regulatory capture is a risk to which government agencies are exposed by their very nature.

== Theories of regulation ==
The art of regulation has long been studied, particularly in the utilities sector. Two ideas have been formed on regulatory policy: positive theories of regulation and normative theories of regulation.

The former examine why regulation occurs. These theories include theories of market power, "interest group theories that describe stakeholders' interests in regulation," and "theories of government opportunism that describe why restrictions on government discretion may be necessary for the sector to provide efficient services for customers." These theories conclude that regulation occurs because:

1. the government is interested in overcoming *information asymmetries and in aligning their own interest with the operator,
2. customers desire protection from market power in the presence of non-existent or ineffective competition,
3. operators desire protection from rivals, or
4. operators desire protection from government opportunism.

Normative economic theories of regulation generally conclude that regulators should

1. encourage competition where feasible,
2. minimize information asymmetry costs by gathering information and incentivizing operators to improve their performance,
3. provide for economically efficient price structures, and
4. establish regulatory processes that provide for "regulation under the law and independence, transparency, predictability, legitimacy, and credibility for the regulatory system."

Alternatively, many heterodox economists and legal scholars stress the importance of market regulation for "safeguarding against monopoly formation, the overall stability of markets, environmental harm, and to ensure a variety of social protections." These draw on sociologists (such as Max Weber, Karl Polanyi, Neil Fligstein, and Karl Marx) and the history of government institutions partaking in regulatory processes. "To allow the market mechanism to be sole director of the fate of human beings and their natural environment, indeed, even of the amount and use of purchasing power, would result in the demolition of society."

Principal-agent theory addresses issues of information asymmetry. Here, the government is the principal, and the operator the agent, regardless of who owns the operator. Principal-agent theory is applied in incentive regulation and multi-part tariffs.

== Regulatory metrics ==
The World Bank's Doing Business database collects data from 178 countries on the costs of regulation in certain areas, such as starting a business, employing workers, getting credit, and paying taxes. For example, it takes an average of 19 working days to start a business in the OECD, compared to 60 in Sub-Saharan Africa; the cost as a percentage of GNP (not including bribes) is 8% in the OECD, and 225% in Africa.

The Worldwide Governance Indicators project at the World Bank recognizes that regulations have a significant impact in the quality of governance of a country. The Regulatory Quality of a country, defined as "the ability of the government to formulate and implement sound policies and regulations that permit and promote private sector development" is one of the six dimensions of governance that the Worldwide Governance Indicators measure for more than 200 countries.

The cost of regulations increased by above 1 trillion and can explain 31-37% of the rise in industry concentration.

== Regulatory Quality and Financial Market Integration ==
Measures of regulatory quality, such as the Worldwide Governance Indicators (WGI) Regulatory Quality Index, are widely used in regulatory economics to assess the effectiveness, consistency, and credibility of regulatory frameworks across countries. These indicators capture perceptions of a government's ability to formulate and implement sound policies and regulations that permit and promote private sector development (Kaufmann, Kraay, & Mastruzzi, 2010).

In financial economics, regulatory quality has been increasingly examined as a determinant of cross-country financial market integration. Strong regulatory environments are associated with improved investor protection, reduced information asymmetries, and greater confidence in market institutions, all of which facilitate capital flows and co-movement across equity markets (La Porta, Lopez-de-Silanes, Shleifer, & Vishny, 1998; Hail & Leuz, 2006).

Recent studies extend this line of inquiry by linking regulatory quality to systemic measures of market integration. For example, Haddad et al. (2026) analyse how variations in regulatory quality influence cross-country equity market co-movements using the Scaled Correlation Index (SCI), a capitalization-weighted aggregation of time-varying correlations across markets (Gupta, Haddad, & Selvanathan, 2024). This approach moves beyond bilateral correlation measures by capturing the extent to which regulatory environments shape a country's embeddedness within the broader global financial system.

This emerging literature highlights the role of institutional quality not only in shaping domestic market outcomes but also in conditioning the degree of global financial interconnectedness.

== Deregulation ==
=== In modern American politics ===
Overly complicated regulatory law, increasing inflation, concern over regulatory capture, and outdated transportation regulations made deregulation an appealing idea in the US in the late 1970s. During his presidency (1977-1981), President Jimmy Carter introduced sweeping deregulation reform of the financial system (by the removal of interest rate ceilings) and the transportation industry, allowing the airline industry to operate more freely.

President Ronald Reagan took up the mantle of deregulation during his two terms in office (1981-1989) and expanded upon it with the introduction of Reaganomics, which sought to stimulate the economy through income and corporate tax cuts coupled with deregulation and reduced government spending. Though favored by industry, Reagan-era economic policies concerning deregulation are regarded by many economists as having contributed to the Savings and Loan Crisis of the late 1980s and 1990s.

The allure of free market capitalism remains present in American politics today, with many economists recognizing the importance of finding balance between the inherent risks associated with investment and the safeguards of regulation. Some, particularly members of industry, feel that lingering regulations imposed after the 2008 financial crisis such as the Dodd–Frank Wall Street Reform and Consumer Protection Act are too stringent and impede economic growth, especially among small businesses. Others support continued regulation on the basis that deregulation of the financial sector led to the 2008 financial crisis and that regulations lend stability to the economy.

In 2017, President Donald Trump signed an executive order that he claimed would "knock out two regulations for every new regulation." Trump made the claim: "Every regulation should have to pass a simple test. Does it make life better or safer for American workers or consumers? If the answer is no, we will be getting rid of it."

=== Counterparts ===
A common counterpart of deregulation is the privatization of state-run industries. The goal of privatization is for market forces to increase the efficiency of denationalized industries. Privatization was widely pursued in Great Britain throughout Margaret Thatcher's administration. Though largely considered a success and considerably reducing government deficit, critics argue that standards, wages, and employment declined due to privatization. Others point out that lack of careful regulations on some of the privatized industries is a source of continued problems.

== Controversy ==
=== Proponents ===
The regulation of markets is to safeguard society and has been the mainstay of industrialized capitalist economic governance through the twentieth century. Karl Polanyi refers to this process as the 'embedding' of markets in society. Further, contemporary economic sociologists such as Neil Fligstein (in his 2001 Architecture of Markets) argue that markets depend on state regulation for their stability, resulting in a long term co-evolution of the state and markets in capitalist societies in the last two hundred years.

=== Opponents ===
There are various schools of economics that push for restrictions and limitations on governmental role in economic markets. Economists who advocate these policies do not necessarily share principles, such as Nobel Prize-winning economists Milton Friedman (monetarist school), George Stigler (Chicago School of Economics / Neo-Classical Economics), Friedrich Hayek (Austrian School of Economics), and James M. Buchanan (Virginia School of Political Economy) as well as Richard Posner (Chicago School / Pragmatism). Generally, these schools attest that government needs to limit its involvement in economic sectors and focus instead on protecting individual rights (life, liberty, and property). This position is alternatively summarized in what is known as the Iron Law of Regulation, which states that all government regulation eventually leads to a net loss in social welfare.

Some argue that companies are incentivized to behave in a socially responsible manner, therefore eliminating the need for external regulation, by their commitment to stakeholders, their interest in preserving reputability, and their goals for long term growth.

== See also ==
- Economic interventionism
- Financial economics § Financial markets
- Administrative law
- Averch-Johnson effect
- Banded forbearance
- Constitutional economics
- Liberalization
- Policy uncertainty
- Price-cap regulation
- Natural monopoly
- Public choice theory
- Regulated market
- Regulation school
- Worldwide Governance Indicators
