= Journal of Regulatory Economics =

- Discipline: Regulatory economics
- Language: English
- Edited by: Menaham Spiegel

Publication details
- History: 1989-present
- Publisher: Springer Science+Business Media
- Frequency: Bimonthly
- Impact factor: 0.909 (2016)

Standard abbreviations
- ISO 4: J. Regul. Econ.

Indexing
- CODEN: JRECEC
- ISSN: 0922-680X (print); 1573-0468 (web)
- LCCN: 91642776
- OCLC no.: 890301285

Links
- Journal homepage; Online archive

The Journal of Regulatory Economics is a bimonthly peer-reviewed academic journal covering regulatory economics. It was established in 1989 and is published by Springer Science+Business Media. The founding editor-in-chief was Michael A. Crew (Rutgers Business School – Newark and New Brunswick), and the current one is Menaham Spiegel (Rutgers University). According to the Journal Citation Reports, the journal has a 2016 impact factor of 0.909.
