= Independent regulatory agencies in Turkey =

Independent regulatory agencies in Turkey are public authorities within the executive branch of the state that are autonomous from the government or any other bodies. They constitute service-based (as opposed to geographical) decentralized administration in terms of the Turkish constitution.

Independent regulatory agencies represent a historically unfamiliar mode of governance in Turkey whose tradition of public administration favors a strong and centralized state with a preference of market intervention. The waves of liberalization and privatization measures taken following the 1980 coup d'etat, the conditionalities imposed by the European Union and the economic crises during the 1990s and early 2000s provided the necessary momentum for their establishment.

Despite a certain degree of controversy in the Turkish legal doctrine most scholars have accepted that the concept has been well-established within Turkish legal and administrative system even though there is no legal framework governing these bodies nor a sufficient body of case-law by the supreme judicial courts that clarify their administrative nature.

Independent regulatory agencies in Turkey include:

- the Competition Authority
- the Banking Regulation and Supervision Authority
- the Capital Markets Authority
- the Energy Market Regulation Authority
- the Public Procurement Authority
- the Radio and Television Supreme Council
- the Savings Deposit Insurance Fund (previously a branch of the Banking Regulation and Supervision Authority)
- the Telecommunication Authority
- the Tobacco, Tobacco Products and Alcoholic Beverages Markets Regulation Board.

The Sugar Authority and the Restructuring Board can also be conceived as independent regulatory agencies.
