= Banded forbearance =

Banded forbearance is an alternate approach to price regulation in partially liberalized telecom markets. Developed by LIRNEasia, the approach is useful especially for regulatory agencies with limited capacities, markets with limited competitors, and markets that are fast changing and dynamic.

This method is based on the concept of forbearance, wherein regulators refrain from regulating the market unless deemed necessary. Banded forbearance incorporates benchmarking and encourages symmetric regulation over the preferred asymmetric regulatory approaches.

== Methodology ==
In this form of benchmark regulation, the regulator will

1. define a benchmarking methodology such as an adaptation of the OECD basket methodology, including peer countries and weights
2. define a band of allowed variance above and below what is likely to be a moving benchmark, within which prices will be fully forborne, and
3. specify competition-related criteria that will be used to evaluate price movements below the lower band (limited to tests on predation and price squeeze).

Durations of validity for the bands and default outcomes can also be specified in order to reduce uncertainty.
