= Rate-of-return regulation =

Rate-of-return regulation is a system for setting the prices charged by government-regulated companies like public utilities. It attempts to set prices at efficient (non-monopolistic, competitive) levels equal to the efficient costs of production, plus a government-permitted rate of return on capital.

Rate-of-return regulation is similar, but not identical to, cost-based or profit margin regulations, in which a company's maximum profit margin is capped. Margin caps are often criticized by economists for encouraging cost-padding or gold-plating, in which a regulated monopoly takes on unnecessary costs to receive additional payment. A similar effect, known as the Averch–Johnson effect, encourages firms under rate-of-return regulations to adopt capital-labor ratios that are too high.

Rate-of-return regulation was dominant in the US for a number of years in the government regulation of utilities. Profit margin caps are still used in health insurance.

== Method of regulation ==
Rate-of-return regulation is considered fair because it gives the company the opportunity to recover the costs of serving their customers while protecting consumers from paying exorbitant prices. Under this method of regulation, government regulators examine the firm's rate base, cost of capital, operating expenses, depreciation expenses and taxes in order to estimate the total revenue needed for the firm to fully recover its expenses.

=== Revenue requirement calculation ===
Regulators combine a company's expenses and cost of capital to calculate a revenue requirement. This revenue requirement becomes the target revenue for setting prices.

$R = (B \times r) + E + d + T$

- $R$=Revenue requirement: The amount of revenue the regulated monopoly requires in order to cover its costs in their entirety
- $B$=Rate base: The amount of capital and assets the regulated monopoly utilizes in order to provide its services
- $r$=Government permitted rate of return: The cost the regulated monopoly incurs to finance its rate base including debt and equity
- $E$=Operating expenses: The cost of supplies including capital and labor used on a short-term basis (usually one year) in order to provide services (does not include initial investments included in base rate such as cost of supplies to build plant)
- $d$=Depreciation expenses: The annual amount the regulated monopoly spends on accounting for depreciation of its capital
- $T$=Taxes: Those taxes not included in operating expenses and not charged directly to customers

=== Basics for assessing rate of return ===
The goal of rate-of-return regulation is for the regulator to evaluate the effects of different price levels on a public utility's potential earnings, protect consumers and provide the utility the opportunity to receive a "fair" rate of return on its investment. There are five criteria utilized by regulators to assess the suitable rate of return for a firm.

1. The first criterion is whether the rate of return is at a level substantial enough to attract capital from investors. Government regulation of this fashion is meant to ensure that firms don't abuse their monopoly powers to take advantage of consumers; however, they must also ensure that regulation does not prevent customers from acquiring their essential goods and services. If the rate of return is too low, investors will not invest in the firm, preventing it from having the financial capital to operate and invest in physical capital and labor, which in turn would result in consumers being unable to receive their sufficient level of service, such as electricity for their homes.
2. The second criterion that regulators must consider is the efficient consumer-rationing of services provided by regulated firms. To promote consumer efficiency, prices should reflect marginal costs; however, this must also be balanced with the first criterion.
3. Thirdly, regulators must ensure that the regulated monopolistic firm utilizes efficient management practices. Here a regulator can examine whether or not the firm's leadership is taking advantage of loopholes in regulation by overstating costs in order to be permitted to operate at a higher price level.
4. A fourth criterion is the firm's long-term stability. As above mentioned, one of government's chief concerns is to ensure consumers are able to receive their required level of service. Therefore, regulators must take into account the future prospects of the firm, similarly to the way in which an investor would evaluate a company's future potential.
5. The fifth and final criterion the regulator must take into account is fairness to the investors. This is a separate concern from the first criterion since the regulator must both ensure that the company receives the capital it needs to continue operating and that investors are receiving a fair return on their investment. If the return is not fair, the firm will have difficulty attracting investors.

== Advantages ==
Rate-of-return regulation was mainly used due to its ability to be sustainable in the long-term and resistant to changes in the company's conditions as well as its popularity among investors. While regulation of this type prevents monopolies with the potential to make large profits from doing so, such as electricity companies, it provides stability. Investors will not make as large dividends off of regulated utility companies; however, they will be able to make fairly constant, substantial returns despite fluctuations in the economy or firm composure. Investor risk is minimized since the regulator's prudence in price setting is constrained by the method used to set the regulation rate. Therefore, investors can depend on consistency, which can be an attractive offer, especially in a volatile world market.

Furthermore, regulation of this sort protects the firm from negative public opinion while providing the consumer with ease of mind. Throughout history, due to their large profits, public opinion has turned against monopolies, which eventually resulted in severe anti-trust laws in the early 20th century. Unregulated monopolies such as Standard Oil that pulled vast profits quickly became the subjects of negative public opinion, the original source of regulation of monopolies. With rate-of-return regulation, consumers can rely on the government to ensure that they are paying fair prices for their electricity and other regulated services, and not feeding into a business of trusts and greed.

== Disadvantages and criticism ==
The central problem with rate-of-return regulation, the reason most countries with economic regulation have switched to alternate methods of regulating such firms, is that rate-of-return regulation does not provide strong incentives for regulated firms to operate efficiently. The main form of this weakness is the Averch-Johnson effect.

Firms regulated in this manner may engage in disproportionate capital accumulation, which in turn will heighten the price level allotted by the government regulator, raising the firm's short-term profits. Unnecessary capital expenditures and operating expenses would increase the firm's revenue requirement (R) as a result of both an increase in operating expenses (E) and depreciation costs (d). Depreciation costs rise due to the fact that as a firm obtains more capital, that physical capital will depreciate over time, thereby raising the overall depreciation cost and their regulated price level as allocated by the government.

== History ==
The right of states to prescribe rates was affirmed in the United States Supreme Court case of Munn v. Illinois of 1877. This case generally allowed states to regulate certain businesses and practices within their borders, including railroads, which had risen to substantial power at the time. This case was one of six that were later dubbed the "Granger Cases", all concerning the proper degree of government regulation on private industry.

While the political sentiment of the early 20th century was increasingly anti-monopoly and anti-trust, government officials recognized the need for some goods and services to be provided by monopolies. In specific cases, a monopolistic economic model is more efficient than a perfectly competitive model. This type of firm is called a "natural monopoly" due to the fact that the cost-technology of the industry is markedly high, suggesting that it is more effective for only one or a few firms to dominate production. In a monopolistic market, one or several firms can make the large investment necessary, and in turn provide a large enough percentage of the output to cover the costs of their large initial investment. In a competitive market, numerous firms would be required to spend large sums on the necessary capital only to produce a small quantity of output, thereby sacrificing economic efficiency.

The system of rate setting was developed through a series of Supreme Court cases beginning with the Smyth v. Ames case in 1898. In this so-called "Maximum Freight Case", the Supreme Court defined the constitutional limits of governmental power to set railroad utility rates. The Court stated that regulated industries had a right to "fair return." This was later overturned in the Federal Power Commission v. Hope Natural Gas Company case, but it was important to the development of rate-of-return regulation and more generally, to the practice of government regulation of private industry.

As the concept of rate-of-return regulation spread throughout the anti-trust leaning America, the question of "what profit should investors receive?" became the main decisive issue. This was the question the Hope case set out to answer in 1944.

Failing prices in the late 19th century raised the issue of whether profit should be based on the amount the investors originally invested in assets years earlier, or on the lower current asset value resulting from a drop in overall price level. The Hope case settled on a compromise for asset valuation. With respect to debt capital, Hope accepted the original historic cost as reasonable for valuating the debt portion of the asset rate base and allowing the historically agreed upon interest rate as its rate of return. However, with respect to equity capital, Hope determined that the current return value would be acceptable. Therefore, asset valuation was to be calculated by regulators based on a combination of historical cost and current return value.

Rate-of-return regulation was primarily used in the United States to regulate utility companies that provide goods such as electricity, gas, telephone service, water, and television cable to the general public. Despite its relative success in regulating such companies, rate-of-return regulation was gradually replaced in the late 20th century by new, more efficient forms of regulation such as price-cap regulation and revenue-cap regulation. Price-cap regulation was developed in the 1980s by British Treasury economist Stephen Littlechild and was gradually incorporated globally into monopoly regulations. Price-cap regulation adjusts firm prices according to a price cap index which reflects the inflation rate in the economy generally, efficiencies a specific firm is able to utilize relative to the average firm in the economy, and the inflation in a firm's output prices relative to the average firm in the economy. Revenue-cap regulation is a similar means of regulating monopolies, except instead of prices being the regulated variable, regulators set revenue limits. These new forms of regulation gradually replaced rate-of-return regulation in the American and global economies. While rate-of-return regulation is very susceptible to the Averch-Johnson effect, new forms of regulation avoid this loophole by using indexes to properly evaluate firm efficiency and use of resources.
