= Corporate ethics committee =

Group appointed to address ethical issues

An ethics committee can be defined as a group of people who are appointed to address ethical issues by an organisation. In corporate settings, these ethical dilemmas can either present themselves internally, for example in the form of organization related issues. Ethical dilemmas may also arise outside the organization but still significantly impact it, making them relevant for the ethics committee to discuss.

== History ==
Historically, ethical practices in the financial sector were largely based on trust, and later, religious beliefs. After multiple financial troubles in the 20th century, like the Great Depression, the importance of ethical oversight was recognised. The first activity of companies actually taking action in setting up board committees like public responsibility committees took place in the 1970's, following the rise of social movements. The next wave of pressure emerged following numerous scandals in the turn of the century, like the Enron scandal and the WorldCom scandal in the U.S.

Names for committees of this kind can differ greatly depending on the company and the origination. Common names are public issues committee, corporate responsibility committee and sustainability committee. Groups under the name of an ethics committee might also often refer to a more compliance-focussed committee. This is where internal compliance with guidelines can be reported to and is discussed.

== Functions ==
In corporate settings, an ethics committee is a group of people responsible for overseeing the ethical dimensions of an organization's activities, both internally and externally. The main responsibilities of the committee include ensuring the organization's ethical standards are clearly defined and documented, and ensuring adherence to these ethical standards within the organization and, where applicable, across external operations like supply chains or external stakeholders. In addition, codes of conduct are often implemented to promote values of integrity, accountability and transparency. They guide the ethical behaviour and decision making of institutions and their employees. While many institutions have a code of conduct, the way it is regulated and supervised can differ greatly.

It could also be argued that one of the functions of an ethics committee can be to restore or create confidence in the system, for example in banking. This to restore trust that was lost after the numerous unethical practices and scandals as described earlier.

Compliance related issues are also often ascribed to an ethics committee. In this case, the committee provides a forum for employees to speak up about unethical behaviour within the organisation. However, in many companies, this task is carried out by a compliance department.

== Data ethics ==
With the emergence of new technological developments came new ethical dilemmas. Examples of this can be how to handle the protection of personal (client)data, and how to manage the balance between convenience and confidentiality. But also how to deal with the implications of artificial intelligence, such as bias, accountability and transparency, and how to avoid the possible discrimination and unfairness resulting from the use of algorithms and data. Some companies have a separate ethics committee specifically for reviewing the ethics of their data management practices. These committees focus on ensuring that data is handled ethically and responsibly, addressing issues such as privacy, consent, and data security.

== Notable laws and regulations ==
South-Africa has a Companies Act that prescribes that certain companies should have a social and ethics committee. These committees will oversee the company's social, commercial and ethical responsibility. The introduction of the act ensured a legal obligation of a company's responsibility to their stakeholders.

== Companies housing an ethics committee ==
This list is not exhaustive and subject to change.

Corporation	Committee Name	Members	Responsibility	Scope	Founded	Meetings per year	One or two tier board	Country
Rabobank	Ethics Committee	The CEO is chair. The other members have responsibility for policy or a customer segment, represent the younger generation, or contribute general (research) knowledge and experience.	Acts as an advisory board for the Managing Board and the organization, primarily for new or complex issues or phenomena.	For example KYC, Human rights, Armaments industry, Animal welfare, Nuclear energy, Shale gas, and the Rabobank Compass and Data Manifest.	1998	5-6	Two-tier	Netherlands
Google (Alphabet) (Disbanded since April 2019)	Advanced Technology External Advisory Council	Alessandro Acquisti, Bubacarr Bah, De Kai, Dyan Gibbens, Joanna Bryson, Kay Coles James, Luciano Floridi, William Joseph Burns.	An ethical charter to guide the responsible development and use of AI in our research and products.			4		United States of America
Volksbank	Ethics Committee	Executive Committee, senior management, the Works Council and representatives of first line and second line functions.	Giving advice on ethical issues and promoting ethical conduct within the bank and plays a crucial role in addressing significant normative questions and providing guidance on bank-wide ethical dilemmas.			7	Two-tier	Netherlands
ABN AMRO	Ethics Committee	Six members from senior management, including the CEO, and three members from diverse backgrounds within the organisation that rotate every 12 months.	Considers moral questions that need to be addressed. Problems for which neither law or regulations provide unambiguous answers, the matter can be put to the Ethics Committee.	The Ethics Committee does not issue any rulings, but gives sound, well-considered advice.		4	Two- tier	Netherlands
Sociale verzekeringsbank	Ethics center							
Unilever	Corporate Responsibility Committee	Judith McKenna (Chair), Ruby Lu, Benoît Potier, Zoe Yujnovich.	Oversees Unilever's conduct as a responsible and ethical global business, reviews sustainability-related risks and reputational matters and provides guidance and recommendations to the Board on sustainability and reputational matters.	The governance of sustainability, covering social, human rights, business conduct and environmental matters.		4	One-tier	United Kingdom
Reliance Nippon Life Insurance	Ethics Committee	Executive council and CEO	To review and recommend to management and the Board of Directors (the "Board") objectives, policies and procedures that best serve the Company's interests in maintaining a business environment committed to high standards of ethics and integrity, corporate responsibility and legal compliance.				India	
