= Building block model =

Model for public utility regulation in Australia

The building block model is a form of public utility regulation that is common in Australia. Variants of the building block model are currently used in Australia in the regulation of electricity transmission and distribution, gas transmission and distribution, railways, postal services, urban water and sewerage services, irrigation infrastructure, and port access. The Australian Competition & Consumer Commission (ACCC) has stated that it intends to use a version of the building block model to determine indicative access prices for fixed-line telecommunications services. The building block model is so-called because the allowed revenue of the regulated firm is equal to the sum of underlying components or building blocks consisting of the return on capital, the return of capital (also known as depreciation), the operating expenditure, and various other components such as taxes and incentive mechanisms.

== Origin ==
Although the principles behind the building block approach are very similar to the principles in many other regulatory regimes around the world (especially the UK), the first use of the term in Australia was in 1998 by the Office of the Regulator General (ORG) in Victoria (the predecessor of the Essential Services Commission). The ORG issued a consultation paper on the framework for setting price controls under the 1995 Victorian Electricity Supply Tariff Order, to apply to electricity distribution networks in Victoria from the beginning of 2001. The Tariff Order required the ORG to "utilise price based regulation adopting a CPI-X approach and not rate of return regulation". In a subsequent application for judicial review in the Supreme Court of Victoria, the regulator described the 'building block approach' that it had used to drive the X factor as follows:

(a) Establishing forward looking cost or expenditure benchmarks for each of the distributors for operating expenditure, capital expenditure, and cost of capital;

(b) establishing an amount for depreciation;

(c) determining an additional allowance called the efficiency carry over amount for operating and capital costs savings achieved by the distributors in the first period;

(d) establishing a benchmark revenue comprising the amounts derived in accordance with the steps (a) to (c) above, which is known as the building blocks approach;

(e) establishing demand projections for each distributor for the period 1 January 2001 to 31 December 2005;

(f) modelling the X factors to produce a price path for the basket of Network Tariffs whereby an efficient distributor, based on the demand projection, can be expected to earn the benchmark revenue;

The court accepted that this 'building block approach' was not rate-of-return regulation:

The building block approach adopted by the Office in its price fixing review is forward looking, in that it looked at expected reasonable expenditure ... . Further, it did not determine the specific operating costs for a particular distributor, but create a benchmark forecast of what the efficient firm might spend, which created an incentive to earn more than what might be described as a reasonable rate of return for a particular distributor.

The ACCC adopted a building block approach in its 1999 draft guideline on how it would set electricity transmission revenue caps under the 1998 National Electricity Code. The approach was subsequently adopted in other sectors regulated by the ACCC and by other state regulators around Australia. Following the replacement of the National Electricity Code with the National Electricity Rules in 2005, the building block approach was confirmed (with various modifications) in a 2006 review carried out by the Australian Energy Market Commission. The National Electricity Rules were amended in 2006 to provide that the annual revenue requirement for a regulated electricity transmission network must be determined using a 'building block approach' under which the 'building blocks are:

(1) indexation of the regulatory asset base ...;

(2) a return on capital for that year ...;

(3) the depreciation for that year ... ;

(4) the estimated cost of corporate income tax of the provider for that year ...;

(5) certain revenue increments or decrements for that year arising from the efficiency benefit sharing scheme ... ;

(6) the forecast operating expenditure accepted or substituted by the AER for that year ...; and

(7) compensation for other risks ...

A similar provision has applied to regulated electricity distributors from 1 January 2008. In 2010, the ACCC issued a draft report proposing to adopt a form of the building block model in the regulation of fixed-line telecommunications services.

The 1998 National Electricity Code did not allow the ACCC to roll forward automatically the value of the regulatory asset base from one regulatory period to the next (in contrast to the 1997 National Third Party Access Code for Natural Gas Pipeline Systems). By current National Electricity Rules and National Gas Rules, the regulatory asset base is locked-in using the asset base roll forward equation below. The telecommunications regime has also been amended from 1 January 2011 to allow the ACCC to make access determinations that include 'fixed principles'. The amendment will allow the ACCC to lock-in the value of the asset base across regulatory periods.

== Basis ==
The building block model is a tool for spreading or amortizing the expenditure of a regulated firm over time. The building block model, when applied correctly and consistently over time, ensures that the firm earns a revenue stream with a present value equal to the present value of its expenditure stream. Put another way, the building block model ensures that over the life of the firm, the cash-flow stream of the firm has a net present value equal to zero.

The building block model makes use of the concept of the regulatory asset base. The regulatory asset base – which is related to the capital stock of the regulated firm – represents the amount that the firm has, in effect, borrowed from its investors in the past (that is, the amount to which its past expenditure has exceeded its past revenue) and is therefore the amount that must be paid back to investors (with interest) over the remaining life of the firm.

In its simplest form, the building block model can be expressed as two equations, the "revenue equation" and the "asset base roll forward" equation.

=== Revenue equation ===
The revenue equation is an expression which relates the allowed revenue of the regulated firm to the sum of the return on capital (the appropriate cost of capital multiplied by the regulatory asset base) plus the return of capital (also known as the depreciation) plus the operating expenditure (in addition, in many applications of the building block model there are other terms, such as compensation for tax liabilities):

$$Rev_t = WACC_t \times RAB_{t-1} + Dep_t+Opex_t$$

Here: $Rev_t$ is the target allowed revenue of the regulated firm in the current regulatory period, $WACC_t$ is the appropriate cost of capital (also known as the discount rate) for the cash-flow stream of the firm during the current regulatory period, $RAB_{t-1}$ is the closing regulatory asset base at the end of the previous period (the product of the cost of capital times the asset base is also known as the "return on capital"), $Dep_t$ is the regulatory depreciation in the current period, and $Opex_t$ is the expected or forecast operating expenditure of the firm in the current regulatory period.

The revenue equation is embodied, for example, in the "Post Tax Revenue Model" spreadsheet used by the Australian Energy Regulator.

=== Asset base roll-forward equation ===
The asset base roll-forward equation is an expression which relates the closing regulatory asset base at the end of the period to the opening asset base at the start of the period plus any new capital expenditure that occurs during the regulatory period less any depreciation during the regulatory period.

$$RAB_t = RAB_{t-1} +Capex_t - Dep_t\,\!$$

Here: $RAB_t$ is the closing asset base at the end of the current period, $RAB_{t-1}$ is the closing asset base at the end of the previous period, $Capex_t$ is the capital expenditure of the firm in the current period, and $Dep_t$ is the regulatory depreciation during the current period.

The asset base roll forward equation is embodied, for example, in the "Roll Forward Model" spreadsheet used by the Australian Energy Regulator.

The primary reason for using the building block model can be stated as follows: Provided (a) the regulator chooses a path of the regulatory asset base which starts at zero before the firm incurs any expenditure and ends at zero after the end of the life of the firm (or, equivalently, provided the sum of the allowed depreciation each period adds up to the total capital expenditure of the firm) and (b) provided the regulator chooses a value for the WACC which reflects the firm's true cost of capital then the resulting path of allowed revenue given by the equations above has the property that the net present value of the cash-flow of the firm (that is, the revenue less the expenditure) is precisely zero.

=== Description ===
Early implementations of the building block model in Australia in respect of electricity networks permitted the regulatory asset base to be periodically revalued, using a valuation methodology such as the depreciated optimised replacement cost (DORC). This approach does not in general ensure that the regulated firm will achieve an overall net present value of zero. A net present value of zero can, in principle, be achieved on average if the expected or forecast revaluation is anticipated in the depreciation chosen at the start of the regulatory period. In practice, the depreciation has not been set in this way. Periodic revaluation of the regulatory asset base exposes the regulated firm to material risk, creates strong incentives for lobbying for a higher valuation, and may create a problem of under-compensation for upgrade or maintenance capital expenditure. Periodic revaluation of the asset base has replaced been replaced in the current National Electricity Rules by the "lock in and roll forward" approach embodied in the asset-base-roll-forward equation set out above.

The building block model is useful as a tool for amortizing the expenditure of a regulated firm over time. In almost all applications there is an infinite number of ways of carrying out that amortization - which are reflected in the building block approach in the discretion of the regulator over the choice of the path of the regulatory asset base or the path of depreciation. The building block model does not determine the "efficient cost" of providing a particular service in a given year. In most applications regulators simply choose a path for depreciation without consideration of the effect on the overall path of allowed revenues. This is a form of cost allocation which has been criticised by economists as having no particular economic significance.

The building block model does not determine individual prices. Once the building block has been used to determine a particular choice of the revenue allowance of the firm in a given year, the regulator must use some other process or mechanism to yield individual regulated prices. Usually those prices are chosen in such a way that, when using those prices, the regulated firm is forecast to recover a revenue stream equal to that given by the building block model.

The building block model can be applied with all inputs expressed in nominal or real terms, provided the cost of capital is also expressed in consistent nominal or real terms. Similarly, the building block model can in principle be applied over any length of regulatory period (e.g., one month, one year, or five years) provided the cost of capital is set consistently with the length of the regulatory period.

The building block model treats operating expenditure and capital expenditure symmetrically in that the allowed revenue is sufficient to cover the sum of both types of expenditure. In this sense, the classification of expenditure into operating expenditure or capital expenditure is of no long-term consequence. If, as is often the case, the regulator implements the building block by first choosing a path for depreciation, any change in operating expenditure results in an immediate change in the allowed revenue of the firm whereas a change in capital expenditure is spread (amortized) over time.

The building block model is usually applied with a regulatory period lasting several years (typically five in the context of electricity transmission and distribution). The allowed revenue is usually profiled over this five-year regulatory period using a "CPI-X" smoothing mechanism - that is the revenue is allowed to adjust from year to year at the rate of inflation less a constant factor. In this context the X factor is merely a smoothing factor and has no impact on the incentives of the regulated firm. This mechanism ensures smooth real revenues during the regulatory period but since, in practice, jumps in revenues have been allowed between regulatory periods (the so-called P0 adjustment), smooth real revenues are not necessarily achieved overall.

One common variation of the standard building block model is the introduction of an inflation adjustment to the asset-base roll forward equation, as follows:

$$RAB_t = (1+inflation_t) \times RAB_{t-1} +Capex_t - Dep_t$$

Where $inflation_t$ is the rate of change in a price index over the previous period. This variation is usually combined with an equal-and-offsetting change in the revenue equation (specifically the use of a real rather than nominal cost of capital or discount rate) so as to have no effect overall.

== Incentives ==
The building block model can be implemented in such a way that the regulated firm receives a revenue stream just equal in value to the firm's out-turn expenditure. This is usually undesirable since it would result in the firm having no incentive to improve its overall efficiency or to increase the volume or quality of the services it provides. To overcome this problem the building block model is usually implemented in a way that allows the firm financial rewards for pursuing desirable objectives – such as reducing its expenditure, or maintaining or improving service quality, and sometimes for selecting efficient capital investments, or promoting innovation.

It is common in regulatory frameworks that make use of the building block model, to incorporate additional factors which reward the regulated firm for maintaining or improving service quality. Examples include the Essential Service Commission's S-factor scheme or the ACCC's Service Target Performance Incentive Scheme.

Historically much interest has focussed on the incentives on the regulated firm to enhance efficiency – that is, incentives to reduce its expenditure while maintaining a given quantity and quality of output. In principle, the building block model can be designed so as to yield either very low-powered incentives to minimise expenditure (which is sometimes known as cost-of-service or rate-of-return regulation) or very high-powered incentives. The building block model can be implemented in such a way as to yield very high-powered incentives to reduce expenditure by (a) setting the operating and capital expenditure inputs in the building block model on the basis of forecasts which are independent of the regulated firm's own actions, and (b) not "clawing back" any over-spend or under-spend at the end of the regulatory period. High-powered incentives create their own problems – they create strong incentives on the firm to cut expenditure or defer capital expenditure – even at the expense of reducing service quality. In addition, high powered incentives expose the regulated firm to higher levels of risk and give rise to strong incentives to lobby the regulator for a higher target level of revenue. Economic theory does not support the use of very high-powered incentives and, in practice, almost all practical regulatory regimes tend to involve medium-powered incentives.

Although details vary across regimes, the most common approach to creating incentives to reduce expenditure is to use a regulatory period consisting of many years. The allowed revenue is set once at the beginning of the regulatory period and there is no clawback of over-spend or under-spend at the end of the regulatory period – thereby allowing the regulated firm to keep some or all of the cost savings it makes during the regulatory period. The operating expenditure input to the building block model is usually based closely on the observed operating expenditure at the end of the previous regulatory period. This approach ensures reasonably strong incentives to reduce operating expenditure in the early years of a regulatory period but can, in principle, lead to weak incentives to reduce operating expenditure in the later years of a regulatory period. One way to solve this problem is to base the operating expenditure not just on a single "test year" of the previous regulatory period but on the average of the previous years. In practice this problem is, instead, often addressed with some form of "efficiency carry-over" or "efficiency benefit sharing" scheme.

When it comes to incentives to reduce capital expenditure, concerns arise relating to the strength of the incentives and the possibility for inefficient substitution between opex and capex. Stronger incentives to reduce capex tend to create strong incentives to defer needed network upgrades with possible consequences for long-term service quality. Ofgem in the UK has experimented with improving measures of asset quality and combining capex and opex into a single "totex" expenditure measure. One common approach to handling capital expenditure is simply to allow the regulated firm to keep the depreciation allowance on any higher forecast capital expenditure and simply to "roll in" the out-turn capital expenditure into the regulatory asset base at the end of the regulatory period. Many regulatory frameworks also give the regulator a role in assessing and approving new capital expenditure in what is known as a "prudency" or "used and useful" test.

== Variations and extensions ==
In practice, the building block model is often modified in various ways – particularly to create desired incentives on the regulated firm. These variations include adapting the model to a five-year regulatory period and the introduction of various explicit incentive mechanisms.

=== Uncertainty ===
Most regulated firms continue to face some risk or uncertainty in their financial outcomes, due to uncertainty in the demand they face or in their expenditure. Some of this exposure to risk is deliberately created by the regulatory regime in order to ensure the regulated firm faces desirable incentives (such as incentives to minimise its expenditure).

Most of the time this risk is handled through relatively minor changes to the building block model. Specifically, in the simplest case the regulator must ensure that the revenue the firm receives is on average equal to the return on capital (calculated using an appropriate risk-adjusted cost of capital) plus the return of capital plus the average or "expected" operating expenditure. The regulator can achieve this outcome either by ensuring that the regulated firm is compensated for uncertain events ex post or by ensuring the regulated firm receives sufficient compensation ex ante. As an example of the former, many regulators allow the regulated firm to "pass through" cost events which are largely or entirely outside their control (such as changes in other regulated charges, or changes in some labour rates).

On occasion, it is not feasible to rely on ex post compensation for a risk faced by the regulated firm. This might arise, for example, where the regulated firm faces a risk that demand will drop (or will fail to materialise) in the future, limiting future earnings. Where this risk is material the regulator has no choice but to ensure the regulated firm is adequately compensated on average ex ante.

As a general rule, where the regulatory framework ensures that the regulated firm is adequately compensated on average it must be the case that if there is some positive probability that the out-turn return of the firm is below the allowed cost of capital there must be a positive probability that the out-turn return of the firm is above the allowed cost of capital so that, on average, the firm expects to receive the allowed cost of capital.

=== Loss capitalisation model ===
In some circumstances, especially where the future demand for the services of the regulated firm is uncertain, there is a risk that the regulator will choose a path for depreciation which results in an allowed revenue in a given year which cannot be achieved by the regulated firm (perhaps because demand in that year is lower than expected). If the out-turn revenue of the regulated firm falls short of the allowed revenue in a given year and this is not recognised in the regulatory framework, there is a risk that the regulated firm will not be allowed to earn a cash-flow stream with an NPV of zero overall (in other words, the investors in the firm will be left under-compensated). To overcome this possibility it may make sense to allow the regulated firm to "capitalise" any short-fall in out-turn revenue relative to allowed revenue in a given year by simply adding the shortfall into the regulatory asset base. This approach is equivalent to allowing the firm to defer some of its depreciation in years in which demand is lower than expected. This approach, which has been termed the "loss capitalisation model" has been considered by the ACCC in the context of the regulation of access to rail track infrastructure in Australia.

== Cost of capital ==
The building block model is a tool for amortizing the expenditure of a regulated firm in such a way that the expected net present value of the cash-flow of the firm is zero. For this to be achieved, the regulator must choose the cost of capital to reflect the correct cost of capital or discount rate for the associated cash-flow stream of the firm. This is usually carried out by estimating a weighted average cost of capital for the cash-flow stream of the firm as a whole. Under the standard regulatory approach in Australia where the tax liabilities of the firm are handled as an additional element in the firm's revenue equation, the appropriate weighted average formula is the simple "plain vanilla" formula, consisting of a weighted average of the cost of capital for the firm's equity and the cost of capital for the firm's debt. The cost of capital for the firm's debt is usually estimated by observing the currently prevailing return in the market for corporate bonds of a similar credit rating and duration. The cost of capital for the firm's equity is usually estimated using the capital asset pricing model.

There has been some controversy in Australia over the correct timeframe for the cost of capital. The ACCC and some academics have argued that the correct term for the cost of capital should be the length of the regulatory period (normally five years). Regulated businesses have argued, A longer term is equal to the term of the longest normally-available government bonds (usually ten years). The Australian Competition Tribunal in 2003 held that the use of a long-term rate was appropriate and the common practice in Australia has been to use a ten-year rate since.

== Versus index-based approaches ==
Almost from the start of the current period of public utility regulation in Australia (dating from the late 1990s) commentators have argued against the use of the building block model and in favour of a regulatory approach in which a regulated firm's revenue allowance is set primarily on the basis of an industry-wide change in an index of productivity. This latter approach has been known as a total factor productivity or Index-Based approach to regulation.

Advocates of the TFP or index-based approaches to regulation have claimed that it would result in more powerful incentives to reduce expenditure and lower regulatory costs. Supporters of the current regime have argued that the building block framework is capable of accommodating higher-powered incentives if that is desired, that higher-powered incentives are not necessarily desirable, and that, in practice, almost all regulatory regimes in use around the world involve periodic resetting of allowed revenues to out-turn expenditure - in a manner similar to the current practice in Australia. There does seem to be common ground that there is greater scope for benchmarking - that is inter-firm comparisons of efficiency - in regulatory practice in Australia. The Australian Energy Market Commission is currently carrying out a review of the possible role for total factor productivity in electricity distribution regulation in Australia.
