= Regulation =

General term for rules, including delegated legislation and self-regulation

Regulation is the management of complex systems according to a set of rules and trends. In systems theory, these types of rules exist in various fields of biology and society, but the term has slightly different meanings according to context. For example:

- in government, typically regulation (or its plural) refers to the delegated legislation which is adopted to enforce primary legislation; including land-use regulation
- in economics: regulatory economics
- in finance: financial regulation
- in business, industry self-regulation occurs through self-regulatory organizations and trade associations which allow industries to set and enforce rules with less government involvement; and,
- in biology, gene regulation and metabolic regulation allow living organisms to adapt to their environment and maintain homeostasis;
- in psychology, self-regulation theory is the study of how individuals regulate their thoughts and behaviors to reach goals.

== Forms ==
Regulation in the social, political, psychological, and economic domains can take many forms: legal restrictions promulgated by a government authority, contractual obligations (for example, contracts between insurers and their insureds), self-regulation in psychology, social regulation (e.g. norms), co-regulation, third-party regulation, certification, accreditation or market regulation.

State-mandated regulation is government intervention in the private market in an attempt to implement policy and produce outcomes which might not otherwise occur, ranging from consumer protection to faster growth or technological advancement.

The regulations may prescribe or proscribe conduct ("command-and-control" regulation), calibrate incentives ("incentive" regulation), or change preferences ("preferences shaping" regulation). Common examples of regulation include limits on environmental pollution, laws against child labor or other employment regulations, minimum wages laws, regulations requiring truthful labelling of the ingredients in food and drugs, and food and drug safety regulations establishing minimum standards of testing and quality for what can be sold, and zoning and development approvals regulation. Much less common are controls on market entry, or price regulation.

One critical question in regulation is whether the regulator or government has sufficient information to make ex-ante regulation more efficient than ex-post liability for harm and whether industry self-regulation might be preferable. The economics of imposing or removing regulations relating to markets is analysed in empirical legal studies, law and economics, political science, environmental science, health economics, and regulatory economics.

Power to regulate should include the power to enforce regulatory decisions. Monitoring is an important tool used by national regulatory authorities in carrying out the regulated activities.

In some countries (in particular the Scandinavian countries) industrial relations are to a very high degree regulated by the labour market parties themselves (self-regulation) in contrast to state regulation of minimum wages etc.

=== Measurement ===
Regulation can be assessed for different countries through various quantitative measures. The Global Indicators of Regulatory Governance by World Bank's Global Indicators Group scores 186 countries on transparency around proposed regulations, consultation on their content, the use of regulatory impact assessments and the access to enacted laws on a scale from 0 to 5. The V-Dem Democracy indices include the regulatory quality indicator. The QuantGov project at the Mercatus Center tracks the count of regulations by topic for United States, Canada, and Australia. The length of Code of Federal Regulations of the United States increased over time.

== History ==
Regulation of businesses existed in the ancient early Egyptian, Indian, Greek, and Roman civilizations. Standardized weights and measures existed to an extent in the ancient world, and gold may have operated to some degree as an international currency. In China, a national currency system existed and paper currency was invented. Sophisticated law existed in Ancient Rome. In the European Early Middle Ages, law and standardization declined with the Roman Empire, but regulation existed in the form of norms, customs, and privileges; this regulation was aided by the unified Christian identity and a sense of honor regarding contracts.

Modern industrial regulation can be traced to the Railway Regulation Act 1844 in the United Kingdom, and succeeding Acts. Beginning in the late 19th and 20th centuries, much of regulation in the United States was administered and enforced by regulatory agencies which produced their own administrative law and procedures under the authority of statutes. Legislators created these agencies to require experts in the industry to focus their attention on the issue. At the federal level, one of the earliest institutions was the Interstate Commerce Commission which had its roots in earlier state-based regulatory commissions and agencies. Later agencies include the Federal Trade Commission, Securities and Exchange Commission, Civil Aeronautics Board, and various other institutions. These institutions vary from industry to industry and at the federal and state level. Individual agencies do not necessarily have clear life-cycles or patterns of behavior, and they are influenced heavily by their leadership and staff as well as the organic law creating the agency. In the 1930s, lawmakers believed that unregulated business often led to injustice and inefficiency; in the 1960s and 1970s, concern shifted to regulatory capture, which led to extremely detailed laws creating the United States Environmental Protection Agency and Occupational Safety and Health Administration.

== Regulatory economics ==
Regulatory economics is the application of law by government or regulatory agencies for various economic purposes, including remedying market failure and protecting the environment.

== Regulatory state ==
The term regulatory state refers to the expansion in the use of rulemaking, monitoring and enforcement techniques and institutions by the state and to a parallel change in the way its positive or negative functions in society are being carried out. The expansion of the state nowadays is generally via regulation and less via taxing and spending. The notion of the regulatory state is increasingly more attractive for theoreticians of the state with the growth in the use and application of rule making, monitoring and enforcement strategies and with the parallel growth of civil regulation and business regulation.

== Regulatory capture ==
In politics, regulatory capture (also called agency capture) is a form of corruption of authority that occurs when a political entity, policymaker, or regulator is co-opted to serve the commercial, ideological, or political interests of a minor constituency, such as a particular geographic area, industry, profession, or ideological group.

== Deregulation ==
Deregulation is the process of removing or reducing state regulations, typically in the economic sphere. It is the repeal of governmental regulation of the economy. It became common in advanced industrial economies in the 1970s and 1980s, as a result of new trends in economic thinking about the inefficiencies of government regulation, and the risk that regulatory agencies would be controlled by the regulated industry to its benefit, and thereby hurt consumers and the wider economy. Economic regulations were promoted during the Gilded Age, in which progressive reforms were claimed as necessary to limit externalities like corporate abuse, unsafe child labor, monopolization, and pollution, and to mitigate boom and bust cycles. Around the late 1970s, such reforms were deemed burdensome on economic growth and many politicians espousing neoliberalism started promoting deregulation.

== See also ==
- Consumer protection – Protection of consumers against unfair practices
- Rulemaking – Process by which executive branch agencies create regulations
- Environmental law – Branch of law concerning the natural environment
- Occupational safety and health – Field concerned with the safety, health and welfare of people at work
- Public administration – Academic discipline; implementation or management of policy
- Regulated market – Market regulated and/or controlled by the government
- Regulatory reform
- Regulatory science
- Regulation of science
- Tragedy of the commons – Overuse of a shared resource
- Public choice – Economic theory applied to political science
- Precautionary principle – Risk management strategy
