= LIRNEasia =

Sri Lankan-based think tank

LIRNEasia (Learning Initiatives on Reforms for Network Economies Asia) is an information and communication technology (ICT) policy and regulation think-tank active in the Asia Pacific region. The organization is incorporated under Sri Lankan law as a non-profit organization. It was launched in September 2004 under the leadership of Professor Rohan Samarajiva.

== Research and activities ==
LIRNEasia conducts policy research on information and communications technology and related infrastructure sectors. Since 2012, this has included work on using big data for public policy.

The organization conducts demand-side surveys to measure ICT access and usage. For example, its 2017 survey in Pakistan found that 69% of the population aged 15-65 were not aware of the internet, highlighting a significant usage gap. It also conducted the sole institutional survey assessing internet usage of the Indian government's rural broadband initiative, BharatNet. beyond telecommunications, its Human Resources Research Program published CHOICES – Higher Education Opportunities after A/Levels, a directory profiling 56 institutions and 258 alternative higher education courses in Sri Lanka.

Its research includes analyzing the economic impact of technology. A 2014 systematic review of over 8,000 studies concluded that mobile network coverage in rural areas significantly improves market efficiency and employment.

CEO Helani Galpaya was appointed to the board of the Global Partnership for Sustainable Development Data in 2017.
