= Interagency Advisory Panel on Research Ethics =

The Interagency Advisory Panel on Research Ethics ("The Panel") was formed in 2001 by three of the research funding agencies of the Government of Canada: CIHR, NSERC and SSHRC ("The Agencies"). The Panel "develops, interprets and implements the Tri-Council Policy Statement: Ethical Conduct for Research Involving Humans" (TCPS), as updated in 2014, and the Tri-Agency Framework: Responsible Conduct of Research (RCR Framework), which was updated in 2016, and again in 2021. The Tri-Agency Research Integrity Policy also dictates the conduct of federally-funded researchers.

The Panel "is composed of 12 members drawn from across [Canada] to represent a wide spectrum of expertise and experience in the ethics of human research." (HSR)

== TCPS ==
The Panel's main function is to tend to the Tri-Council Policy Statement: Ethical Conduct for Research Involving Humans (TCPS), originally conceived in 2001. This publication was updated in 2010 and again in 2018 to become known as the TCPS2. Because the individual Agencies represent the pinnacle of research success with the best pay in Canada, their statement on ethics is an embodiment of soft power:

The Agencies require that researchers and their institutions apply the ethical principles and the articles of this Policy and be guided by the Application sections of the articles. Institutions must therefore ensure that research conducted under their auspices complies with this Policy. Researchers are expected, as a condition of funding, to adhere to the TCPS. Institutions should support their efforts to do so. Failure to fulfill the requirements of the TCPS, by the researcher or the institution, may result in recourse by the Agencies, as set out in the Tri-Agency Framework: Responsible Conduct of Research.

== Discussions ==
In May 2018, some epidemiologists at the Ottawa Hospital Research Institute were concerned that research ethics boards (REBs) which are typically located at the institution level, were needed to approve human subject research (HSR), but HSR studies were increasingly conducted across many institutions, and this can delay the studies as the approval process requires each named researcher to obtain approval from his or her REB. These particular researchers recommended that a national REB be instituted for researcher convenience.

In September 2018, the McGill University REB was required to approve a study performed in the nation of India because some researchers who were employed at McGill desired to participate in a study of tuberculosis care in that nation, and due to the requirements of the TCPS a waiver of provider informed consent was sought from the McGill REB.
