= Regulation of science =

The regulation of science refers to use of law, or other ruling, by academic or governmental bodies to allow or restrict science from performing certain practices, or researching certain scientific areas.

Science could be regulated by legislation if areas are seen as harmful, immoral, or dangerous. For these reasons science regulation may be closely related to religion, culture and society.

Science regulation is often a bioethical issue related to practices such as abortion and euthanasia, and areas of research such as stem-cell research and cloning synthetic biology.

== United States ==
=== Biomedical research ===
Unjust events such as the St. Louis tragedy or the Tuskegee syphilis experiment have prompted regulations in biomedical research. Over the years, regulations have been extended to encompass animal welfare and research misconduct. The federal government also monitors the production and sale of the results of biomedical research such as drugs and biopharmaceuticals. The FDA and the Department of Health and Human Services oversee the implementation of these regulations.

The Dickey–Wicker Amendment prohibits the Department of Health and Human Services (HHS) from using appropriated funds for the creation of human embryos for research purposes or for research in which human embryos are destroyed.

==== Human subject research ====
The issue of experimentation on human subjects gained prominence after World War II and the revelation of atrocities committed in the name of science. In the United States, the 1962 Kefauver-Harris amendments to the FDA included for the first time a requirement for informed consent of participants. In 1966, a policy statement by the U.S Surgeon General required that all human subject research go through independent prior review. The National Research Act of 1974 institutionalized this review process by requiring that research centers establish Institutional Review Boards (IRBs).

Universities, hospitals, and other research institutions set up these IRBs to review all the research done at the institution. These boards, generally composed of both scientific peers from the institution and lay persons, are tasked with assessing the risks and benefits associated with the use of human subjects, in addition to the adequacy of the protection and consent of the participants. The IRBs can approve research proposals, make modifications, or disapprove them entirely. Research projects cannot receive federal funding without approval from an IRB. Noncompliance can also induce sanctions from the institution, such as revoked access to facilities and subjects, suspension, and dismissal.

The National Research Act of 1974 also set up the National Commission for the Protection of Human Subjects of Biomedical and Behavioral Research, which produced the Belmont Report (Report on Ethical Principles and Guidelines for the Protection of Human Subjects of Research) in 1979. This report established a moral framework for the regulation of research involving human subjects.

==== Animal welfare ====
The Animal Welfare Act of 1966 sets standards of treatment of animals in research experiments. It requires all research facilities to register with the USDA and allows officials to conduct unannounced facility inspections. The Health Research Extension Act of 1985 requires that all research facilities using animals establish Institutional Animal Care and Use Committees (IACUCs) to evaluate twice a year the institutions' activities involving animals. The IACUCs report to the NIH Office of Laboratory Animal Welfare annually.

==== Research misconduct ====
The Health Research Extension Act of 1985 led to the establishment of the Office of Research Integrity (ORI) within the Department of Health and Human Services. ORI is responsible for reviewing research misconduct allegations and developing policies to improve the responsible conduct of research.

==== Commercialization ====
Two divisions of the Food and Drug Administration (FDA) are in charge of monitoring the production and sale of drugs. The Center for Drug Evaluation and Research is responsible for reviewing new drug applications and requires clinical trials as proof of effectiveness. The Center for Biologics Evaluation and Research is responsible for implementing federal regulations of biopharmaceuticals such as vaccines, blood components, gene therapies, etc. They approve new drugs on the basis of safety and effectiveness, and issue licenses, which allow companies to market their products.

=== Nuclear energy research ===
Nuclear energy is historically linked to issues of national security. From 1942 to 1946, nuclear research was controlled by the military, which conducted research in secrecy. In 1946, the Atomic Energy Act handed over control to civilians, although the government retained a tight monopoly over nuclear energy. The 1954 amendment to this act enabled private industry to pursue non-military applications of nuclear research.

The Energy Reorganization Act of 1974 established the Nuclear Regulatory Commission (NRC), in charge of licensing and safety. The Chernobyl and Fukushima accidents raised concerns and public apprehension over the safety of nuclear power. As a result, the NRC strengthened safety regulations for nuclear power plants.

=== Teaching ===
Science education is a controversial subject in the United States. Several states banned the teaching of evolution in the 20th century, most notably the state of Tennessee with the Butler Act of 1925. It was followed by the Scopes Trial, in which the state of Tennessee accused Scopes, a high school teacher, of teaching evolution. Although he was found guilty and fined, the trial showed declining public support for Fundamentalists. The Scopes Trial had an important impact in the larger creation versus evolution debate. In the following decades, the term "evolution" was omitted in many biology textbooks, even when the text discusses it. These bans on teaching evolution were overturned by a Supreme Court ruling in Epperson v. Arkansas in 1968. Since 2001, there has been a resurgence of anti-evolution bills, one of which, the Louisiana Science Education Act, was passed. This Act allows public schools to use supplementary material that is critical of scientific theories such as evolution and global warming in science classrooms.

The U.S. government and state legislatures have also enacted regulations promoting science education. The National Defense Education Act of 1958 was passed soon after the Soviet Union's launch of Sputnik 1 and linked education with issues of national security. This law provided funding for scholarships and science programs. In 2013, 26 state governments worked together to produce the Next Generation Science Standards, which sets expectations for K–12 science education.

== International regulations ==
The Nuremberg Code was written as part of the trials of Nazi doctors after World War II. It introduced ten ethical principles regarding human experimentation, the first of which requires informed consent from human subjects. It also states that experimentation on humans must be necessary to society, be preceded by studies on animals, and protect subjects from injury, disability and death. The Nuremberg Code was very influential in shaping regulations of scientific research across the world. For example, the Helsinki Declaration of 1964 was developed by the World Medical Association and establishes ethical principles for the medical community.

== See also ==
- Ethics committee
- Intelligent design in politics
- Lysenkoism
- Politicization of science
- Right to science and culture
- Scientific freedom
