= Averch–Johnson effect =

Tendency of regulated companies to engagein capital accumulation

The Averch–Johnson effect is the tendency of regulated companies to engage in excessive amounts of capital accumulation in order to expand the volume of their profits. If companies' profits to capital ratio is regulated at a certain percentage then there is a strong incentive for companies to over-invest in order to increase profits overall. This investment goes beyond any optimal efficiency point for capital that the company may have calculated as higher profit is almost always desired over and above efficiency.

Excessive capital accumulation under rate-of-return regulation is informally known as gold plating.

But the so-called Averch-Johnson effect of overcapitalization does not as a general case involve "gold-plating".

== Mathematical derivation ==
Suppose that a regulated firm wishes to maximize its profit:
$$\pi = R(K,L) - wL - rK$$
where $R(K,L)$ is the revenue function, $K$ is the firm's capital stock, $L$ is the firm's labor stock, $w$ is the wage rate, and $r$ is the cost of capital. The firm's profit is constrained such that:
$$\sigma = {R-wL\over{K}}$$
where $\sigma$ is the allowable rate of return. Assume that $\sigma > r$. We may then form a functional to find the firm's optimal action:
$$J = R(K,L)-wL-rK - \lambda[R(K,L)-wL-\sigma K]$$
where $\lambda$ is the Lagrange multiplier (also known as the shadow price). The derivatives of this functional are:
$$\begin{aligned}
{\partial J\over{\partial K}} &= (1-\lambda)R_{K} - r + \lambda \sigma \\
{\partial J\over{\partial L}} &= (1-\lambda)R_{L} - (1-\lambda)w
\end{aligned}$$
Taken together, this implies that:
$$R_{K} = {r-\lambda \sigma\over{1-\lambda}}, \quad R_{L} = w$$
The ratio of the marginal product of capital and the marginal product of labor is:
$${R_{K}\over{R_{L}}} = {r-\alpha\over{w}}, \quad \alpha = {\lambda\over{1-\lambda}}(\sigma - r)$$
Since this new cost of capital is perceived to be less than the market cost of capital, the firm will tend to overinvest in capital.

== See also ==
- Law and economics
- Public utilities commission
- Rate-of-return regulation
