= Overcapitalisation =

Economic phenomenon

Overcapitalisation, or overcapitalization, refers to an economic phenomenon whereby the value or price of an asset is superior to its ‘real’ value, however difficult to define, therefore putting a strain on attempts to obtain a reasonable return on investment. This is especially the case when capital goods are at stake which are necessary to engage in the production of goods or delivery of services (e.g. agricultural holdings, industrial plants, etc.). It is less the case with those contemporary financial instruments that are valued not for their returns, but for their potential earnings upon resale. Overcapitalisation is closely related (in causes and consequences) to assets inflation. As the financialisation of the economy has led to the monetisation (also called ‘securitisation’) of many non-financial assets, such as real estate, infrastructure, etc., overcapitalisation has become rife, with deleterious consequences at the level of firms (struggling to achieve an unrealistically high level of profitability), households (struggling to pay their inflated mortgage), and individuals (whose equity holding, and hence borrowing and repayment potential, may be vastly over-valued).

== History ==
The concept of overcapitalisation is derived from the writings of Karl Marx, and is divided into overcapitalisation relative to savings and overcapitalisation relative to demand.

== Examples ==
In his book Collapse, Jared Diamond gives an example of widespread overcapitalisation where he describes how settlers in Australia bought or leased land at prices derived from those at 'home' (England), and then were pushed very hard (and usually failed) to achieve the necessary returns, wrecking the fragile resource in the process by over-exploitation.

== Economic consequences ==
Overcapitalisation can impair profitability by raising the amount of capital that must earn an adequate return. In discussions of asset-price booms, the European Central Bank has noted that overvalued asset prices can create vulnerabilities that become costly when valuations correct sharply.

When overcapitalisation is linked to credit expansion and asset-price inflation, the effects may extend beyond individual firms. The International Monetary Fund has described episodes in which rising asset prices are pushed beyond fundamentals, increasing financial fragility and the risk of disruptive reversals.
