= Universal Service Fund =

American system of telecommunications subsidies and fees

The Universal Service Fund (USF) is a system of telecommunications subsidies and fees managed by the United States Federal Communications Commission (FCC) to promote universal access to telecommunications services in the United States. The FCC established the fund in 1997 in compliance with the Telecommunications Act of 1996. Originally designed to subsidize telephone service, since 2011 the fund has expanded its goals to supporting broadband universal service. The Universal Service Fund's budget ranges from $5–8 billion per year depending on the needs of the telecommunications providers. These needs include the cost to maintain the hardware needed for their services and the services themselves. In 2022 disbursements totaled $7.4 billion, split across the USF's four main programs: $2.1 billion for the E-rate program, $4.2 billion for the high-cost program, $0.6 billion for the Lifeline program, and $0.5 billion for the rural health care program.

Unlike many government programs which are funded by general Congressional appropriations, the Universal Service Fund is instead funded by a specific fee on United States telephone providers. While separate itemization is not required by the FCC, it is common for USF fees to be listed separately from other charges on a consumer's bill. As of 2024, the rate for the USF budget was 34.4% of a telecom company's interstate and international end-user revenues.

The structure and funding of the USF has been subject to significant criticism and proposed reforms. One issue is a declining revenue base: consumers' spending on the interstate telephone service that funds the USF has been falling for many years. Some have challenged the constitutionality of having USF fees set without congressional approval and the delegation of authority to the private Universal Service Administrative Company (USAC), which is owned by the National Exchange Carrier Association.

== Background ==
In the modern sense of offering service to all people, the promotion of universal service in telecommunications was crystallized in the 1960s. Some sources point to the earlier Communications Act of 1934 as promoting universal service based on the language of its preamble, but other historians have pointed out that in the early 20th century "universal service" was originally an AT&T marketing slogan about telephone interconnection, not evolving into a legal mandate to serve every American until much later.

=== Implicit subsidies for local service (1970-1982) ===
In the 1960s the telecommunication monopolies were shocked by new evolving technologies and competitions: new long-distance carriers and microwave networks were authorized. Companies such as MCI Communications began to offer long-distance service in direction competition to AT&T. With falling costs on long-distance service, regulators decided to reallocate the increasing profit on long-distance telecommunication to fund subsidies to make local telephone connection more affordable. This process began in the mid 1960 and was institutionalized through the Ozark plan of 1970 into action. At the time of the institutionalization telephone penetration ranged between 85 and 95%. There has been some dispute about whether the charges paid from long-distance service to local carriers were a subsidy or not.

Legally, jurisdiction to regulate rates was split between the Federal Communications Commission (international and interstate) and state commissions (intrastate). During the 91st congress, Fred B. Rooney introduced H.R. 12150 creating a joint board between the Federal Communications Commission and the National Association of Regulatory Utility Commissioners to clearly delineate how telephone regulation was separated by jurisdiction. The joint board met on a voluntary basis and authored the Ozark plan. The situation was then formalized when the bill was reintroduced in the next congress as H.R. 7048 The Federal-State Commissions Joint Board Act and passed into law in 1971.

=== Breakup of the Bell system (1982-1996) ===
There was a push for deregulating the telecommunications industry in the 1980s. Under President Ronald Reagan, the FCC shifted its focus from "social equity to an economic efficiency objective," which it claimed was a primary purpose of the Communications Act of 1934. After AT&T was split up in 1984, universal service was still "supported by a system of above-cost access charges paid to local exchange companies." This system was administered by the National Exchange Carrier Association.

== History ==
=== Telecommunications Act of 1996 ===
The Universal Service Fund was first codified in the Telecommunications Act of 1996, the first major rewrite of the Communications Act of 1934. The act addresses new challenges and opportunities of the digital information age, with the goal of promoting an economic environment conducive for the growth of new information technology. It also further developed the meaning and implementation of universal service. The act calls for the creation of a joint federal-state board to make recommendations to the FCC on defining federal universal services and set time tables. The act also set out immediate priorities of universal service. These include quality and reasonably priced services, access to advanced telecommunication services, access for rural, low-income and high-cost regions, equitable and nondiscriminatory service, specific and predictable price structure, access of advanced telecommunication services for schools and health care and libraries (Sec. 254(b)(1)-(7)). The act provided ability in the constantly changing telecommunication environment to periodically revisit and adjust universal service, while setting core principles (Sec. 254(c)). The 1996 act also "mandated the creation of the universal service fund (USF) into which all telecommunications providers are required to contribute a percentage of their interstate and international end-user telecommunications revenues".

Increased competition and universal service were legislatively addressed and codified with the Telecommunications Act of 1996. The major goals of Universal Service as mandated by the 1996 Act are as follows:

- Promote the availability of quality services at just, reasonable and affordable rates for all consumers
- Increase nationwide access to advanced telecommunications services
- Advance the availability of such services to all consumers, including those in low income, rural, insular, and high cost areas, at rates that are reasonably comparable to those charged in urban areas
- Increase access to telecommunications and advanced services in schools, libraries and rural health care facilities
- Provide equitable and non-discriminatory contributions from all providers of telecommunications services to the fund supporting universal service programs

— Federal Communications Commission, Universal Service

The 1996 Act states that all providers of telecommunications services should contribute to federal universal service in an equitable and nondiscriminatory manner; there should be specific, predictable, and sufficient Federal and State mechanisms to preserve and advance universal service; all schools, classrooms, health care providers, and libraries should, generally, have access to advanced telecommunications services; and finally, that the Federal-State Joint Board and the FCC should determine those other principles that, consistent with the 1996 Act, are necessary to protect the public interest. (Note: Federal Communications Commission. (2009). Universal Service section. Retrieved July 16, 2009 from http://www.fcc.gov/wcb/tapd/universal_service/)

In the past, only long-distance companies made contributions to support the federal Universal Service Fund. The Telecommunications Act of 1996 expanded the types of companies contributing to the Universal Service Fund.

=== Expansion to Voice Over IP services ===
Since the USF fees were originally designed to cover "telecommunications services", voice over IP services which run over the internet were initially not subject to USF fees. Critics argued this avoidance of USF fees helped make the fund unsustainable. In June 2006, the FCC voted to require providers of VoIP services to contribute to the Universal Service Fund the same way traditional telephone services had been contributing.

After the 2018 USF changes, VoIP service providers are now required to provide funds for the USF. However, they are exempt from the cost of using the Internet for information transport whereas DSL internet providers and modern cable services must burden the cost. This expands cost distortion to long-distance telephone providers and it raises the cost of telecommunications service for more consumers.

=== Expansion of the fund into broadband ===
The concept of universal service may include other telecommunications-information services, mainly Internet access.

Many of the services covered by the USF are related to traditional telephone technology. There is a rising concern that more recent developments in telecommunications are just as important to the consumer as these older technologies. For example, consumers' subscriptions to traditional telephone services have fallen while their subscription rate to wireless services have been rising consistently. Yet many cellular companies are likely to receive less funding under the new rules, which may reduce consumers' access to wireless services in areas of the country that have low populations. Similarly, a question currently debated is whether access to broadband internet should be supported by the USF and if so, how best to fulfill such a large mandate without damaging the stability of the fund. The Telecommunications Act of 1996 states that "advanced services" should be accessible to all Americans [Section 254(b)(3)]. One question is whether the providers of internet access should contribute to the fund like other companies that provide access to telecommunications, if such providers also want to draw from the fund. Supporters of including internet access in the Universal Service Fund include former Congressman Rick Boucher (D-VA)

Adding additional services to the fund has corporate support from major telecommunication companies, including Verizon and AT&T. In March 2009, senior executives from Verizon Communications met with the House Subcommittee on Communications, Technology, and the Internet, providing recommendations for how best to proceed bringing broadband and mobile communication access to rural and unserved areas. Citing reform to the Universal Service Fund as a means "to better serve rural America," Verizon recommended that a limit be set on the size of USF's high-cost fund, competitive bidding wars be employed to determine which company expand service to unserved areas, structure a "wire-center approach" model to replace statewide cost averaging, restructure how contributions to the USF are determined, and impose a deadline on the FCC for completion of their reform of inter-carrier compensation.

Unions such as the Communications Workers of America also endorsed the expansion the Unviersal Service Fund into supporting broadband.

On the other hand, discussions continued over whether the USF should be used to provide services such as broadband internet access. Plans to subsidize internet service providers has led to backlash from traditional telecommunications carriers. Traditional carriers argue that “the relevant provisions of the 1996 Act do not give the FCC carte blanche to play regulatory Robin Hood with their universal service contributions.”

In October 2011 the FCC formally proposed a "Connect America Fund" to address these and other concerns. Reform finally arrived on October 27, 2011, when the FCC approved a six-year transfer process that would transition money from the Universal Service Fund to a new $4.5 billion a year Connect America Fund that will support the expansion of broadband services to areas that don't have broadband access yet.

=== Recent history (2014-present) ===
In May 2018, the FCC moved $8 billion from a private bank to the US Treasury. This anticipated move caused an uproar from FCC Democratic commissioners who were concerned about the money being allocated to large corporations instead of the citizens. FCC commissioner, Jessica Rosenworcel stated that this move "sacrificed $50 million in annual interest that could have been used to support rural broadband, telemedicine & internet in schools." Although lawmakers and commissioners claimed that this move was unexpected, there was a letter previously written to the General Accountability Office (GAO) in January 2018 asking for a review on the plan to review the funds. The GAO claimed that the USF funds are not regulated as intensively as other government funds, so this move was an attempt to "improve management and oversight of the funds."

On May 21, 2018, the FCC issued an order that prohibited USF programs from buying equipment from Chinese telecommunications companies Huawei and ZTE. These companies are considered a risk to national security by American intelligence agencies. National Economic Council Director Larry Kudlow commented that the Trump Administration are ¨aware of security issues, sanctions issues, technology theft issues, et cetera.¨

== Components ==
=== High Cost ===
The largest and most complex of the four programs, the high cost program subsidizes telecommunications services in rural and remote areas which are more expensive to connect to networks. The program paid out $4.2 billion in subsidies to telecommunications companies in 2022, with a goal of making telecommunications affordable to rural and remote areas. The program has been criticized as wasteful, granting large sums of money to telecommunications companies while having little effect on access.

To determine eligibility for the high-cost program, each US state is broken into geographically into one or more study areas. A study area is defined by each study area's incumbent local exchange carrier, the modern successor of the local telephone monopoly. Incumbent local exchange carriers are sub-classified into those that operate on rate-of-return (ROR) model, and those subject to price caps (PC).

According to the 1996 Telecommunications Act, in order to be eligible for USF support, carriers must be legally designated as an Eligible Telecommunications Carrier (ETC) and take on a legal obligation to serve everyone in a particular area. State utility commissions are primarily responsible for defining both the number of eligible telecommunications carriers and the areas that they must serve.

Legal classifications of telephone carriers
Local versus long distance	Incumbent versus competitive	Regulatory approach	Eligibility for USF support
Local exchange carrier (LEC)	Incumbent local exchange carrier (ILEC)	Rate-of-return (ROR) Carrier	Eligible Telecommunications Carrier (ETC)
Local exchange carrier (LEC)	Incumbent local exchange carrier (ILEC)	Price Cap (PC) Carrier	Eligible Telecommunications Carrier (ETC)
Local exchange carrier (LEC)	Competitive local exchange carrier (CLEC)		Eligible Telecommunications Carrier (ETC)
Interexchange carrier (IXC)			

During the time of the Bell system and up through the 1980s, the traditional business model for an incumbent local exchange carrier was operating as a rate-of-return (ROR) carrier. These companies operated as regulated monopolies with profits limited to set percentage of total investment. As of 2019, companies that continue to operate as rate-of-return carriers are generally small, rural carriers serving 5% or less of households in the United States. About $2.5 billion in high-cost support goes to these rate-of-return carriers. Rate-of-return companies have two options for how to receive high-cost funds. First, they can opt for the traditional cost-accounting mechanism, under which the high cost will reimburse the company for their deployment costs plus an additional 10.25% return on investment. Alternatively, rate-of-return companies can choose model-based support, where costs are estimated in advance. The type of subsidy across rate-of-return study areas is split between the two support mechanisms, with about 40% of rate-of-return study areas operating under the traditional mechanism and 60% opting for model-based support.

In response to the criticism of the rate-of-return model, the FCC made efforts to encourage carriers to voluntarily move to a price cap (PC) approach. Beginning in 1990, the FCC began applying a Price Cap approach under which local exchange carriers would be allowed to adjust rates within the price cap without lengthy regulatory filings and deliberation.

==== Telephone funds ====
From 1998 to 2009, the high-cost fund supported the programs detailed below, which are aimed at telephone service. With the advent of the Connect America Fund, most of these programs have been phased out.

Legacy High cost programs:

- High Cost Loop Support (HCLS) - The longest running High Cost fund. According to the benchmark established in 1988, telephone companies with fixed costs of more than 115% of the national average would have 65% of excess costs covered, and fixed costs above 150% of the national average would receive a 75% subsidy. In dollar terms high cost loop support grew from $56 million in 1986 to $1.47 billion in 2010. Historically available to all telephone carriers, the fund's eligibility was later narrowed to rural telephone carriers. Safety Valve Support (SVS) is a supplement to HCLS. Safety Net Additive Support (SNAS) is another former supplement to HCLS.
- High Cost Model Support (HCMS) - Another former program.
- Local Switching Support (LSS) - Another former program.
- Long Term Support (LTS) - Another former program, ended in July 2004 and replaced by the ICLS.
- Interstate Common Line Support (ICLS) - Another former legacy High Cost fund going to rate-of-return carriers. For rate-of return carriers, costs to maintain infrastructure between the consumer and the local exchange are assumed to be 25% intrastate and 75% interstate. If federal subscriber line charges (SLC) and the bills paid by customers do not cover the companies' interstate common line costs, the ICLS will make up the difference. This original fund covered telephone service, but in practice covered infrastructure that could often also be used for broadband. As originally formulated, the fund could not be used for broadband-only service. Then in 2016 subsidies were expanded to also include broadband-only service, and renamed the Connect America Fund Broadband Loop Support (CAF BLS).
- Interstate Access Support (IAS) - Another former program, analogous to ICLS, but for Price Cap Carriers.

==== Connect America Fund ====
As part of the National Broadband Plan proposed in March 2010, the FCC proposed reorganizing the High Cost program into a new "Connect America Fund", which will include both voice and 4 Mbit/s internet connectivity. On October 27, 2011, the FCC approved a six-year transfer process that would transition the money from the Universal Service Fund High-Cost Program into the new $4.5 billion a year Connect America Fund, effectively putting an end to the USF High-Cost Fund by 2018.

Post-2010 High cost programs:

- Frozen High Cost Support (FHCS) - After the announcement of the Connect America Fund, the existing subsidies to Price Cap Carriers and to Competitive Local Exchange Carriers was frozen at 2011 levels.
- Intercarrier Compensation Recovery (ICC) - Another legacy High Cost fund. In 2011, the FCC announced its intention to gradually move intercarrier compensation to a Bill and keep model. Traditionally, local exchange carriers would charge other carriers for calls terminating through their network. The ICC was set up to partially replace the revenue that local exchange carriers previously collected from intercarrier compensation.
- Connect America Fund, Phase I Incremental Support - This program, also known simply as Incremental Support was a program aimed at accelerating broadband deployment active from 2012 to 2014. In 2012, during "Phase I" of the Connect America Fund, $115 million in subsidies were given out to build out broadband in 37 states, with $71.9 million going to Frontier Communications and $35 million to Century Link, with AT&T and Verizon declining to participate. In 2013, also during "Phase I", CenturyLink accepted another $54 million, and AT&T accepted $100 million.
- Connect America Fund Phase II Model - In March 2014, the FCC approved "Connect America Fund Phase II Model", moving $1.8 billion a year in funding from telephone subsidies to broadband, and clarifying the specifics of the funding process. Under the framework the FCC approved, incumbent carriers have priority access to subsidies, but if the funds are declined, the funds are allocated by a competitive bidding process. The FCC also proposed upping the minimum speed requirement from 4 Mbit/s to 10 Mbit/s. In May 2014, the 10th circuit court of appeals upheld the shift in funds in the face of a legal challenge by telephone companies.
- Connect America Fund Broadband Loop Support (CAF BLS) - Rate-of-return carriers that did elect to adopt ACAM II support were moved to the legacy mechanism CAF BLS.
- Connect America Fund Phase II Auction (CAFII Auc) - In 2018, the FCC conducted an auction awarding 103 companies a total of $1.49 billion over 10 years. This included all areas which were not covered by the previous Connect America Fund Phase II Model.
- Alternative Connect America Model (ACAM)/Revised Alternative Connect America Model (Revised ACAM) - In March 2016, the FCC unanimously voted to provide $20 billion over the next 10 years in "support for small carriers." The FCC will be offering the fund $20 billion over the next 10 years to support service in "high cost areas." This reform is a modernization of the program support of broadband in "high cost areas." It will target communities that most need support. The reform is made up of three main elements: "Modernizes Existing Universal Service Program for Rate-of-Return Carriers", "Create Two Paths to a 'Connect America Fund' for Rate-of Return Carriers" and "Increase Fiscal Responsibility in the Universal Service Fund."
- Alternative Connect America Model II (ACAM II)
- Enhanced Alternative Connect America Model (Enhanced ACAM) - In 2023 the FCC created this program for Rate-of-Return carriers to transition away from ACAM, Revised ACAM, ACAM II, and CAF BLS.
- Alaska Plan (AK Plan) - In 2016, the FCC established the Alaska plan, which offers fixed support of $150 million a year for 10 years (2017-2026), for $1.5 billion total to extend 10/1 Mbps broadband service to high cost areas in Alaska.
- Uniendo a Puerto Rico Fund/Connect USVI Fund consists of several programs specifically for the Puerto Rico and the Virgin Islands: Bringing Puerto Rico Together Fixed Support (PR Fixed), Bringing Puerto Rico Together Mobile Support (PR Mobile), United States Virgin Islands Fixed Support (USVI Fixed), and United States Virgin Islands Mobile Support (USVI Mobile).
- Rural Digital Opportunity Fund (RDOF) - In 2020, the FCC announced $9.2 billion in funding to build rural broadband networks. Recipients included LTD Broadband at $1.1 billion and SpaceX's Starlink at $885 million. LTD won bids to build broadband in 15 states, but had its application to be designated an Eligible Telecommunications Carrier rejected in 6 of those states, due to doubts about its ability to complete the buildout. The FCC later withdrew the RDOF funding for both LTD and Starlink.
- Rural Broadband Experiments (RBE)
- Mobility Fund Phase I - The Connect America Fund also included the Mobility Fund, which is given to wireless carriers who expand service to underserved areas. "Phase I" of the Mobility Fund offered $300 million for a September 2012 round of auctions, and "Phase II" of the Mobility Fund plans to give out $500 million in annual support.

==== Summary ====
Projected funding of all High Cost programs in 2024 (millions)
Name	Q1 2024 (Note: "Federal Universal Service Support Mechanisms Fund Size Projections for First Quarter 2024" (PDF). November 2, 2023.)	Q2 2024	Q3 2024 (Note: "Federal Universal Service Support Mechanisms Fund Size Projections for Third Quarter 2024" (PDF). May 2, 2024.)	Q4 2024 (Note: "Federal Universal Service Support Mechanisms Fund Size Projections for Fourth Quarter 2024" (PDF). August 2, 2024.)
Frozen Price Cap Carrier Support	$2.81	$2.81	$2.81	$2.81
Frozen Competitive Eligible Telecommunications Carrier Support	$91.59	$88.36	$88.35	$88.35
High Cost Loop Support	$61.35	$57.05	$56.05	$54.07
Connect America Fund/Intercarrier Compensation Support	$88.56	$88.56	$88.55	$88.55
Connect America Fund Broadband Loop Support	$224.37	$219.92	$258.39	$282.41
Connect America Fund Phase II	$4.92	$4.92	$4.92	$4.92
Connect America Fund Phase II Auction	$38.70	$38.70	$38.70	$36.60
Incremental Alternative Connect America Model Support	$45.07†	$0.82†	$0.82†	0.82†
Alternative Connect America Model	$2.67	$42.24	$42.21	$42.21
Alternative Connect America Model II	$68.55	$54.96	$54.94	$54.94
Enhanced Alternative Connect America Model	$293.61	$315.13	$315.13	$269.59 $45.54†
Alaska Plan Support	$32.08	$32.08	$32.08	$32.08
Uniendo a Puerto Rico/Connect United States Virgin Islands	$16.07	$12.77	$10.83	$10.83
Rural Digital Opportunity Fund	$152.01	$152.01	$151.91	$150.83
Rural Broadband Experiments	$0.52†	$0.50†	$0.39†	$0.39†
Mobility Fund Phase I	$6.78†	$6.78†	$6.78†	$6.78†
Prior period adjustment	-$6.60	-$30.37	$4.69	-$70.22
Administrative costs	$19.52	$21.78	$21.66	$21.97
Total quarterly funding	$1,090.21	$1,100.91	$1,171.22	$1,069.94

† Programs marked with a dagger symbol were funded from the High Cost account, so do not appear in the total funding projection.

==== Proposed High Cost programs ====
Some programs have been proposed, but not yet implemented.

- Mobility Fund Phase II - In 2017, new FCC chairman Ajit Varadaraj Pai promoted this fund as a way to expand 4G broadband access to rural areas. He wanted to bridge "the digital divide between rural and urban areas" by working on "expanding broadband options". Pai believes that there is waste occurring between the private and public sectors as private capital is already being given to areas in order to build out networks. However, some of these areas are still being subsidized. Pai intends to make sure that broadband accessibility is included in an infrastructure bill to come. The proposed program for $4.53 billion over 10 years, but was canceled in favor of the 5G Fund for Rural America.
- 5G Fund for Rural America (5G Fund) - A planned fund to build out 5G wireless service via a reverse auction.

=== Low income (Lifeline) ===
Since 1985, the Lifeline program has provided subsidies to low-income people to pay for phone service; first landlines, then cellphones, and as of 2016 it also offers the option of Internet connectivity. It provides a subsidy of up to $9.25 a month for Americans below 135% of the poverty line. Residents of Native American Indian and Alaska Native tribal communities may qualify for enhanced Lifeline assistance (up to an additional $25.00). The Lifeline program is limited to one discount per household. A "household" includes anyone living at the same address "who share income(s) and household expenses".

The Lifeline program has been subject to scrutiny and debate over the scope of the program. Issues include instituting checks for income eligibility and duplicate applications, whether the program should support broadband, whether the program should have a budget cap.

=== Rural health care ===
The Rural Health Care Support program "provides funding to eligible health care providers (HCPs) for telecommunications and broadband services necessary for the provision of health care."

The rural health care program provides subsidies to health care providers for telehealth and telemedicine services, typically by a combination of video-conferencing infrastructure and high speed Internet access, to enable doctors and patients in rural hospitals to access specialists in distant cities at affordable rates. The Rural Health Care Support Mechanism allows rural health care providers to pay rates for telecommunications services similar to those of their urban counterparts, making telehealth services affordable. Over $417 million has been allocated for the construction of 62 statewide or regional broadband telehealth networks in 42 states and three U.S. territories under the Rural Health Care Pilot Program. In 2022, the rural health care program paid out $488 million.

There are three components of the Rural Health Care Program: Telecommunications Program, HCF Program, Pilot Program.

"The Telecommunications Program (formerly known as the Primary Program) provides discounts for telecommunications services for eligible health care providers (HCPs)."

"The Healthcare Connect Fund (HCF) Program is the newest component of the Rural Health Care Program. The HCF Program will provide a 65 percent discount on eligible expenses related to broadband connectivity to both individual rural health care providers (HCPs) and consortia, which can include non-rural HCPs (if the consortium has a majority of rural sites)."

"The Pilot Program provides funding for up to 85 percent of eligible costs of the construction or implementation of statewide and/or regional broadband networks. There are 50 active projects involving hundreds of health care providers (HCPs)."

=== Schools and Libraries Program (E-Rate) ===
The E-Rate program provides subsidies for Internet access and general telecommunications services to schools and libraries. The subsidies typically pay 20% to 90% of costs based on need, with rural and low-income schools receiving the greatest subsidy. In 2022, the E-Rate program paid out $2.1 billion. Every year since 2010, the Wireline Competition Bureau announces the funding cap for the E-Rate program to adhere to the current needs of schools and libraries telecommunications.

"The Eligible Services List (ESL) for each funding year provides guidance on the eligibility of products and services under the Schools and Libraries Program." In 2015, USAC outlined two specific categories for grouping the ESL, and one category for miscellaneous services.

- "Category One
  - Data Transmission Services and Internet Access, and Voice Services
- Category two
  - Internal Connections, Managed Internal Broadband Services, and Basic Maintenance of Internal Connections
- Miscellaneous"

Starting in the 2011 funding year, the different types of schools eligible to receive benefits now include:

- "School on Tribal lands
- Schools that serve children with physical, cognitive, and behavioral disabilities
- Schools that serve children with medical needs
- Juvenile justice schools, where eligible
- Schools with 35 percent or more students eligible for the National School Lunch Program (NSLP)."

== Administration ==
=== Universal Service Administrative Company ===
The logo of the Universal Service Administrative Company

Following the Telecommunications Act of 1996 and the subsequent creation of the Universal Service Fund, the FCC designated the independent American nonprofit corporation named the "Universal Service Administrative Company" to manage the contribution of revenue to and distribution of funding from the Universal Service Fund. The Schools and Libraries Corporation and the Rural Health Care Corporation were merged into the USAC on January 1, 1999. The USAC is a fully owned legal subsidiary of the National Exchange Carrier Association, but is governed by a separate 20-person board of directors serving 3 year terms representing various stakeholder interests.

USAC reports quarterly revenue projections detailing what contributions are expected and detailing what actions are taken in the expansion and bolstering of universal service. The USAC receives contributions from all companies providing interstate and international telephone and Voice over Internet Protocol (VoIP) service. Contributors send payments based on projected quarterly earnings. The FCC does not require companies to charge their customers for these contributions – this funding decision is left up to the individual companies. This revenue is deposited into a central fund, from which the USAC distributes money to the four central services at the core of the USF: High Cost, Low Income, Schools and Libraries, and Rural Health Care.

"The USAC collects revenue data from USF contributors on the FCC Form 499-A (Annual Telecommunications Reporting Worksheet) and FCC Form 499-Q (Quarterly Telecommunications Reporting Worksheet)." The USAC is responsible for estimating how much money is needed for the USF program. The USAC provides a "demand filing," to the Federal Communications Commission (FCC) each quarter in its FCC Filings.

While the USAC cannot act without Congressional approval, it can make recommendations. USAC recommendations have resulted in expanding telecommunication resources, particularly broadband Internet and mobile access to schools and libraries, and recognizing VoIP as a form of interstate and international communication, which requires those companies providing VoIP services to contribute to the USF.

=== Federal Communications Commission ===
The FCC oversees the USAC's administration of the Universal Service Fund, and institutes reforms as it sees fit. Although the fund is limited by the scope of US law, (mainly the 1996 Telecommunications Act) the FCC has played a part in making several changes to the fund, including shifting funds from the high cost program towards broadband expansion. Under the FCC, there is an Enforcement Bureau that investigates and pursues the violators of the Act of 1996 and any Commissions rules.

=== National Exchange Carrier Association ===
The National Exchange Carrier Association (NECA) collects rate-of-return carrier cost data, does initial validation, and calculates how much funding carriers are eligible for and forwards all this information to the USAC.

The NECA is also the legal parent of the USAC, but maintains a separate board.

=== Federal-state joint boards ===
Beginning in the 1980s, the Federal-State Joint Board on Jurisdictional Separations made recommendations for the establishment of a universal service fund. They issued Monitoring Reports overseeing the early Universal Service fund from 1987 to 1997.

The Federal-State Joint Board on Universal Service was established in March 1996 to make recommendations on the implementation of the universal service provisions of the 1996 Telecommunications Act. This board has taken over preparing Monitoring Reports concerning the Universal Service Fund.

== Funding ==
Currently, all telecommunications companies that provide service between states, including long-distance companies, local telephone companies, wireless telephone companies, paging companies, and payphone providers, are legally required to contribute to the federal Universal Service Fund. Carriers providing international services also must contribute to the Universal Service Fund. These providers contribute to the fund "based on their interstate and international end-user telecommunications revenues." On a quarterly basis, the Universal Service Administrative Company submits projected demand for Universal Service funding and projected contribution base to the Federal Communications Commission Office of Managing Director (OMD). There is then a 14-day public review, after which the rate is finalized. As of the third quarter of 2024, telecommunication companies were required to contribute 34.4% of their interstate revenue to the fund.

While many providers bundle phone calls within a state (intrastate), calls between states (interstate), and calls to between countries (international) into a single monthly fee, the USF fee does not apply to revenue generated from calls within a single state. Therefore, phone companies apply the USF fee only to the interstate and international revenue. To accomplish this, they can opt to apply the USF fee to the "safe-harbor percentage" of assumed interstate revenue (64.9% for VoIP, 37.1% for cellular service). Alternatively, companies can conduct a traffic study demonstrating the percentage of interstate usage (PIU) and submit it to the Universal Service Administrative Company.

While not required to do so, most telephone companies bill their customers with a separate line item for the USF fee. The contributions are collected by the Universal Service Administrative Company and disbursed towards four programs that the federal USF supports, as directed by the FCC. Universal Service charges should not be confused with what are sometimes referred to in telephone company bills as "Federal Subscriber Line" charges, which are access fees charged by telecommunications companies, not the local or federal government.

Universal Service Fund quarterly collections (millions)
	Schools and libraries	Rural Health Care	High Cost	Low income	Contribution factor
Q4 2000	373	3	660	152	5.7%
Q4 2001	522	4	699	117	6.9%
Q4 2002	552	9	841	184	9.3%
Q4 2003	542	7	815	182	9.2%
Q4 2004	391	9	845	212	8.9%
Q4 2005	530	11	889	202	10.2%
Q4 2006	481	13	922	171	9.1%
Q4 2007	505	28	1102	222	11.0%
Q4 2008	551	52	1117	200	11.4%
Q4 2009	553	50	971	288	12.3%
Q4 2010	552	17	1088	312	12.9%
Q4 2011	560	22	1079	532	15.3%
Q4 2012	578	33	1124	664	17.4%
Q4 2013	582	58	1108	406	15.6%
Q4 2014	595	60	1120	381	16.1%
Q4 2015	610	75	1110	326	16.7%
Q4 2016	403	152	1136	392	17.4%
Q4 2017	499	108	1146	290	18.8%
Q4 2018	392	188	1199	279	20.1%
Q4 2019	422	148	1364	250	25.0%
Q4 2020	553	151	1249	244	27.1%
Q4 2021	594	153	1137	231	29.1%
Q4 2022	609	0	1085	211	28.9%
Q4 2023	652	97	1067	263	34.5%

=== Declining revenues ===
The rapidly changing interstate and international telecommunications markets can quickly and unpredictably bring about changes in USF funding levels. Dorothy Attwood of the FCC Wireline Competition Bureau stated, "One striking development that we've witnessed in the interstate marketplace is the steady decline of interstate revenues. Although traditional long-distance revenues grew consistently between 1984 and 1997, they're now in a period of steady decline". She pointed out that competition in the interstate long-distance market, wireless substitution, and bundling of service packages that blur traditional service categories are all reducing revenues that serve to finance the USF. Service providers simply transferred the cost to customers in the form of a long-distance surcharge to make up for reduced revenue. While the expenditures of the USF have increased since its inception, in part due to expansion of support paid to competitive providers, the revenues on which contributions are made – interstate and international telecommunications revenues – have become increasingly more difficult for contributors to identify as a result of evolution of services offered. Overall revenues reported by telecommunications companies have steadily increased, if information service revenues are included. However, the revenues for these services are no longer subject to contribution.

Some have raised concerns about the future funding of the USF; despite falling taxable revenues, the size of the fund has increased from $1.2 billion in collections at 5.7% in 4Q 2000, to $2.2 billion in 4Q 2014 at 16.1%.

== State universal service funds ==
A Tax Foundation summary of total taxes and fees paid on wireless service in each state as of July 2016

Many US states have their own universal service funds, with budget and administration independent of the much larger federal fund. States with their own programs may have their own eligibility guidelines. As of 2019, 42 states had universal service funds in addition to the federal program, totaling $1.7 billion in disbursements in 2017. Those without state funds consisted of Alabama, Delaware, Florida, Hawaii, Massachusetts, New Jersey, New Hampshire, Tennessee, and Virginia.

To support the state programs, many states impose a fee on intrastate calling revenue (the portion not falling under the federal USF fee).

== Waste and fraud ==
The issue of waste and fraud, as with many government programs, has been addressed as well. Gilroy stated, "The ability to ensure that only eligible services are funded, that funding is disbursed at the proper level of discount, that alleged services have been received, and the integrity of the competitive bidding process is upheld have been questioned". Improved auditing of particularly the E-rate program has been addressed.

There have been multiple cases of waste and fraud throughout disbursement of subsidies from the Universal Service Fund. There is some concern on the lag time between application, approval, and actual receipt of funds. In terms of fraud, some school officials have been bribed by contractors working with corporations so that they use subsidies to purchase computer equipment from said corporation. In addition, some beneficiaries inaccurately report costs to inflate their subsidies amount. In terms of waste, some equipment subsidized by the USF has been left unused for several years.

An investigation into potential fraud in 2004 revealed that contractors working with Hewlett-Packard bribed school officials. Hewlett-Packard wanted the schools to use subsidies provided by the fund to purchase computer equipment from Hewlett-Packard. The second example of fraud was when "Sandwich Isles Communication purposely inflated and inaccurately reported money to receive inflated subsidies."

Critics continue to raise concerns in regards to the wastefulness of the fund. For example, "$5 million worth of equipment purchased by Chicago public schools with E-rate funds was left unused in a warehouse for years." Lastly, a problem that has plagued the program is the long lag time between the overall application of the programs and the approval.

The USF has some issues in dealing with insufficient controls over determining who qualifies for funding, and limited auditing practices that are supposed to ensure that telecommunication companies are not overpaying or underpaying their dues to the fund.

The USF is able to reward those living in rural or impoverished areas who are capable of paying the entire cost of personal telecommunication services. Critics argue that inconsistent and asymmetrical audits allow for wealthy consumers to avoid triggering some USF financial burdens. Wealthy landowners in rural estates decide to utilize USF subsidies and pay a fraction of what they can realistically afford.

Critics note that reimbursing carriers on a “‘cost-plus’ basis” creates “incentives to increase rather than decreas[e] costs” By reimbursing “carriers for the full cost of infrastructure development plus 11.25 percent of those costs in profit,” the fund may expose itself to exploitation.

== Proposed changes ==
Debate over the Universal Service Fund has consistently involved the scope of the funding, which technology types and companies should fund the program, which groups should be eligible for benefits, and the need to clean up waste and fraud in the program.

=== Legislative bills ===
- A draft proposal of the Telecommunications Act of 2005 was the subject of hearings in Congress. The proposal outlined a significant restructuring of the Telecommunications Act of 1996, ultimately the House of Representatives passed a bill, the Communications Opportunity, Promotion, and Enhancement Act of 2006 (COPE – H.R.5252.RS, S. 2686). The bill was sent from the House to the Senate, where subsequent readings left it awaiting a legislative action. Under the proposed restructuring of the Telecommunications Act of 1996, greater emphasis on the wide availability of broadband and mobile access would be considered. Additionally, consideration of revenue contribution to the Universal Service Fund would be radically revised, given that the creation of obligatory broadband and mobile communication access would require a wide range of broadband, mobile, and Voice over Internet Protocol (VoIP) service providers to contribute a portion of their revenue to the fund. Lastly, the Act urged an FCC consideration of the universal service structure. The bill was not passed.
- In January 2007, Senator Ted Stevens (R-AK) sponsored a bill (the Universal Service for Americans Act, S. 101) that would increase universal service tax base to include broadband ISPs and VoIP providers, to fund broadband deployment in rural and low-income regions of the country. This bill was referred to committee, but as no further action was taken on it by the 110th Congress, the bill never became law.
- On February 13, 2009, Congressman Bob Latta (R-OH) introduced H.Res. 176 which states that, "in order to continue aggressive growth in our Nation's telecommunications and technology industries, the United States Government should 'Get Out of the Way and Stay Out of the Way'." The bill died in committee.
- On July 22, 2010, the Universal Service Reform Act of 2010 was introduced by Representatives Boucher (D-Va) and Terry (R-NE). The measure is intended to improve and modernize the USF by reining in the size of the fund and promoting broadband deployment.
- On July 2, 2021 the Funding Affordable Internet with Reliable (FAIR) Contributions Act (S. 2427) was introduced by Roger Wicker (R-MS) to study the possibility of collecting USF contributions from edge providers. Wicker reintroduced the bill in the 118th congress (S. 856). The bill was endorsed by United States Telecom Association and NTCA - The Rural Broadband Association.
- On November 15, 2023 the Lowering Broadband Costs for Consumers Act of 2023 (S. 3321) was introduced by Markwayne Mullin (R-OK) and Mark Kelly (D-AZ) to require internet service providers and edge providers to contribute to the Universal Service Fund. The bill was supported by the United States Telecom Association and NTCA - The Rural Broadband Association.
- On May 1, 2024 the Promoting Affordable Connectivity Act (S. 4208) was introduced by John Fetterman (D-PA) to permanently extend the Affordable Connectivity Program by merging it into the USF and requiring internet service providers and edge providers to pay into the USF.

=== Changes to funding sources ===
Proposals have been made to increase the number of sources from which universal service fund is collected. Suggestions include requiring additional companies pay into the USF such internet service providers, large technology companies, including intrastate telephone services (calls within single states), or increasing contribution requirements from wireless communication providers.

Alternatively, there have also been suggestions to move all funding to regular congressional appropriations.

=== Capping expenditures ===
In 2019, the FCC considered instituting a spending cap on the USF fund. The measure was supported by some groups, such as the Technology Policy Institute. On the other hand the proposed cap was criticised by Ron Wyden among other US Senators.

=== Classification of internet service providers ===
Over the years, disputes about legal classification of internet service providers as either common carriers or information services has had implications for the Universal Service fund, as the FCC has stronger legal authority to regulate common carriers.

Around 2014, there was discussion about reclassifying broadband under Title II of the 1996 Telecommunications Act so the FCC would have the authority to enforce Net Neutrality. Opponents of the move argued that this reclassification eventually be followed by requiring ISPs to pay into the USF as a new source of revenue for the fund. The FCC has made clear that the change does give it the power to do so, but will not require contributions on broadband Internet access revenues at this time, as the FCC will forbear from the contribution requirements in Section 254(d) of the Communications Act.

In 2017, the FCC reversed its decision and reclassified ISPs as information services. Then in 2023, the FCC changed once again classified ISPs under Title II. The FCC has continued to exempt broadband providers from Universal Service fund fees, but groups such as NTCA - The Rural Broadband Association continue to push for USF fees to be expanded to ISPs.

== Court cases ==
Some telecommunications policy experts strongly dispute the delegation of authority to the USAC, arguing that the FCC ignores challenges to USAC policy from telephone carriers for fear that either an explicit endorsement or rejection would open up the FCC to lawsuits.

Because ISP's and traditional telecommunications carriers often provide similar services, the USF may “violate[] the pro-competitive precepts of the 1996 Act." These concerns and others, as well as longstanding opposition to the Universal Service Fund from government watchdogs and fiscal conservatives, inspired litigation in 2023 arguing that the fund violates the U.S. Constitution. The firm Consumers' Research filed lawsuits in the 5th, 6th, and 11th circuits. The Sixth Circuit Court of Appeals first ruled in Consumers' Research v. Federal Communications Commission that the fund is constitutional, but that ruling has been appealed to the U.S. Supreme Court. In the mean time, the Fifth Circuit has ruled that it is unconstitutional. This combination of rulings on legality of the USF has resulted in a circuit split. The Supreme Court accepted two petitions for review from Consumers' Research's cases, consolidating them into one case, FCC v. Consumers' Research, heard during its 2024-2025 term. The Supreme Court ruled in June 2025 in a 6-3 decision that the Universal Service Fund was constitutional.

In 2008, Todd Heath sued Wisconsin Bell for overcharging schools and libraries beyond the "lowest corresponding price" required by the Telecommunications Act of 1996. In the 2025 case Wisconsin Bell, Inc. v. United States ex rel. Heath, the Supreme Court ruled that because E-Rate program is partially funded by government contributions, such overcharges can be prosecuted under the False Claims Act of 1863.

== See also ==
- E-Rate
- National broadband plans from around the world
- Rural electrification
- National Exchange Carrier Association
