= Andrew Oldham =

American judge (born 1978)

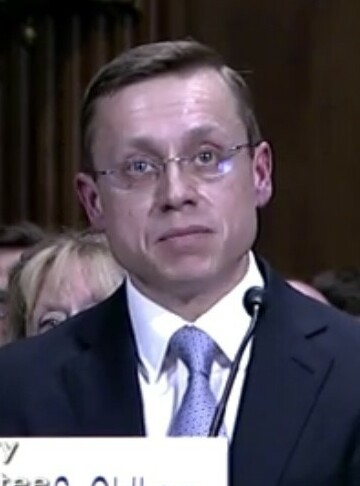
- Oldham in 2018

Judge of the United States Court of Appeals for the Fifth Circuit
- Incumbent
- Assumed office July 19, 2018
- Appointed by: Donald Trump
- Preceded by: Edward C. Prado

Personal details
- Born: Andrew Stephen Oldham; 1978 (age 47–48) Richmond, Virginia, U.S.
- Education: University of Virginia (BA); University of Cambridge (MPhil); Harvard University (JD)

Andrew Stephen Oldham (born 1978) is an American lawyer and jurist serving as a United States circuit judge of the United States Court of Appeals for the Fifth Circuit. He was appointed in 2018 by President Donald Trump. Prior to his appointment, Oldham was the general counsel to Texas Governor Greg Abbott and an associate at the law firm Kellogg, Hansen, Todd, Figel & Frederick.

== Early life and education ==
Oldham was born in 1978 in Richmond, Virginia. He graduated from the University of Virginia in 2001 with a Bachelor of Arts with highest honors. He then studied at the University of Cambridge on a Harry S. Truman Scholarship, receiving a Master of Philosophy with first-class honours in 2002. He then attended Harvard Law School, where he was an editor of the Harvard Journal of Law and Public Policy and a semi-finalist in the Ames Moot Court Competition. He graduated in 2005 with a Juris Doctor, magna cum laude.

== Career ==
After law school, Oldham was a law clerk to judge David B. Sentelle of the United States Court of Appeals for the District of Columbia Circuit from 2005 to 2006. He worked as an attorney-adviser in the United States Department of Justice's Office of Legal Counsel from 2006 to 2008, as part of the George W. Bush Administration. He then clerked for Justice Samuel Alito of the United States Supreme Court from 2008 to 2009, where he was a co-clerk with future federal judge Michael H. Park.

Oldham entered private practice in 2009 at the law firm Kellogg, Hansen, Todd, Figel & Frederick in Washington, D.C. His practice focused on appellate litigation in federal courts of appeals throughout the country. He then served in the Office of the Solicitor General of Texas as Deputy Solicitor General, where he represented Texas in federal courts across the country. In 2015, Oldham wrote an amicus curiae brief in support of Abbott's successful challenge of President Barack Obama's Deferred Action for Childhood Arrivals executive order.

Prior to becoming a judge, Oldham served as general counsel to Texas governor Greg Abbott, where he advised Abbott on a range of issues under federal and state law and managed litigation in which the Governor was an interested party.

Abbott appointed Oldham as general counsel to replace Jimmy Blacklock, who left to take a seat on the Supreme Court of Texas.

Oldham has been an adjunct professor at the University of Texas School of Law since 2019. He has been a member of the Federalist Society since 2002.

== Federal judicial service ==
On February 12, 2018, President Donald Trump announced his intent to nominate Oldham to an undetermined seat on the United States Court of Appeals for the Fifth Circuit. On February 15, 2018, his nomination was sent to the Senate. President Trump nominated Oldham to the seat vacated by Judge Edward C. Prado, who became the United States Ambassador to Argentina. On April 25, 2018, a hearing on his nomination was held before the Senate Judiciary Committee. On May 24, 2018, his nomination was reported out of committee by an 11–10 vote. On July 17, 2018, the Senate invoked cloture on his nomination by a 50–49 vote. On July 18, 2018, his nomination was confirmed by a 50–49 vote. He received his judicial commission on July 19, 2018.

=== Notable opinions ===
==== Consumers' Research v. FCC (2024) ====
In July 2024, Oldham wrote the majority opinion for the Fifth Circuit, sitting en banc, in Consumers' Research v. FCC, holding that the funding mechanism for the Universal Service Fund violated the nondelegation doctrine because Congress had delegated taxing authority to the Federal Communications Commission, which had in turn sub-delegated it to a private nonprofit administrator.

The ruling deepened a circuit split with the Sixth and Eleventh Circuits, which had rejected similar challenges. In a March 21, 2025, Washington Post column, George Will praised the opinion and wrote that Oldham "merits promotion to a higher court." On June 27, 2025, the Supreme Court reversed 6–3 in FCC v. Consumers' Research, upholding the funding mechanism and rejecting Oldham's nondelegation analysis.

==== United States v. Sanders (2025) ====
In March 2025, Oldham wrote a concurring opinion in United States v. Sanders, the direct criminal appeal of Thomas Sanders, who was convicted of kidnapping and murdering a 12-year-old child and sentenced to death on two counts. The panel majority, written by Judge Priscilla Richman and joined by Judge Leslie H. Southwick, vacated one of the two sentences on double jeopardy grounds and otherwise affirmed. President Joe Biden had commuted Sanders' death sentences to life without parole on December 23, 2024, as part of a broader grant of clemency to 37 of the 40 inmates on federal death row.

In his concurrence, Oldham wrote that "questions have arisen about the flurry of last-minute pardons issued by the Biden Administration," noting that "at least one was issued by mistake" and that "some or all were allegedly effectuated via autopen." He cited William Blackstone's Commentaries on the Laws of England for the proposition that pardons obtained when a sovereign was "deceived" or "misinformed" were historically void, and surveyed the history of the pardon power dating to Anglo-Saxon practice. Oldham also questioned whether the Federal Death Penalty Act permitted the president to commute a death sentence to life without parole, as opposed to imposing some other authorized sentence on remand.

The concurrence drew attention because it raised the baseless autopen and competency theories then being pressed publicly by President Donald Trump and acting U.S. Attorney Ed Martin, who had sent letters to former Biden aides questioning whether Biden was competent when he issued clemency in his final days in office. A 2005 Office of Legal Counsel opinion under President George W. Bush had concluded that a president's use of an autopen to sign a document does not affect its legal validity. Biden later told The New York Times that he had made every clemency decision personally and that aides used the autopen to execute pre-approved lists. The Fifth Circuit denied panel rehearing on July 29, 2025.

== See also ==
- Donald Trump Supreme Court candidates
- List of law clerks for the eighth seat of the Supreme Court of the United States

Legal offices
Preceded by Edward C. Prado	Judge of the United States Court of Appeals for the Fifth Circuit; 2018–present	Incumbent
