= United States Telecom Association =

American trade organization

- The logo of the United States Telecom Association
- Abbreviation: USTelecom
- Formation: May 1, 1897; 129 years ago
- Type: Trade Association
- Headquarters: 601 New Jersey Ave, NW Suite 600; Washington, D.C., United States
- Members: Communications carriers and small cooperatives
- Chair: Jeff England, Vice President & Chief Financial Officer, Silver Star Communications
- Chair of the Leadership Committee: Josh Descant, Chief Executive Officer, REV
- President and CEO: Jonathan Spalter
- Website: www.ustelecom.org
- Formerly called: United States Telephone Association

The United States Telecom Association (USTelecom) is an organization that represents telecommunications-related businesses based in the United States. As a trade association, it represent the converged interests of the country's telecommunications industry. Member companies represent a diverse set of communications-related businesses, including those that provide wireless, Internet, cable television, long distance, local exchange, and voice services. Members include large publicly traded communications carriers as well as small telephone cooperatives that serve only a few hundred customers in urban and rural areas. The organization was founded as the Independent Telephone Association of America in 1897, and represented the telecommunication industry of North America that was not affiliated with the Bell System led by the American Telephone and Telegraph Company (AT&T).

== History ==
The United States Telecom Association (USTelecom) was founded in Chicago, Illinois, on May 17, 1897, when a group of independent telephone company executives convened at the Palmer House to create an organization called the Independent Telephone Association. After the 1894 expiration of Alexander Graham Bell's principal telephone patent, thousands of independent telephone companies sprouted in the telephone industry in the last decade of the 19th century. These companies organized to promote growth of their industry and develop alliances on issues that crossed state lines. Renamed as the United States Independent Telephone Association in 1915, the organization focused on educational programs for its members, standardization efforts and representing its members on relevant policy issues addressed by the federal government. For instance, as the telephone industry grew, Congress enacted new laws, including the Communications Act of 1934 that established the Federal Communications Commission (FCC), and the Telecommunications Act of 1996, which among a variety of initiatives, set a universal service goal of connecting all Americans via affordable, accessible telecommunications services. To meet the requirements of the new statutes, telephone companies worked through the association to educate members, develop common policy positions and interface with policymakers in Congress and at the FCC.

Year	Name of Association
1897	Independent Telephone Association of America (ITAA)
1903	Independent Telephone Association of the United States of America (ITAUSA)
1904	National Independent Telephone Association of the United States (NITAUS)
1909	National Independent Telephone Association (NITA)
1915	United States Independent Telephone Association (USITA)
1983	United States Telephone Association (USTA)
1999	United States Telecom Association (USTelecom)

In modern times, USTelecom also advocates on behalf of the telecommunications industry to Courts, the White House, and the media.

== Organization and leadership ==
As an American not-for-profit corporation, USTelecom is governed by a 19-member Board of Directors and an 18-member Leadership Committee. The Board of Directors is composed of member company executives that have been nominated by members of the Leadership Committee. The Leadership Committee comprises executives from small-to-mid-sized telecom companies that are members of the association. As of October 2025, the Chair is Jeff England, Vice President & Chief Financial Officer, Silver Star Communications, and the Chair of the Leadership Committee is Josh Descant, Chief Executive Officer, REV. Since January 2017, Jonathan Spalter has served as President & CEO of USTelecom.

The association offers three different categories of paid membership:

- Carrier Members - Companies that provide local telecommunications exchange and access services to residential, business and other customers in the United States.
- Supplier Members - Companies that sell goods and services to the telecommunications industry.
- International Members - Companies providing telecommunications services outside the United States and U.S. territories.

USTelecom serves as a forum in which member companies can coordinate advocacy of particular policy issues important to their companies and the telecommunications industry via the association's seven standing Committees and other ad hoc Committees.

Standing Committees:

- Regulatory Affairs – Member companies develop policy and engage in advocacy before the FCC and other relevant American federal agencies.
- Governmental Affairs – Member companies collaborate in their advocacy to lawmakers on mutually-beneficial policy issues.
- External Affairs – These committee members develop and execute media and public relations strategies.
- Tax Policy – Members develop the association's positions on tax and financial policy relevant to the telecommunications industry.
- Engineering & Technology Policy – Members develop the association's position on a variety of technology issues and standards including numbering, IP services, open source software, network neutrality, DPI, and emerging technologies.
- Intellectual Property and Privacy – Members develop the association's position on issues surrounding the ownership and distribution of content and protection of consumer information.
- National Security and Public Safety – These committee members gather to inform and shape policies addressing cybersecurity, national security, emergency preparedness, and pandemic planning.

Notable Ad Hoc Committees:

- Universal Service
- Intercarrier compensation
- Consumer protection
- Video competition

== Member education ==
Beyond representing member companies' interests to legislators, the administration, the FCC, and in courts, USTelecom conducts member education programs through webinars, conferences and leadership development programs. Other departments in the association dually support these educational and advocacy programs through the distribution of research briefs and industry-relevant newsletters.

== See also ==
- Federal Communications Commission
- IPTV
- Network Neutrality
- Universal Service
