= FCC v. Consumers' Research =

- Supreme Court of the United States

Argued March 26, 2025 Decided June 27, 2025
- Full case name: Federal Communications Commission, et al. v. Consumers' Research, et al.; Schools, Health and Libraries Broadband Coalition v. Consumers' Research
- Docket nos.: 24-354; 24-422
- Citations: 606 U.S. 656 (more)
- Argument: Oral argument

Questions presented
- 1. Whether Congress violated the nondelegation doctrine by authorizing the FCC to determine the amount that service providers must contribute to the Universal Service Fund; 2. Whether the FCC violated the nondelegation doctrine by using a private company to determine the fund's contribution rates.

Holding
- The Universal Service Fund does not violate the nondelegation doctrine.

Court membership
- Chief Justice John Roberts Associate Justices Clarence Thomas · Samuel Alito; Sonia Sotomayor · Elena Kagan; Neil Gorsuch · Brett Kavanaugh; Amy Coney Barrett · Ketanji Brown Jackson

Case opinions
- Majority: Kagan, joined by Roberts, Sotomayor, Kavanaugh, Barrett, Jackson
- Concurrence: Kavanaugh
- Concurrence: Jackson
- Dissent: Gorsuch, joined by Thomas, Alito

Federal Communications Commission v. Consumers' Research, 606 U.S. 656 (2025), is a decision of the United States Supreme Court, concerning a challenge by Consumers' Research against the Federal Communications Commission's Universal Service Fund program. Consumers' Research argued that the program violated the nondelegation doctrine. The Supreme Court heard the case following contradictory rulings on the matter by the Fifth, Sixth, and Eleventh Circuits.

== Background ==
The Federal Communications Commission (FCC) administers a universal service program, as authorized by Congress in the Telecommunications Act of 1996. All telephone service customers in the United States pay a monthly fee, and the resulting Universal Service Fund is used by the FCC to subsidize discounts for financially disadvantaged subscribers, build network infrastructure in underserved areas, connect rural hospitals, and support computer labs at public schools and libraries. The fund's budget had reached as high as $10 billion per year by the 2020s. The fund is administered by a quasi-private entity called the Universal Service Administration Company (USAC), which determines how much money must be contributed to the fund by telephone service providers.

The Universal Service Fund has generated controversy among government watchdogs and fiscal conservatives due to its apparent waste. Critics have questioned whether billions of dollars per year are still necessary to advance the FCC's goals of filling gaps in the American telephone network and assisting disadvantaged consumers. A Government Accountability Office (GOA) report from 2017 noted that the program had several flaws – the most serious of which was that there were insufficient controls over who actually received funding, with limited auditing to ensure that companies were paying the correct amount into the fund. The GAO report notes that the White House's Office of Management and Budget "observed that USF funds do not enjoy the same rigorous management practices and regulatory safeguards as funds for other federal programs." Critics allege that the funds are allocated inefficiently among various types of communications networks, with a focus on landline telephone service as opposed to others that are more popular with, or needed by, modern consumers.

Other critics have accused the FCC of forwarding funds to private corporations to build network infrastructure, but with insufficient oversight of whether those companies use the funds in the public interest. There have been several documented cases of fraud in the use of such funds, both by private companies that build infrastructure, and by the recipients of government assistance. By the late 2010s, the universal service program had become intertwined with security concerns, as policymakers debated whether its funds should subsidize telecommunications equipment purchases from Chinese companies and other foreign firms considered security risks.

In 2023, Consumers' Research, a free-market advocacy organization, filed suit in the Fifth, Sixth, Eleventh, and District of Columbia Circuit Courts on behalf of telephone consumers in each respective region. The group claimed that the FCC's universal service program should be struck down as an unconstitutional delegation of fundraising functions from Congress to the commission, and that allowing the USAC to administer the program's finances was an unconstitutional transfer of government power to the private sector.

== Circuit Court rulings ==
The Sixth Circuit proceeding was the first in which a ruling was reached, with that court reviewing the complaint in March 2023. The court focused on the legality of the FCC's universal service program as authorized by law in the Telecommunications Act of 1996. Section 254 of that act outlines the fee collection and budgetary oversight requirements of the Universal Service Fund. The use of the quasi-private USAC had already been held as constitutional by the D.C. Circuit in 2012.

Given the "intelligible principle" laid out in the 1996 Act, Congress had intended the FCC to act as it then did in subsequent years when administering the universal service program, and those clear instructions from Congress negated arguments about delegation of power to the commission. Per Supreme Court precedent, due to the complexity of governmental functions, no constitutional violation exists "so long as Congress provides an administrative agency with standards guiding its actions such that a court could ascertain whether the will of Congress has been obeyed." The universal service charge for consumers was also found to be a fee and not a tax, again reducing the applicability of the nondelegation doctrine because only the direct collection of taxes by the government is a matter of constitutional authority. Thus, the Sixth Circuit rejected the arguments by Consumers' Research about the constitutionality of the FCC's universal service program.

In September 2023, the Fifth Circuit also rejected the Consumers' Research delegation argument, though some judges questioned whether the FCC's universal service program may still violate the Constitution, on the grounds that the Telecommunications Act of 1996 neglected to set clear limits on how much money the commission could raise. The Eleventh Circuit also rejected the Consumers' Research argument in December 2023, concluding that the universal service program was legal per the instructions from Congress in the 1996 Act.

== Supreme Court opinion ==
In late 2023, Consumers' Research appealed its losses at the Fifth and Sixth Circuits to the United States Supreme Court, with additional arguments on separation of powers, oversight of government funds, and the FCC's ability to manage such a budget under the major questions doctrine. Recent jurisprudence at the Supreme Court, which was leaning toward limiting the powers of Executive Branch agencies, inspired the appeal in which Consumers' Research sought to limit the spending powers of the FCC.

The Supreme Court showed early skepticism toward the Consumers' Research argument. The court rejected certiorari for the Sixth Circuit decision in June 2024. The court granted certiorari for the Fifth Circuit ruling and heard arguments in March 2025. The Supreme Court overturned the Fifth Circuit's ruling 6–3 on June 27, 2025. Commentators concluded that the court was uninterested in strengthening the nondelegation doctrine as a means to curb agency power.
