= Edward C. Prado =

American judge and ambassador (born 1947)

Edward Prado
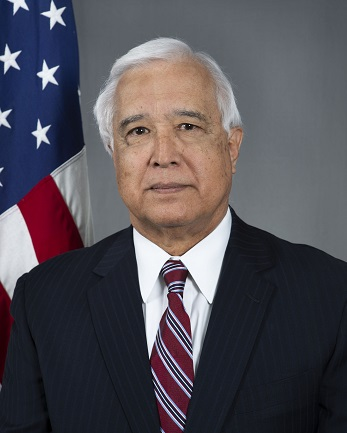

51st United States Ambassador to Argentina
- In office May 16, 2018 – January 20, 2021
- President: Donald Trump
- Preceded by: Noah Mamet
- Succeeded by: Marc Stanley

Judge of the United States Court of Appeals for the Fifth Circuit
- In office May 5, 2003 – April 2, 2018
- Appointed by: George W. Bush
- Preceded by: Robert Manley Parker
- Succeeded by: Andrew Oldham

Judge of the United States District Court for the Western District of Texas
- In office March 30, 1984 – May 13, 2003
- Appointed by: Ronald Reagan
- Preceded by: Clyde Frederick Shannon Jr.
- Succeeded by: Xavier Rodriguez

United States Attorney for the Western District of Texas
- In office 1981–1984
- President: Ronald Reagan
- Preceded by: Jamie Boyd
- Succeeded by: Helen Eversberg

Personal details
- Born: Edward Charles Prado; June 7, 1947 (age 79) San Antonio, Texas, U.S.
- Party: Republican
- Education: San Antonio College (AA); University of Texas, Austin (BA, JD)

Military service
- Allegiance: United States
- Branch/service: United States Army
- Years of service: 1972–1987
- Rank: Captain
- Unit: Reserves

Edward Charles Prado (born June 7, 1947) is an American diplomat who is a former United States ambassador to Argentina from 2018 to 2021. He is a former United States circuit judge of the United States Court of Appeals for the Fifth Circuit.

== Background ==
Prado was born in San Antonio, Texas on June 7, 1947. He received an Associate of Arts degree from San Antonio College in 1967. He received a Bachelor of Arts degree from the University of Texas at Austin in May 1969 and received his Juris Doctor in 1972 from University of Texas School of Law.

Prado served as an assistant district attorney in the Bexar County District Attorney's office. Thereafter, in 1976 he served in the Federal Public Defender's office in the Western District of Texas as an assistant public defender. In 1980, Prado was appointed to serve as a Texas state district judge in Bexar County. In 1981, President Ronald Reagan appointed Prado to serve as the United States Attorney for the Western District of Texas. He served as US Attorney until becoming a federal judge in March 1984.

== Federal judicial service ==
President Ronald Reagan nominated Prado to the United States District Court for the Western District of Texas to a seat vacated by Judge C. Frederick Shannon, Jr. He was confirmed by the Senate on March 30, 1984 and received his commission on the same day. He remained on that court until he was elevated to the court of appeals in May 2003.

Prado was nominated on February 6, 2003 by President George W. Bush to fill a vacancy on the Fifth Circuit created by Judge Robert Manley Parker, who retired on November 1, 2002. He was confirmed by the United States Senate on May 1, 2003, just under three months after his nomination. Prado received his commission on May 5, 2003. He retired from the Fifth Circuit on April 2, 2018, prior to taking office as U.S. ambassador to Argentina.

== Community involvement ==
Prado has been a leader in numerous bar associations and law-related organizations. He has been a member of the Texas and San Antonio Bar Associations since 1972, including service as a President, and later Director and Chairman of the Board of Trustees of the San Antonio Bar Foundation. Prado serves on the Texas State Bar Crime Victims Committee, and was appointed by Chief Justice Rehnquist to serve as the Chairman of the Criminal Justice Act Review Committee, from 1991 to 1993.

Prado also has been actively involved in community and charitable affairs as a member in community organizations such as: St. Mark's Catholic Church, the Witte Museum Community Advisory Committee, the Philosophical Society of Texas, the Rotary Club of San Antonio and Leadership San Antonio. Prado has reached out to children in the San Antonio community by conducting events in his courtroom as an introduction to the law.

He has received many honors and awards, including the following: St. Thomas More Award, St. Mary's University School of Law (2000); Outstanding Alumnus, San Antonio College (1989); LULAC State Award for Excellence (1981); Edgewood I.S.D. Hall of Fame (1981); Achievement Award, U.S. Attorney General (1980); Outstanding Young Lawyer of San Antonio (1980); and Outstanding Federal Public Defender, Western District of Texas (1978).

== United States ambassador to Argentina ==
On January 17, 2018, President Donald Trump announced his intent to nominate Prado to be the next United States Ambassador to Argentina. His nomination was sent to the Senate on January 19, 2018. On March 7, 2018, Prado testified before the United States Senate Committee on Foreign Relations.

On March 20, 2018, his nomination was reported out of committee. His nomination was confirmed by voice vote on March 22, 2018.

On May 8, 2018, Prado arrived in Argentina, and presented his credentials to the President of Argentina, Mauricio Macri, allowing him to perform his duties as the 56th U.S. Ambassador to Argentina. He left office on January 20, 2021.

== See also ==
- George W. Bush Supreme Court candidates
- List of Hispanic and Latino American jurists

Legal offices
Preceded by Jamie C. Boyd	United States Attorney for the Western District of Texas; 1981–1984	Succeeded by Helen M. Eversberg
Preceded by Clyde Frederick Shannon Jr.	Judge of the United States District Court for the Western District of Texas; 1984–2003	Succeeded by Xavier Rodriguez
Preceded by Robert Manley Parker	Judge of the United States Court of Appeals for the Fifth Circuit; 2003–2018	Succeeded by Andy Oldham
Diplomatic posts
Preceded by Noah Mamet	United States Ambassador to Argentina; 2018–2021	Succeeded by Marc Stanley
