= Lifeline (FCC program) =

American telecommunications subsidy program

Lifeline is the Federal Communications Commission's program, established in 1985, intended to make communications services more affordable for low-income consumers. Lifeline provides subscribers a discount on monthly telephone service purchased from participating providers in the marketplace. Subscribers can also purchase discounted broadband internet from participating providers. The Lifeline program is funded by telephone fees as part of the Universal Service Fund.

== Overview ==
=== Main program ===
Lifeline provides a discount on monthly service of $9.25 per month for eligible low-income subscribers. Subscribers may receive a Lifeline discount on either a wireline or a wireless service, but may not receive a discount on both services at the same time. Lifeline also supports broadband and broadband-voice bundles. FCC rules prohibit more than one Lifeline service per household. Residents of Native American Indian and Alaska Native tribal communities may qualify for enhanced Lifeline assistance (up to an additional $25.00).

Lifeline is available to eligible low-income subscribers in every state, territory, commonwealth, and on tribal lands. To participate in the program, subscribers must either have an income that is at or below 135% of the federal poverty guidelines, or participate in certain assistance programs.

Companies that have participated in the lifeline program include Assurance Wireless, Safelink Wireless, and Life Wireless.

The Lifeline program led to a rumor that the government was paying for people to get free "Obama phones", though the program was not started under the Obama administration, and the program neither covers the cost of the phone itself, nor is it paid with taxpayer funds.

=== Link up America ===
Link-Up America assisted consumers with the installation costs of phone service. Link-Up program paid up to 50% or $30 of the telephone service installation fees, and provides up to $200 of one year, interest-free loans for any additional installation costs. On January 31, 2012, among other changes to the Lifeline Program, the FCC announced that they would be ending the Link-Up America Program, except on Indian reservations.

Residents of Native American Indian and Alaska Native tribal communities may qualify for expanded Link-Up support (up to an additional $70.00).

=== Lifeline National Eligibility Verifier (NLAD) ===
Starting in June 2018 and fully rolled out by December 2020, the USAC set up the Lifeline National Eligibility Verifier as a centralized database to determine whether subscribers are eligible for the Lifeline program. The database was also used to determine eligibility for the COVID-era Emergency Broadband Benefit program and the successor Affordable Connectivity Program while those programs were active.

The database determines eligibility in all US states, territories, and Washington DC, with the exception of the three opt-out states: California, Texas, and Oregon. These states remain responsible for determining eligibility of their own residents.

== History ==
=== Early history (1984–2011) ===
The FCC established the Lifeline program in 1984 to provide qualified individuals with discounts on phone service. In 1997, the FCC broadened the scope of the program under the 1997 Universal Service Order to make Lifeline more affordable for low-income households by raising the federal support amount. Due to the rise of cell phones, the FCC made more changes in 2005 so that wireless phone service providers could offer free cell phone service using Lifeline benefits.

=== Julius Genachowski (2009–2013) ===
On January 31, 2012, the Federal Communications Commission approved an order changing the Lifeline Program to reduce fraud and abuse. to require Lifeline subscribers to provide income documentation. This change led to savings of over $213 million in 2012. The reform happened amidst criticism of significant waste in the program, such as the fact that there was no database to check if any of the 17 million households received subsidies for more than one phone.

In April 2013 a hearing was held before the Subcommittee on Communications and Technology of the Committee on Energy and Commerce, U.S. House of Representatives, to explore issues relating to whether the program should be eliminated or placed under a budget cap, and if not, whether a freeze should be put in place until the reform measures currently underway are completed.

=== Tom Wheeler (2013–2017) ===
In 2013, the Lifeline program paid out $1.8 billion in subsidies to telephone companies; reduced to $1.5 billion by 2015. The number of subsidy recipients was down to 12 million households by 2015.

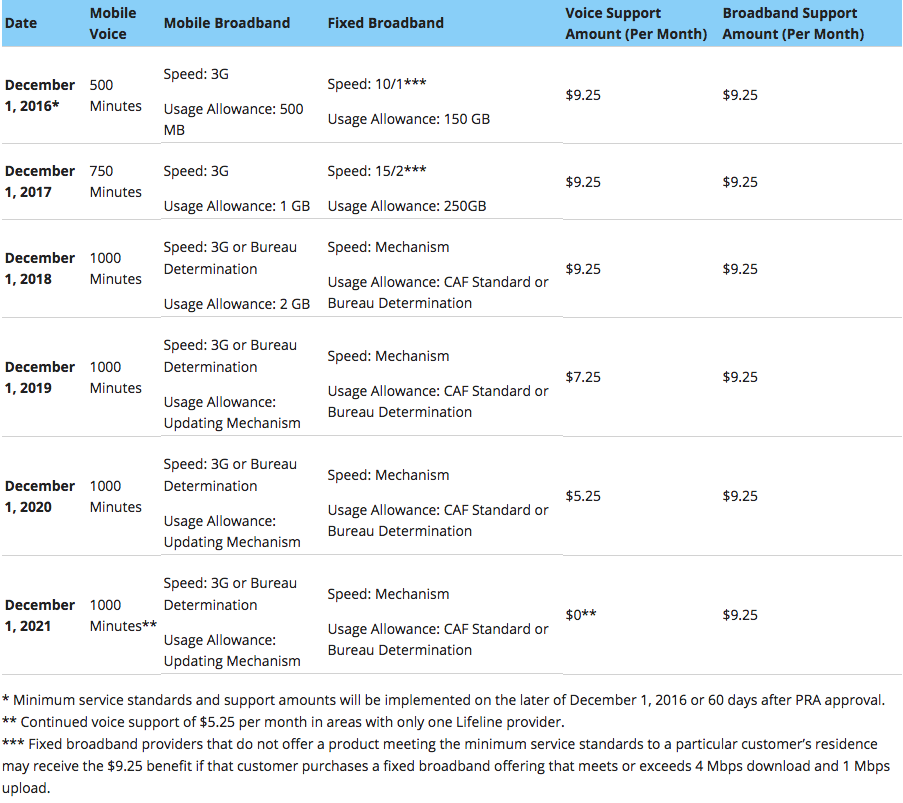
This is the proposed cost and data plan for the Lifeline program reform.

In June, 2015, the FCC announced steps to modernize and reform Lifeline for broadband. Public comments were sought, with a deadline of August 31, 2015.

On March 31, 2016, the Federal Communications Commission set a plan to reform the Lifeline program. The reform attempted to make the Lifeline program more modern and comprehensive to present day society. The 2016 Lifeline Modernization Order included that broadband service would be provided to low income households as an addition to the preexisting Lifeline program benefits. The commission also set service standards in order to ensure the highest value for the Universal Service Fund. The FCC projected that the annual amount of mobile voice minutes available for each individual household per month will increase, while the cost of voice support will simultaneously decrease and will eventually become a completely unsubsidized service. The FCC also appointed a National Eligibility Verifier whose purpose would be to determine the eligibility of the independent subscribers to the program.

On April 1, 2016, the Federal Communications Commission voted to expand the Lifeline telephone subsidy for low-income Americans to include Internet access.

On April 27, 2016, the full text of the ruling was released.

The key points of the decision include:

- Establishes a National Eligibility Verifier to verify eligible Lifeline subscribers. Eligibility will be based on participation in SNAP, Medicaid, SSI, Federal Public Housing Assistance, the Veterans *Pension benefit program, current Tribal qualifying programs, or those who can demonstrate income of less than 135 percent of the federal poverty guidelines.
- Defines minimum service standards for broadband and mobile voice services.
- Defines a five and half year transition plan to migrate from voice-focus to broadband-service-focus.
- Creates a Lifeline Broadband Subscriber designation process to encourage new service providers.
- Requires that Lifeline providers make available hotspot-enabled devices and Wi-Fi enabled devices when providing such devices for use with the Lifeline-supported service.
- Directs the Consumer and Governmental Affairs Bureau (CGB) to develop recommendations to address the non-price barriers to digital inclusion. In addition, CGB's plan should address best practices for increasing the digital skills of those already online and how those best practices can be spread throughout the digital inclusion community.

=== Ajit Pai (2017–2021) ===
In February 2017, incoming FCC commissioner Ajit Pai ordered the FCC to reconsider nine wireless internet providers which had been previously approved to participate in the Lifeline program. Pai pointed to the fact that the final approval of these companies was completed only days before he joined, and argued that their approval was controversial and did not affect 99% of the companies nor any existing customers. In an attempt to combat waste and fraud in the USF, the FCC conducted an investigation into the Lifeline program which revealed "serious weaknesses in federal safeguards, allowing providers to indiscriminately override checks that are supposed to prevent wasteful and fraudulent activities." As a result, Ajit Pai, current FCC commissioner withdrew some Lifeline subsidies "to come up with a better way to vet them for potential waste, fraud and abuse." Pai argued that it is necessary to halt some funds towards programs riddled with fraud because "putting the designations on hold gives the FCC the chance to make sure the process is legally defensible and to avoid potentially stranding customers if the courts ultimately deem the process unlawful". However, critics of the move pointed to the fact that the affected companies were the only ones known to offer broadband, making the reconsideration a de-facto ban on using Lifeline for broadband access. Some even speculated that he may eventually dismantle the entire Lifeline program.

Out of the four USF programs, the Lifeline program is currently the only one without a strict budget cap. Lifeline can go over its current budget as long as the FCC provides a reason as to why they need to spend more money. This allows the FCC to subsidize communication services to people with low income. As stated above, this will most likely change as the FCC is reviewing Pai's proposal on November 16, 2017, to set a budget cap on the Lifeline program.

In early 2018, the FCC Chairman Ajit Pai proposed a plan to scale back the USF's Lifeline program. Pai claimed the proposed cutbacks would encourage business investment in low income communities, reducing the need for the government spending on the program. Pai also referenced the fraud that surrounds the usage of the program as a reason to scale back Lifeline. If passed and put into effect, this cutback would end Lifeline access for 8 million people, which accounts for about 70% of the program's recipients. In the American territory of Puerto Rico, this would translate to about 17% of its population that would lose access. Pai and the proponents of the budget cuts claim that the Lifeline program is being abused by resellers claiming that some recipients listed in the databases are deceased or do not exist. Pai's hope is that this budget cut will stimulate the free market and allow existing broadband networks to expand their infrastructure into the rural areas.

Nine U.S. Senators issued a joint letter opposing the cutbacks, contending that, "The Lifeline Program is essential for millions of Americans who rely on subsidized internet access to find jobs, schedule doctor's appointments, complete their school assignments, interface with the government, and remain connected in a digital economy."

This cut to the Lifeline program prevents other smaller companies known as resellers from "buying network capacity from big telecom providers and then selling it back to low-income consumers at cheaper rates." This is problematic for the majority of Lifeline customers who rely on those cheaper rates.

The Trump administration looks to be opposed to this program as they feels it is wasteful of taxpayer money. Since 2017, there has been a 21% decrease in the number of people being assisted by this program. In 2017 just under 11 million people were being assisted whereas now in 2019, slightly under 9 million people are receiving assistance. It is estimated 2.3 million people are no longer enrolled in this program.

The FCC under Ajit Pai opened an inquiry in 2017 about excluding wireless resellers, eliminating support of standalone broadband service, and capping the budget of Lifeline. Critics said these changes would leave millions of poor Americans without phone service. They also say that although 74% of Lifeline subscribers have access to broadband on their smartphone or computer, it is critical to also provide access to standalone broadband service in their homes due to data caps and the usability differences between smartphones and computers.

In April 2019, the FCC office of Inspector General issued an advisory alert to carriers and beneficiaries in connection to fraudulent enrollment practices. In August 2019, FCC Chairman Pai proposed further administrative changes to root out fraud and abuse of the program. The biggest change in this proposal is to put in additional requirements to ensure that carriers enrolling subscribers can verify that the person is still living. This change will also prohibit carriers from paying commissions to employees or agencies based on the number of customers they enroll. As of August 2019, Pai's latest Lifeline proposal had not been made public, but the FCC said that the lifeline identity verifier would be rolled out in the US by the end of 2019.

== See also ==
- Affordable Connectivity Program
- E-Rate
