= Xavier Rodriguez =

American judge (born 1961)

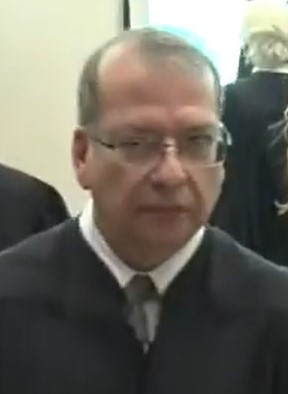
- Rodriguez in 2019

Judge of the United States District Court for the Western District of Texas
- Incumbent
- Assumed office August 1, 2003
- Appointed by: George W. Bush
- Preceded by: Edward C. Prado

Justice of the Supreme Court of Texas
- In office September 7, 2001 – November 6, 2002
- Appointed by: Rick Perry
- Preceded by: Greg Abbott
- Succeeded by: Steven Wayne Smith

Personal details
- Born: Xavier Rodriguez; 1961 (age 64–65) San Antonio, Texas, U.S.
- Party: Republican
- Education: Harvard University (BA); University of Texas at Austin (MPA, JD)

Military service
- Allegiance: United States of America
- Branch/service: United States Army
- Years of service: 1983–1993
- Unit: United States Army Reserve

Xavier Rodriguez (born 1961) is an American attorney and jurist serving as a United States district judge of the United States District Court for the Western District of Texas. Rodriguez was previously a justice of the Texas Supreme Court from 2001 to 2002.

== Early life and education ==
Rodriguez was born in San Antonio, Texas. He received his Bachelor of Arts degree in history from Harvard University, a Master of Public Administration degree from the Lyndon B. Johnson School of Public Affairs at the University of Texas, and a Juris Doctor from the University of Texas Law School.

== Career ==
Rodriguez served in the United States Army Reserve as an officer from 1983 to 1993 after receiving his commission from the ROTC program at Massachusetts Institute of Technology.

Rodriguez is a regular speaker on continuing legal education seminars and has authored numerous articles regarding employment law, discovery and arbitration issues. He is past chair of the State Bar of Texas Labor and Employment Council and chair of the State Bar Paralegal Committee.

Prior to assuming the bench, he was a partner in the international law firm of Fulbright & Jaworski. Rodriguez then served on the Supreme Court of Texas until he was defeated in his re-election run. Rodriguez then returned to private practice briefly before being appointed to the United States District Court for the Western District of Texas in San Antonio by President George W. Bush.

=== Federal judicial service ===
On May 1, 2003, President George W. Bush nominated Rodriguez to the United States District Court for the Western District of Texas to a seat vacated by Judge Edward C. Prado, who was elevated to the United States Court of Appeals for the Fifth Circuit on May 13, 2003. He was confirmed by the United States Senate on July 31, 2003 and received his commission on August 1, 2003. Rodriguez had been considered a candidate for a vacancy on the United States Court of Appeals for the Fifth Circuit, along with District Judge Marina Marmolejo.

== See also ==
- List of Hispanic and Latino American jurists

Legal offices
Preceded by Edward C. Prado	Judge of the United States District Court for the Western District of Texas; 2003–present	Incumbent
