= Fred Shannon =

American judge (born 1942)

Clyde Frederick Shannon Jr.

Judge of the United States District Court for the Western District of Texas
- In office June 18, 1980 – January 1, 1984
- Appointed by: Jimmy Carter
- Preceded by: Dorwin Wallace Suttle
- Succeeded by: Edward C. Prado

Personal details
- Born: Clyde Frederick Shannon Jr. December 17, 1942 (age 83) Marshall, Texas, U.S.
- Education: Loyola University New Orleans (BBA); University of Texas School of Law (LLB)

Clyde Frederick Shannon Jr. (born December 17, 1942) is a former United States district judge of the United States District Court for the Western District of Texas.

== Education and career ==
Born in Marshall, Texas, Shannon received a Bachelor of Business Administration from Loyola University New Orleans in 1965 and a Bachelor of Laws from the University of Texas School of Law in 1968. He was in private practice in San Antonio, Texas from 1968 to 1975. He was a judge of the 131st District Court of Texas from 1975 to 1980.

== Federal judicial service ==
Shannon was nominated by President Jimmy Carter on December 19, 1979, to a seat on the United States District Court for the Western District of Texas vacated by Judge Dorwin Wallace Suttle. He was confirmed by the United States Senate on June 18, 1980, and received his commission the same day. Shannon served until his resignation on January 1, 1984.

== Post judicial service ==
Shannon returned to the private practice of law in San Antonio following his resignation from the federal bench.

== Sources ==
Legal offices
| Preceded by Dorwin Wallace Suttle | Judge of the United States District Court for the Western District of Texas; 1980–1984 | Succeeded by Edward C. Prado |
