= E-Rate =

American telecommunications support program

E-Rate is the commonly used name for the Schools and Libraries Program of the Universal Service Fund, which is administered by the Universal Service Administrative Company (USAC) under the direction of the Federal Communications Commission (FCC). The program provides discounts to assist schools and libraries in the United States to obtain affordable telecommunications and internet access. It is one of four support programs funded through a universal service fee charged to companies that provide interstate and/or international telecommunications services.

== Function ==
The Schools and Libraries Program supports connectivity – the conduit or pipeline for communications using telecommunications services and/or the internet. Funding is requested under four categories of service: telecommunications services, internet access, internal connections, and basic maintenance of internal connections. Discounts for support depend on the level of poverty and the urban/rural status of the population served and range from 20% to 90% of the costs of eligible services. Eligible schools, school districts and libraries may apply individually or as part of a consortium.

Applicants must provide additional resources including end-user equipment (e.g., computers, telephones, etc.), software, professional development, and the other elements that are necessary to utilize the connectivity funded by the Schools and Libraries Program.

=== Impact ===
Yearly requests for E-Rate funding almost triple the FCC's $2.25 billion limit. At the beginning of 2005, over 100,000 schools had participated in the program. In 2003, nearly half of the funding went to schools where more than half of the students receive reduced price lunches.

Broadly, US Department of Education's nationally representative surveys show that between 1994 and 1999, internet access in public schools rose from 35% to 95%, and access in classrooms rose from 3% to 63%.

Some studies have suggested that the E-Rate program has had a positive impact on schools. A 2006 case study performed by the Benton Foundation found that E-Rate funding had a direct impact on classroom internet connectivity in four cities. An evaluation of E-Rate in California by Goolsbee and Guryan showed a 68% increase in classroom connectivity per teacher but could not identify any impact on student achievement. A study concluded in 2005 by a University of Texas student under the supervision of economics professor Mike Ward, using regression analysis, showed the E-Rate program in Texas school districts to have positive effect on factors like test scores, graduation rates, and college admission rates.

== Structure ==
=== Legal authorization ===
The Schools and Libraries portion of the Universal Service Fund, more widely known as E-Rate, was authorized as part of the Telecommunications Act of 1996, section 254. The act called for universal service, meaning that everyone should have access to advanced telecommunications services at reasonable rates regardless of their location. Two measures were included to advance this goal specifically for libraries and schools. Telecommunications providers were ordered to supply their services to schools and libraries at discounted rates determined by the FCC. More generally, the FCC was directed to establish rules "to enhance... access to advanced telecommunications and information services for all public and nonprofit elementary and secondary school classrooms, health care providers, and libraries". The FCC was given the authority to establish and periodically evaluate what services qualified for support under both measures according to four broad criteria. Funding was to be provided by contributions from telecommunications providers through an unspecified but "equitable and nondiscriminatory" mechanism.

The E-Rate program was strongly supported by then vice-president Al Gore as a way to connect classrooms to the internet.

=== Implementation ===
On May 7, 1997, the FCC adopted Order 97-157 as its plan to implement section 254 of the 1996 Telecommunications Act. The FCC determined that "telecommunications services, internet access, and internal connections", including "installation and maintenance", were eligible for discounted rates. Internal connections were defined as "essential element[s] in the transmission of information within the school or library". The level of discount that a school or library received would vary from 20% to 90% depending on the cost of services and level of poverty as measured by the percentage of students eligible for the national school lunch program. The total amount of money to be disbursed was capped at 2.25 billion or 15%.

The FCC designed the application process to promote cost effective and accountable solutions. As a part of their applications, schools and libraries were required to conduct an assessment of their current technology resources and explain how they utilize them for their educational mission. This assessment had to be certified by an outside organization, preferably the state government. Schools and libraries were required to select vendors through a competitive bidding process publicized through a national website. Record-keeping requirements were instituted to facilitate audits.

The FCC decided to fund E-Rate through the same pool of money collected for other Universal Service Fund, or USF, programs. The new language in the Telecommunications Act of 1996 expanded the pool of companies required to contribute. The expanded pool included all companies that provided interstate telecommunications service to the public for a fee. As of 1998, around 3500 companies contributed to the USF. A company's contribution to the USF is based on its interstate and intrastate revenues from sales to end users. Companies submit revenue projections, from which the contribution factor is determined and then assessed. This process takes place on a quarterly basis (How the USF Works). In order to preserve low-cost local phone service, companies are only permitted to increase interstate revenues to recoup their USF contribution costs.

The National Exchange Carrier Association (NECA) managed the existing universal service fund, and in their initial authorizing order the FCC directed the NECA to temporarily administer E-Rate as well. When the NECA was unable to agree on how to restructure its Board of Directors to reduce the influence of incumbent local exchange carriers, it instead proposed creation of a subsidiary, the Universal Service Administrative Company, with a board composed of representatives from telecommunications providers and the USF recipient groups. In Order 97-253 the FCC agreed to this proposal. The FCC also directed NECA to create two unaffiliated corporations to manage the schools and libraries and rural health care programs. However, Senator Ted Stevens and the House Committee on Commerce soon inquired whether this violated the Government Corporation Control Act. The Government Accountability Office concluded that it did, and an amendment was added to s.1768 that required the FCC to restructure USF administration. In response, the two new corporations were terminated and their responsibilities shifted to two new divisions within USAC.

=== Filtering requirements ===
The Children's Internet Protection Act, passed in the year 2000, stipulates that in order to receive E-Rate funding, schools and libraries are required to block or filter internet access to pictures that are: (a) obscene; (b) child pornography; or (c) harmful to minors (for computers that are accessed by minors).

=== Modernization ===
On July 23, 2014, the FCC adopted a broad overhaul of the E-Rate program, named the E-Rate Modernization order. The order focused on expanding subsidies for Wi-Fi to a target of $1 billion a year. The move followed a month after a request for reform by president Barack Obama, who had advocated reform of the program during his presidential candidacy in 2007. The move was embraced by many in the telecommunications industry, including Comcast, Cisco, and PCIA - The Wireless Infrastructure Association. The reform was also lauded by the American Library Association.

In November 2014, FCC chairman Tom Wheeler proposed the first increase in the E-Rate budget, an increase of $1.5 billion. In December 2014, the FCC approved the increase by a vote of 3–2, raising the total budget from $2.4 to $3.9 billion.

In October 2025, the FCC under chairman Brendan Carr voted 2-1 to end funding to provide Wi-Fi hotspots that could be used off premises and on school buses. In June 2026, Carr proposed to scale back or eliminate E-Rate, stating that the program had increased children's screen time.

In June 2026, the FCC released a Notice of Proposed Rulemaking asking if the E-Rate program had fulfilled it's mission and should be limited or sunset. Advocates said the program remained critical, and the Schools, Health & Libraries Broadband coalition and the American Library Association launched the Save Our E-Rate campaign to encourage schools, libraries, and communities to file comments in the proceeding.

== Criticism ==
=== Funding structure ===
In addition to the incorporation scandal, E-Rate faced legal challenges from eleven states and six telecommunications companies. These were consolidated in Texas Office of Public Utility Counsel, et al. v. FCC. The chief state complaint was unrelated to E-Rate, but a company complaint about the method of contribution was relevant. Since the USF fee collection is mandated by the federal government, the CBO and OMB consider the fees collected to be federal revenues and the money disbursed for discounts to be federal outlays. However, only the United States House of Representatives is constitutionally permitted to introduce revenue-generating measures. Also, the power to establish user fees may be delegated to executive agencies, but the power to tax may not. The court found that the FCC's collection of USF fees did not violate the constitution.

Some members of congress objected to the level and method of funding provided by the FCC to E-Rate. They viewed the inclusion of internal connections and $2.25 billion budget as excessive and a drain on resources needed to achieve other aspects of universal service. Two such members, Representative Tauzin and Senator Burns, proposed unsuccessful legislation in the 106th Congress to end E-Rate and replace it by a block grant program administered by the Commerce Department. Several other pieces of legislation have been introduced that keep E-Rate but change the funding mechanism to avoid a direct impact on local phone service.

In 2002, a report on Universal Service Fund from the FCC's Office of Inspector General found that E-Rate had a "lack of resources for effective oversight", "inadequate competitive bidding requirements", and "no suspension or disbarment process" for schools, libraries, or companies with a history of fraud. Random audits conducted by the OIG led to criminal investigations. In response, congress requested a Government Accountability Office report on the health of E-Rate and planned hearings on the matter.

The GAO found serious fault with the unusual organizational structure of E-Rate. USAC was not operating under federal fiscal accountability standards. Also, the GAO decried the lack of performance measures for evaluating the impact of E-Rate funds. The House Committee on Energy and Commerce's Subcommittee on Oversights and Investigations held four hearings into misuse of E-Rate funds. The subcommittee found a multitude of irregularities: purchases were being made with fraudulent documentation and without competitive bidding; inadequate strategic technology plans were accepted and led to unused, wasted resources; and no protections were in place to prevent gold plating ("procurement of technology goods and services far beyond reasonable school district needs and resources") and many other forms of abuse.

=== Fraud and waste ===
Critics point to many cases of fraud and wastefulness in the E-Rate program. Examples include $101 million in equipment which was used for nine schools in Puerto Rico, a $73 million network in Atlanta which never went through a bidding process, and a $21 million settlement from the NEC for fraud and price rigging.

In 2009, a division of AT&T settled $8.2 million in lawsuits alleging violations of the bidding process, as well as using E-Rate to cover ineligible services. In September 2010, the FCC tightened restrictions on gifts given to school personnel by telecommunications companies for the E-Rate program. In November 2010, Hewlett-Packard settled a lawsuit for $16.25 million concerning contractors illegally giving gifts to school officials in exchange for contracts on E-Rate funded equipment. The HP lawsuits were part of a larger investigation of the Texas E-Rate program by the US Department of Justice which included smaller settlements from Houston Independent School District, Dallas Independent School District, and a businessman.

In 2013, an investigation by a Jewish newspaper found that Haredi Jewish schools in New York City received millions in E-Rate funding, despite their practice of rejecting modern technology.

=== Overcharging schools ===
Under the E-Rate program rules, service providers are not allowed to charge schools more than the "Lowest Corresponding Price", meaning that companies cannot charge schools more than they charge other non-residential users for service. However, providers such as AT&T and Verizon sometimes charge 325% or 200% of the price charged to others in the same area.

In order to enforce equal pricing, the Universal Service Administrative Company adopted the "Payment Quality Assurance" auditing program, to ensure the program's rules are followed. Under the auditing program, false statements of the Lowest Corresponding Price were prosecuted under the False Claims Act. However, in July 2014 the United States Court of Appeals for the Fifth Circuit ruled that the False Claims Act could not be used to prosecute fraud in the E-Rate program, because the program was not funded by federal money. The fifth circuit ruled that E-Rate was outside the scope of the False Claims Act, forcing the Universal Service Administrative Company to find other legal justification for the pricing enforcement.
