= Universal service =

Provision of baseline level of services to every resident of a country

Universal service is an economic, legal and business term used mostly in regulated industries, referring to the practice of providing a baseline level of services to every resident of a country. An example of this concept is found in the US Telecommunications Act of 1996, whose goals are:

- to promote the availability of quality services at just, reasonable, and affordable rates
- to increase access to advanced telecommunications services throughout the Nation
- to advance the availability of such services to all consumers, including those in low income, rural, insular, and high cost areas at rates that are reasonably comparable to those charged in urban areas

Universal service was widely adopted in legislation in Europe beginning in the 1980s and 1990s. For instance, under the EU Postal Services Directive (97/67/EC), the Electricity Market Directive (2003/54/EC) and the Telecommunications Directive (2002/22/EC). The language of "universal service" has also been used in proposals by the US Democratic Party for the reform of health care.

When the practice is applied to providing media content, a term must-carry is typically used.

== Origins of universal service ==
The concept of universal service appears to have originated with Rowland Hill and the Uniform Penny Post which he introduced in the United Kingdom in 1837. Though Hill never used the term "universal service", his postal system had the hallmarks of early universal service; postal rates were reduced to uniform rates throughout the nation which were affordable to most Britons, enabled by the postage stamp (first introduced here) and a General Post Office monopoly on mail. Hill's reforms were quickly adopted by postal authorities worldwide, including the United States Post Office Department (now the United States Postal Service) which already held a monopoly through the Private Express Statutes. The service obligations of USPS under current law are commonly referred to as the "universal service obligation" or "USO". Universal service is also a key objective of the Universal Postal Union.

== Interconnection between telephone exchanges (1907-1960s) ==
=== Bell system ===
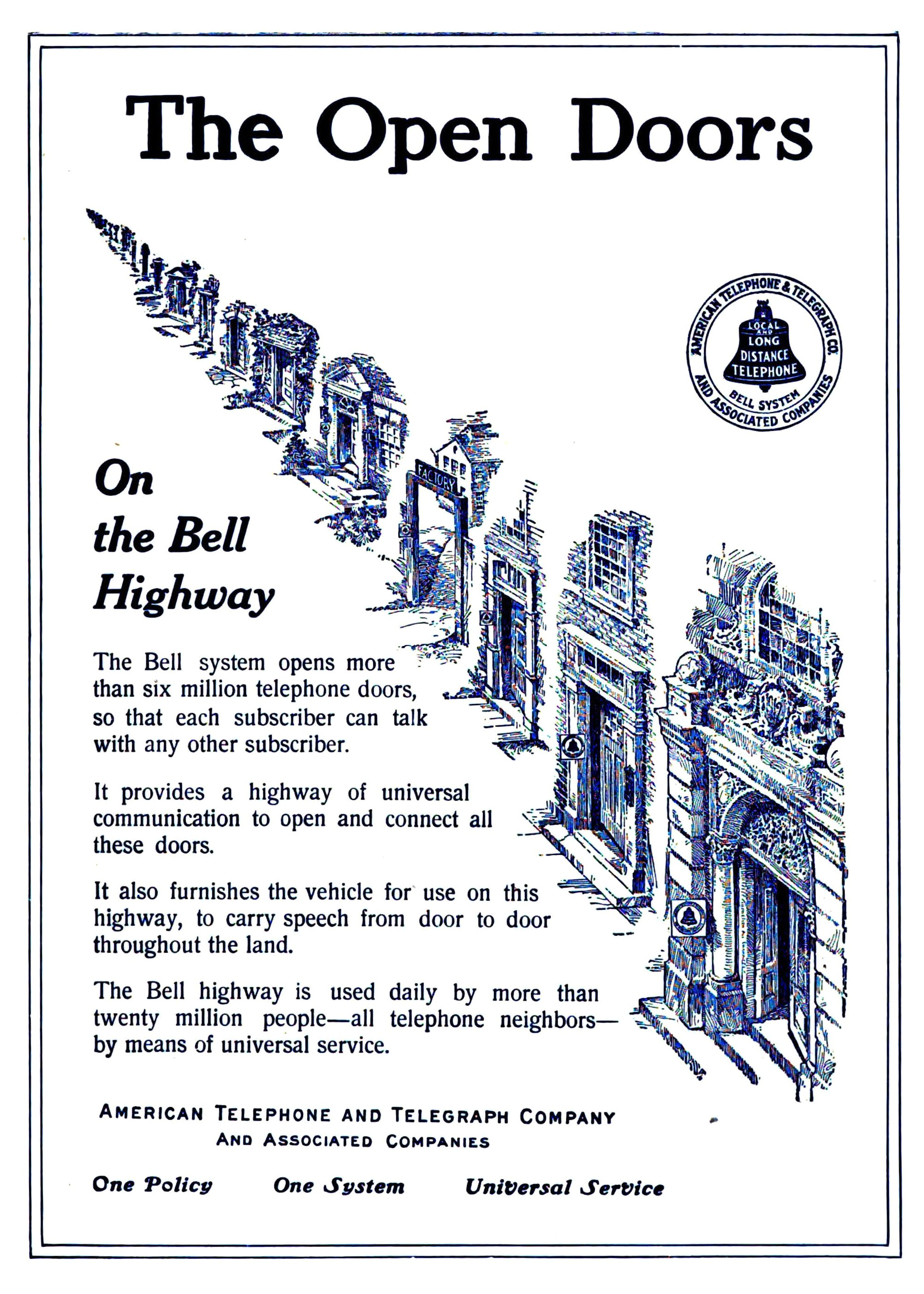
1912 Bell System advertisement promoting its slogan for universal service

In the early history of the telephone up until the early 20th century, telephone service was fragmented. The ability to make a telephone call depended on not just on both parties having telephones, but that their telephone companies used the same standards and that there was a physical interconnect of their networks. The term "universal service" originated with Theodore Newton Vail, president of American Telephone & Telegraph (the original AT&T) and head of the Bell System, in 1907 with the corporate slogan "One Policy, One System, Universal Service". It was intended as a contrast to the "dual service" that had become common since the original Bell telephone patents expired in 1894, where independent telephone companies operated not only in non-Bell System markets, but also as a competitor in Bell markets.

These independent phone companies did not interconnect to the Bell System; though modern commentators suggest Bell refused to do so as an excuse for monopolization, it was argued then that phone systems of that day could not interconnect unless all phone companies used the same technology, as the Bell System did. This required many businesses to maintain phones with both companies, or else risk losing customers who subscribed to the other phone company.

Vail argued that an interconnected phone system (the Bell System), operated by one company (AT&T) and with rates regulated by the government, would be superior to the dual system and would produce great social benefits, much like Hill's postal reforms.

Eventually, Vail prevailed in his views, first through state laws and ultimately through the Kingsbury Commitment of 1913, where AT&T agreed to several measures, including interconnection with non-competing independent phone companies, to avoid antitrust action, thus formalizing the Bell System monopoly. Meanwhile, the Mann-Elkins Act of 1910 made AT&T subject to regulation by the Interstate Commerce Commission.

By 1913, AT&T had favored status from U.S. government, allowing it to operate in a noncompetitive economic environment in exchange for subjection to price and quality service regulation. The government asserted that a monopolistic telephone industry would best serve the goal of creating a "universal" network with compatible technology country-wide for telephone consumers. Regulators emphasized limits on profits, enforcing "reasonable" prices for service, setting levels of depreciation and investment for new technology and equipment, dependability and "universality" of service. "Universal" was originally used by AT&T to mean, "interconnection to other networks, not service to all customers". After years of regulation, the term came to include infrastructural development of telephony and service to everyone at a reasonable price.

=== Willis Graham Act of 1921 ===
The Willis Graham Act of 1921 was called into action in order to resolve pressing issues in the debate about the merits of interconnectivity of telecommunication. The act marks the first piece of legislation in the history of telecommunication to tackle the increasingly difficult challenges of the telecommunication industry in the 20th century. Before the Graham act was passed the commonly expressed opinion was, such as by the Senate Commerce Committee, that telephone service fit the definition of a natural monopoly.

The central practical problem, according to the committee, with the Willis Graham Act was competing telecommunication services serving one individual market. The act was in favor of a monopoly, which aimed to exempt competing telephone companies from the antitrust laws and allow them to unify the service by merging competing telecommunication service providers. The main principle behind the act was that there should be only one system in each community through which all users communicate. The focus was exclusively on local service rather than long-distance service, as no independent long-distance lines were able to compete with AT&T.

=== Communications Act of 1934 ===
Universal service in telecommunications was eventually established as U.S. national policy by the preamble of the Communications Act of 1934, whose preamble declared its purpose as “to make available, so far as possible, to all the people of the United States, a rapid, efficient, Nationwide, and world-wide wire and radio communication service with adequate facilities at reasonable charges”. The chief purpose of this law was to combine the Federal Radio Commission with the ICC's wire communications powers, including regulation of AT&T, into a new Federal Communications Commission with greater powers over both radio and wire communications. The language of the 1934 Communications Act was later re-interpreted to mean a commitment for telephone companies to provide service to all people, but historically this language was aimed at the more limited goal of unifying the United States' fragmentary telephone exchanges into a single universal system.

To comply with the act, AT&T began increasing the price of long-distance service to pay for universal service. The act also established the FCC to oversee all non-governmental broadcasting, interstate communications, as well as international communication which originate or terminate in the United States.

== Providing service to all (1970s-present) ==
Historians of AT&T tend to hold that the modern concept of "Universal Service" has been essentially the same since the firm's foundation. While agreeing that Vail's coining of the term was clearly influential, other scholars have pointed to a significant shift in meaning connected to the Breakup of the Bell System where the meaning of "Universal Service" became focused less on interconnection, and more on providing service to all.

The 1975 report to congress by Eugene V. Rostow on behalf of AT&T was influential in offering a reinterpretation of the 1934 communications Act as defending the benefits of monopoly: not duplicating infrastructure and providing service to all. The Bell System divestiture of 1984 dissolved the monopoly that inspired "Universal Service" and the FCC began to abandon rate regulation.

Universal service, in the sense of aspiring to provide service to all was more explicitly codified by the Telecommunications Act of 1996, even as it permitted expanded competition in the telecommunications field. The Federal Communications Commission is actively exploring universal service reform, and the place of universal service to the broadband communications environment.

== Funding ==
Most countries fund their USO by requiring the incumbent operator to be the designated USO provider or USP. USPs often previously held a legal monopoly protection. The USO is thus funded by rates/tariffs, and also by scale and scope economies. The risk of such an approach, while allowing competitive entry, is that a cross-subsidy exists and thus new entrants can potentially cream-skim (enter in only profitable routes or lines). One response is that some countries have a Universal Service Fund and have all their telecommunications industries pay a part of their net earnings into it. This fund has different names in different countries:

- Chile has the Telecommunications Development Fund (FDT),
- India has the Universal Service Obligation Fund (USOF),
- Pakistan has the Universal Service Fund Company (USF Co.),
- Taiwan has the Universal Service Fund (USF),
- Australia has the Telecommunications Industry Levy (TIL), etc.

== Implementation ==
Fig.1

Fig.2

Though the nomenclature is different the importance of the goal of universal service has been noted by most of the countries and similar methods are being implemented to work towards this end. Each country gives certain service providers Universal Service Provider or Eligible Telecommunications Carrier status. This allows the provider in question to get subsidies from the universal service fund to economically provide the necessary service.

The basic concept of Universal service is the below-cost pricing of service to increase the quantity of service as shown in Fig. 1.

The figure shows a demand curve where the region in red shows the extent of the original service and the increase shown by the green area represents the increase in the service area once the subsidy helps reduce the prices. The conclusion is simple, as the prices reduce from P1 to P2 the quantity of customers increases form Q1 to Q2. Thus satisfying allowing universal service.

The size of the subsidy paid out to the telecommunication service provider in this case is shown in Fig.2.

Since each call in fact costs price P1 and price P2 in the cash flow from the customer, the rest (P1-P2) comes from the Universal Service Fund.

This is a simplistic case and most countries have very complex legislation to guarantee the service and have several subsidy mechanisms to implement universal service. The case shows the idea behind universal service not the universal service mechanism actually used in any country.

== Efficiency ==
As seen from the above, the number of potential customers increases as the number of people who can now afford it increases. However service providers need to be able to actually provide that service through their network. This build-out of network is also subsidized by funds like the High Cost Fund in the United States which is also provided for in the Telecommunications Act of 1996.

Besides services to deprived areas, there is also a "Lifeline" program that subsidizes telephone service to low-income people regardless of location.

== See also ==
- E-rate
- Universal Service Fund
- National broadband plans from around the world
- Broadband universal service

== Sources ==
- Eisenberg, Julie (21 November 2024). "Finding a way forward for Australian News: An examination of local and international regulatory interventions". uts.edu.au. Sydney: University of Technology Sydney.
