= Affordable Connectivity Program =

United States government-sponsored program

- Other short titles: ACP
- Effective: December 31, 2021; 4 years ago

Legislative history
- Signed into law by President Joe Biden on November 15, 2021

The Affordable Connectivity Program (ACP) was a United States government-sponsored program that provided internet access to low-income households. Several companies signed on to participate in the program, including Verizon Communications, Frontier Communications, T-Mobile, Spectrum, Cox, AT&T, Xfinity, Optimum and Comcast. The program was administered by the Federal Communications Commission. The Infrastructure Investment and Jobs Act provided $14.2 billion in funding for $30 subsidies for those with low incomes, and $75 subsidies on tribal lands. The program ended in June 2024.

== History ==
=== 2020 ===
Passed December 2020, the Consolidated Appropriations Act, 2021 directed the FCC to create a new "Emergency Broadband Benefit program" (EBB) with the aim to help Americans with broadband connectivity in response to the effects of the COVID 19 pandemic. $3.2 billion was appropriated for the EBB program.

=== 2021 ===
In 2021, the US Congress passed a $1.2 trillion infrastructure package including $14.2 billion for the Affordable Connectivity Program. The program replaced the Emergency Broadband Benefit program, with $14 billion dedicated to the act. The ACP replaced the EBB on December 31, 2021.

When the act was remarked upon by US President Biden on May 9, 2022, close to 40% of American households qualified for assistance, i.e. households or individuals earned twice the poverty level or less. There are higher limits in Hawaii and Alaska. According to NPR, an estimated 48 million Americans qualified, with the plans to provide at least 100 megabits per second of speed for a maximum of $30. One person in the household must participate in government assistance programs, if the household is above 200% of the Federal Poverty Guidelines.

Twenty internet providers were initially involved, including regional companies such as Hawaiian Telcom and Jackson Energy Authority in Tennessee. The full list included Allo Communications, Altafiber, Altice USA, Astound, AT&T, Breezeline, Comcast, Comporium, Cox Communications, Frontier, IdeaTek, Jackson Energy Authority, Kinetic, MediaCom, MLGC, Spectrum, Verizon, Vermont Telephone Company, Vexus Fiber, and Wow! Internet, Cable, and TV. Aristata Communications joined the program in August 2023.

In 2021, Pew Research Center engaged in a study on the act along with the University of Southern California's Annenberg Research Network on International Communications and the California Emerging Technology Fund, looking at uptake and impact in California.

=== 2022–2023 ===
Separate from the ACP, United States Secretary of Commerce Gina Raimondo and North Carolina Governor Roy Cooper introduced the $45 billion Internet for All initiative in Durham, North Carolina on May 13, 2022. The Broadband Equity, Access, and Deployment Program is to provide each state with $5 million for planning and $100 million for expansion, with states having a greater need receiving more money. The legislature of each state must approve. Funding is also provided by the Infrastructure Investment and Jobs Act.

A Pew study released in February 2023 about the ACP stated that enrollment difficulties presented difficulties for eligible households, with 45 percent of applicants rejected, and others giving up on the applications before they were submitted. Data sharing limitations between agencies was also described a limiting factor for uptake.

On February 27, 2023, the White House announced 16 million households were "saving $500 million per year" due to the program. By July 2023, there were 1,300 internet providers participating in the ACP, although not all provided the discounted device benefit. In July 2023, a study showed about 14% of the United States was enrolled in the program. As of July 31, 2023, 19.8 million households had signed up for the ACP, with 2.8 million of them in rural counties.

By August 2023, there were reports the program would run out of money by 2024. By mid-2024, according to an analysis by The Hill, federal funds available to pay for the program will be depleted, although the federal government "may" continue funding. On August 3, 2023, it was reported that the subsidy would increase to $75/hr month for people in 'high-cost' areas. Congress instructed the NTIA to identify high-cost areas and consult on the matter with the FCC.

=== 2024 ===
As of January 2024 the future of the program remained in doubt, with New Street Research giving chances of the $7 billion extension bill being passed as "significantly below 50%". Provisions are in place for internet service providers to apprise their customers of its status, with the last full month of discounted service currently being April 2024. By that time, more than 23 million households had accessed the ACP. As of late 2024 the program had been subject to funding delays and progress in rollout of broadband had not met the targets of the plan.

== Qualifications ==
According to the FCC website in August 2023, "The benefit provides a discount of up to $30 per month toward internet service for eligible households and up to $75 per month for households on qualifying Tribal lands. Eligible households can also receive a one-time discount of up to $100 to purchase a laptop, desktop computer, or tablet from participating providers if they contribute more than $10 and less than $50 toward the purchase price."

Those receiving various federal benefits were also eligible, including SSI, Pell grants, discounted school meals, Medicaid, WIC assistance, food stamps, VA Survivors Pension, and VA Veterans Pension. Others included Federal Public Housing. The program applied a discount on a monthly basis for participating companies. Other factors for eligibility included being in specific Tribal programs such as Bureau of Indian Affairs General Assistance, Tribal TANF and Food Distribution Program on Indian Reservations.

== See also ==
- Lifeline (FCC program)
- Internet in the United States
