= NTCA - The Rural Broadband Association =

American association of telecommunications companies

- Type: Membership Association
- Predecessor: NTCA

NTCA - The Rural Broadband Association (NTCA) is a membership association with the goal of improving communications services in rural America. With a membership comprising over 850 independent rural American telecommunications companies in 46 states, NTCA provides training and employee benefit packages to its members. It also advocates rural issues to legislatures, including universal service, rural infrastructure, cybersecurity, telemedicine, and consumer protection.

== History ==
In 1949, the Rural Electrification Administration (REA) loan program was established to give long-term, low-interest loans to rural telephone systems. In response, the National Rural Electric Cooperative Association (NRECA) created a committee of representatives from emerging joint electric-telephone cooperative organizations. On June 1, 1954, the eight committee members founded the National Telephone Cooperative Association (NTCA) as a separate national organization that would represent telephone cooperatives. In 1956, NTCA successfully advocated for the maintenance of the REA telephone loan program, which the Eisenhower Administration had attempted to terminate. The organization soon entered into an agreement with NRECA to make the NRECA's insurance and benefit programs available to the employees of NTCA member organizations. By the end of 1956, NTCA’s membership had grown from its original eight members to sixty members, with that figure growing to nearly one hundred members during the 1960s. Throughout the 1960s, NTCA worked to improve the availability of financing to its members by supporting the REA and advocating for the creation of a supplemental bank for rural telephone systems. In 1971, Congress established the Rural Telephone Bank to provide financing to rural telephone companies. In 1970 NTCA allowed locally-owned and controlled commercial telecoms to join the association as non-voting members and in 1971 held its first legislative conference. During the 1970s, NTCA’s membership grew to nearly three hundred.

During the 1990s, NTCA participated in the advocacy efforts that led to the Telecommunications Act of 1996, a rewrite of the communications regulations of the United States that would deregulate and increase competition for the broadcasting and telecommunications markets. NTCA also urged the Federal Communications Commission (FCC) to retain effective competition standards for small cable systems and to support the removal of the telephone and cable television cross-ownership ban. In 1994, NTCA established the Foundation for Rural Service, a nonprofit foundation with the goal of spreading awareness of rural issues. In 2002, NTCA changed its name from the National Telephone Cooperative Association to the National Telecommunications Cooperative Association. In 2013, NTCA and the Organization for the Promotion and Advancement of Small Telecommunications Companies (OPASTCO) merged into one organization called NTCA–The Rural Broadband Association. The new organization included NTCA's 580 members and OPASTCO's 372 members.

In 2017, investment in rural infrastructure became a major priority for the federal government. NTCA advocated for including broadband in any infrastructure program.

2019 marked the 50th anniversary of NTCA’s Rural Broadband PAC, previously known as TECO, and the 25th anniversary of the Foundation for Rural Service.

In 2020, the COVID-19 pandemic spread, causing schools to close and teaching to be conducted online, which placed a spotlight on the importance of broadband. This rise in national attention led policymakers to include broadband funding in two key pieces of legislation passed in 2020: the Coronavirus Aid, Relief, and Economic Security (CARES) Act and the Coronavirus Response and Relief Supplemental Appropriations Act.

In 2021, Congress passed the Infrastructure Investment and Jobs Act, which significantly increased funding for broadband deployment in rural areas. Throughout the legislative and rulemaking processes, NTCA advocated for provisions to ensure that funding is used on networks are future-proof.

In October 2022, the NTCA was the most active group to lobby the FCC, filing at eight separate instances.

== Programs ==
NTCA has several programs to further its goals of supporting rural telecommunications cooperatives, including Smart Rural Community, the Foundation for Rural Service and CyberShare: The Small Broadband Provider ISAC. Smart Rural Community is a program with the goal of increasing the use of broadband and technology in rural America by providing educational programming, providing grants and giving awards. Gig-Capable Provider certification is a program that certifies telecommunications companies that are capable of delivering gigabit broadband speeds to rural communities. The Foundation for Rural Service spreads awareness of rural issues by distributing educational resources, performing research and giving scholarships to rural students. CyberShare is NTCA’s cybersecurity program. Made specifically for small broadband companies, CyberShare provides high-quality indicators and mitigation strategies for cyber-attacks and gives participants access to daily and weekly reports and a secure web platform. Through its subsidiaries, NTCA also provides insurance and benefits programs to its members, runs a political action committee, and sells telecommunications equipment and technical services at group rates.

== See also ==
- Rural Internet in the United States
