= National Exchange Carrier Association =

The National Exchange Carrier Association is a not-for-profit association created in 1984 by the Federal Communications Commission to administer the fees that long distance companies pay to access local telephone networks in the United States. Through the Federal Communications Commission's access charge plan, NECA helps ensure telecommunications and broadband services remain available and affordable in all parts of the country, especially areas served by small rural telecommunications companies.

NECA is mainly composed of rural and small telecommunications companies, and most of them are members of NECA.

== History ==
As part of the Breakup of the Bell System, the FCC announced the Access Charge Plan in December 1982. Under this plan, customers would pay a new flat monthly charge to their local exchange carrier to pay for access to the long-distance telephone network. The National Exchange Carrier Association was set up to collect the fees and distribute the funds.
