= Diana Furchtgott-Roth =

American economist

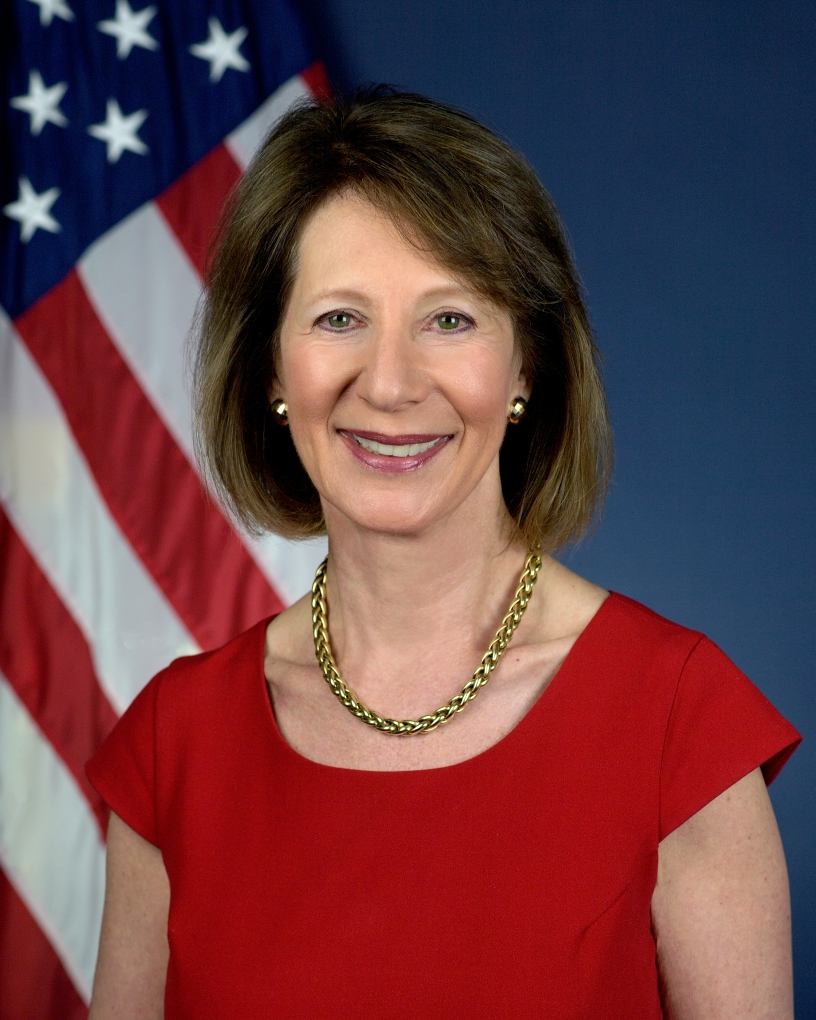
- Furchtgott-Roth in May 2019
- Born: 1958 (age 67–68); England, United Kingdom
- Education: Swarthmore (B.A); Oxford University (M.Phil)
- Occupation: Economist
- Spouse: Harold W. Furchtgott-Roth
- Children: 6
- Parent(s): Gabriel Roth; Ellen Roth

Diana Furchtgott-Roth (born 1958) is an American economist who is adjunct professor of economics at George Washington University and a columnist. She served as Deputy Assistant Secretary for Research and Technology at the United States Department of Transportation during the first Trump administration. She previously served as Acting Assistant Secretary for Economic Policy at the U.S. Department of the Treasury.

Prior to joining the Trump Administration, Furchtgott-Roth served as a senior fellow and director of Economics21 at the Manhattan Institute for Policy Research. On September 28, 2017, President Donald Trump announced his intent to nominate her to become Assistant Secretary of Transportation for Research and Technology. On January 3, 2021, her nomination was returned to the President under Rule XXXI, Paragraph 6 of the United States Senate. Furchtgott-Roth was previously the chief economist of the United States Department of Labor, chief of staff of the President's Council of Economic Advisers, deputy executive director of the United States Domestic Policy Council, and junior staff economist at the Council of Economic Advisers.

A former columnist for MarketWatch and Tax Notes, she has authored seven books.

== Early life and education ==
Diana Roth was born to Ellen and Gabriel Roth in England in 1958. Her family moved to the United States in 1967. Her father was an economist at the World Bank. They lived in Chevy Chase, Maryland. After receiving a B.A. from Swarthmore College in Swarthmore, Pennsylvania, Roth returned to England, where she earned a M.Phil. in economics from the University of Oxford.

== Career ==
Furchtgott-Roth was an economist on the staff of President Ronald Reagan's Council of Economic Advisers in 1986–87. From 1991 to 1993, she was deputy executive director of the White House Domestic Policy Council and associate director of the State Department's Office of Policy Planning under President George H. W. Bush. From 1993 to 2001, she was a resident fellow and assistant to the president at the American Enterprise Institute. In 2001–02, Furchtgott-Roth was the chief of staff of President George W. Bush's Council of Economic Advisers, and from 2003 to 2005, she was chief economist at the United States Department of Labor. From 2005 to 2011, she was a senior fellow at the Hudson Institute. As of 2017, Furchtgott-Roth was an adjunct professor at George Washington University. Her book, Disinherited: How Washington Is Betraying America's Young, coauthored with Jared Meyer, received the 2016 Sir Antony Fisher International Memorial Award from the Atlas Network, a network of free market think tanks.

In 2022, she was named Director of New Center for Energy, Climate, and Environment at The Heritage Foundation. She authored the chapter "Department of Transportation" for the foundation's ninth edition of the Mandate for Leadership, which provides the policy agenda for Project 2025.

=== Views ===
Furchtgott-Roth argues that a regime of lower taxes and less regulation will increase economic growth. She has argued that raising the minimum wage would reduce the number of jobs available to low-skill workers and teens. She has proposed that the U.S. federal government should pay to complement and back up the Global Positioning System because it is used by millions of Americans and is central to the economy.

Furchtgott-Roth has made contributions to The Federalist Society. On questions of interest rate management as a lever of economic growth, she favors the Taylor rule, a stable rate tied to the rate of GDP.

== Personal life ==
Furchtgott-Roth is married to Harold W. Furchtgott-Roth and the couple have six children.

== Bibliography ==
- Women's Figures: All Illustrated Guide to the Economic Progress of Women in America (1999, second edition, 2012)
- The Feminist Dilemma: When Success Is Not Enough (2001)
- Overcoming Barriers to Entrepreneurship in the United States (2008) (editor)
- How Obama's Gender Policies Undermine America (2010)
- Regulating to Disaster: How Green Jobs Policies Are Damaging America's Economy (2012)
- Disinherited: How Washington Is Betraying America's Young (2015) (co-authored with Manhattan Institute fellow Jared Meyer)
- United States Income, Consumption, Wealth, and Inequality (2020) (editor)
