= Eugene Merrill =

Eugene Merrill may refer to:

- Eugene H. Merrill (academic) (born 1934), professor of Old Testament studies at Dallas Theological Seminary
- Eugene H. Merrill (politician) (1908–1973), commissioner of the Federal Communications Commission, 1952–1953
