= Title 47 of the Code of Federal Regulations =

U.S. federal regulations for telecommunications

The Code of Federal Regulations, Telecommunications, containing the U.S. federal regulations for telecommunications can be found under Title 47 of the United States Code of Federal Regulations.

== Commonly referenced parts ==
- Part 15—concerning unlicensed broadcasts and spurious emissions
- Part 18—concerning industrial, scientific, and medical (ISM) radio bands
- Part 68—concerning direct connection of all terminal equipment to the public switched telephone network
- Part 73—Radio Broadcast Services
- Part 74—Remote Broadcast Pickup
- Part 80—Maritime Service
- Part 87—concerning aviation services
- Part 90—concerning licensed wireless communications for businesses and non-federal governments
- Part 95—concerning GMRS, FRS, MURS, and CB radio
- Part 97—concerning amateur radio

== See also ==
- FCC Record
