= Robert M. McDowell =

American lawyer, lobbyist, public official (born 1963)

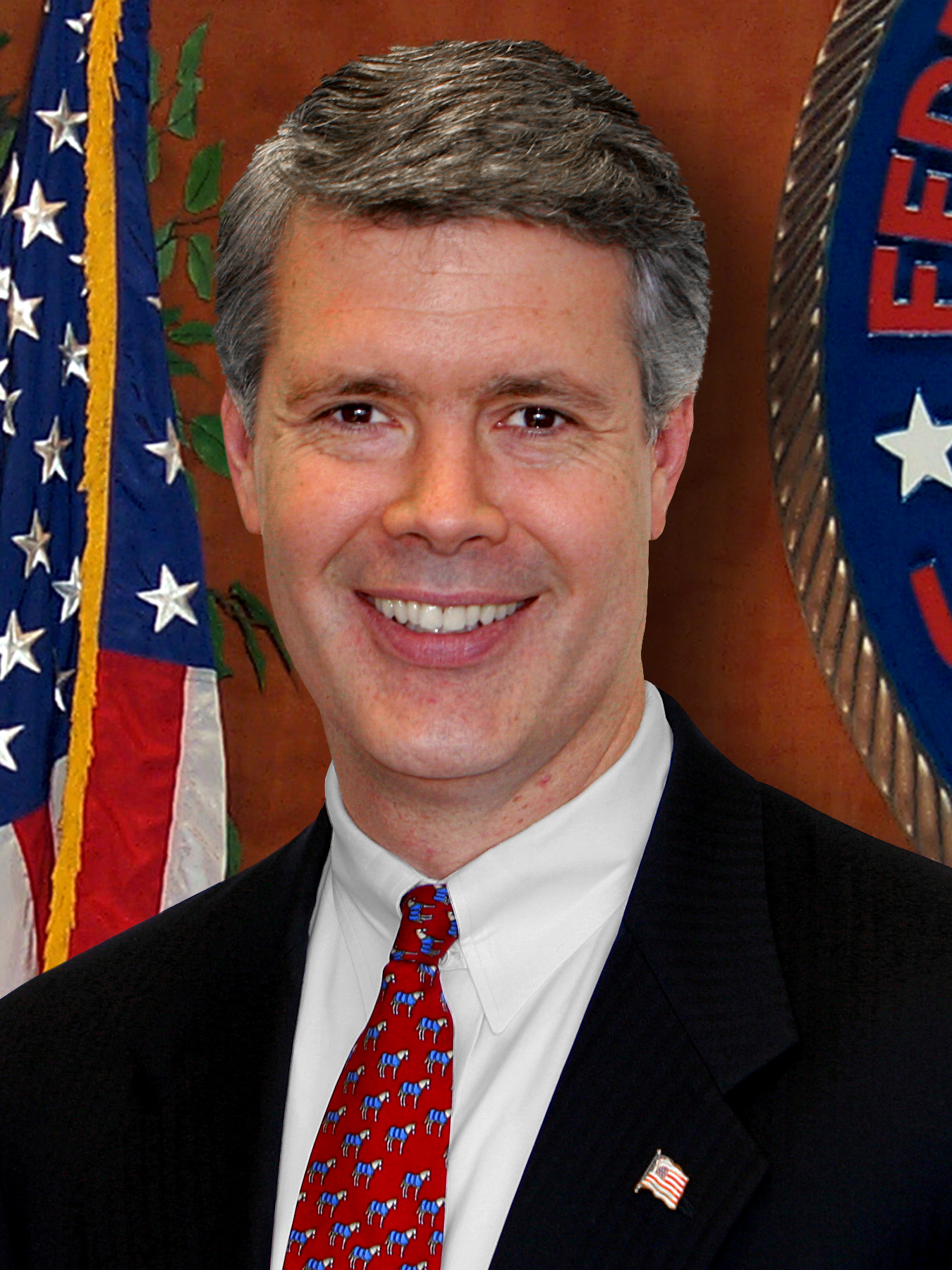

Commissioner of the Federal Communications Commission
- In office May 26, 2006 – May 17, 2013
- Nominated by: George W. Bush; Barack Obama
- Preceded by: Kathleen Q. Abernathy
- Succeeded by: Michael O'Rielly

Personal details
- Born: June 13, 1963 (age 62) Washington, DC
- Party: Republican
- Spouse: Jennifer Griffin
- Relations: Kelly McDowell, brother
- Children: 3
- Parent(s): Martha Louise Shea McDowell; Hobart K. "Bart" McDowell Jr.
- Education: Duke University (BA); William & Mary Law School (JD)
- Occupation: Attorney

Robert Malcolm McDowell (born June 13, 1963) is a lawyer and lobbyist who served as a commissioner of the Federal Communications Commission from June 1, 2006, to May 17, 2013. He is currently a partner in the law firm Cooley LLP.

== Early career ==
McDowell is a former lobbyist for telecommunications companies that compete against the Baby Bells. Immediately before his confirmation to the FCC, he was senior vice president and assistant general counsel of COMPTEL (Competitive Telecommunications Association), an industry trade group of competitive (non-RBOC) telephone companies.

Prior to joining CompTel in February 1999, McDowell served as the executive vice president and general counsel of America's Carriers Telecommunications Association (ACTA), which merged with CompTel at that time.

McDowell was graduated cum laude from Duke University in 1985. After serving as chief legislative aide to Virginia Delegate Robert T. Andrews (R-McLean), he attended the Marshall-Wythe School of Law at the College of William and Mary. Upon his graduation from law school in 1990, McDowell joined the Washington, D.C., office of the national law firm of Arter & Hadden where he focused on communications law.

He was appointed by Virginia Governor George Allen to the Governor's advisory board for a Safe and Drug-Free Virginia, and to the Virginia Board for Contractors where he served for eight years. A veteran of several presidential campaigns, his work during the 1992 presidential campaign is cited in the Almanac of American Politics, 1994. In 2000, he served as a member of the Bush-Cheney Florida recount team. McDowell was a candidate for the Virginia General Assembly, running in 2003 to represent the 35th District in the House of Delegates; he lost to Steve Shannon.

== FCC commissioner ==
McDowell was first appointed to a seat on the Federal Communications Commission by U.S. President George W. Bush and unanimously confirmed by the Senate in 2006. When he was reappointed to the Commission on June 2, 2009, McDowell became the first Republican to be appointed to an independent agency by President Barack Obama. The U.S. Senate confirmed him unanimously on June 25, 2009. McDowell's second term was set to end in June 2014, but he announced on March 20, 2013, his plans to step down early.

McDowell was widely perceived to be a front-runner for chairman of the FCC had Mitt Romney won the 2012 presidential election. On May 17, 2013, McDowell stepped down from the commission to join the Hudson Institute's Center for Economics of the Internet as a visiting fellow.

=== Net neutrality ===
McDowell has been an outspoken critic of net neutrality rules. McDowell, along with Meredith Attwell Baker, dissented from the FCC Open Internet Order 2010. In the D.C. Circuit's 2014 decision in Verizon Communications Inc. v. FCC, the majority on the court panel vacated part of the FCC Open Internet Order 2010, holding that, because the FCC had previously classified broadband providers under Title I of the Communications Act of 1934, the FCC could not regulate broadband providers as common carriers. In a Wall Street Journal op-ed the following day, McDowell called upon the FCC to abandon efforts to adopt net neutrality and contended that the adoption of net neutrality by the FCC would "trigger global regulation of the Internet by the International Telecommunication Union."

McDowell also opposed classifying Internet services as telecommunications services under Title II of the Communications Act of 1934; in congressional testimony, op-eds, and articles, McDowell argued that adopting net neutrality regulations would be an "FCC power grab" and could "morph into a regulatory regime for the entire Internet ecosystem, affecting far more than ISPs."

=== Other issues ===
He opposed proposals to make Digital Object Architecture "the singular and mandatory addressing system for the Internet of Things," writing that this would be "authoritarian internet power grab."

In 2007, McDowell led an effort with then-FCC Commissioner Jonathan Adelstein to adopt a proposal first made in 1984 by the National Association of Black Owned Broadcasters (NABOB) to ban the use of racially discriminatory so-called "no urban, no Hispanic dictates" in broadcast advertising. This anti-discrimination rule became the first new federal civil rights rule adopted in a generation.

On the FCC, McDowell worked to reform the Universal Service Fund, and argued for limiting the Fund's size. He has continued to call for reform of the universal service "taxing" mechanism.

McDowell has been a long-standing critic of the Fairness Doctrine and has repeatedly called for the FCC to repeal the remnants of the Fairness Doctrine from its books. In August 2011 the FCC's Media Bureau issued an order removing all references to the Fairness Doctrine from the Code of Federal Regulations.

On the FCC, McDowell supported unlicensed uses of vacant TV broadcast channels known as "white spaces" and supported rule, adopted in November 2008 rules to open up white spaces for unlicensed use stating, that the rule change would increase innovation and competition.

McDowell dissented in part to the commission's July 2007 rules governing the 700 MHz spectrum auction, arguing that the open access requirement and other rules were overly proscriptive would discourage some bidders and ultimately decrease the proceeds from the auction.

McDowell advocated for consideration of restructuring the FCC's structure and changing its operations.

McDowell proposed changes and deregulation in a May 2011 speech at TIA, and in congressional testimony in July 2011. McDowell made a number of calls for a fundamental rewrite of federal communications laws calling them "outdated.

McDowell recused himself from a vote on an $86 billion merger between AT&T and BellSouth citing his 2006 ethics agreement with the Senate Commerce Committee. AT&T then allegedly campaigned against McDowell's renomination to the Commission in 2009. Endorsed by Senate Republican Leader, Mitch McConnell, AT&T's efforts to block McDowell's renomination were unsuccessful, as McDowell was reconfirmed June 2009.

McDowell sought to raise awareness about the digital television transition and wrote op-eds on the topic. He believed the FCC was insufficiently prepared for the transition. The DTV transition deadline was later extended by Congress to June 12, 2009.

In early 2009, McDowell initiated an effort with then-Acting FCC Chairman Michael Copps to resurrect long-pending proceedings to provide spectrum for low-power medical wireless medical technologies called Medical Body Area Networks (mBANs).

== Career after FCC ==
In November 2013, McDowell was appointed to the Panel on the Future of Global Internet Cooperation and Governance Mechanisms. The Panel released its report containing ideas regarding the future of Internet governance. McDowell issued a separate statement expressing his concern that the report did not go far enough to propose presumption against intergovernmental encroachment on internet governance.

McDowell joined the Hudson Institute as a visiting fellow in 2013.

In 2014, he became a partner at Wiley Rein LLP. He left in 2016 to join Cooley LLP.

== Personal life ==
He is the son of the Hobart K. McDowell Jr., a former senior editor of National Geographic magazine, and the Martha Louise Shea McDowell, a former journalist and public relations executive. He resides on the farm where he grew up near Vienna, Virginia with his wife, the former Jennifer Griffin, and their three children.

McDowell is a former chairman of the Board of the McLean Project for the Arts and a member of the board of Potomac School in McLean, Virginia.
