= Joseph R. Fogarty =

Commissioner of the Federal Communications Commission
- In office September 17, 1976 – June 30, 1983
- President: Gerald Ford; Jimmy Carter; Ronald Reagan
- Preceded by: Charlotte Thompson Reid
- Succeeded by: Seat abolished

Personal details
- Born: January 12, 1931 (age 94); Newport, Rhode Island
- Political party: Democratic

Joseph R. Fogarty (born January 12, 1931) is an American attorney who served as a Commissioner of the Federal Communications Commission from 1976 to 1983.
