= Abbott M. Washburn =

Commissioner of the Federal Communications Commission

Commissioner of the Federal Communications Commission
- In office July 10, 1974 – October 1, 1982
- President: Richard Nixon; Gerald Ford; Jimmy Carter; Ronald Reagan
- Preceded by: H. Rex Lee
- Succeeded by: Stephen A. Sharp

Personal details
- Born: March 1, 1915 Duluth, Minnesota
- Died: December 11, 2003 (aged 88) Washington, D.C.
- Party: Republican

Abbott M. Washburn (March 1, 1915 – December 11, 2003) was an American administrator who served as a Commissioner of the Federal Communications Commission from 1974 to 1982.

He died of a stroke on December 11, 2003, in Washington, D.C. at age 88.
