= Glen O. Robinson =

American attorney and FCC commissioner

Commissioner of the Federal Communications Commission
- In office July 10, 1974 – August 30, 1976
- President: Richard Nixon; Gerald Ford
- Preceded by: Nicholas Johnson
- Succeeded by: Margita White

Personal details
- Born: June 6, 1936 (age 89) Salt Lake City, Utah
- Party: Democratic

Glen O. Robinson (born June 6, 1936) is an American attorney who served as a Commissioner of the Federal Communications Commission from 1974 to 1976. He is Professor Emeritus at the University of Virginia School of Law where he taught from 1976-2008.

Robinson was born in Salt Lake City, Utah, on June 6, 1936. He went to university first at Utah State and then Harvard, from which he received his B.A. magna cum laude in 1958. He obtained his law degree, with honors, from Stanford in 1961 and practiced law in Washington, D.C. until 1967, interrupted by two years in the U.S. Army. Robinson joined the faculty of the University of Minnesota Law School, and taught there until his appointment to the FCC in 1974.

At the conclusion of his two-year term at the FCC, he went to the University of Virginia, where he was a member of the Center for Advanced Studies. He taught at the law school until retirement in 2008.
