= Federal Communications Commission =

U.S. government agency

- Official seal

- Logo

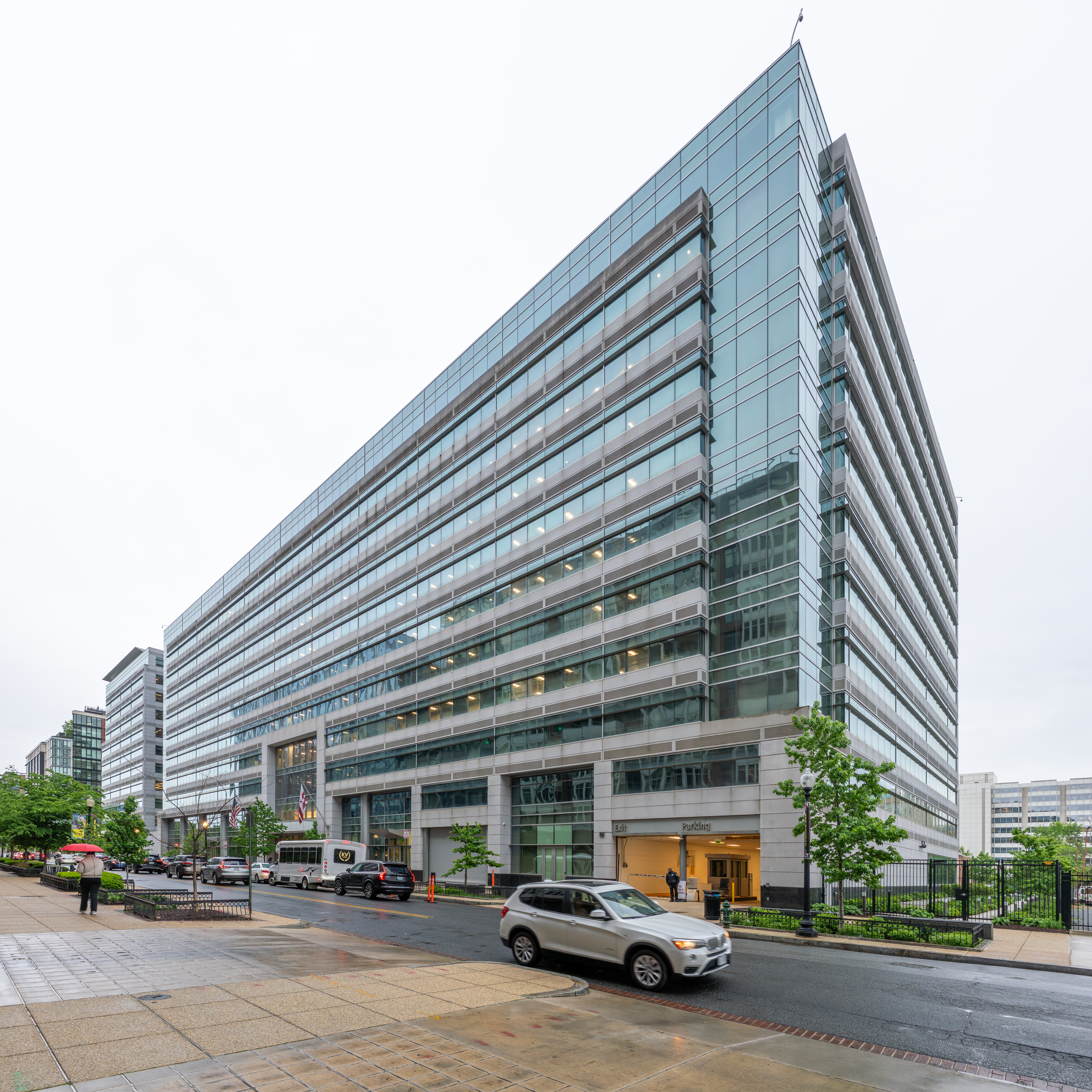
- Headquarters in Washington, D.C.

Agency overview
- Formed: June 19, 1934; 92 years ago
- Preceding agency: Federal Radio Commission
- Jurisdiction: Federal government of the United States
- Headquarters: 45 L Street NE, Washington, D.C., U.S.; 38°54′12″N 77°0′26″W
- Employees: 1,482 (2020)
- Annual budget: $388 million (FY 2022, requested)
- Agency executives: Brendan Carr, Chairman; Anna M. Gomez, Commissioner; Olivia Trusty, Commissioner
- Website: fcc.gov

The Federal Communications Commission (FCC) is an independent agency of the United States federal government that regulates communications by radio, television, wire, internet, Wi-Fi, satellite, and cable across the United States. The FCC maintains jurisdiction over the areas of broadband access, fair competition, radio frequency use, media responsibility, public safety, and homeland security.

The FCC was established pursuant to the Communications Act of 1934 to replace the radio regulation functions of the previous Federal Radio Commission. The FCC took over wire communication regulation from the Interstate Commerce Commission. The FCC's mandated jurisdiction covers the 50 states, the District of Columbia, and the territories of the United States. The FCC also provides varied degrees of cooperation, oversight, and leadership for similar communications bodies in other countries in North America. The FCC is funded entirely by regulatory fees. It has an estimated fiscal-2022 budget of $388 million. It employed 1,433 federal personnel as of 2022.

== Mission and agency objectives ==
As specified in Section 1 of the Communications Act of 1934 and amended by the Telecommunications Act of 1996 (amendment to 47 U.S.C. §151), the mandate of the FCC is, "to make available so far as possible, to all the people of the United States, without discrimination on the basis of race, color, religion, national origin, or sex, rapid, efficient, nationwide, and world-wide wire and radio communication services with adequate facilities at reasonable charges".

Furthermore, the act provides that the FCC was created, "for the purpose of the national defense", and, "for the purpose of promoting safety of life and property through the use of wire and radio communications".

== Organization and procedures ==
=== Commissioners ===
The FCC is directed by five commissioners appointed by the president of the United States and confirmed by the United States Senate for five-year terms, except when filling an unexpired term. The U.S. president designates one of the commissioners to serve as chairman. No more than three commissioners may be members of the same political party. None of them may have a financial interest in any FCC-related business.

After their terms expire, commissioners may continue serving until the appointment of their replacements. However, they may not serve beyond the end of the next session of Congress following term expiration. In practice, this means that commissioners may serve up to 1 1/2 years beyond the official term expiration listed above if no replacement is appointed. This would end on the date that Congress adjourns its annual session, generally no later than noon on January 3.

=== Bureaus ===
The FCC is organized into seven bureaus, each headed by a "chief" that is appointed by the chair of the commission. Bureaus process applications for licenses and other filings, analyze complaints, conduct investigations, develop and implement regulations, and participate in hearings.

- The Consumer & Governmental Affairs Bureau (CGB) develops and implements the FCC's consumer policies, including disability access. CGB serves as the public face of the FCC through outreach and education, as well as through its Consumer Center, which is responsible for responding to consumer inquiries and complaints. CGB also maintains collaborative partnerships with state, local, and tribal governments in such areas as emergency preparedness and implementation of new technologies.
- The Enforcement Bureau (EB) is responsible for enforcement of provisions of the Communications Act 1934, FCC rules, FCC orders, and terms and conditions of station authorizations. Major areas of enforcement that are handled by the Enforcement Bureau are consumer protection, local competition, public safety, and homeland security.
- The Media Bureau (MB) develops, recommends and administers the policy and licensing programs relating to electronic media, including cable television, broadcast television, and radio in the United States and its territories. The Media Bureau also handles post-licensing matters regarding direct broadcast satellite service.
- The Space Bureau (SB) leads policy and licensing matters related to satellite and space-based communications and activities. It will also serve as the commission's liaison to other agencies engaged in space policy. It was created in April 2023 after the former International Bureau (IB) and its functions were divided between the Space Bureau and a new Office of International Affairs.
- The Wireless Telecommunications Bureau regulates domestic wireless telecommunications programs and policies, including licensing. The bureau also implements competitive bidding for spectrum auctions and regulates wireless communications services including mobile phones, public safety, and other commercial and private radio services.
- The Wireline Competition Bureau (WCB) develops policy concerning wire line telecommunications. The Wireline Competition Bureau's main objective is to promote growth and economic investments in wireline technology infrastructure, development, markets, and services.
- The Public Safety and Homeland Security Bureau was launched in 2006 with a focus on critical communications infrastructure.

=== Offices ===
The FCC has twelve staff offices. The FCC's offices provide support services to the bureaus.

- The Office of Administrative Law Judges (OALJ) is responsible for conducting hearings ordered by the commission. The hearing function includes acting on interlocutory requests filed in the proceedings such as petitions to intervene, petitions to enlarge issues, and contested discovery requests. An administrative law judge, appointed under the Administrative Procedure Act, presides at the hearing during which documents and sworn testimony are received in evidence, and witnesses are cross-examined. At the conclusion of the evidentiary phase of a proceeding, the presiding administrative law judge writes and issues an initial decision that may be appealed to the commission.
- The Office of Communications Business Opportunities (OCBO) promotes telecommunications business opportunities for small, minority-owned, and women-owned businesses. OCBO works with entrepreneurs, industry, public interest organizations, individuals, and others to provide information about FCC policies, increase ownership and employment opportunities, foster a diversity of voices and viewpoints over the airwaves, and encourage participation in FCC proceedings.
- The Office of Economics and Analytics (OEA) is responsible for expanding and deepening the use of economic analysis into Commission policy making, for enhancing the development and use of auctions, and for implementing consistent and effective agency wide-data practices and policies. It was created in 2018 by merging staff from the now defunct Office of Strategic Planning & Policy Analysis with economists dispersed throughout various other offices.
- The Office of Engineering and Technology (OET) advises the commission concerning engineering matters.
  - Its chief role is to manage the electromagnetic spectrum, specifically frequency allocation and spectrum usage. OET conducts technical studies of advanced phases of terrestrial and space communications and administers FCC rules regarding radio devices, experimental radio services, and industrial, scientific, and medical equipment.
  - OET organizes the Technical Advisory Council, a committee of FCC advisors from major telecommunications and media corporations.
  - OET operates the Equipment Authorization Branch, which has the task of overseeing equipment authorization for all devices using the electromagnetic energy from 9 kHz to 300 GHz. OET maintains an electronic database of all Certified equipment that can be easily accessed by the public.
- The Office of General Counsel serves as the chief legal adviser to the commission. The general counsel also represents the commission in litigation in United States federal courts, recommends decisions in adjudicatory matters before the commission, assists the commission in its decision-making capacity and performs a variety of legal functions regarding internal and other administrative matters.
- The Office of the Inspector General (OIG) recommends policies to prevent fraud in agency operations. The inspector general recommends corrective action where appropriate, referring criminal matters to the United States Department of Justice for potential prosecution.
- The Office of International Affairs (OIA) is responsible for the commission's engagement in foreign and international regulatory authorities, including multilateral and regional organizations. OIA will also facilitate through rulemaking and licensing the commission's development of policies regarding international telecommunications facilities and services as well as submarine cables, and advise the commission on foreign ownership issues.
- The Office of Legislative Affairs (OLA) is the FCC's liaison to the United States Congress, providing lawmakers with information about FCC regulations. OLA also prepares FCC witnesses for congressional hearings, and helps create FCC responses to legislative proposals and congressional inquiries. In addition, OLA is a liaison to other federal agencies, as well as state and local governments.
- The Office of the Managing Director (OMD) is responsible for the administration and management of the FCC, including the agency's budget, personnel, security, contracts, and publications.
- The Office of Media Relations (OMR) is responsible for the dissemination of commission announcements, orders, proceedings, and other information per media requests. OMR manages the FCC Daily Digest, website, and Audio Visual Center.
- The Office of the Secretary (OSEC) oversees the receipt and distribution of documents filed by the public through electronic and paper filing systems and the FCC Library collection. In addition, OSEC publishes legal notices of commission decisions in the Federal Register and the FCC Record.
- The Office of Workplace Diversity (OWD) develops policy to provide a full and fair opportunity for all employees, regardless of non-merit factors such as race, religion, gender, color, age, disability, sexual orientation or national origin, to carry out their duties in the workplace free from unlawful discriminatory treatment, including sexual harassment and retaliation for engaging in legally protected activities.

=== Headquarters ===
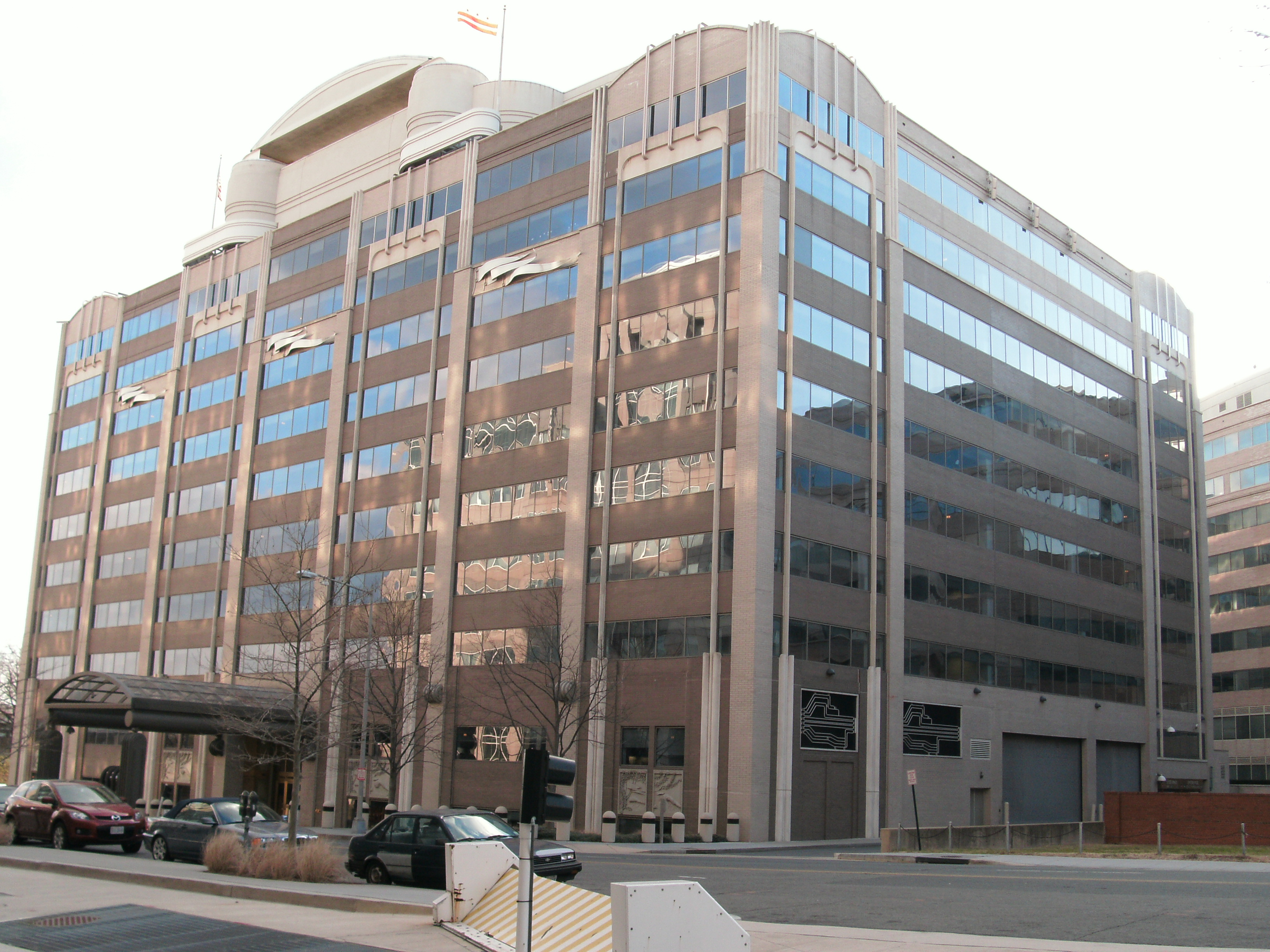
Former Federal Communications Commission Office in Washington, D.C.

The FCC leases space in the Sentinel Square III building in northeast Washington, D.C.

Prior to moving to its new headquarters in October 2020, the FCC leased space in the Portals building in southwest Washington, D.C. Construction of the Portals building was scheduled to begin on March 1, 1996. In January 1996, the General Services Administration signed a lease with the building's owners, agreeing to let the FCC lease 450,000 sq ft (42,000 m^{2}) of space in Portals for 20 years, at a cost of $17.3 million per year in 1996 dollars. Prior to the Portals, the FCC had space in six buildings at and around 19th Street NW and M Street NW. The FCC first solicited bids for a new headquarters complex in 1989. In 1991 the GSA selected the Portals site. The FCC had wanted to move into a more expensive area along Pennsylvania Avenue.

== History ==
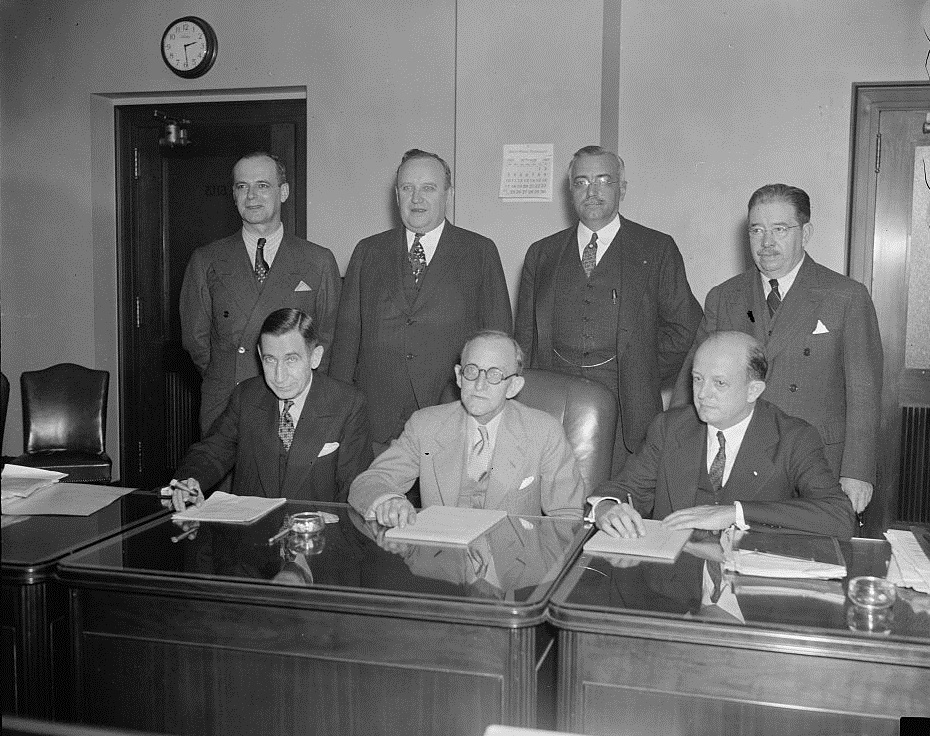
Federal Communications Commission seen in Washington, D.C., in 1937. Seated (l-r) Eugene Octave Sykes, Frank R. McNinch, Chairman Paul Atlee Walker, Standing (l-r) T.A.M. Craven, Thad H. Brown, Norman S. Case, and George Henry Payne.

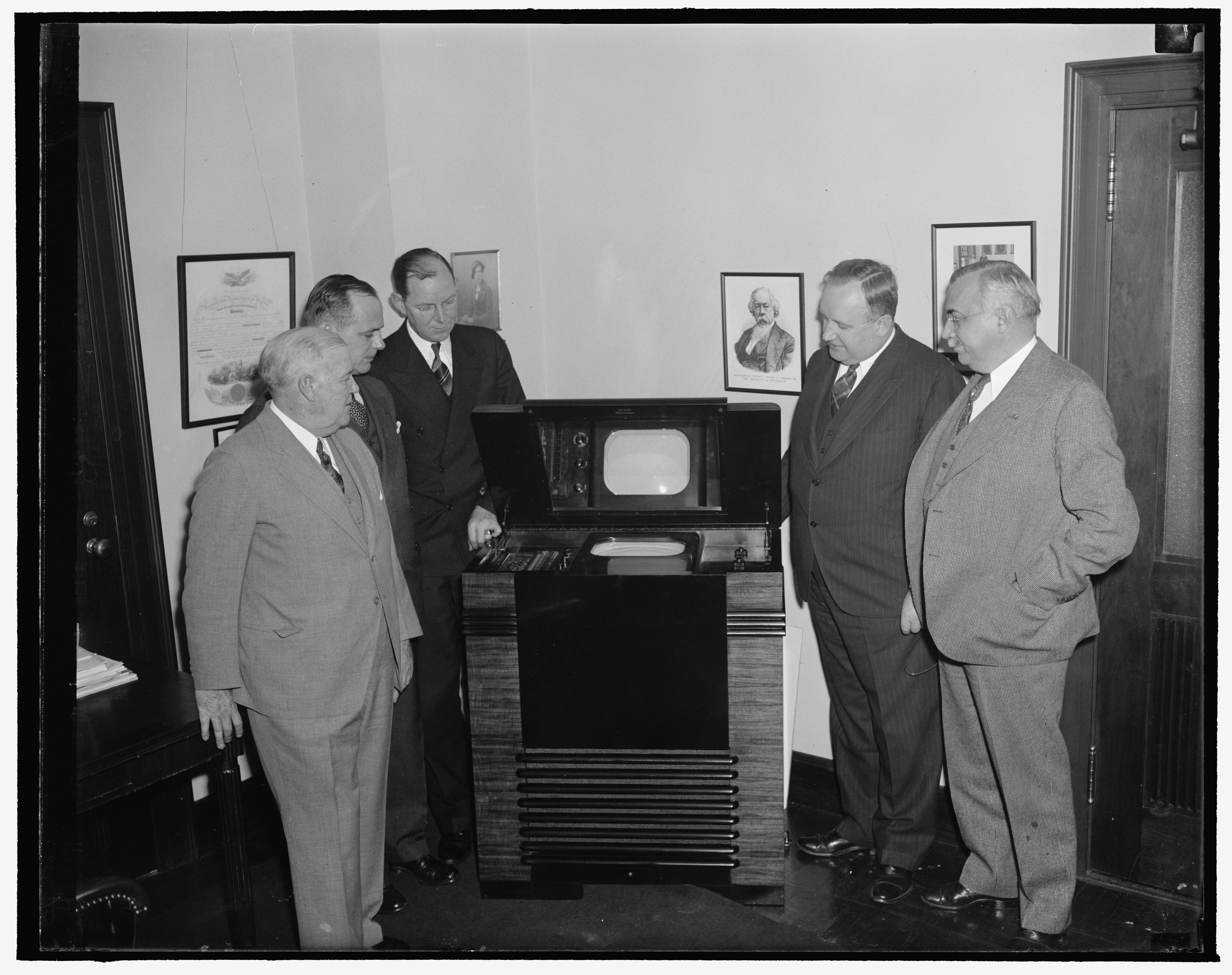
FCC commissioners inspect the latest in television, December 1, 1939.

=== Communications Act of 1934 ===
On February 26, 1934, President Franklin Roosevelt recommended the creation of the Federal Communications Commission. In 1934, Congress passed the Communications Act, which abolished the Federal Radio Commission and transferred jurisdiction over radio licensing to a new Federal Communications Commission, including in it also the telecommunications jurisdiction previously handled by the Interstate Commerce Commission.

Title II of the Communications Act focused on telecommunications using many concepts borrowed from railroad legislation and Title III contained provisions very similar to the Radio Act of 1927.

The initial organization of the FCC was effected July 17, 1934, in three divisions, Broadcasting, Telegraph, and Telephone. Each division was led by two of the seven commissioners, with the FCC chairman being a member of each division. The organizing meeting directed the divisions to meet on July 18, July 19, and July 20, respectively.

=== Report on Chain Broadcasting ===
In 1941, the Federal Communications Commission issued the "Report on Chain Broadcasting" which was led by new FCC chairman James Lawrence Fly (and Telford Taylor as general counsel). The major point in the report was the breakup of the National Broadcasting Company (NBC), which ultimately led to the creation of the American Broadcasting Company (ABC), but there were two other important points. One was network option time, the culprit here being the Columbia Broadcasting System (CBS). The report limited the amount of time during the day and at what times the networks may broadcast. Previously a network could demand any time it wanted from a Network affiliate. The second concerned artist bureaus. The networks served as both agents and employers of artists, which was a conflict of interest the report rectified.

=== Freeze of 1948 ===
Old FCC seal, used prior to 2020

In assigning television stations to various cities after World War II, the FCC found that it placed many stations too close to each other, resulting in interference. At the same time, after eliminating channel 1, it became clear that the designated remaining VHF channels, 2 through 13, were inadequate for nationwide television service. As a result, the FCC stopped giving out construction permits for new licenses in October 1948, under the direction of Chairman Rosel H. Hyde. Most expected this "Freeze" to last six months, but as the allocation of channels to the emerging UHF technology and the eagerly awaited possibilities of color television were debated, the FCC's re-allocation map of stations did not come until April 1952, with July 1, 1952, as the official beginning of licensing new stations.

Other FCC actions hurt the fledgling DuMont and ABC networks. American Telephone and Telegraph (AT&T) forced television coaxial cable users to rent additional radio long lines, discriminating against DuMont, which had no radio network operation. DuMont and ABC protested AT&T's television policies to the FCC, which regulated AT&T's long-line charges, but the commission took no action. The result was that financially marginal DuMont was spending as much in long-line charge as CBS or NBC while using only about 10 to 15 percent of the time and mileage of either larger network.

The FCC's Sixth Report and Order ended the Freeze in 1952. It took five years for the US to grow from 108 stations to more than 550. New stations came online slowly, only five by the end of November 1952. The Sixth Report and Order required some existing television stations to change channels, but only a few existing VHF stations were required to move to UHF, and a handful of VHF channels were deleted altogether in smaller media markets like Peoria, Fresno, Bakersfield and Fort Wayne, Indiana to create markets which were UHF "islands". The report also set aside a number of channels for the newly emerging field of educational television, which hindered struggling ABC and DuMont's quest for affiliates in the more desirable markets where VHF channels were reserved for non-commercial use.

The Sixth Report and Order also provided for the "intermixture" of VHF and UHF channels in most markets; UHF transmitters in the 1950s were not yet powerful enough, nor receivers sensitive enough (if they included UHF tuners at all; they were not formally required until the 1960s All-Channel Receiver Act), to make UHF viable against entrenched VHF stations. In markets where there were no VHF stations and UHF was the only TV service available, UHF survived. In other markets, which were too small to financially support a television station, too close to VHF outlets in nearby cities, or where UHF was forced to compete with more than one well-established VHF station, UHF had little chance for success.

Denver had been the largest U.S. city without a TV station by 1952. Senator Edwin Johnson (D-Colorado), chair of the Senate's Interstate and Foreign Commerce Committee, had made it his personal mission to make Denver the first post-Freeze station. The senator had pressured the FCC, and proved ultimately successful as the first new station (a VHF station) came on-line a remarkable ten days after the commission formally announced the first post-Freeze construction permits. KFEL (now KWGN-TV)'s first regular telecast was on July 21, 1952.

=== Telecommunications Act of 1996 ===
In 1996, Congress enacted the Telecommunications Act of 1996, in the wake of the breakup of AT&T resulting from the U.S. Department of Justice's antitrust suit against AT&T. The legislation attempted to create more competition in local telephone service by requiring Incumbent Local Exchange Carriers to provide access to their facilities for Competitive Local Exchange Carriers. This policy has thus far had limited success and much criticism.

The development of the Internet, cable services and wireless services has raised questions whether new legislative initiatives are needed as to competition in what has come to be called 'broadband' services. Congress has monitored developments but as of 2009 has not undertaken a major revision of applicable regulation. The Local Community Radio Act in the 111th Congress has gotten out of committee and will go before the house floor with bi-partisan support, and unanimous support of the FCC.

By passing the Telecommunications Act of 1996, Congress also eliminated the cap on the number of radio stations any one entity could own nationwide and also substantially loosened local radio station ownership restrictions. Substantial radio consolidation followed. Restrictions on ownership of television stations were also loosened. Public comments to the FCC indicated that the public largely believed that the severe consolidation of media ownership had resulted in harm to diversity, localism, and competition in media, and was harmful to the public interest.

=== Modernization of the FCC's information technology systems ===
David A. Bray joined the commission in 2013 as chief information officer and quickly announced goals of modernizing the FCC's legacy information technology (IT) systems, citing 200 different systems for only 1750 people a situation he found "perplexing". These efforts later were documented in a 2015 Harvard Case Study. In 2017, Christine Calvosa replaced Bray as the acting CIO of FCC.

=== 2023 reorganization and Space Bureau establishment ===
On January 4, 2023, the FCC voted unanimously to create a newly formed Space Bureau and Office of International Affairs within the agency, replacing the existing International Bureau. FCC chairwoman Jessica Rosenworcel explained that the move was done to improve the FCC's "coordination across the federal government" and to "support the 21st-century satellite industry". The decision to establish the Space Bureau was reportedly done to improve the agency's capacity to regulate Satellite Internet access. The new bureau officially launched on April 11, 2023.

=== Chairmanship of Brendan Carr and media influence campaign (2025–present) ===
The chairmanship of Brendan Carr heralded a shift in the FCC's purpose towards leveraging the bully pulpit against opponents of President Donald Trump. Under Carr, the FCC targeted media stations and networks disfavored by Trump. CNN and Politico reported the moves spurred a broad, bipartisan backlash from elected officials and legal experts who criticized it for unconstitutional policing of political speech called for major reform or abolition of the agency. During the first months of his tenure as FCC chair, Carr was criticized by former FCC commissioners and chairs, including Michael Copps, Tom Wheeler, Reed Hundt, and Alfred C. Sikes.

The FCC received criticism for several actions calling for the suspension or removal of broadcast content viewed as not being in the "public interest". Carr argued in favor of punishing broadcasters for alleged anti-conservative bias, and described content not being in the public interest if they were biased against conservatives. In July 2025, the FCC approved the merger between Paramount and Skydance Media following an agreement to install an ombudsman to remove "bias" at CBS News, which Carr stated was the ultimate factor in favor of granting approval. In September 2025, Carr's comments calling on Nexstar Media Group and Sinclair Broadcast Group to suspend airing Jimmy Kimmel Live! after comments by the host were criticized by the Trump administration and conservatives received widespread backlash. In January 2026, Carr issued a regulatory notice on the equal-time rule for television broadcasters about their morning and late-night talk shows, which Commissioner Anna Gomez criticized the claimed that it furthered Carr's "ongoing campaign to censor and control speech".

In light of warnings Carr that the fairness doctrine might apply to the talk show, CBS suppressed Stephen Colbert's interview with candidate James Talarico. It was then presented on YouTube, garnering far more views than it might have gotten if it had been aired on CBS. In March 2026, Carr threatened to revoke the broadcasting licenses of television stations "running hoaxes and news distortions" relating to the Iran war. Carr initiated an early review of Disney's broadcast licenses, the review was related to diversity, equity, and inclusion policies at ABC News, though it was allegedly expedited by comments Kimmel made at the expense of Trump and his wife, Melania. In response to the early review, Disney sued the FCC, alleging it was being punished for constitutionally protected free speech. A collection of former Democratic and Republican FCC officials wrote that the FCC was attempting to "censor Disney's and ABC's speech and send a chilling message to all broadcasters: carry speech we don't like at your peril". In August 2026, Trump demanded that NBC News reporter Kristen Welker be "reported to the FCC for rebuke or punishment" after she reported on unfavorable polling results about Trump during a TV segment.

==== Regulatory actions and attempted abandonment of independence ====
On December 17, 2025, FCC chairman Brendan Carr told a Senate committee that "The FCC is not formally an independent agency" when asked by Senator Ben Ray Luján "Yes or no ... is the FCC an independent agency?". Shortly after this all mentions of "independent" or "independence" had been removed from FCC.gov. An FCC spokesperson stated, in response to inquiries about the deletion that "With the change in Administration earlier this year, the FCC's website and materials required updating. That work continues to ensure that they reflect the positions of the agency's new leadership."

On September 30, 2025, the FCC launched a new review of its media ownership limits, amid broadcasters' lobbying push to modernize the restrictions in the face of competition from tech giants. The agency voted to take public comment, including on a rule that limits a company from owning more than two stations in a market, and a restriction on mergers between any two of the four major broadcast networks. On August 6, 2026, the FCC voted 2-1 to repeal the national television ownership cap, which limited a broadcaster’s reach to 39% of U.S. television households. The commission replaced the limit with a case-by-case review process. Carr said the cap was outdated and restricted broadcasters' ability to compete, while commissioner Anna M. Gomez argued that its removal would accelerate media consolidation and was unlawful. The decision was expected to face legal challenges.

== Commissioners ==
The commissioners of the FCC as of June 23, 2025:

| Position | Name | Party | Term started | Term expires | Max. extended time |
|---|---|---|---|---|---|
| Chair | Brendan Carr | Republican | August 11, 2017 | June 30, 2028 | January 3, 2030 |
| Member | Anna M. Gomez | Democratic | September 25, 2023 | June 30, 2026 | January 3, 2028 |
| Member | Olivia Trusty | Republican | June 23, 2025 | June 30, 2030 | January 3, 2032 |
| Member | Vacant | — | — | June 30, 2027 | January 3, 2029 |
| Member | Vacant | — | — | June 30, 2029 | January 3, 2031 |

=== Nominations ===
President Trump has nominated the following to fill seats on the board. They await Senate confirmation.

| Name | Party | Term expires | Replacing |
|---|---|---|---|
| Danielle Thumann | Republican | June 30, 2029 | Nathan Simington |

The initial group of FCC commissioners after establishment of the commission in 1934 comprised the following seven members:

| Commissioner | State | Party | Position | Term started | Term ended |
|---|---|---|---|---|---|
| Eugene O. Sykes | Mississippi | Democratic | Chairman | July 11, 1934 | April 5, 1939 |
| Thad H. Brown | Ohio | Republican | Commissioner | July 11, 1934 | June 30, 1940 |
| Paul A. Walker | Oklahoma | Democratic | Commissioner | July 11, 1934 | June 30, 1953 |
| Norman S. Case | Rhode Island | Republican | Commissioner | July 11, 1934 | June 30, 1937 |
| Irvin Stewart | Texas | Democratic | Commissioner | July 11, 1934 | June 30, 1937 |
| George Henry Payne | New York | Republican | Commissioner | July 11, 1934 | June 30, 1943 |
| Hampson Gary | Texas | Democratic | Commissioner | July 11, 1934 | January 1, 1935 |

The complete list of commissioners is available on the FCC website. Frieda B. Hennock (D-NY) was the first female commissioner of the FCC in 1948.

| Name | Party | Term started | Term expired |
|---|---|---|---|
| Eugene Octave Sykes | Democratic | July 11, 1934 | April 5, 1939 |
| Thad H. Brown | Republican | July 11, 1934 | June 30, 1940 |
| Paul A. Walker | Democratic | July 11, 1934 | June 30, 1953 |
| Norman S. Case | Republican | July 11, 1934 | June 30, 1937 |
| Irvin Stewart | Democratic | July 11, 1934 | June 30, 1937 |
| George Henry Payne | Republican | July 11, 1934 | June 30, 1943 |
| Hampson Gary | Democratic | July 11, 1934 | January 1, 1935 |
| Anning Smith Prall | Democratic | January 17, 1935 | July 23, 1937 |
| T. A. M. Craven | Democratic | August 25, 1937 | June 30, 1944 |
| T. A. M. Craven | Democratic | July 2, 1956 | March 25, 1963 |
| Frank R. McNinch | Democratic | October 1, 1937 | August 31, 1939 |
| Frederick I. Thompson | Democratic | April 13, 1939 | June 30, 1941 |
| James Lawrence Fly | Democratic | September 1, 1939 | November 13, 1944 |
| Ray C. Wakefield | Republican | March 22, 1941 | June 30, 1947 |
| Clifford Durr | Democratic | November 1, 1941 | June 30, 1948 |
| E. K. Jett | Independent | February 15, 1944 | December 31, 1947 |
| Paul A. Porter | Democratic | December 21, 1944 | February 25, 1946 |
| Charles R. Denny | Democratic | March 30, 1945 | October 31, 1947 |
| William Henry Wills | Republican | July 23, 1945 | March 6, 1946 |
| Rosel H. Hyde | Republican | April 17, 1946 | October 31, 1969 |
| Edward M. Webster | Independent | April 10, 1947 | June 30, 1956 |
| Robert Franklin Jones | Republican | September 5, 1947 | September 19, 1952 |
| Wayne Coy | Democratic | December 29, 1947 | February 21, 1952 |
| George E. Sterling | Republican | January 2, 1948 | September 30, 1954 |
| Frieda B. Hennock | Democratic | July 6, 1948 | June 30, 1955 |
| Robert T. Bartley | Democratic | March 6, 1952 | June 30, 1972 |
| Eugene H. Merrill | Democratic | October 6, 1952 | April 15, 1953 |
| John C. Doerfer | Republican | April 15, 1953 | March 10, 1960 |
| Robert E. Lee | Republican | October 6, 1953 | June 30, 1981 |
| George McConnaughey | Republican | October 4, 1954 | June 30, 1957 |
| Frederick W. Ford | Republican | August 29, 1957 | December 31, 1964 |
| John S. Cross | Democratic | May 23, 1958 | September 30, 1962 |
| Charles H. King | Republican | July 19, 1960 | March 2, 1961 |
| Newton N. Minow | Democratic | March 2, 1961 | June 1, 1963 |
| E. William Henry | Democratic | October 2, 1962 | May 1, 1966 |
| Kenneth A. Cox | Democratic | March 26, 1963 | August 31, 1970 |
| Lee Loevinger | Democratic | June 11, 1963 | June 30, 1968 |
| James Jeremiah Wadsworth | Republican | May 5, 1965 | October 31, 1969 |
| Nicholas Johnson | Democratic | July 1, 1966 | December 5, 1973 |
| H. Rex Lee | Democratic | October 28, 1968 | December 5, 1973 |
| Dean Burch | Republican | October 31, 1969 | March 8, 1974 |
| Robert Wells | Republican | November 6, 1969 | November 1, 1971 |
| Thomas J. Houser | Republican | January 6, 1971 | October 5, 1971 |
| Charlotte Thompson Reid | Republican | October 8, 1971 | July 1, 1976 |
| Richard E. Wiley | Republican | January 5, 1972 | October 13, 1977 |
| Benjamin Hooks | Democratic | July 5, 1972 | July 25, 1977 |
| James Henry Quello | Democratic | April 30, 1974 | November 1, 1997 |
| Glen O. Robinson | Democratic | July 10, 1974 | August 30, 1976 |
| Abbott M. Washburn | Republican | July 10, 1974 | October 1, 1982 |
| Joseph R. Fogarty | Democratic | September 17, 1976 | June 30, 1983 |
| Margita White | Republican | September 23, 1976 | February 28, 1979 |
| Charles D. Ferris | Democratic | October 17, 1977 | April 10, 1981 |
| Tyrone Brown | Democratic | November 15, 1977 | January 31, 1981 |
| Anne P. Jones | Republican | April 7, 1979 | May 31, 1983 |
| Mark S. Fowler | Republican | May 18, 1981 | April 17, 1987 |
| Mimi Weyforth Dawson | Republican | July 6, 1981 | December 3, 1987 |
| Henry M. Rivera | Democratic | August 10, 1981 | September 15, 1985 |
| Stephen A. Sharp | Republican | October 4, 1982 | June 30, 1983 |
| Dennis R. Patrick | Republican | December 2, 1983 | April 17, 1987 |
| Patricia Diaz Dennis | Democratic | June 25, 1986 | September 29, 1989 |
| Alfred C. Sikes | Republican | August 8, 1989 | January 19, 1993 |
| Sherrie P. Marshall | Republican | August 21, 1989 | April 30, 1993 |
| Andrew C. Barrett | Republican | September 8, 1989 | March 30, 1996 |
| Ervin Duggan | Democratic | February 28, 1990 | January 30, 1994 |
| Reed Hundt | Democratic | November 29, 1993 | November 3, 1997 |
| Susan Ness | Democratic | May 19, 1994 | May 30, 2001 |
| Rachelle B. Chong | Republican | May 23, 1994 | November 3, 1997 |
| William Kennard | Democratic | November 3, 1997 | January 19, 2001 |
| Harold W. Furchtgott-Roth | Republican | November 3, 1997 | May 30, 2001 |
| Michael Powell | Republican | November 3, 1997 | March 17, 2005 |
| Gloria Tristani | Democratic | November 3, 1997 | September 7, 2001 |
| Kathleen Q. Abernathy | Republican | May 31, 2001 | December 9, 2005 |
| Michael Copps | Democratic | May 31, 2001 | December 31, 2011 |
| Kevin Martin | Republican | July 3, 2001 | January 19, 2009 |
| Jonathan Adelstein | Democratic | December 3, 2002 | June 29, 2009 |
| Deborah Tate | Republican | January 3, 2006 | January 3, 2009 |
| Robert M. McDowell | Republican | June 1, 2006 | May 17, 2013 |
| Julius Genachowski | Democratic | June 29, 2009 | May 17, 2013 |
| Meredith Attwell Baker | Republican | July 31, 2009 | June 3, 2011 |
| Mignon Clyburn | Democratic | August 3, 2009 | June 6, 2018 |
| Jessica Rosenworcel | Democratic | May 11, 2012 | January 3, 2017 |
| Jessica Rosenworcel | Democratic | August 11, 2017 | January 20, 2025 |
| Ajit Pai | Republican | May 14, 2012 | January 20, 2021 |
| Tom Wheeler | Democratic | November 4, 2013 | January 20, 2017 |
| Michael O'Rielly | Republican | November 4, 2013 | December 11, 2020 |
| Brendan Carr | Republican | August 11, 2017 | Present |
| Geoffrey Starks | Democratic | January 30, 2019 | June 6, 2025 |
| Nathan Simington | Republican | December 14, 2020 | June 6, 2025 |
| Anna M. Gomez | Democratic | September 25, 2023 | Present |
| Olivia Trusty | Republican | June 23, 2025 | Present |

== Media policy ==
=== Broadcast radio and television ===
The FCC regulates broadcast stations, repeater stations as well as commercial broadcasting operators who operate and repair certain radiotelephone, radio and television stations. Broadcast licenses are to be renewed if the station meets the "public interest, convenience, or necessity". The FCC's enforcement powers include fines and broadcast license revocation (see FCC MB Docket 04-232). Burden of proof would be on the complainant in a petition to deny.

=== Cable and satellite ===
The FCC first promulgated rules for cable television in 1965, with cable and satellite television now regulated by the FCC under Title VI of the Communications Act. Congress added Title VI in the Cable Communications Policy Act of 1984, and made substantial modifications to Title VI in the Cable Television and Consumer Protection and Competition Act of 1992. Further modifications to promote cross-modal competition (telephone, video, etc.) were made in the Telecommunications Act of 1996, leading to the current regulatory structure.

=== Content regulation and indecency ===
Broadcast television and radio stations are subject to FCC regulations including restrictions against indecency or obscenity. The Supreme Court has repeatedly held, beginning soon after the passage of the Communications Act of 1934, that the inherent scarcity of radio spectrum allows the government to impose some types of content restrictions on broadcast license holders notwithstanding the First Amendment. Cable and satellite providers are also subject to some content regulations under Title VI of the Communications Act such as the prohibition on obscenity, although the limitations are not as restrictive compared to broadcast stations.

The 1981 inauguration of Ronald Reagan as President of the United States accelerated an already ongoing shift in the FCC towards a decidedly more market-oriented stance. A number of regulations felt to be outdated were removed, most controversially the Fairness Doctrine in 1987.

In terms of indecency fines, the FCC took no action on the case FCC v. Pacifica until 1987, about ten years after the landmark United States Supreme Court decision that defined the power of the FCC over indecent material as applied to broadcasting.

After the 1990s had passed, the FCC began to increase its censorship and enforcement of indecency regulations in the early 2000s to include a response to the Janet Jackson "wardrobe malfunction" that occurred during the halftime show of Super Bowl XXXVIII.

Then on June 15, 2006, President George W. Bush signed into law the Broadcast Decency Enforcement Act of 2005 sponsored by then-Senator Sam Brownback, a former broadcaster himself, and endorsed by Congressman Fred Upton of Michigan who authored a similar bill in the United States House of Representatives. The new law stiffened the penalties for each violation of the act. The Federal Communications Commission was empowered to impose fines in the amount of $325,000 for each violation by each station that violated decency standards. The legislation raised the fine ten times over the previous maximum of $32,500 per violation.

In March 2026, during the war between the United States and Iran, the Federal Communications Commission faced criticism for Brendan Carr's comments suggesting that broadcasters airing "distortions" about the conflict could risk losing their licenses, a stance that was widely reported by international media outlets, including Al Jazeera.

=== Media ownership ===
The FCC has established rules limiting the national share of media ownership of broadcast radio or television stations. It has also established cross-ownership rules limiting ownership of a newspaper and broadcast station in the same market, in order to ensure a diversity of viewpoints in each market and serve the needs of each local market.

==== Diversity ====
In the second half of 2006, groups such as the National Hispanic Media Coalition, the National Latino Media Council, the National Association of Hispanic Journalists, the National Institute for Latino Policy, the League of United Latin American Citizens (LULAC) and others held town hall meetings in California, New York and Texas on media diversity as it affects Latinos and minority communities. They documented widespread and deeply felt community concerns about the negative effects of media concentration and consolidation on racial-ethnic diversity in staffing and programming. At these Latino town hall meetings, the issue of the FCC's lax monitoring of obscene and pornographic material in Spanish-language radio and the lack of racial and national-origin diversity among Latino staff in Spanish-language television were other major themes.

President Barack Obama appointed Mark Lloyd to the FCC in the newly created post of associate general counsel/chief diversity officer.

==== Localism ====
Numerous controversies have surrounded the city of license concept as the internet has made it possible to broadcast a single signal to every owned station in the nation at once, particularly when Clear Channel, now IHeartMedia, became the largest FM broadcasting corporation in the US after the Telecommunications Act of 1996 became law - owning over 1,200 stations at its peak. As part of its license to buy more radio stations, Clear Channel was forced to divest all TV stations.

=== Digital television transition ===
To facilitate the adoption of digital television, the FCC issued a second digital TV (DTV) channel to each holder of an analog TV station license. All stations were required to buy and install all new equipment (transmitters, TV antennas, and even entirely new broadcast towers), and operate for years on both channels. Each licensee was required to return one of their two channels following the end of the digital television transition.

After delaying the original deadlines of 2006, 2008, and eventually February 17, 2009, on concerns about elderly and rural folk, on June 12, 2009, all full-power analog terrestrial TV licenses in the U.S. were terminated as part of the DTV transition, leaving terrestrial television available only from digital channels and a few low-power LPTV stations. To help U.S. consumers through the conversion, Congress established a federally sponsored DTV Converter Box Coupon Program for two free converters per household.

== Wireline policy ==
The FCC regulates telecommunications services under Title II of the Communications Act of 1934. Title II imposes common carrier regulation under which carriers offering their services to the general public must provide services to all customers and may not discriminate based on the identity of the customer or the content of the communication. This is similar to and adapted from the regulation of transportation providers (railroad, airline, shipping, etc.) and some public utilities. Wireless carriers providing telecommunications services are also generally subject to Title II regulation except as exempted by the FCC.

=== Telephone ===
The FCC regulates interstate telephone services under Title II. The Telecommunications Act of 1996 was the first major legislative reform since the 1934 act and took several steps to de-regulate the telephone market and promote competition in both the local and long-distance marketplace.

==== From monopoly to competition ====
The important relationship of the FCC and the American Telephone and Telegraph (AT&T) Company evolved over the decades. For many years, the FCC and state officials agreed to regulate the telephone system as a natural monopoly. The FCC controlled telephone rates and imposed other restrictions under Title II to limit the profits of AT&T and ensure nondiscriminatory pricing.

In the 1960s, the FCC began allowing other long-distance companies, namely MCI, to offer specialized services. In the 1970s, the FCC allowed other companies to expand offerings to the public. A lawsuit in 1982 led by the Justice Department after AT&T underpriced other companies, resulted in the breakup of the Bell System from AT&T. Beginning in 1984, the FCC implemented a new goal that all long-distance companies had equal access to the local phone companies' customers. Effective January 1, 1984, the Bell System's many member-companies were variously merged into seven independent "Regional Holding Companies", also known as Regional Bell Operating Companies (RBOCs), or "Baby Bells". This divestiture reduced the book value of AT&T by approximately 70%.

=== Internet ===
The FCC initially exempted "information services" such as broadband Internet access from regulation under Title II. The FCC held that information services were distinct from telecommunications services that are subject to common carrier regulation.

However, Section 706 of the Telecommunications Act of 1996 required the FCC to help accelerate deployment of "advanced telecommunications capability" which included high-quality voice, data, graphics, and video, and to regularly assess its availability. In August 2015, the FCC said that nearly 55 million Americans did not have access to broadband capable of delivering high-quality voice, data, graphics and video offerings.

On February 26, 2015, the FCC reclassified broadband Internet access as a telecommunications service, thus subjecting it to Title II regulation, although several exemptions were also created. The reclassification was done in order to give the FCC a legal basis for imposing net neutrality rules (see below), after earlier attempts to impose such rules on an "information service" had been overturned in court.

==== Net neutrality ====
In 2005, the FCC formally established the following principles: To encourage broadband deployment and preserve and promote the open and interconnected nature of the public Internet, Consumers are entitled to access the lawful Internet content of their choice; Consumers are entitled to run applications and use services of their choice, subject to the needs of law enforcement; Consumers are entitled to connect their choice of legal devices that do not harm the network; Consumers are entitled to competition among network providers, application and service providers, and content providers. However, broadband providers were permitted to engage in "reasonable network management".

On August 1, 2008, the FCC formally voted 3-to-2 to uphold a complaint against Comcast, the largest cable company in the US, ruling that it had illegally inhibited users of its high-speed Internet service from using file-sharing software. The FCC imposed no fine, but required Comcast to end such blocking in 2008. FCC chairman Kevin J. Martin said the order was meant to set a precedent that Internet providers, and indeed all communications companies, could not prevent customers from using their networks the way they see fit unless there is a good reason. In an interview Martin stated that "We are preserving the open character of the Internet" and "We are saying that network operators can't block people from getting access to any content and any applications." Martin's successor, Julius Genachowski has maintained that the FCC has no plans to regulate the internet, saying: "I've been clear repeatedly that we're not going to regulate the Internet." The Comcast case highlighted broader issues of whether new legislation is needed to force Internet providers to maintain net neutrality, i.e. treat all uses of their networks equally. The legal complaint against Comcast related to BitTorrent, software that is commonly used for downloading larger files.

In December 2010, the FCC revised the principles from the original Internet policy statement and adopted the Open Internet Order consisting of three rules regarding the Internet: Transparency. Fixed and mobile broadband providers must disclose the network management practices, performance characteristics, and terms and conditions of their broadband services; No blocking. Fixed broadband providers may not block lawful content, applications, services, or non-harmful devices; mobile broadband providers may not block lawful websites, or block applications that compete with their voice or video telephony services; and No unreasonable discrimination.

On January 14, 2014, Verizon won its lawsuit over the FCC in the United States Court of Appeals for the District of Columbia Court. Verizon was suing over increased regulation on internet service providers on the grounds that "even though the commission has general authority to regulate in this arena, it may not impose requirements that contravene express statutory mandates. Given that the commission has chosen to classify broadband providers in a manner that exempts them from treatment as common carriers, the Communications Act expressly prohibits the commission from nonetheless regulating them as such."

After these setbacks in court, in April 2014 the FCC issued a Notice of Proposed Rulemaking regarding a path forward for The Open Internet Order. On November 10, 2014, President Barack Obama created a YouTube video recommending that the FCC reclassify broadband Internet service as a telecommunications service in order to preserve net neutrality.

On February 26, 2015, the FCC ruled in favor of net neutrality by applying Title II (common carrier) of the Communications Act of 1934 and Section 706 of the Telecommunications act of 1996 to the Internet.

The rules prompted debate about the applicability of First Amendment protections to Internet service providers and edge providers. Republican commissioner Ajit Pai said the Open Internet Order "posed a special danger" to "First Amendment speech, freedom of expression, [and] even freedom of association". Democratic member and then-Chairman Tom Wheeler said in response that the rules were "no more a plan to regulate the Internet than the First Amendment is a plan to regulate free speech. They both stand for the same concept." According to a Washington Post poll, 81% of Americans supported net neutrality in 2014, with 81% of Democrats and 85% of Republicans saying they opposed allowing Internet providers to charge websites for faster speeds.

On March 12, 2015, the FCC released the specific details of the net neutrality rules. On April 13, 2015, the FCC published the final rule on its new "Net Neutrality" regulations.

On April 27, 2017, FCC chairman Ajit Pai released a draft Notice of Proposed Rulemaking that would revise the legal foundation for the agency's Open Internet regulations. The NPRM was voted on at the May 18th Open Meeting. On December 14, the commission voted 3–2 in favor of passing the repeal of the 2015 rules. The repeal formally took effect on June 11, 2018, when the 2015 rules expired.

However, in April 2024, the FCC re-adopted the net neutrality rules by 3–2 vote, prohibiting internet service providers from blocking or limiting user access, reviving the regulations repealed in 2017. On January 2, 2025, the United States Court of Appeals for the Sixth Circuit ruled that the FCC lacked the authority to adopt net neutrality regulations. The court held that the regulations violated federal law because broadband Internet service providers are classified as information service providers, not telecommunications service providers.

=== NSA wiretapping ===
When it emerged in 2006 that AT&T, BellSouth and Verizon may have broken U.S. laws by aiding the National Security Agency in possible illegal wiretapping of its customers, Congressional representatives called for an FCC investigation into whether or not those companies broke the law. The FCC declined to investigate, however, claiming that it could not investigate due to the classified nature of the program – a move that provoked the criticism of members of Congress.

"Today the watchdog agency that oversees the country's telecommunications industry refused to investigate the nation's largest phone companies' reported disclosure of phone records to the NSA", said Rep. Edward Markey (D-Mass.) in response to the decision. "The FCC, which oversees the protection of consumer privacy under the Communications Act of 1934, has taken a pass at investigating what is estimated to be the nation's largest violation of consumer privacy ever to occur. If the oversight body that monitors our nation's communications is stepping aside then Congress must step in."

== Wireless policy ==
The FCC regulates all non-Federal uses of radio frequency spectrum in the United States under Title III of the Communications Act of 1934. In addition to over-the-air broadcast television and radio stations, this includes commercial mobile (i.e., mobile phone) services, amateur radio, citizen's band radio, theatrical wireless microphone installations, and a very wide variety of other services. Use of radio spectrum by U.S. federal government agencies is coordinated by the National Telecommunications and Information Administration, an agency within the Department of Commerce.

=== Commercial mobile service ===
Commercial mobile radio service (CMRS) providers, including all mobile phone carriers, are subject to spectrum and wireless regulations under Title III (similar to broadcasters) as well as common carrier regulations under Title II (similar to wireline telephone carriers), except as provided by the FCC.

==== Spectrum auctions ====
Beginning in 1994, the FCC has usually assigned commercial spectrum licenses through the use of competitive bidding, i.e., spectrum auctions. These auctions have raised tens of billions of dollars for the U.S. Treasury, and the FCC's auction approach is now widely emulated throughout the world. The FCC typically obtains spectrum for auction that has been reclaimed from other uses, such as spectrum returned by television broadcasters after the digital television transition, or spectrum made available by federal agencies able to shift their operations to other bands.

=== Unlicensed spectrum ===
Normally, any intentional radio transmission requires an FCC license pursuant to Title III. However, in recent decades the FCC has also opened some spectrum bands for unlicensed operations, typically restricting them to low power levels conducive to short-range applications. This has facilitated the development of a very wide range of common technologies from wireless garage door openers, cordless phones, and baby monitors to Wi-Fi and Bluetooth among others. However, unlicensed devices — like most radio transmission equipment — must still receive technical approval from the FCC before being sold into the marketplace, including ensuring that such devices cannot be modified by end users to increase transmit power above FCC limits.

==== White spaces ====
"White spaces" are radio frequencies that went unused after the federally mandated transformation of analog TV signals to digital. On October 15, 2008, FCC Chairman Kevin Martin announced his support for the unlicensed use of white spaces. Martin said he was "hoping to take advantage of utilizing these airwaves for broadband services to allow for unlicensed technologies and new innovations in that space".

Google, Microsoft and other companies are vying for the use of this white-space to support innovation in Wi-Fi technology. Broadcasters and wireless microphone manufacturers fear that the use of white space would "disrupt their broadcasts and the signals used in sports events and concerts". Cell phone providers such as T-Mobile US have mounted pressure on the FCC to instead offer up the white space for sale to boost competition and market leverage.

On November 4, 2008, the FCC commissioners unanimously agreed to open up unused broadcast TV spectrum for unlicensed use.

=== Amateur radio ===
Amateur radio operators in the United States must be licensed by the FCC before transmitting. While the FCC maintains control of the written testing standards, it no longer administers the exams, having delegated that function to private volunteer organizations. No amateur license class requires examination in Morse code; neither the FCC nor the volunteer organizations test code skills for amateur licenses. (Note: The Federal Communications Commission (FCC) officially ended the Morse code proficiency test for all amateur radio license classes on February 23, 2007. The transition occurred in several stages over the preceding decades: 1991: The FCC first introduced a "no-code" Technician Class license, though code proficiency was still required to access frequencies below 30 MHz. 2000: The requirement for higher-level licenses (General and Amateur Extra) was standardized and reduced to a single speed of 5 words per minute (WPM). 2003: The International Telecommunication Union (ITU) modified international regulations, leaving it to individual countries to decide if Morse code should remain a requirement. December 15, 2006: The FCC released the official Report and Order announcing the total elimination of the Morse code exam. February 23, 2007: The new rules became effective, allowing applicants to earn any class of license by passing only the written theory examinations.)

=== Broadcasting tower database ===
An FCC database provides information about the height and year built of broadcasting towers in the US. It does not contain information about the structural types of towers or about the height of towers used by Federal agencies, such as time signal transmitters like WWVB, most NDBs, LORAN-C transmission towers or VLF transmission facilities of the US Navy, or about most towers not used for transmission like the BREN Tower. These are instead tracked by the Federal Aviation Administration as obstructions to air navigation.

=== Criticism for use of proprietary standards ===
In 2023, Andrew Tisinger criticized the FCC for ignoring international open standards, and instead choosing proprietary closed standards, or allowing communications companies to do so and implement the anticompetitive practice of vendor lock-in.

For digital radio, the FCC chose proprietary HD Radio, which crowds the existing FM broadcast band and even AM broadcast band with in-band adjacent-channel sidebands, which create noise in other stations. This is in contrast to worldwide DAB, which uses unused TV channels in the VHF band III range. This too has patent fees, while DAB does not. While there has been some effort by iBiquity to lower them, the fees for HD Radio are still an enormous expense when converting each station, and this fee structure presents a potentially high cost barrier to entry for community radio and other non-commercial educational stations when entering the HD Radio market. (Under the subsidiary communications authority principle, FM stations could in theory use any in-band on-channel digital system of their choosing; a competing service, FMeXtra, briefly gained some traction in the early 21st century but has since been discontinued.)

Satellite radio (also called SDARS by the FCC) uses two proprietary standards instead of DAB-S, which requires users to change equipment when switching from one provider to the other, and prevents other competitors from offering new choices as stations can do on terrestrial radio. Had the FCC picked DAB-T for terrestrial radio, no separate satellite receiver would have been needed at all, and the only difference from DAB receivers in the rest of the world would be the need to tune S band instead of L band.

In mobile telephony, the FCC abandoned the "any lawful device" principle decided against AT&T landlines, and has instead allowed each mobile phone company to dictate what its customers can use.

== Public consultation ==
As the public interest standard has always been important to the FCC when determining and shaping policy, so too has the relevance of public involvement in U.S. communication policy making. The FCC Record is the comprehensive compilation of decisions, reports, public notices, and other documents of the FCC, published since 1986.

=== History of the issue ===
==== 1927 Radio Act ====
In the 1927 Radio Act, which was formulated by the predecessor of the FCC (the Federal Radio Commission), section 4(k) stipulated that the commission was authorized to hold hearings for the purpose of developing a greater understanding of the issues for which rules were being crafted. Section 4(k) stated that:

Except as otherwise provided in this Act, the commission, from time to time, as public convenience, interest, or necessity requires, shall... have the authority to hold hearings, summon witnesses, administer oaths, compel the production of books, documents, and papers and to make such investigations as may be necessary in the performance of its duties.

Thus, it is clear that public consultation, or at least consultation with outside bodies was regarded as central to the commission's job from early on. Though it should not be surprising, the act also stipulated that the commission should verbally communicate with those being assigned licenses. Section 11 of the act noted:

If upon examination of any application for a station license or for the renewal or modification of a station license the licensing authority shall determine that public interest, convenience, or necessity would be served by the granting thereof, it shall authorize the issuance, renewal, or modification thereof in accordance with said finding. In the event the licensing authority upon examination of any such application does not reach such decision with respect thereto, it shall notify the applicant thereof, shall fix and give notice of a time and place for hearing thereon, and shall afford such applicant an opportunity to be heard under such rules and regulations as it may prescribe.

==== Public hearings ====
As early as 1927, there is evidence that public hearings were indeed held; among them, hearings to assess the expansion of the radio broadcast band. At these early hearings, the goal of having a broad range of viewpoints presented was evident, as not only broadcasters, but also radio engineers and manufacturers were in attendance. Numerous groups representing the general public appeared at the hearings as well, including amateur radio operators and inventors as well as representatives of radio listeners' organizations.

While some speakers at the 1927 hearings referred to having received "invitations", Herbert Hoover's assistant observed in a letter at the time that "the Radio Commission has sent out a blanket invitation to all people in the country who desire either to appear in person or to submit their recommendations in writing. I do not understand that the commission has sent for any particular individuals, however" [Letter from George Akerson, assistant to Sec. Hoover, to Mrs. James T. Rourke, Box 497, Commerce Period Papers, Herbert Hoover Presidential Library (March 29, 1927)] (FN 14)

Including members of the general public in the discussion was regarded (or at least articulated) as very important to the commission's deliberations. In fact, FCC commissioner Bellows noted at the time that "it is the radio listener we must consider above everyone else." Though there were numerous representatives of the general public at the hearing, some expressing their opinions to the commission verbally, overall there was not a great turnout of everyday listeners at the hearings.

Though not a constant fixture of the communications policy-making process, public hearings were occasionally organized as a part of various deliberation processes as the years progressed. For example, seven years after the enactment of the Radio Act, the Communications Act of 1934 was passed, creating the FCC. That year the federal government's National Recovery Agency (associated with the New Deal period) held public hearings as a part of its deliberations over the creation of new broadcasting codes.

A few years later, the FCC held hearings to address early cross-ownership issues; specifically, whether newspaper companies owning radio stations was in the public interest. These "newspaper divorcement hearings" were held between 1941 and 1944, though it appears that these hearings were geared mostly towards discussion by industry stakeholders. Around the same time, the commission held hearings as a part of its evaluation of the national television standard, and in 1958 held additional hearings on the television network broadcasting rules. Though public hearings were organized somewhat infrequently, there was an obvious public appeal. In his now famous "vast wasteland" speech in 1961, FCC chairman Newton Minow noted that the commission would hold a "well advertised public hearing" in each community to assure broadcasters were serving the public interest, clearly a move to reconnect the commission with the public interest (at least rhetorically).

On September 5, 2023, commissioner Nathan Simington held a public forum on the tech-focused social news site, Hacker News.

== See also ==
=== Media policy ===
- 1978 Broadcast Policy Statement on minority ownership
- Bleep censor
- Broadcast Standards and Practices (US)
- Censorship of broadcasting in the United States
- Public Broadcasting Act of 1967
- Public, educational, and government access (PEG)

=== Wireline/broadband policy ===
- Comcast Corp. v. FCC
- National broadband plans from around the world

=== Wireless policy ===
- Frequency assignment authority
- Open spectrum
- Part 15 (FCC rules)

=== International ===
- International Telecommunication Union
- List of telecommunications regulatory bodies
