= Mark Lloyd (lawyer) =

American lawyer

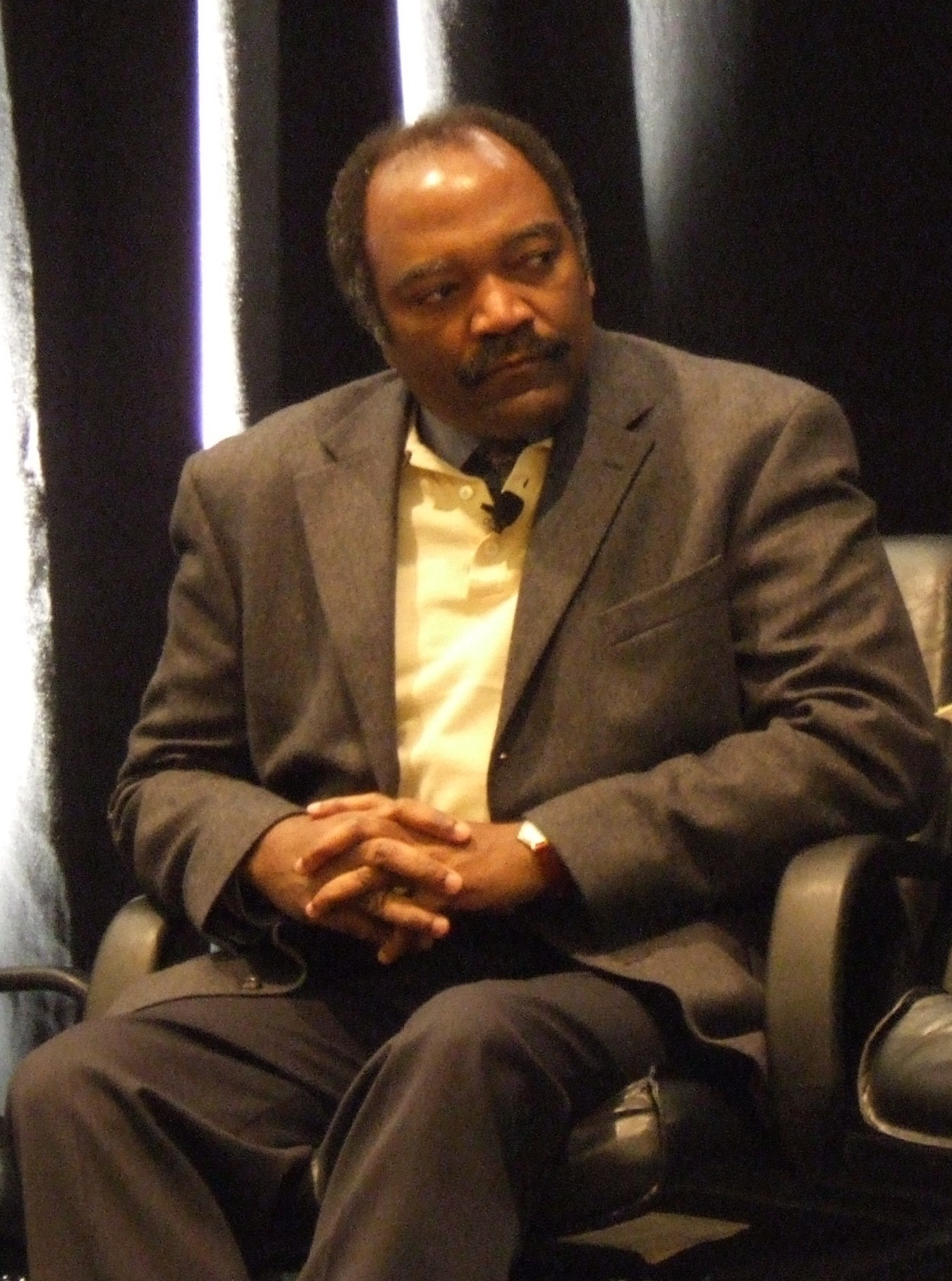

Former Associate General Counsel and Chief Diversity Officer FCC

Personal details
- Education: University of Michigan; Georgetown University Law Center

Mark Lloyd is a former associate general counsel and Chief Diversity Officer at the Federal Communications Commission of the United States from 2009-2012. He was previously the vice president for strategic initiatives at the Leadership Conference on Civil Rights. Lloyd was also an affiliate professor at the Georgetown Public Policy Institute, and in the years from 2002-2004 Lloyd was a visiting lecturer at MIT where he conducted research and taught about communications policy.

== Education ==
Mark Lloyd has an undergraduate degree from the University of Michigan and a law degree from the Georgetown University Law Center.

== Professional career ==
- NBC, broadcast journalist
- CNN, broadcast journalist
- Benton Foundation, General Counsel
- Dow, Lohnes & Albertson, Communications Attorney
- Civil Rights Forum on Communications Policy
- Georgetown Public Policy Institute, Affiliate Professor
- Massachusetts Institute of Technology, 2002–2004, Martin Luther King Jr. Visiting Scholar
- Center for American Progress, through 2007, Senior Fellow
- Leadership Conference on Civil Rights, 2008–2009, Vice President for Strategic Initiatives
- Federal Communications Commission, Associate General Counsel, Chief Diversity Officer, 2009-2012
- New America Foundation, Director- Media Policy Initiative, 2012-2013
- USC Annenberg School for Communication and Journalism, Visiting Professor and Wallis Annenberg Chair in Communication and Journalism, current

=== Board seats ===
(incomplete list)

- Independent Television Service
- OMB Watch
- Center for Democracy and Technology
- Leadership Conference on Civil Rights Education Fund

=== Consultancies ===
- Clinton Administration
- John D. and Catherine T. MacArthur Foundation
- Open Society Institute
- The Smithsonian Institution

== Controversy ==
Lloyd has been targeted by conservative commentators such as Glenn Beck, with the aim of forcing him to resign, as happened with former White House advisor Van Jones.

Beck broadcast a short video of Lloyd's comments at a 2008 conference on media reform. Lloyd described the importance of media in Rwanda and Venezuela. He referred to the events in Venezuela as "an incredible revolution." This clip was used to claim that Lloyd generally supports Chavez. Lloyd has stated that he does not support Chavez. Over 50 public interest groups have defended Lloyd, calling conservative claims "false and misleading."

== Publications ==
Prologue to a Farce, Communication and Democracy in America, University of Illinois Press (Urbana: 2006).

Red Lion Confusions, Administrative Law Review, Washington College of Law/American University, Vol. 60, Number 4, 2009.

Bringing Broadband Up to Speed, Science Next, Jonathan Moreno and Rick Weiss, editors (Washington, DC: Bellevue Literary Press, 2009); see also.

Access to Media, Encyclopedia of Journalism (Thousand Oaks, CA: Sage Publications, September 25, 2009).

Media, Creativity and the Public Good, (Washington, DC: Aspen Institute, 2007).

Local Media Diversity Matters:Measure Media Diversity According to Democratic Values, Not Market Values, (with Phil Napoli) Center for American Progress, Washington, DC, January 2007.

Radio and Localism-What Went Wrong, Context, Winter/Spring 2006, Center for Communications and Community/UCLA, Los Angeles, CA, 2006.

Lessons for Realistic Radicals in the Information Age, The Future of Media, Robert W. McChesney, Russell Newman and Ben Scott, editors, (New York: Seven Stories Press, 2005).

African Americans and Information Communications Technology, Navigating the Network Society: The Challenges and Opportunities of the Digital Age (Thousand Oaks, CA:Sage Publications, 2005).

The Digital Divide and Equal Access to Justice, Hastings Communications and Entertainment Law Journal (Univ. of California), Vol. 24, No. 4, Summer 2002.

Progress and Proposals: A Civil Rights Agenda in Communications Policy, Rights at Risk - Equality in an Age of Terrorism (Citizens’ Commission on Civil Rights, Washington, DC, 2002/ updated 2006).

Whose Voices Count, a Proposal to Strengthen the Communications Capability of Community Groups, A Digital Gift to the Nation, Lawrence Grossman and Newt Minnow, Editors (Digital Promise Project-Century Foundation Press, Washington, DC, 2001).

The Value of the Tax Certificate (w/ Kofi Ofori), Federal Communications Law Journal, Vol. 51, No. 3, Indiana University School of Law – Bloomington, Federal Communications Bar Association, May 1999.
