= Stephen A. Sharp =

Commissioner of the Federal Communications Commission
- In office October 4, 1982 – June 30, 1983
- President: Ronald Reagan
- Preceded by: Abbott M. Washburn
- Succeeded by: Seat abolished

Personal details
- Born: June 10, 1947 (age 77); Columbus, Ohio
- Political party: Republican

Stephen A. Sharp (born June 10, 1947) is an American attorney who served as a Commissioner of the Federal Communications Commission from 1982 to 1983.

In 1992, he was convicted of sexually assaulting a minor and sentenced to 10 years in prison.
