= 1978 Broadcast Policy Statement on minority ownership =

American communications policy

The 1978 Broadcast Policy Statement on minority ownership is a publicly issued statement by the Federal Communications Commission (FCC) regarding the state of minority and gender based ownership, the implications of previous ownership policies, and by taking affirmative action set into place two new additional policy measures aimed at progressing and encouraging continued diversity in media ownership. In this statement the FCC officially set forward two new programs favoring minority ownership of broadcasting facilities.

== Policy details ==
First, the program sought to stimulate diversity with the Tax Certificate Policy. This policy worked by awarding like-kind tax exchange breaks to licensees who sell their licenses to minorities. This was a two-year like-kind exchange, whereby the seller would not be required to pay taxes on money made by selling their license, as long as the capital gains are reinvested into a similar communication industry within two years of the sale. In addition the second program implemented through this statement was the Distress Sale Policy, which held that any license owners facing scrutiny by the FCC and potential license revocation, can sell their station to a minority buyer for 75% of the appraised value. The benefit of the Distress Sale Policy for licensees under investigation by the FCC, is that once they sell their license to a minority owner, the FCC would reward them by ceasing their inquiry into the licensee. The statement would also formalize the Comparative Hearing Process.

=== Background on the Comparative Hearing Process ===
The Comparative Hearing Process is a system that was originally set into place by the Communications Act of 1934, and used to determine which applicant for a broadcast license is the best qualified to hold the license. In the event that more than one applicant applied for the same broadcast license a comparative hearing became necessary. An Administrative Law Judge would preside over hearing proceedings. There are factors that the FCC took into consideration when deciding whom to allocate a license to. The commission has for long been consistent in its position that ownership diversity will result in viewpoint diversity, and viewpoint diversity advances the public interest. The courts mostly agreed with this interpretation of the "public interest." Trends in the licensing process, and the actions of challenging applicants who wanted to obtain a license would make their way through deliberation via FCC rulings and court decisions which were ultimately upheld and added to the United States Code. The logic behind these Supreme Court decisions and affirmative action programs by the commission are demonstrated in different court rulings and FCC policy statements. In the 1965 Policy Statement on Comparative Broadcast Hearings the FCC made diversification a highly important component for awarding broadcasting licensees. The commission had established that the criteria of 'public convenience and necessity' was too broad a definition in determining whom to award licenses.

=== Pretext to the 1978 policy statement ===
Subsequently, the 1965 statement defined two primary objectives to guide the process of comparison. These are, "the best practicable service to the public" and "a maximum diffusion of control of the media of mass communications." In between 1965 and the late seventies, social circumstances and legal disputes would alter these interpretations multiple times in comparative hearings to include race specifically (instead of just "diversity") as a determining factor. In this time, FCC Chairman Richard Wiley is credited with taking one of the first steps in seeing what could be done to grow minority ownership. To that end, he charged his staff with the task of examining the possibilities. More than ten years later, under the Chairmanship of Charles Ferris, the 1978 Broadcast Policy Statement would finally formalize the rules for awarding merit based on minority preference.

These programs were devised and set into effect to improve previous policy rulings that were intended to encourage a broad range of diversity. The policy statement is how the Commission responded to prior FCC and High Court rulings regarding the comparative hearing process which they deemed ineffective. In the 1978 Statement on Minority Ownership the commission lays out their concern:

While the broadcasting industry has, on the whole, responded positively to its ascertainment obligations and has made significant strides in its employment practices, we are compelled to observe that the views of racial minorities continue to be inadequately represented in the broadcast media. This situation is detrimental not only to the minority audience but to all of the viewing and listening public. Adequate representations of minority viewpoints in programming serves not only the needs and interests of the minority community but also enriches and educates the non-minority audience.

This scrutiny by the Federal Communications Commission (FCC) comes after a trail of failed policy rulings by the Commission and the Supreme Court. The rulings, spanning the 1960s and 1970s would write and rewrite the thought behind how to interpret these guidelines for serving the public interest and maximizing diversity in media ownership, in accordance with the FCC's mission and purpose. It was around this time that the FCC started to pay closer attention to issues about race and gender as they relate to awarding broadcast licenses. Until 1949 in the U.S., a minority-owned radio station did not exist, and there were no minority-owned television stations until 1973.

In addition to the Tax Certificate Policy and the Distress Sale Policy incentives for encouraging diversity, the 1978 Broadcast Policy Statement authorized the use of comparative credit or favorable consideration for minority applicants. These comparative hearings would award merit to applicants poised to contribute to the commission's goal of broadening ownership inclusion, and their aim for a "diversity of viewpoints". Earning this favorable consideration meant that the applicant would be an active participant in the facilities daily operations, and serve a practicable purpose to the community in terms of content and viewpoints. Eventually the Distress Sale Policy was overturned in 1987 by a 2–1 vote within the U.S. Court of Appeals for the District of Columbia, and later, the Tax Certificate Policy was repealed by congress in 1995 with perceived abuses being the reason. In the 1990s the court would eliminate policies that awarded extra credit using race and gender as a basis for consideration. This period saw a movement away from policies concerning the use of gender or racial factors in comparative hearings and employment practices, and the 1996 Telecommunications Act eliminated the comparative hearing process for renewal of broadcast licensing entirely.
