= Kelly McDowell =

American lawyer

Hobart Kelliston McDowell III
- Born: November 18, 1952; Chicago, Illinois
- Died: September 11, 2017 (aged 64); Gig Harbor, Washington
- Education: A.B. 1974 (economics); J.D. 1977 John M. Olin fellow
- Alma mater: Deerfield Academy, 1970; Stanford University; UCLA School of Law
- Occupation: lawyer
- Title: former Mayor
- Children: Kelliston
- Parent(s): Martha Louise Shea McDowell; Hobart K. "Bart" McDowell Jr.
- Relatives: Robert M. McDowell, brother

Hobart Kelliston McDowell III (November 18, 1952 - September 11, 2017) was an American business attorney, government affairs consultant and politician. He was mayor of El Segundo, California for six years (2004–2010), and served as a member of the city council for twelve years (1998–2010).

McDowell opposed expansion of LAX, threatening to sue the Los Angeles City Council. He reached a deal with Los Angeles to develop an alternative to expansion in return for dropping the lawsuit. He also threatened to sue over a plan by the Metropolitan Transportation Authority to put a rail yard in El Segundo. He also fought to keep the Los Angeles Air Force Base open.

== Personal ==
Hobart Kelliston McDowell III Hobart Kelliston McDowell III was the son of Hobart K. McDowell Jr. and Martha Louise Shea McDowell. He had a sister, Tina S. McDowell, and two brothers, Joseph S. McDowell and Robert M. McDowell. He had one son, Kelliston.
