= Rachelle B. Chong =

American lawyer

Commissioner of the Federal Communications Commission
- In office May 23, 1994 – November 3, 1997
- President: Bill Clinton
- Preceded by: Sherrie P. Marshall
- Succeeded by: Michael Powell

Personal details
- Born: June 22, 1959 (age 66) Stockton, California
- Party: Republican
- Education: University of California, Berkeley (B.A.); University of California, Hastings (J.D.)

Rachelle B. Chong (born June 22, 1959) is an American attorney and former government official who served as a Commissioner of the Federal Communications Commission (FCC) from 1994 to 1997. A member of the Republican Party, Chong was the first Asian-American to serve on the FCC. Chong later served as a commissioner of the California Public Utilities Commission (PUC) from 2006 to 2009.

== Early life and education ==
Rachelle B. Chong was born on June 22, 1959, in Stockton, California, where she was raised. Chong is the great-grandniece of Hong Yen Chang, an immigrant from modern-day Guangdong, China who became the first Chinese-American attorney. Chong attended Lincoln High School, where she edited the school newspaper.

Chong attended the University of California, Berkeley, where she received dual degrees in political science and journalism. Chong received her J.D. degree from the University of California, Hastings College of the Law.

== Federal Communications Commission (FCC) ==
Chong was appointed in May 1994 by President Bill Clinton to serve on the Federal Communications Commission (FCC). At the time of her appointment, Chong worked as an attorney at San Francisco-based law firm Graham & James, where she specialized in telecommunications law.

At age 35 years, Chong was the youngest member of the commission at the time of her appointment. As a member of the FCC, Chong voted against an inquiry into the impact of liquor advertising on children. Chong argued that if the agency investigated the impact of liquor ads, the FCC would arguably have "an obligation to also investigate car advertising that features air bags and sugared cereal advertising" as well.

=== Renomination effort ===
In 1997, it was reported that Chong was unlikely to be appointed to a second term in office. According to Variety, amid uncertainty about whether she would be re-appointed to the FCC, Chong "took the unusual step of publicly campaigning for reappointment". The effort was reportedly controversial among organizations such as the conservative National Taxpayers Union (NTU), who wrote to Chong that they were "deeply disturbed by reports… that you are asking industry groups to support your nomination". Chong was ultimately not selected for renomination, and was replaced on the FCC by fellow Republican Michael Powell.

== Post-FCC career ==
=== California Public Utilities Commission ===
From 2006 to 2009, Chong was appointed by Governor Arnold Schwarzenegger to the California Public Utilities Commission (PUC). As a member of the PUC, Chong was credited with helping to deregulate most landline services operating in California, a measure supported by AT&T and Verizon. In this capacity, she would return to the FCC in 2008 as a member of the agency's Federal-State Joint Conference on Advanced Services, alongside five other state utilities officials.

The East Bay Times described Chong as "the California Public Utilities Commission member consumer advocates love to hate", and advocacy groups including the Consumer Federation of California mobilized in opposition to her confirmation. In 2009, the California State Senate blocked Chong from being confirmed for a full term in office.

=== Private sector ===
In 2011, Chong was named by Comcast as the company's regional vice president of government affairs for California. In 2020, Chong was named as a member of T-Mobile's 14-member advisory committee on diversity.

== Personal life ==
Chong was married to Kirk Del Prete, a fellow graduate of UC Hastings, until his death in 2015. Chong is the mother of twins.

=== Star Trek ===
As a member of the FCC, Chong was noted for being a devout fan of Star Trek, with her official bio on the FCC website noted that she was a "Trekkie". After taking office in 1995, Chong sported "com badge" featured in the series on her dress. According to the Washington Post, Chong's "passion is watching "Star Trek: The Next Generation," every episode, several times."
