= Harold W. Furchtgott-Roth =

American economist

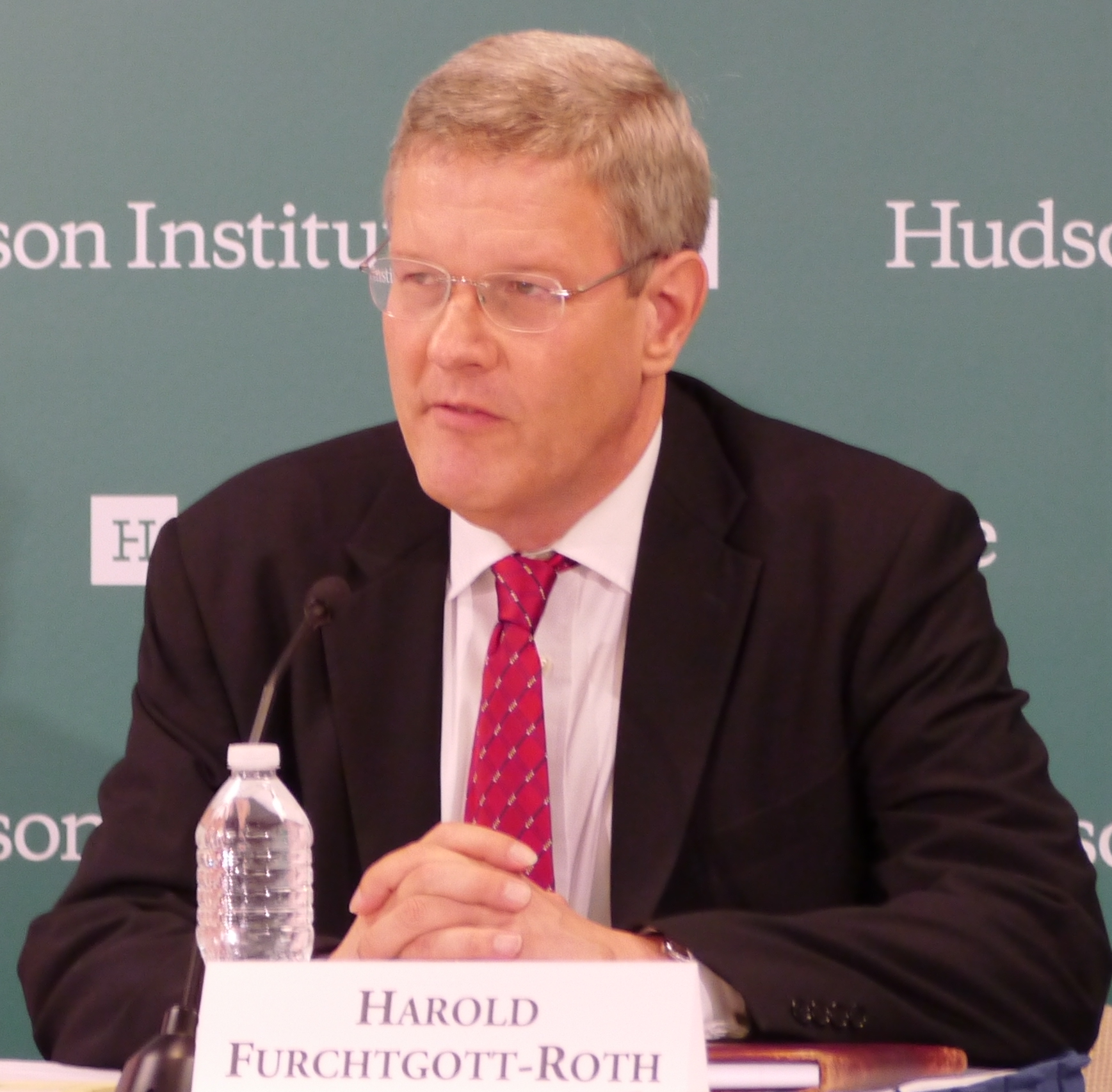
- Furchtgott-Roth at the Hudson Institute in 2015

Commissioner of the Federal Communications Commission
- In office November 3, 1997 – May 30, 2001
- President: Bill Clinton; George W. Bush
- Preceded by: Andrew C. Barrett
- Succeeded by: Kathleen Q. Abernathy

Personal details
- Born: December 13, 1956 (age 69) Knoxville, Tennessee
- Party: Republican

Harold W. Furchtgott-Roth (born December 13, 1956) is an American economist who served as a Commissioner of the Federal Communications Commission from 1997 to 2001.
