= Andrew C. Barrett =

American attorney and a Commissioner of the FCC

Commissioner of the Federal Communications Commission
- In office September 8, 1989 – March 30, 1996
- President: George H. W. Bush; Bill Clinton
- Preceded by: Mark S. Fowler
- Succeeded by: Harold W. Furchtgott-Roth

Personal details
- Born: April 14, 1940 (age 84); Rome, Georgia
- Political party: Republican

Andrew C. Barrett (born April 14, 1940) is an American attorney who served as a Commissioner of the Federal Communications Commission from 1989 to 1996.
