= Olivia Trusty =

American policy analyst (born 1983)

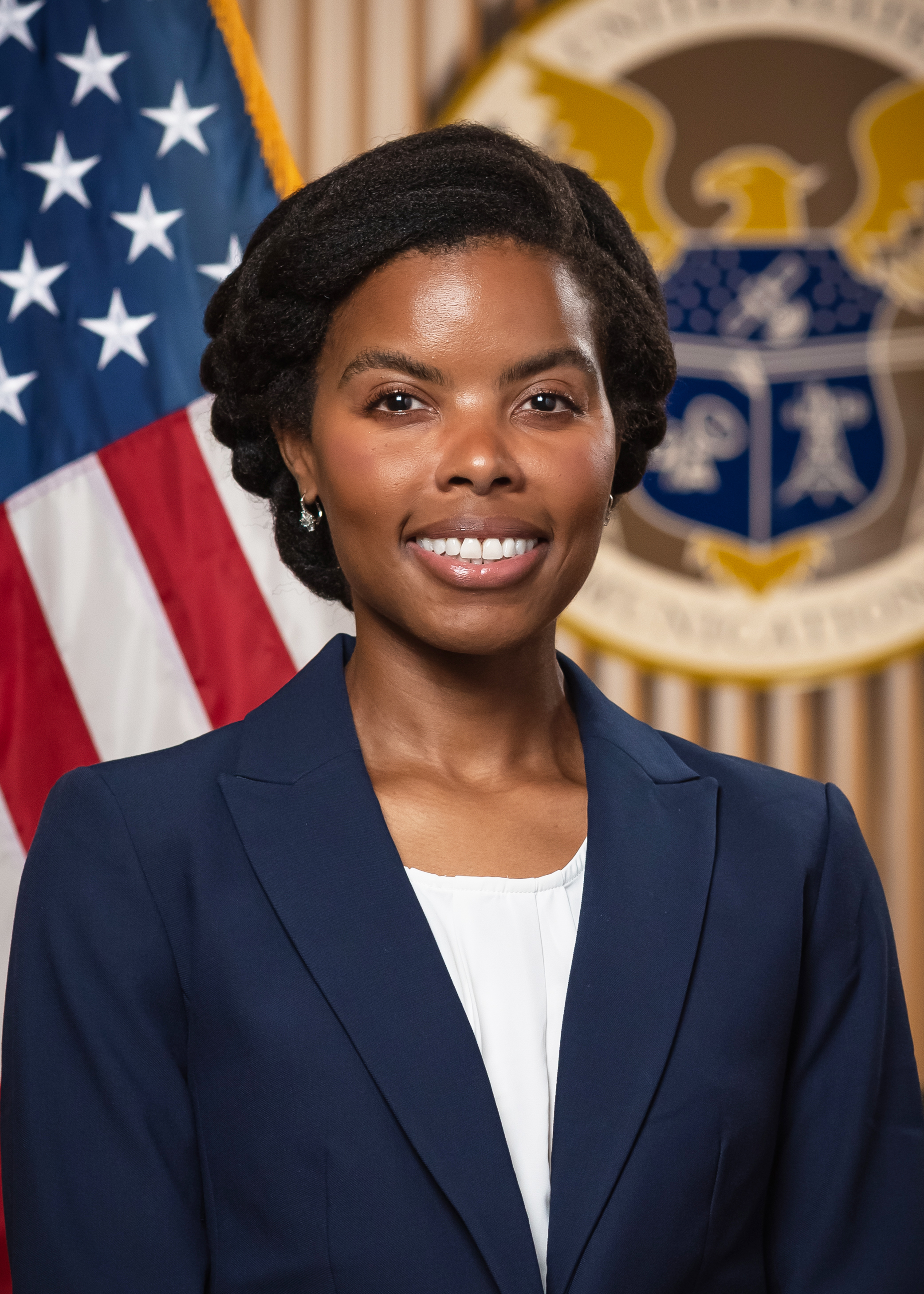
- Official portrait, 2025

Member of the Federal Communications Commission
- Incumbent
- Assumed office June 23, 2025
- President: Donald Trump
- Preceded by: Jessica Rosenworcel

Personal details
- Born: Baltimore, Maryland, U.S.
- Party: Republican
- Education: University of North Carolina at Chapel Hill (BA); Georgetown University (MA)

Olivia Britt Trusty (born September 20, 1983) is an American telecommunications policy analyst. She is a commissioner of the United States Federal Communications Commission.

== Early life and education ==
Trusty is the daughter of Ellen and Terry Trusty. She has five sisters and one brother. Her hometown is Baltimore, Maryland. She was a competitive gymnast and earned her high school diploma at Bryn Mawr School. She received a Bachelors of Arts degree in political science from University of North Carolina at Chapel Hill, graduating in 2005, and a Master of Arts in government from Georgetown University in 2007.

== Career ==
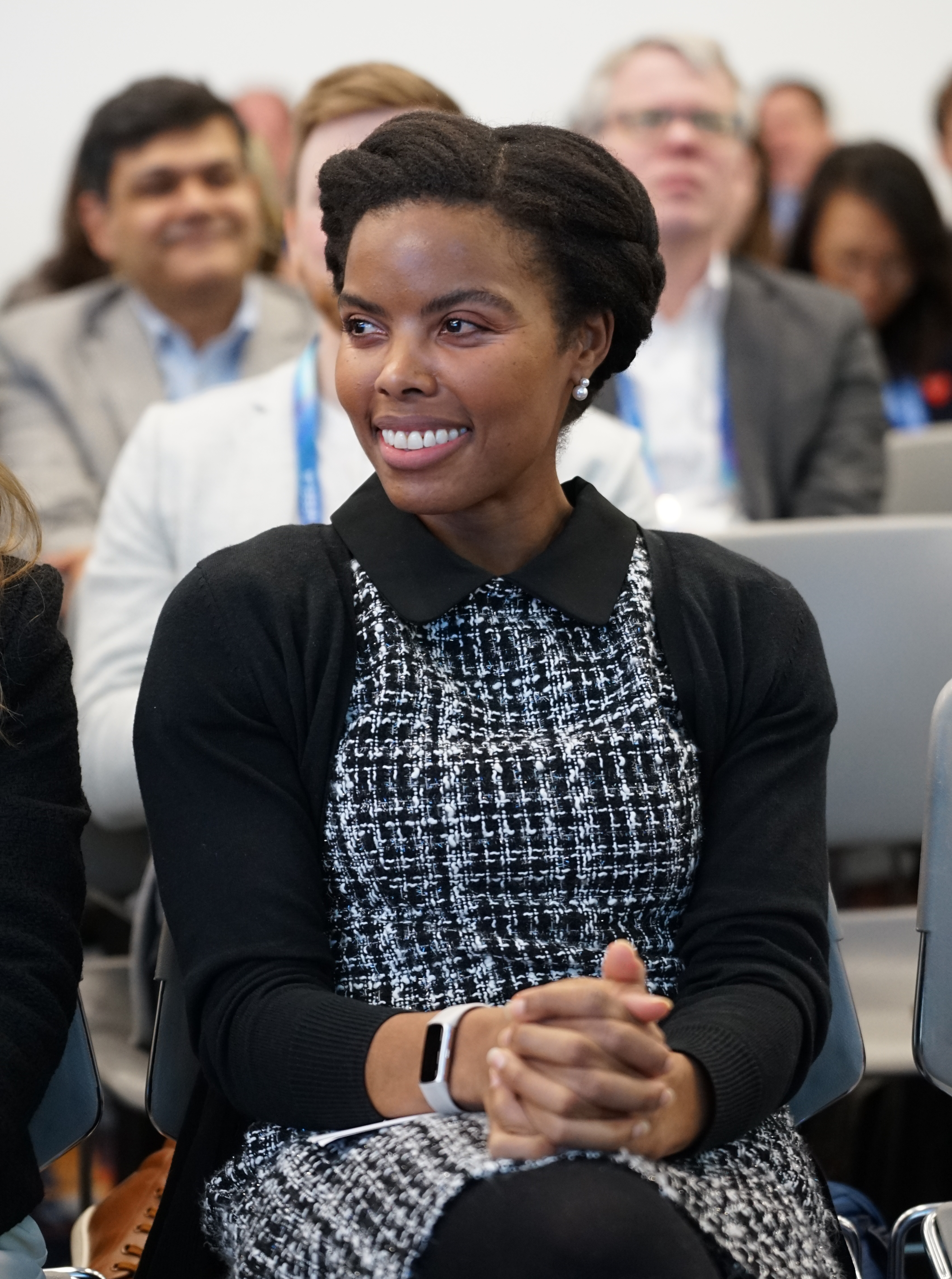
Olivia Trusty at CES 2026

Trusty worked as a Congressional staffer for Republican Sen. Roger Wicker and Rep. Bob Latta. As of January 2025, she was policy director on the Senate Committee on Commerce, Science and Transportation.

In January 2025, Trusty was nominated as a commissioner of the Federal Communications Commission by President Donald Trump. She was confirmed on June 17, 2025 to fill the remaining term of Jessica Rosenworcel which ended June 30, 2025 and also to a full five-year term beginning July 1, 2025 and ending June 30, 2030.
