= Hampson Gary =

American diplomat and military officer (1873–1952)

Commissioner of the Federal Communications Commission
- In office July 11, 1934 – January 1, 1935
- President: Franklin D. Roosevelt
- Preceded by: position established

U.S. Consul General to Egypt
- In office February 7, 1918 – December 7, 1919
- President: Woodrow Wilson
- Preceded by: Olney Arnold
- Succeeded by: Carroll Sprigg

Member of the Texas House of Representatives from the 24th district
- In office January 8, 1901 – January 13, 1903
- Preceded by: James M. Dorroh
- Succeeded by: George B. Griggs

Personal details
- Born: April 23, 1873 Tyler, Texas, U.S.
- Died: April 18, 1952 (aged 78) Palm Beach, Florida, U.S.
- Party: Democratic
- Education: University of Virginia

Hampson Boren Gary (April 23, 1873 – April 18, 1952) was an American diplomat and military officer.

== Biography ==
Gary was born on April 23, 1873, in Tyler, Texas, to Franklin Newman and Martha Isabella (Boren) Gary. In 1886, after their deaths, he was placed under the legal guardianship of Dr. F. M. Hicks. After attending Bingham School in North Carolina and the University of Virginia in 1894, he practiced law in Tyler.

On June 24, 1896, Gary was commissioned a first lieutenant in the Fifth Infantry and was captain of Company K, Fourth Texas Volunteer Infantry Regiment during the Spanish-American War. When the war ended, he served with the Texas National Guard as colonel of the Third Texas Infantry Regiment.

Gary was a member of the Texas House of Representatives, January 8, 1901 – January 13, 1903, and the board of regents of the University of Texas, 1909–10.

Beginning in 1914, he served in various positions within the State Department. In 1919, Gary went to Paris to work with the American Commission to Negotiate Peace, and on April 1, 1920, he was appointed Envoy Extraordinary and Minister Plenipotentiary to Switzerland which was a joint appointment to Liechtenstein by President Wilson. Gary attended the First Assembly of the League of Nations in Geneva as an observer for the United States. Gary served as Agent/Consul General to Egypt from 1918 to 1919.

Gary was also a commissioner for the Federal Communications Commission from July 11, 1934 to January 1, 1935.

Gary died on April 18, 1952, aged 78, in Palm Beach, Florida. He is interred in Arlington National Cemetery.
