= Frieda B. Hennock =

American member of the Federal Communications Commission

Frieda Hennock

Commissioner of the Federal Communications Commission
- In office July 6, 1948 - June 30, 1955
- President: Harry S. Truman; Dwight D. Eisenhower

Personal details
- Born: December 27, 1904; Kovel
- Died: June 20, 1960 (aged 55)
- Political party: Democratic

Frieda Barkin Hennock (December 27, 1904–June 20, 1960) was the first female commissioner of the Federal Communications Commission and a central figure in the creation of an enduring system of educational television in the United States.

Born in Kovel, then in the Russian Empire, now in Ukraine, the youngest of the eight children, she immigrated with her family to New York City in 1910 and became a US citizen in 1916 (in later life, she retained her fluency in Yiddish and continued to pray daily). After graduating from Morris High School (Bronx), she worked as a clerk for New York City law firms to earn tuition for night classes at Brooklyn Law School; there, in 1924, she earned a Bachelor of Laws LL.B (a terminal law degree open to high-school graduates until 1971). She had to reach the minimum age of 21 to be admitted to the New York State Bar Association, but in 1926, at age 22, she became the "youngest woman lawyer practicing in New York City." She practiced law in New York until 1946.

In 1948, President Harry S. Truman nominated her to be a commissioner of the Federal Communications Commission, a position never held before by a woman; she was confirmed by the Senate on July 6. Arguing that "television channels represent one of America’s most valuable resources," Hennock sought to mobilize public support for educational television, writing and speaking widely about the importance of television for education and consulting with the Institute for Education by Radio and the National Association of Educational Broadcasters. In congressional hearings in 1950, educators from the Joint Committee on Educational Television were able to produce studies that countered lobbying from the commercial broadcasting industry arguing that non-commercial stations were unnecessary. When the FCC in March 1951, published a rule supporting reserving channels for education but not specifying their permanence, Hennock "wrote a separate opinion urging that reservations for non-commercial stations should be permanent." That year, President Truman nominated Hennock for a federal judgeship in New York, but opposition caused her to withdraw her name and remain on the FCC; and in April 1952, the FCC's Sixth Report and Order permanently reserved channel assignments in 242 communities for educational stations, thus ensuring the future of public broadcasting in the United States. Paula A. Kerger, the president and CEO of PBS, said in 2016, "She was looking at this emerging medium, recognizing that it could be such a democratizing element of society, but that would never fully be realized if there wasn't some piece of it set aside for noncommercial purposes.". In May 1953, Hennock was invited to inaugurate the first educational television station in the country, KUHT in Houston, Texas.

When Hennock's FCC term ended in 1955, she returned to legal practice. She married in 1956. She died of a brain tumor in 1960.
