= George Henry Payne =

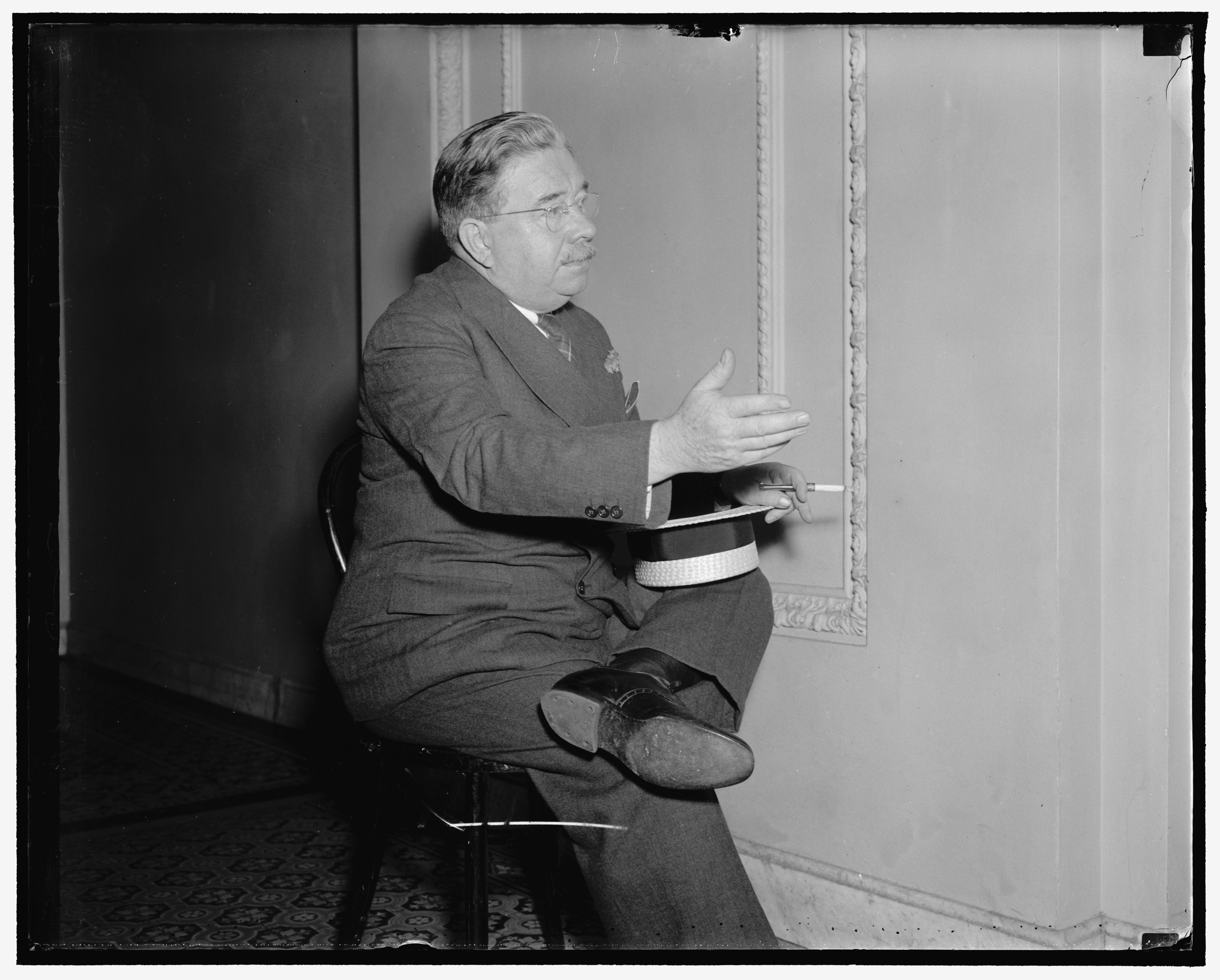

Commissioner of the Federal Communications Commission
- In office July 11, 1934 - June 30, 1943
- President: Franklin D. Roosevelt
- Preceded by: position established

Personal details
- Born: July 13, 1876 New York City
- Died: March 3, 1945 (aged 68) Hollis, New York
- Party: Republican
- Education: City College of New York; New York Law School

George Henry Payne (August 13, 1876 - March 3, 1945) was an author and publisher. He was the campaign manager for Theodore Roosevelt in the United States presidential election of 1912.

== Biography ==
He was born on August 13, 1876, in New York City to George Cooley Payne and Katherine Milligan. He attended City College of New York and then attended New York Law School in 1895.

Payne acted as campaign manager for Theodore Roosevelt in the presidential election of 1912. He was a member of the Federal Communications Commission from July 11, 1934 - June 30, 1943.

He died on March 3, 1945, in Hollis, New York.

=== Works ===
- A Great Part, and Other Stories of the Stage, 1901
- The Birth of the New Party, 1912
- History of the Child in Human Progress, 1915
- History of Journalism in America, 1919
- England-Her Treatment of America, 1931
- The Fourth Estate and Radio, 1936
