= Michael O'Rielly =

U.S. Federal Communications Commissioner

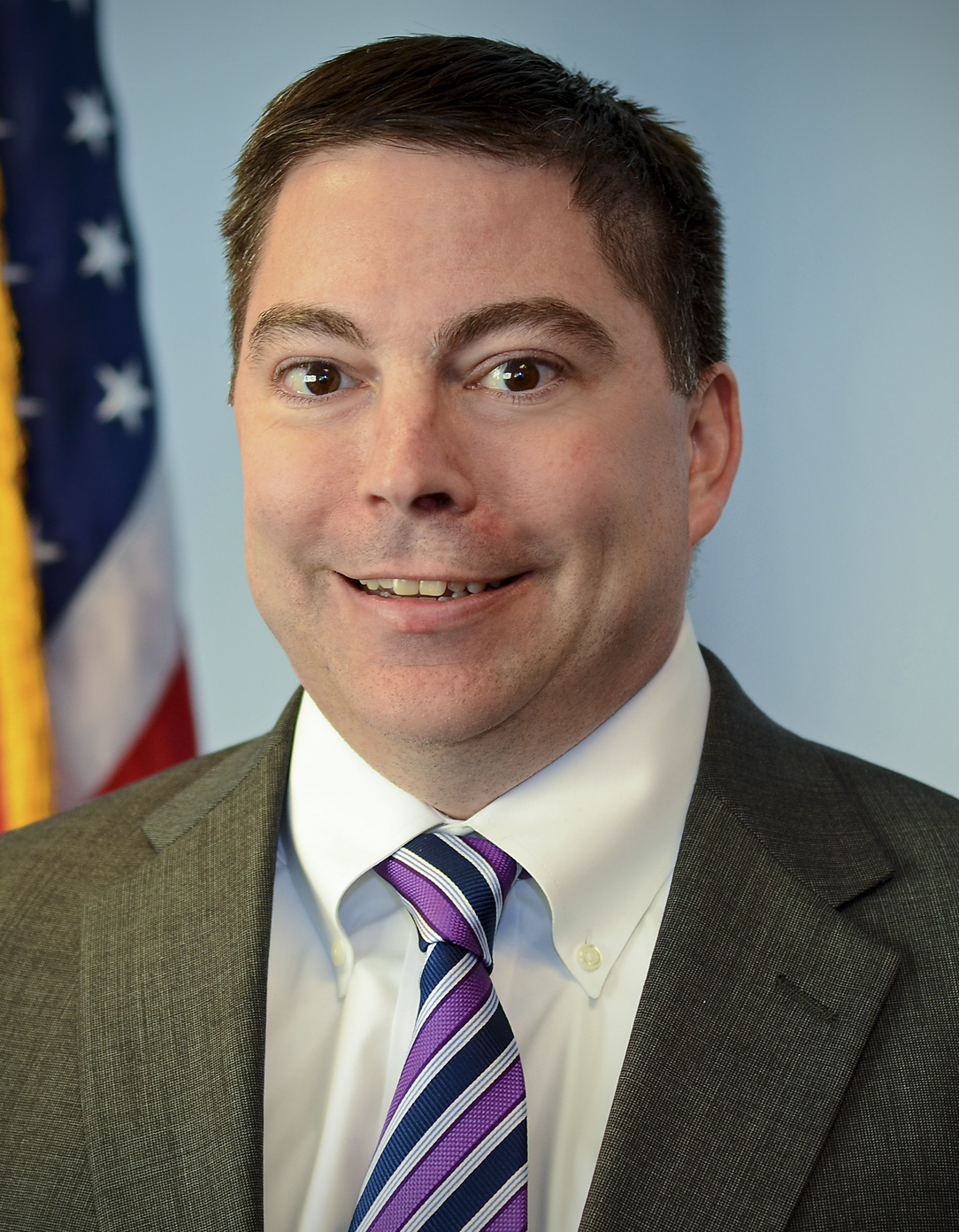

Commissioner of the Federal Communications Commission
- In office November 4, 2013 – December 14, 2020
- President: Barack Obama; Donald Trump
- Preceded by: Robert M. McDowell
- Succeeded by: Nathan Simington

Personal details
- Born: Lockport, New York
- Party: Republican
- Education: University of Rochester
- Website: FCC biography

Michael O'Rielly is a former commissioner of the U.S. Federal Communications Commission (FCC), an independent agency of the United States government. He was nominated by President Barack Obama in August 2013 and was confirmed on October 29, 2013, taking office on November 4, 2013. He was nominated to complete the term of outgoing commissioner Robert M. McDowell which ended on June 30, 2014. He was then renominated and reconfirmed by the Senate.

On August 3, 2020, the White House announced that President Trump was withdrawing O'Rielly's nomination to another term after Senate Armed Services Committee chairman Jim Inhofe said he would put a hold on the nomination and after O'Rielly expressed reservations about the FCC's authority to limit social media companies' legal protections.

== Education ==
Commissioner O'Rielly received his B.A. from the University of Rochester.

== Career ==
O'Rielly began his career as a Legislative Assistant to U.S. Congressman Tom Bliley from 1994 to 1995. He then served as a Professional Staff Member on the Committee on Energy and Commerce in the United States House of Representatives from 1998 to 2003, and Telecommunications Policy Analyst from 1995 to 1998.

From 2003 to 2009, O'Rielly worked in the office of U.S. Senator John E. Sununu, where he served as the Senior Legislative Assistant and later the Legislative Director. From 2009 to 2010, O'Rielly worked for the Republican Policy Committee in the U.S. Senate as a Policy Analyst for Banking, Technology, Transportation, Trade, and Commerce issues. From 2010 to 2013, O'Rielly worked in the office of the Senate Republican Whip as a policy advisor for U.S. Senator John Cornyn, and as a policy advisor, Deputy Chief of Staff, and Policy Director for U.S. Senator Jon Kyl.

== Policy ==
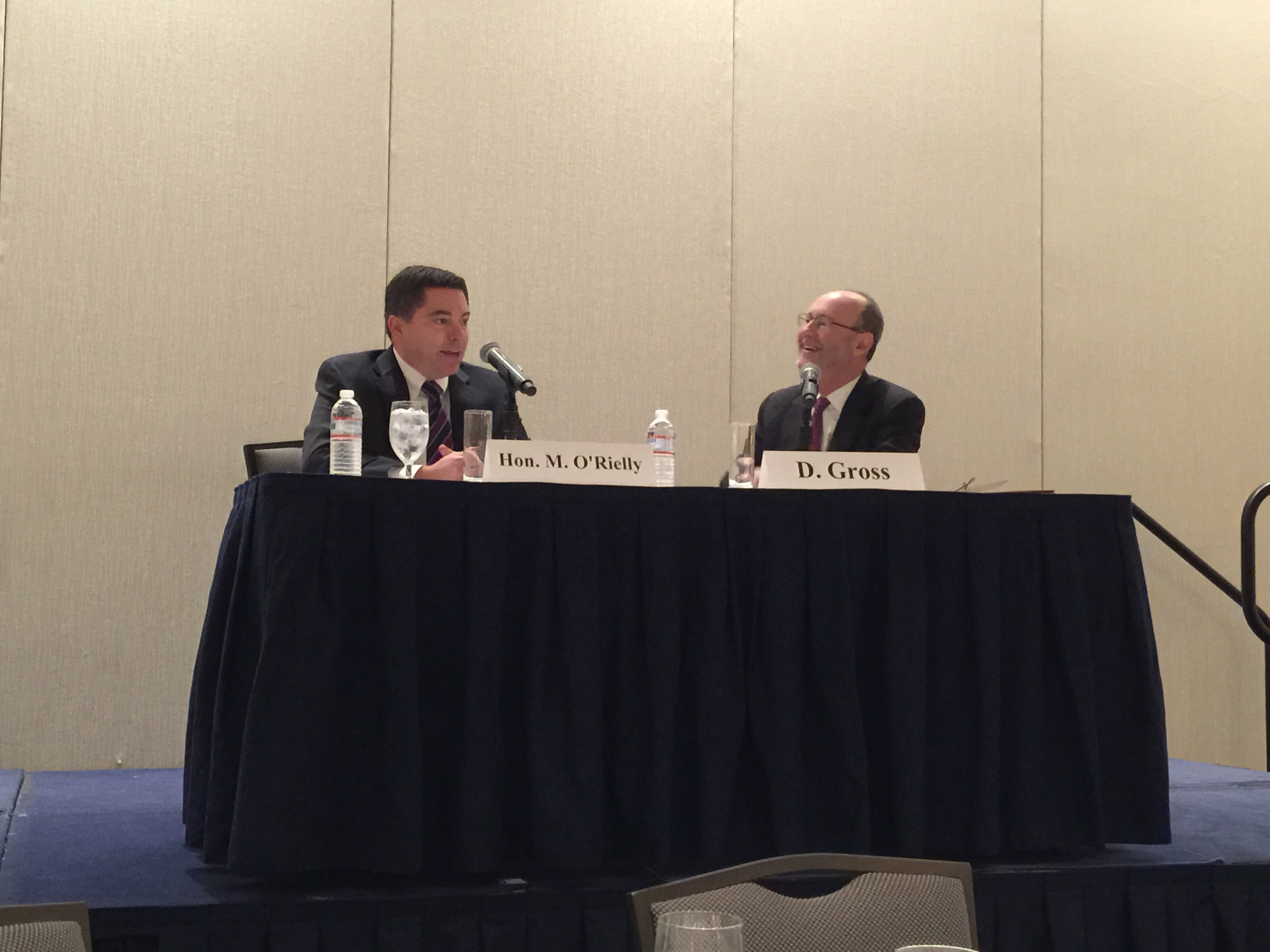
Commissioner O'Rielly speaking at the 32nd Annual Institute on Telecommunications Policy & Regulation presented by PLI/FCBA

During his term as FCC Commissioner, O'Rielly voted against a proposal that would reclassify Internet service providers as Title II Common Carriers and impose net neutrality rules, a proposal that would overturn state laws that prevent Internet service providers from competition from municipal broadband providers, a proposal to change the technical definition of "broadband Internet" from at least 4 Mbps to at least 25 Mbps, a proposal to use the LifeLine phone service subsidy program to subsidize broadband access to poor people, and a 2015 ruling that expanded consumer protections against Robodialers.

Internet access is not a necessity in the day-to-day lives of Americans and doesn't even come close to the threshold to be considered a basic human right... People do a disservice by overstating its relevancy or stature in people's lives. People can and do live without Internet access, and many lead very successful lives.

— Michael O'Rielly, June 25, 2015, Slate

O'Rielly had reportedly expressed to Trump that he "had deep reservations" about the President's attempt to use his executive powers to order the FCC to limit the ability of online platforms to determine what they allowed on their platform, specifically his request that Section 230 legal protections be withdrawn from platforms that label or remove content shared by users which was deemed misleading, or otherwise violated their terms of service. The White House had drafted the Executive Order in May, after Twitter had applied fact-checking labels to two of the President's tweets where he alleged widespread voter fraud by the Democratic Party.

O'Rielly later clarified his position in a speech, stating, "the First Amendment protects us from limits on speech imposed by the government—not private actors—and we should all reject demands, in the name of the First Amendment, for private actors to curate or publish speech in a certain way. Like it or not, the First Amendment's protections apply to corporate entities..." Five days after the speech, without offering any additional information or a documented reason, Trump announced that he rescinded O'Rielly's nomination. O'Rielly's tenure had officially expired in 2019, though he was permitted to serve through the end of 2020, or be reconfirmed for the position for another five years. Trump chose to instead nominate Simington, who shared Trump's views on the matter. As a lawyer for the Commerce Department, Simington had helped write the petition to the FCC, which asked them to enforce Trump's executive order, and limit the legal protections of those online platforms which the White House deemed to be limiting the speech of conservative figures, even though such limitation on purely political speech has always been anecdotal.
