= Nathan Simington =

FCC commissioner

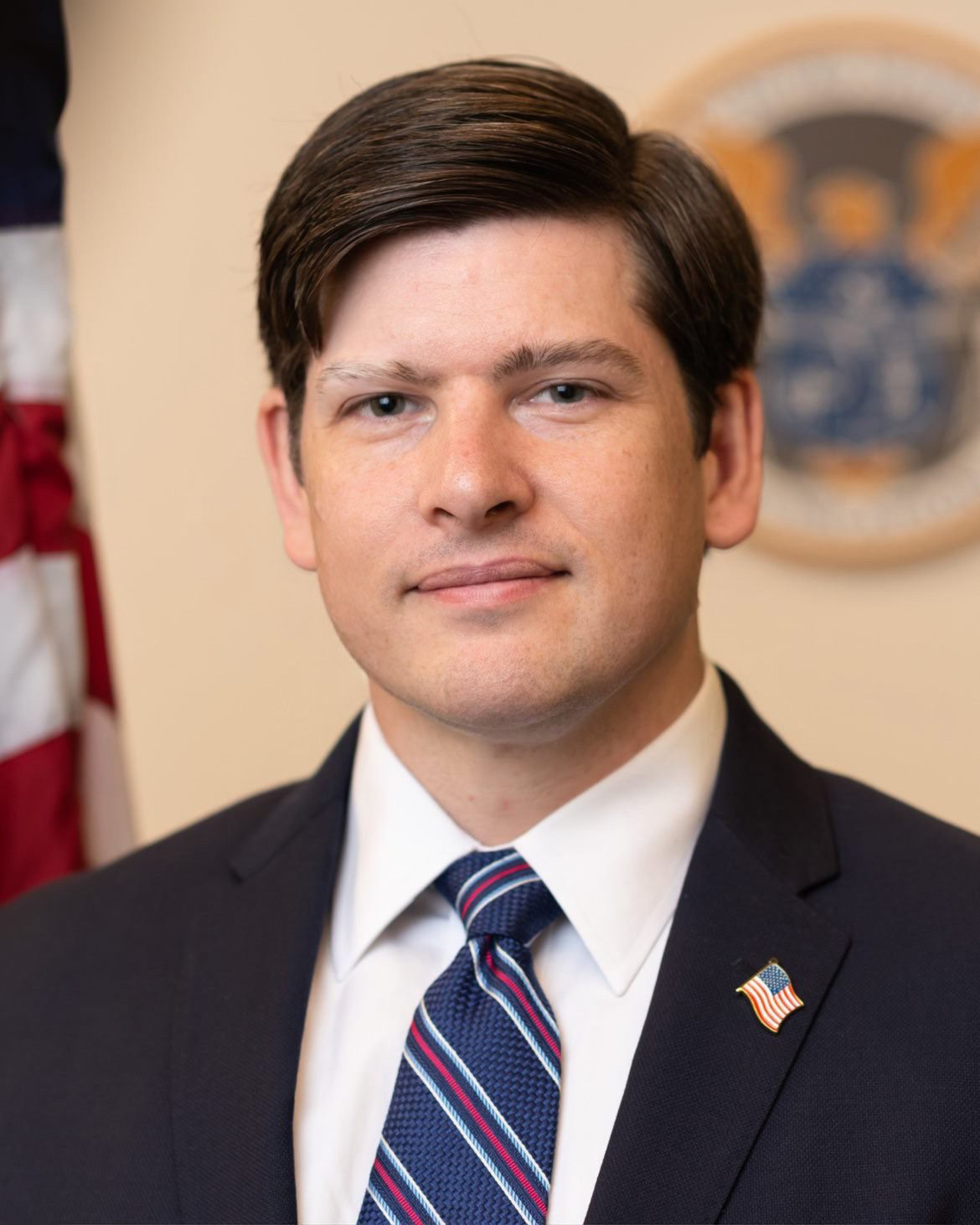

Commissioner of the Federal Communications Commission
- In office December 14, 2020 – June 6, 2025
- President: Donald Trump; Joe Biden; Donald Trump
- Preceded by: Michael O'Rielly
- Succeeded by: Vacant

Personal details
- Born: Nathan Alexander Simington; January 31, 1979 (age 47) Saskatoon, Canada
- Spouse: Larisa Loredana
- Education: Lawrence University (BM); University of Rochester (MM, MA); University of Michigan (JD)

Nathan Alexander Simington (born January 31, 1979) is a former commissioner of the U.S. Federal Communications Commission (FCC). Simington previously served as a senior advisor at the National Telecommunications and Information Administration. Prior to that, he had worked as an associate at Mayer Brown, Kirkland & Ellis, and Chapman and Cutler, and as legal counsel at Brightstar Corporation.

== Early life and education ==
Simington grew up in the Canadian province of Saskatchewan and is a naturalized U.S. citizen.

Simington grew up in a rural part of the province. His family were homesteaders in Saskatchewan in the early 1900s. He has said that radio played an important role in his life because growing up he had very few television channels to watch and the radio was "always on."

Simington received a Bachelor of Music in violin performance at Lawrence University, earned a Master of Music in violin performance and a Master of Arts in music theory from the Eastman School of Music at the University of Rochester, and was awarded a Juris Doctor from the University of Michigan Law School.

== Career ==
=== Commerce Department and FCC ===
After working at Brightstar Corporation, Simington served in the Department of Commerce for five months, until President Trump announced the nomination of Simington as an FCC commissioner, shortly after Senate Armed Services Committee chairman Jim Inhofe cancelled the second confirmation hearing before the United States Senate for the acting commissioner, Michael O'Rielly.

Nominated in September, Simington's Senate approval was fast-tracked, with a confirmation hearing expected to be held before the end of December. In October, Trump urged an expedited process, tweeting, “Republicans need to get smart and confirm Nate Simington to the FCC ASAP!” The confirmation hearing was scheduled for November 10, considered near-record time, shortly after the 2020 United States elections. The day before his confirmation hearing, President Trump tweeted that he "wanted action NOW on this very important confirmation hearing!" He underwent his first confirmation hearing before the Senate Committee on Commerce, Science, and Transportation on November 10, 2020. According to Bloomberg Law, he was met with a generally mixed response, including only "lukewarm support" from Republican members, casting doubts as to whether he could be confirmed before President-Elect Joseph Biden would assume office. On December 8, 2020, the full United States Senate confirmed his nomination by a 49–46 vote. Simington assumed office on December 14, 2020. He resigned from the commission in June 2025.
