= Robert T. Bartley =

American administrator

Commissioner of the Federal Communications Commission
- In office March 6, 1952 – June 30, 1972
- President: Harry S. Truman; Dwight D. Eisenhower; John F. Kennedy; Lyndon B. Johnson; Richard Nixon
- Preceded by: Wayne Coy
- Succeeded by: Benjamin Hooks

Personal details
- Born: May 20, 1909; Ladonia, Texas
- Died: January 8, 1988 (aged 78); Washington, D.C.
- Political party: Democratic

Robert T. Bartley (May 20, 1909 – January 8, 1988) was an American administrator who served as a Commissioner of the Federal Communications Commission from 1952 to 1972.

He died on January 8, 1988, in Washington, D.C. at age 78.
