= Kathleen Q. Abernathy =

American lawyer

Kathleen Quinn Abernathy
- Born: 1956 (age 69–70); Louisville, Kentucky, United States
- Education: Marquette University; The Catholic University of America Columbus School of Law
- Occupation: Telecommunications technology executive
- Employer: Frontier Communications
- Title: Executive Vice President of External Affairs
- Board member of: Federal Communications Commission

Kathleen Quinn Abernathy (born 1956) is an American telecommunications technology executive and lawyer who served as a Commissioner of the Federal Communications Commission (FCC) from 2001 to 2005. Following government service, she joined the board of Frontier Communications while also returning to the practice of law. In 2010, she became a senior executive at Frontier and she served variously as Chief Legal Officer, Executive Vice President of External Affairs and Chair, America's Best Communities Prize Competition. In 2012, she joined the board of ISO New England, a regional energy transmission organization. She graduated from Marquette University magna cum laude, and from Catholic University's Columbus School of Law. She also served as an adjunct professor of law at Georgetown University and Catholic University's Columbus School of Law.

== Early career ==
Prior to her appointment to the Federal Communications Commission, Abernathy was Vice President of Public Policy at BroadBand Office Communications; a partner at the law firm of Wilkinson Barker Knauer LLP; Vice President for Regulatory Affairs at U S WEST; and Vice President for Federal Regulatory Affairs at AirTouch. Earlier in her career, she was a Legal Advisor to FCC Chairman James H. Quello, Legal Advisor to Commissioner Sherrie P. Marshall, and Special Assistant to the FCC General Counsel.

== FCC appointment ==
Abernathy was nominated to the FCC by President George W. Bush on May 1, 2001. She was sworn on May 31, 2001, and served until December 9, 2005. During her tenure, Abernathy chaired the Federal-State Joint Board on Universal Service and participated in numerous international bilateral and multilateral negotiations, including the 2002 ITU Plenipotentiary Conference and the 2003 ITU World Radiocommunications Conference. She also was appointed and served as Chair of the 2004 ITU Global Symposium for Regulators.

== Family ==
Abernathy is married and has one daughter.
