= Sherrie P. Marshall =

American attorney

Commissioner of the Federal Communications Commission
- In office August 21, 1989 – April 30, 1993
- President: George H. W. Bush; Bill Clinton
- Preceded by: Dennis R. Patrick
- Succeeded by: Rachelle B. Chong

Personal details
- Born: August 3, 1953 (age 72) Jacksonville, Florida
- Party: Republican

Sherrie Patrice Marshall (born August 3, 1953) is an American attorney who served as a Commissioner of the Federal Communications Commission from 1989 to 1993. A member of the Republican Party, Marshall was formerly an attorney at Wiley, Rein, & Felding, and served under President Ronald Reagan as assistant White House Counsel.
