= Eugene H. Merrill (politician) =

American politician

Eugene Hyde Merrill

Commissioner of the Federal Communications Commission
- In office October 6, 1952 - April 15, 1953
- President: Harry S. Truman; Dwight D. Eisenhower

Personal details
- Born: June 25, 1908 Salt Lake City, Utah U.S.A.
- Died: January 4, 1973 (aged 64)
- Education: University of Utah
- Occupation: Deputy Assistant Secretary / consultant / commissioner chief engineer administrator / manager

Eugene Hyde Merrill (June 25, 1908 – January 4, 1973) served as a commissioner of the Federal Communications Commission from 1952-1953 at the end of the Truman administration. Merrill was from Utah and was a Latter-day Saint.

Merrill was born in Salt Lake City. From 1928-1930 he served a mission for the Church of Jesus Christ of Latter-day Saints in North Carolina. He studied Mining Engineering at the University of Utah where he earned his B.S. degree in 1932.

In 1935 Merrill was appointed the chief engineer of the Public Service Commission of Utah. He served in that position until 1941. In 1939-1940 Merrill served as president of the National Conference of Public Utilities. In 1941 Merrill was appointed an administrator of the War Production Board.

From 1945-1950 Merrill served as a manager of the German Communications Agency which operated in US occupied Germany. He then served as an administrator of the United States Department of Commerce until his appointment as a commissioner of the FCC. From 1953-1961 Merrill worked as a consultant for NATO. He was then Deputy Assistant Secretary of the United States Army from 1961-1966.

== Sources ==
- political graveyard entry for Merrill
- Michael K. Winder. President's and Prophets: The Story of America's Presidents and the LDS Church. (American Fork, Utah: Covenant Communications, 2007) p. 269.
- University of Utah bio of Merrill
