= FCC Record =

Gazette of the Federal Communications Commission

- Type: Biweekly government gazette
- Publisher: Government Printing Office
- OCLC number: 14964165
- Free online archives: digital.library.unt.edu/explore/collections/FCCRD/

The FCC Record, also known as the Federal Communications Commission Record and variously abbreviated as FCC Rcd. and F.C.C.R., is the comprehensive compilation of decisions, reports, public notices, and other documents of the Federal Communications Commission (FCC), published since 1986. It is a biweekly pamphlet available from the Government Printing Office Superintendent of Documents. Citations should provide the volume, page number and year, in that order, e.g., 1 FCC Rcd. 1 (1986). The FCC Record was preceded by the FCC Reports, which covered the years 1934–1986.

== See also ==
- Federal Register
