= Charles R. Denny =

Charles Denny

Chairman of the Federal Communications Commission
- In office February 26, 1946 – October 31, 1947
- President: Harry S. Truman
- Preceded by: Paul A. Porter
- Succeeded by: Paul A. Walker

Personal details
- Born: Charles Ruthven Denny Jr. April 11, 1912 Baltimore, Maryland
- Died: October 30, 2000 (aged 88)
- Party: Democratic
- Spouse: Elizabeth Woolsey
- Children: Alison Denny; Christine Denny; Charles Denny
- Education: Amherst College; Harvard Law School
- Profession: Lawyer

Charles Ruthven Denny Jr. (April 11, 1912 – October 30, 2000) was general counsel of the United States Federal Communications Commission, then a member of the commission itself, and was later its chairman. He was married and had three children, and he was a member of the Episcopal Church.

== Life ==
The son and grandson of wallpaper wholesalers, Denny was born in Baltimore, Maryland, and grew up in Washington, D.C. He attended the Washington public schools, graduating from Western High School in 1929. He attended Amherst College, receiving an A.B. in 1933, and then Harvard Law School, from which he graduated in 1936. After law school, Denny joined a Washington law firm, Covington, Burling, Rublee, Acheson & Shorb, but left after less than a year to join the United States Department of Justice in the Lands Division. He married Elizabeth Woolsey on December 31, 1937; the couple had three children: Alison, Christine, and Charles. Denny joined the FCC as assistant general counsel in February 1942, and was promoted to general counsel the following October, replacing Telford Taylor.

Denny was nominated to the FCC by President Franklin D. Roosevelt on March 14, 1945, to replace T.A.M. Craven, whose seat had been open since his term expired the previous June. At 32 years of age, Denny was the youngest person to be appointed to the FCC since its establishment in 1934. He was confirmed in the United States Senate by unanimous consent on March 26, and took office March 30. Denny was succeeded as general counsel by assistant general counsel for broadcasting Rosel H. Hyde.

Denny was designated acting FCC chairman on February 26, 1946, after chairman Paul A. Porter was appointed administrator of the Office of Price Administration; Denny was designated permanent chairman on December 4, 1946. He left the FCC on October 31, 1947, and was succeeded as chairman on an interim basis by commissioner Paul A. Walker. Wayne Coy was appointed to the remainder of Denny's term, and was designated chairman when he took office. On leaving the commission, Denny took a position as general counsel of NBC; he later rose to executive vice-president of parent company RCA. He remained with RCA for 28 years before retiring at the end of 1975.

Denny died on October 30, 2000, at age 88.

Government offices
Preceded by Paul A. Porter	Chairman of the Federal Communications Commission; 1946–1947	Succeeded by Paul A. Walker
Preceded by T.A.M. Craven	Member of the Federal Communications Commission; 1945–1947	Succeeded by Wayne Coy
