= Hamilton Robinson =

Hamilton Robinson (c. 1908–1984) was a 20th-century civil servant, best known as director of the State Department's Office of Controls (which included its departmental loyalty board), for which he was attacked as a "security risk" by U.S. Representative Fred E. Busbey (Illinois's 3rd district).

== Background ==
Hamilton Robinson was born around 1908 in New Haven, Connecticut. He attended the Taft School. He graduated from Princeton University. He studied for a year at Oxford University. Then, he obtained a law degree at Yale University.

== Career ==
Robinson began his career in private practice in the law firm of Sullivan & Cromwell and became a partner of future Secretary of State John Foster Dulles.

=== Public service ===
In 1940, Robinson moved to Washington to become legal counsel to the British Purchasing Commission. Then, he worked for the deputy administrator of the Lend-Lease Program. He went on active duty in the U.S. Army and served on the staff of Gen. Brehon Somervell, commander of the Army Service Forces. From 1942 to 1946, he had worked with John Foster Dulles at Sullivan & Cromwell. "In less than four years in the Army, from 1942 to 1946, he had risen from first lieutenant to lieutenant colonel. He had glowing recommendations as an administrator."

In 1946, having left military service as an Army colonel, he joined the State Department as director of the Office of Economic Security Policy. Soon after, he became director of the Office of Controls, responsible for the department's internal security. By 1947, he had also become chairman of the Security Advisory Board of the State, War and Navy Department Coordinating Committee. Robinson had wide responsibility at this point: "With 782 employees, Controls was a grab bag of six unconnected divisions including munitions, visa and passport, and security."

=== Loyalty, Lee List, and anti-communism ===
Robinson came under intense pressure from Republicans for "lenience," while Democrats objected to his over-strict security guidelines across all government agencies (civilian and military).

On March 21, 1947, President Truman's Executive Order 9835 established departmental review boards to remove from government service or to deny employment to persons if "reasonable grounds exist for belief that the person involved is disloyal to the United States." Also in 1947, Assistant Secretary of State John E. Peurifoy asked the FBI to conduct an audit of the State Department's Division of Security and Investigations, which found them "lacking in thoroughness."

In June 1947, the State Department dismissed ten (10) employees–"none of them of top policy-making rank"–on unspecified grounds of disloyalty, as reported by Joseph Alsop and Stewart Alsop. On November 2, 1947, Bert Andrews published "A State Department Security Case" in the Herald-Tribune based on security a secret transcripts. Robinson's name appeared prominently. Andrews described "Mr. Blank," an unnamed State Department official among those discharged without specific charges. Articles continued for some days almost daily by Andrews. The Washington Post reacted the next day with concern: "Without access to what the FBI reported, there is no way of knowing whether Mr. Blank was a doubtful security risk." In a comment, New Yorker magazine compared Mr. Blank's story to Franz Kafka's book The Trial. It also singled out Robinson: "Hamilton Robinson, a member of the panel, explained the difference between loyalty and security. 'I think loyalty,' he said, must necessarily be a conscious proposition. Security or the lack of it, might be conscious or unconscious'." In an article co-written by Yale Law School professor Thomas I. Emerson, its journal questioned the propriety of the story by noting: "The courts have never tolerated the failure to produce in open hearing any part of the evidence upon which the deciding official relies in an administrative adjudication requiring a fair hearing" and cited a decision by the U.S. Supreme Court. On November 17, 1947, the State Department reversed its policy. It authorized the seven resignations "without prejudice" and offered right to appeal before a Loyalty Review Board.

Meanwhile, congressional investigator Robert E. Lee discovered and examined security files for 108 suspect cases, which resulted in the "Lee List" used by a congressional subcommittee. During a congressional hearing on March 10, 1948, Assistant Secretary of State Peurifoy claimed the number had dropped from 108 to 57.

(On February 9, 1950, McCarthy gave a Lincoln Day "Enemies Within" speech to the Republican Women's Club of Wheeling, West Virginia. His words in the speech are a matter of some debate, as no audio recording was saved. However, it is generally agreed that he produced a piece of paper that he claimed contained a list of known Communists working for the State Department. McCarthy is usually quoted to have said: "The State Department is infested with communists. I have here in my hand a list of 205—a list of names that were made known to the Secretary of State as being members of the Communist Party and who nevertheless are still working and shaping policy in the State Department." There is some dispute about whether or not McCarthy actually gave the number of people on the list as being "205" or "57". In a later telegram to President Truman, and when entering the speech into the Congressional Record, he used the number "57.")

On March 10, 1948, Robinson testified before the Chenoweth committee about his association with Robert Talbot Miller III, No. 12 on the Lee List. Miller had been best man at Robinson's wedding. (Later that year, coincidentally, Elizabeth Bentley would name Miller as one of her sources for intelligence gathered for the Soviets.)

On March 13, 1948, President Truman ordered all federal departments to withhold personnel security and loyalty files from Congress.

On March 25, 1948, Representative Fred E. Busbey questioned Robinson's competence and loyalty during a public hearing. He called Robinson "incompetent." He related the fact that "a second cousin of his had gone to Moscow in 1934 and studied Russian." Assistant Secretary of State Peurifoy enabled this line of query by allowing the Busbey to see the Federal Bureau of Investigation file on Robinson (against the orders of President Truman). Adding to the controversy was a refusal only days before by U.S. Secretary of Commerce W. Averell Harriman to turn over loyalty files of NIST chief Edward Condon to the U.S. Senate Atomic Energy Committee. The Washington Post pilloried Busbey's accusation: "Busbey's tenuous" indictment of the State Department's premier purification expert as a security risk because he has a suspect second cousin could be dismissed as a rather healthy reduction to absurdity of the whole loyalty extravaganza if it did not entail an issue of vital principle.

=== Later life ===
In 1948, Robinson became vice president and treasurer of the Foreign Service Educational Foundation, which supported the School of Advanced International Studies (now part of the Johns Hopkins University; he served in this capacity until 1952. In 1962, he joined the investment banking firm of Alex Brown & Sons.

== Personal and death ==
Robinson first married Elizabeth Case, who died in 1940; they had three children. He then married Nancy B. Robinson; they had three children.

Robinson died age 76 on October 12, 1986, following a heart attack at his home in Washington.

== See also ==
- Robert E. Lee (FCC)
- Bert Andrews (journalist)
- Fred E. Busbey
- John E. Peurifoy
- Sullivan & Cromwell
- John Foster Dulles

== External source ==
- History of the Bureau of Diplomatic Security of the United States Department of State (PDF). United States Department of State. October 2011. pp. 79 (powers), 81, 87, 89–90, 124.
