= FCC Network Study Committee =

Advisory committee of the Federal Communications Commission

On July 20, 1955, the Federal Communications Commission (FCC) established the FCC Network Study Committee. It was composed of George C. McConnaughey, chairman, and Commissioners Rosel H. Hyde, Robert T. Bartley. and John C. Doerfer. The goal of the committee was to pursue provisions similar to that of section 5(d) of the Communications Act of 1934, and carry on such study with the same powers and jurisdiction conferred by law upon the commission as provided by that act.

== The Report of the FCC Network Study Staff ==
The study was made to determine whether the contemporary operation of television networks and their relationships with stations and other components of the industry tended to foster or impede the development of a nationwide, competitive broadcasting system. The information from the study can be found in the FCC report titled Network Broadcasting, Report of The Network Study Staff to The Network Study Committee. The report was submitted on October 3, 1957, to the Network Study Committee of Commissioners. Public hearings eventually arose from matters contained in the report starting on March 3, 1958.

No comprehensive study of television broadcasting, for purposes of determining the efficacy of the commission's rules in achieving legislative and commission policy, had been made. The Chain Broadcasting Rules resulting from a study on radio broadcasting from 1938 to 1941, were applied to television without any changes, although there were big differences between the two media. Radio employed sound alone, while television used sight, sound, and motion. The number of radio stations over television stations, the scarcity of television outlets, high cost of television programming, and the fact that television stations were more dependent on networks for programming than radio made a study of the new medium important.

The study was undertaken by a staff of professional personnel recruited from government, industry and universities. It was to accept the network system of broadcasting, supported by advertising; to determine whether and to what extent the existing practices under that system obstruct the effectuation of legislative and Commission policies; and to recommend the minimum changes necessary to attain optimal broadcasting performance in the public interest under the existing broadcasting system. The Committee found that the best way to find this information would be by the use of a "study" technique. The technique included the following steps: a series of conferences with each component of the industry, at which the component made a presentation before the entire staff, explaining its functions and the problems in the industry as seen from the point of view of agencies, national representatives of stations, independent program producers and distributors, and networks; a substantial spot-check of the networks' files; preparation and submission of extensive questionnaires to television networks, all commercial stations, 60 advertising agencies, 34 national representatives of stations, and all independent program producers and distributors.

The study focused on certain key ideas. The report begins with a brief history of the development of television and descriptions of industry components. This was to help aid in understanding the problems which the report considered. These problems included public interest, network concentration of control, affiliation, option time, rates, compensation, "must buy" practices, and multiple ownership. These problems were accessed and formed into an application of Rules to Networks.

== Conclusion of the report ==
The report concluded that the network system was a necessary and highly desirable component of the American broadcasting system. The system served the public interest through public-service programming, popular entertainment, and simultaneous broadcast to a nationwide audience. Not all practices were found to be in the public's interest, however. The Network Study Staff chose to work within the framework of the existing network system and recommend minimum changes, such as removing competitive restraints and adding more diversity of ownership and control.
