= Charles Ferris =

Charles Ferris may refer to:

- Charles G. Ferris (1796–1848), U.S. Representative from New York
- Charles D. Ferris (1933–2024), Chairman of the Federal Communications Commission
