= Jack Jett =

Jack Jett could refer to:

- Jack E. Jett (1956–2015), American talk show host
- Ewell Kirk "Jack" Jett (1893–1965), American radio engineer and FCC Commissioner
