= Frederick W. Ford =

American politician (1909–1986)

Frederick Ford

Chairman of the Federal Communications Commission
- In office March 15, 1960 – March 1, 1961
- President: Dwight D. Eisenhower; John F. Kennedy
- Preceded by: George McConnaughey
- Succeeded by: Newton Minow

Personal details
- Born: September 17, 1909 Bluefield, West Virginia, U.S.
- Died: July 26, 1986 (aged 76)
- Party: Republican
- Education: West Virginia University

Frederick W. Ford (September 17, 1909 – July 26, 1986) was born in Bluefield, West Virginia. He graduated from West Virginia University, where he studied law. A Republican, he was appointed to the Federal Communications Commission in 1957, and after the chairman, John C. Doerfer, was forced to resign after allegations of conflict of interest, President Dwight D. Eisenhower named him to take over as Chairman of the FCC. Ford served in that role from March 15, 1960, to March 1, 1961. During his time as the Chairman, he was praised for being a man of integrity. One media critic called him "one of the most all-around competent commissioners ever to sit on the FCC" (Gould D25).

In late 1964, Ford suddenly left the FCC to become the president of a cable television trade association, the National Community Television Association, today known as the National Cable Television Association. In his new position as an advocate for the growing cable television industry, he was paid $50,000 a year (Kraslow 38).

Ford left the cable association in 1970, and returned to the practice of law. He died on July 28, 1986, at the age of 76.

Government offices
Preceded by George McConnaughey	Chairman of the Federal Communications Commission; March 1960 – March 1961	Succeeded by Newton N. Minow
