= TVAnswer =

TV Answer is the wireless communications company founded in 1986 that invented IVDS (Interactive Video and Data Services), a nationwide wireless multimedia platform including television, data, and digital voice services. TVAnswer is currently known as EON Corporation.

== History ==
In the late 1980s, TV Answer applied for and was later allocated special spectrum (218-219 MHz) by the Federal Communications Commission for its proposed service; however, the FCC denied the company’s request for a nationwide license and instead offered hundreds of regional and metropolitan licenses by lottery and auction. TV Answer's management team and board of directors, which included Hewlett Packard director George A. Keyworth and former FCC director Mark Fowler, directed the company’s engineers to file a series of domestic and international patents for its interactive video technologies and related network architecture. Recognizing that its advancements were applicable beyond interactive television, the company changed its name in 1993 to EON Corporation to mark the broader focus of its business initiatives. As EON Corporation, the company worked to establish a nationwide infrastructure for two-way data and messaging services. The applications ranged from advanced meter reading (the smart grid) to inventory monitoring and control of remote assets such as vending machines. TV Answer was featured prominently on national television and in the national media.

== Currently ==
Since 2008, the company has been actively licensing its wireless technologies to the communications and smart grid industries. The company continues to invest in developing wireless technology and sourcing applications across multiple industries.
