= George McConnaughey =

American politician (1896–1966)

George Calton McConnaughey

Chairman of the Federal Communications Commission
- In office October 4, 1954 – June 30, 1957
- President: Dwight D. Eisenhower
- Preceded by: Rosel Hyde
- Succeeded by: John C. Doerfer

Personal details
- Born: June 9, 1896 Hillsboro, Ohio
- Died: March 16, 1966 Columbus, Franklin, Ohio
- Party: Republican

George Calton McConnaughey (June 9, 1896 – March 16, 1966) served as chairman of the Federal Communications Commission (FCC) from October 4, 1954, to June 30, 1957 as a Republican. He died after a long illness with cancer. During McConnauthey's term a film of a Denver murder trial United Air Lines Flight 629 renewed interest in radio and television coverage in the courtroom.

== Early life ==
Prior to his chairmanship of the FCC, McConnauthey was educated in the Hillsboro Ohio public schools. From 1914 until 1917 he attended Denison University until the outbreak of world war I. During the war he enlisted in the Army and became a first lieutenant of field artillery. He was in combat service in the Meuse–Argonne offensive and served as liaison with the infantry in the Battle of Verdun. After being discharged from the Army in 1919, McConnaughey re-entered Denison University and obtained a Bachelor of Philosophy in 1918. PhD. degree in 1920. Graduated from Western Reserve University, 1923, Doctor of Laws.

== Ohio Public Utilities Commission ==
Tenure Ohio Public Utilities Commission. February 1, 1939 – 1945.

== Defense renegoiation Board ==
Chairman Renegotiation Board, 1953-1954.

== Tenure as Chairman of the Ohio Public Utilities Commission ==
George C. McConnaughey, Ohio; November 1944 - January 1945.

== Tenure at FCC ==
McConnaughey’s was nominated to chairmen FCC October 4, 1954. Time at the FCC was quiet, however there were storms on the horizon regarding the Commission’s relationship with the broadcast industry. Broadcasters were scandalized by the bribes to disk jockeys Payola for playing certain songs and by rigged contest shows. The FCC was also debating pay television, the role of ultra high frequency (UHF) channels, and accusations that licenses were renewed regardless of a station’s performance. resigned in 1957 in the face of bribery charges involving the awarding of television channels in Miami and Pittsburgh.

== Personal life ==
McConnaughey married Nelle Louise Morse on February 2, 1924, in Licking, Ohio with whom he had two children, George C. Mcconnaughey, Jr., and David C. McConnaughey. He died after a long illness with cancer on March 16, 1966 in Columbus, Franklin, Ohio. Married second wife, Charlotte Smith Daines, November 8, 1962.

Government offices
Preceded by Paul Atlee Walker	Chairman of the Federal Communications Commission; October 1954–June 1957	Succeeded by John C. Doerfer

== See also ==
- FCC Network Study Committee (1955)

Government offices
Preceded by Rosel H. Hyde	Chairman of the Federal Communications Commission; October 1954 – June 1957	Succeeded by John C. Doerfer
