= List of chairs of the Federal Communications Commission =

Chair of the Federal Communications Commission
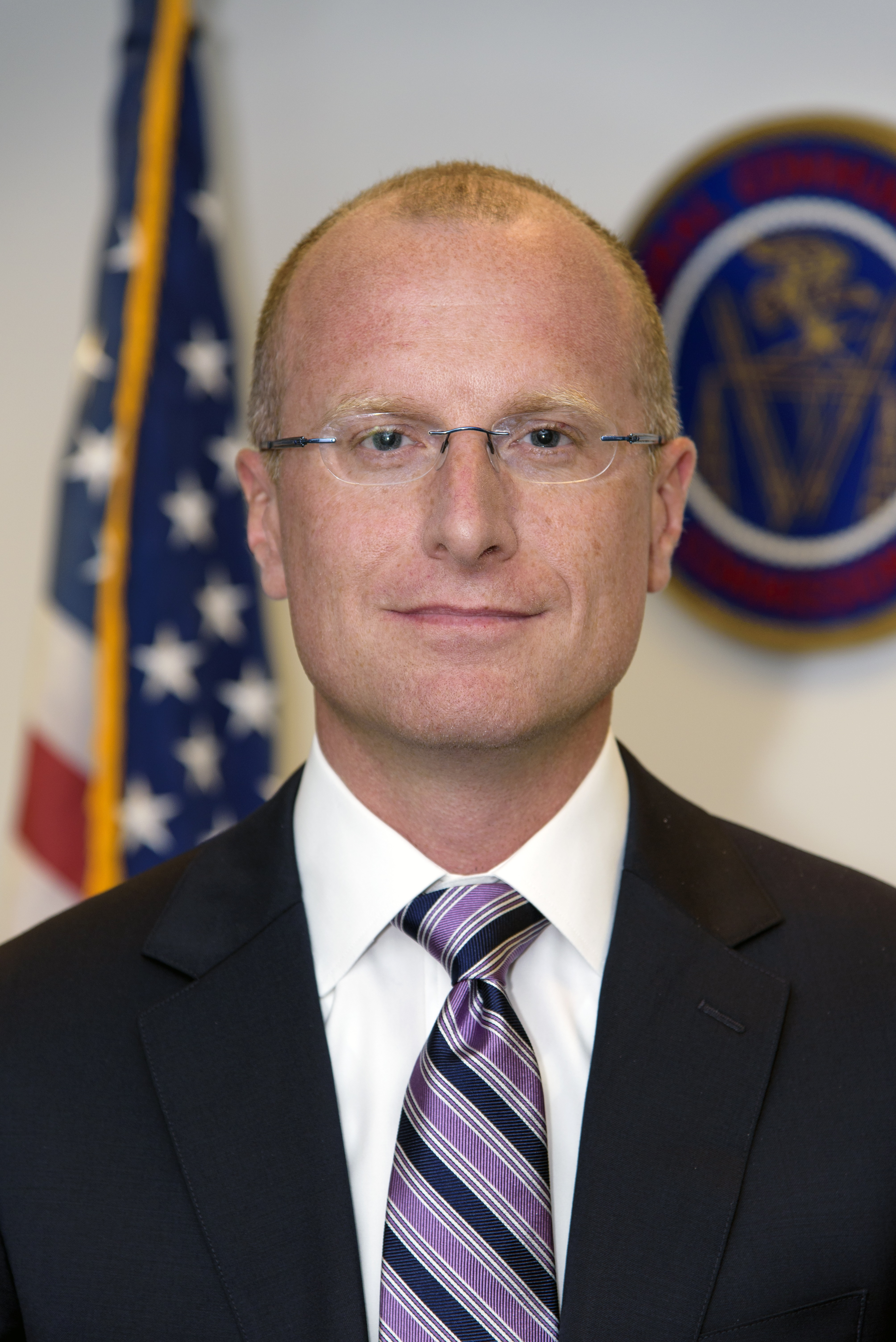
- Incumbent; Brendan Carr since January 20, 2025
- Term length: No fixed length
- First holder: Eugene Sykes

The following is a list of the chairs of the Federal Communications Commission.

== List ==
No.	Image	Commissioner	Party	Home state	Start	End	Refs.
1		Eugene O. Sykes	Democratic	Mississippi	July 11, 1934	March 8, 1935	
2		Anning S. Prall	Democratic	New York	March 9, 1935	July 23, 1937	
3		Frank R. McNinch	Democratic	North Carolina	October 1, 1937	August 31, 1939	
4		Larry Fly	Democratic	Texas	September 1, 1939	November 13, 1944	
Acting		E. K. Jett	Independent	Maryland	November 16, 1944	December 20, 1944	
5		Paul A. Porter	Democratic	Kentucky	December 21, 1944	February 25, 1946	
Acting		Charles R. Denny	Democratic	District of Columbia	February 26, 1946	December 3, 1946	
6		Charles R. Denny	Democratic	District of Columbia	December 3, 1946	October 31, 1947	
Acting		Paul A. Walker	Democratic	Oklahoma	November 3, 1947	December 28, 1947	
7		Wayne Coy	Democratic	Indiana	December 29, 1947	February 21, 1952	
8		Paul A. Walker	Democratic	Oklahoma	February 28, 1952	April 17, 1953	
9		Rosel H. Hyde	Republican	Idaho	April 18, 1953	October 3, 1954	
10		George McConnaughey	Republican	Ohio	October 4, 1954	June 30, 1957	
11		John C. Doerfer	Republican	Wisconsin	July 1, 1957	March 10, 1960	
12		Frederick W. Ford	Republican	West Virginia	March 15, 1960	March 1, 1961	
13		Newton N. Minow	Democratic	Illinois	March 2, 1961	June 1, 1963	
14		E. William Henry	Democratic	Tennessee	June 2, 1963	May 1, 1966	
Acting		Rosel H. Hyde	Republican	Idaho	May 1, 1966	June 27, 1966	
15		Rosel H. Hyde	Republican	Idaho	June 27, 1966	October 31, 1969	
16		Dean Burch	Republican	Arizona	October 31, 1969	March 8, 1974	
17		Richard E. Wiley	Republican	Illinois	March 8, 1974	October 13, 1977	
18		Charles D. Ferris	Democratic	Massachusetts	October 17, 1977	February 4, 1981	
Acting		Robert Lee	Republican	Illinois	February 5, 1981	April 13, 1981	
19		Robert Lee	Republican	Illinois	April 13, 1981	May 18, 1981	
20		Mark S. Fowler	Republican	Florida	May 18, 1981	April 17, 1987	
21		Dennis R. Patrick	Republican	California	April 18, 1987	August 7, 1989	
22		Alfred C. Sikes	Republican	Missouri	August 8, 1989	January 19, 1993	
Acting		James H. Quello	Democratic	Michigan	February 5, 1993	November 28, 1993	
23		Reed Hundt	Democratic	Maryland	November 29, 1993	November 3, 1997	
24		William Kennard	Democratic	California	November 3, 1997	January 19, 2001	
25		Michael Powell	Republican	Virginia	January 22, 2001	March 17, 2005	
26		Kevin Martin	Republican	North Carolina	March 18, 2005	January 20, 2009	
Acting		Michael Copps	Democratic	Wisconsin	January 22, 2009	June 28, 2009	
27		Julius Genachowski	Democratic	Washington, D.C.	June 29, 2009	May 17, 2013	
Acting		Mignon Clyburn	Democratic	South Carolina	May 20, 2013	November 4, 2013	
28		Tom Wheeler	Democratic	California	November 4, 2013	January 20, 2017	
29		Ajit Pai	Republican	Kansas	January 23, 2017	January 20, 2021	
Acting		Jessica Rosenworcel	Democratic	Connecticut	January 20, 2021	October 26, 2021	
30		Jessica Rosenworcel	Democratic	Connecticut	October 26, 2021	January 20, 2025	
31		Brendan Carr	Republican	Washington, D.C.	January 20, 2025	present	
