= Frank Ramsay McNinch House =

Historic house in North Carolina, United States

- U.S. National Register of Historic Places
- Location within North Carolina Location within the United States
- Location: 2727 Sharon Ln., Charlotte, North Carolina
- Coordinates: 35°9′39″N 80°49′9″W
- Area: 3.6 acres (1.5 ha)
- Built: 1925
- Built by: Thies-Smith Realty
- Architectural style: Colonial Revival
- NRHP reference No.: 99000670
- Added to NRHP: June 3, 1999

Frank Ramsay McNinch House is a historic home located at Charlotte, Mecklenburg County, North Carolina. It was built about 1925 for Charlotte mayor Frank R. McNinch, and is a two-story, five-bay, Colonial Revival style white frame dwelling. It is sheathed in weatherboard and has flanking exterior end chimneys. It features a prominent two-story, full-facade porch supported by six heavy, square, Tuscan order-style wooden piers. Also on the property is a contributing servant's quarters/garage.

It was listed on the National Register of Historic Places in 1999.
