= Benjamin Huberman =

American science advisor

Director of the Office of Science and Technology Policy
- Acting
- In office March 5, 1981 – August 1981
- President: Ronald Reagan
- Preceded by: Frank Press
- Succeeded by: George A. Keyworth II

Personal details
- Born: January 25, 1938 (age 88) Havana, Cuba
- Spouse: Gisela Bialik (m. 1963–2024)
- Education: Columbia University (BA, BS); Imperial College London (attended)

Benjamin Huberman (born 1938) is an American science advisor who formerly served as the acting director of the Office of Science and Technology Policy and acting Science Advisor to the President under President Ronald Reagan.

== Biography ==
Huberman was born in Cuba in 1938. He received his A.B. and B.S. degrees from Columbia University in 1959 and 1960, respectively, as well as a Diploma of the Imperial College from Imperial College, Univ. of London, which he attended as a Fulbright scholar. He was an officer in US Navy from 1960-1966 and was assigned to the technical staff of Admiral Hyman Rickover from 1961-1966.

Huberman was a senior official of the US Arms Control and Disarmament Agency from 1966-1973 and was a member of US delegations to the Eighteen Nation Disarmament Conference (ENDC) in Geneva and the UN General Assembly for the negotiations of the Nuclear Non-Proliferation Treaty (NPT) and then the SALT negotiations on strategic arms control with the USSR. Huberman served on the U.S. National Security Council as Deputy Director for Program Analysis under Presidents Richard Nixon and Gerald Ford. He was also the Director of Policy Evaluation for the Nuclear Regulatory Commission from 1975 to 1977, where he was credited for designing the seal of the commission in early 1975.

In 1978, he accompanied Zbigniew Brzezinski on his first trip to China as well as a delegation headed by Presidential Science Advisor Frank Press. In 1979, he travelled to China with Vice President Walter Mondale and also accompanied President Carter to Mexico where he signed for the U.S. a memorandum of understanding on US-Mexican Cooperation in Science and Technology.

Huberman served as the Assistant Director of the Office of Science and Technology Policy from 1978 to 1981 and Deputy Science Advisor to Ronald Reagan in 1981. He was appointed by Ronald Reagan acting director of OSTP on March 5, 1981. He had a joint appointment as a senior official of the National Security Council staff from 1977-1981. From 1983 to 2015 he was a member of the Chief of Naval Operations Executive Panel, serving as Chairman 2000-2015.

Government offices
Preceded by Frank Press	Director of the Office of Science and Technology Policy; Acting; 1981	Succeeded by George A. Keyworth II
