= Anning Smith Prall =

American politician

Anning S. Prall
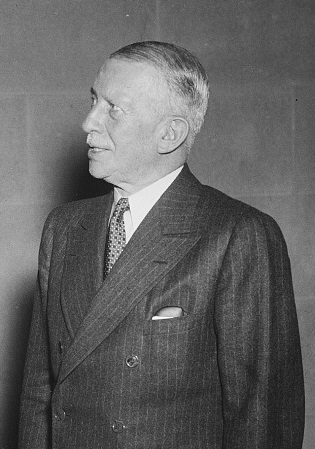
- Prall in 1936

Member of the U.S. House of Representatives from New York's 11th district
- In office November 6, 1923 – January 3, 1935
- Preceded by: Daniel J. Riordan
- Succeeded by: James A. O'Leary

2nd Chairman of the Federal Communications Commission
- In office March 9, 1935 – June 23, 1937
- President: Franklin D. Roosevelt
- Preceded by: Eugene Sikes
- Succeeded by: Frank McNich

Personal details
- Born: Anning Smith Prall; September 17, 1870 Staten Island, New York, U.S.
- Died: July 23, 1937 (aged 66) Boothbay Harbor, Maine, U.S.
- Resting place: Moravian Cemetery in New Dorp, Staten Island
- Party: Democratic

Anning Smith Prall (September 17, 1870 – July 23, 1937) was an American businessman and politician who served 6-terms as a U.S. representative from New York from 1923 to 1935.

He was born in Port Richmond, Staten Island and the first chief commissioner of the Federal Communications Commission (FCC). Prall served as a member and chairman of the FCC from January 15, 1935, until his death in 1937 at his summer home in Boothbay Harbor, Maine.

== Career ==
In his early years Prall was employed as a clerk in a New York newspaper office. Prall attended New York University, studying business. From 1908 until 1918, he was in charge of a real estate department of a bank, while serving as the first president of the Staten Island Board of Realtors from 1915 to 1916.

=== Early public service ===
In 1918, Prall began a public service career when he was appointed Clerk of New York City's First District Municipal Court. He was appointed a member of the New York City Board of Education on January 1, 1918, and served until December 31, 1921, and was elected the board's president. He was New York City's commissioner of taxes and assessment from 1922 to 1923.

=== Congress ===
He was a delegate to the 1924 Democratic National Convention and was elected as a Democrat to the Sixty-eighth Congress to fill the vacancy caused by the death of Daniel J. Riordan. He was reelected to the sixty-ninth and to the four succeeding Congresses and served from November 6, 1923, to January 3, 1935. He was not a candidate for renomination in 1934.

== Death ==
He died on July 23, 1937, and is interred at Moravian Cemetery in New Dorp, Staten Island.

== Legacy ==
Intermediate school (I.S.) 27 on Staten Island is also known as the Anning S. Prall School. He also served as Chairman of the FCC from March 9, 1935, to June 23, 1937.

U.S. House of Representatives
Preceded by Daniel J. Riordan	Member of the U.S. House of Representatives from New York's 11th congressional district November 6, 1923 – January 3, 1935	Succeeded by James A. O'Leary
