= George A. Keyworth II =

1980's White House Science Advisor

Jay Keyworth
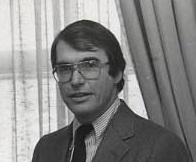

3rd Director of the Office of Science and Technology Policy
- In office August 1981 – December 1985
- President: Ronald Reagan
- Preceded by: Benjamin Huberman (Acting)
- Succeeded by: John McTague (Acting)

Personal details
- Born: November 30, 1939 Boston, Massachusetts, U.S.
- Died: August 23, 2017 (aged 77) Monterey, California, U.S.
- Party: Republican
- Education: Yale University (BS); Duke University (MS, PhD)
- Scientific career
- Fields: Physics
- Institutions: Los Alamos National Laboratory
- Thesis: A high resolution study of isobaric analogue states in potassium-41 and sodium-23 (1968)
- Doctoral advisor: Edward Bilpuch

George Albert "Jay" Keyworth II (G. A. Keyworth) (November 30, 1939 – August 23, 2017) was an American physicist who served as White House Science Advisor from 1981 to January 1986. He was a board member of Hewlett-Packard who was asked to step down in light of the controversy surrounding disclosure of sensitive information to the media. He resigned on September 13, 2006.

== Education and career ==
Keyworth attended Deerfield Academy and then received a B.S. in Physics from Yale University in 1963 and a PhD in physics from Duke University in 1968. Following the granting of his degree, he took a position at Los Alamos National Laboratory, where he rose to become leader of the Physics Division, the position he held when he was asked to become the presidential Science Advisor.

Keyworth was chairman and senior fellow with the Progress & Freedom Foundation from 1995.

Keyworth was also on the board of directors for Eon Corporation (formally known as TV Answer) from 1990 to 1994. He worked as a liaison between TV Answer and Hewlett-Packard which eventually led to a manufacturing and marketing partnership between the two companies that was designed to speed the development of the first national interactive television system. Keyworth facilitated the agreement between HP and TV Answer to manufacture and market interactive television home units that would activate and control TV Answer's two-way system in the home.

He was Science Advisor to the President and director of the White House's Office of Science and Technology Policy from 1981 to early 1986. He also served as a director of General Atomics.

=== Hewlett-Packard resignation ===
In early 2005, after news leaks about then-CEO Carly Fiorina's clashes with the board surfaced, Fiorina hired a law firm to find the source. In February 2005, Fiorina left the company and Patricia Dunn, non-executive chairwoman, continued the investigation. As part of a larger scandal, a subcontractor used pretexting to expose Keyworth as the source of an alleged additional leak to CNET, and he was outed in a May 18, 2006 board meeting. At the meeting, Dunn asked Keyworth to resign, he refused asserting that he was not the source of any unauthorized or inappropriate communication with reporters, and another board member (Tom Perkins) resigned over the way Keyworth was being treated. HP revealed the story on September 6, 2006, and said that they were not seeking Keyworth's reelection to the board. Coinciding with Mark V. Hurd's promotion to chairman, Keyworth resigned on September 12. In connection with Keyworth's resignation, HP made the following statement regarding the alleged CNET leak: "At HP's request, Dr. Keyworth often had contacts with the press to explain HP's interests. The board does not believe that Dr. Keyworth's contact with CNET in January 2006 was vetted through appropriate channels, but also recognizes that his discussion with the CNET reporter was undertaken in an attempt to further HP's interests. HP board chairman Patricia Dunn expressed regret for the intrusion into his privacy."

Keyworth had been a director of HP since 1986 and, until his resignation, was the longest-serving director at the company.

== Death ==
Keyworth died at his home in Monterey, California of prostate cancer on August 23, 2017, at the age of 77.

== See also ==
- Tom Perkins

Government offices
| Preceded by Benjamin Huberman; Acting | Director of the Office of Science and Technology Policy; 1981–1986 | Succeeded by John McTague; Acting |
