= Newton N. Minow =

American attorney (1926–2023)

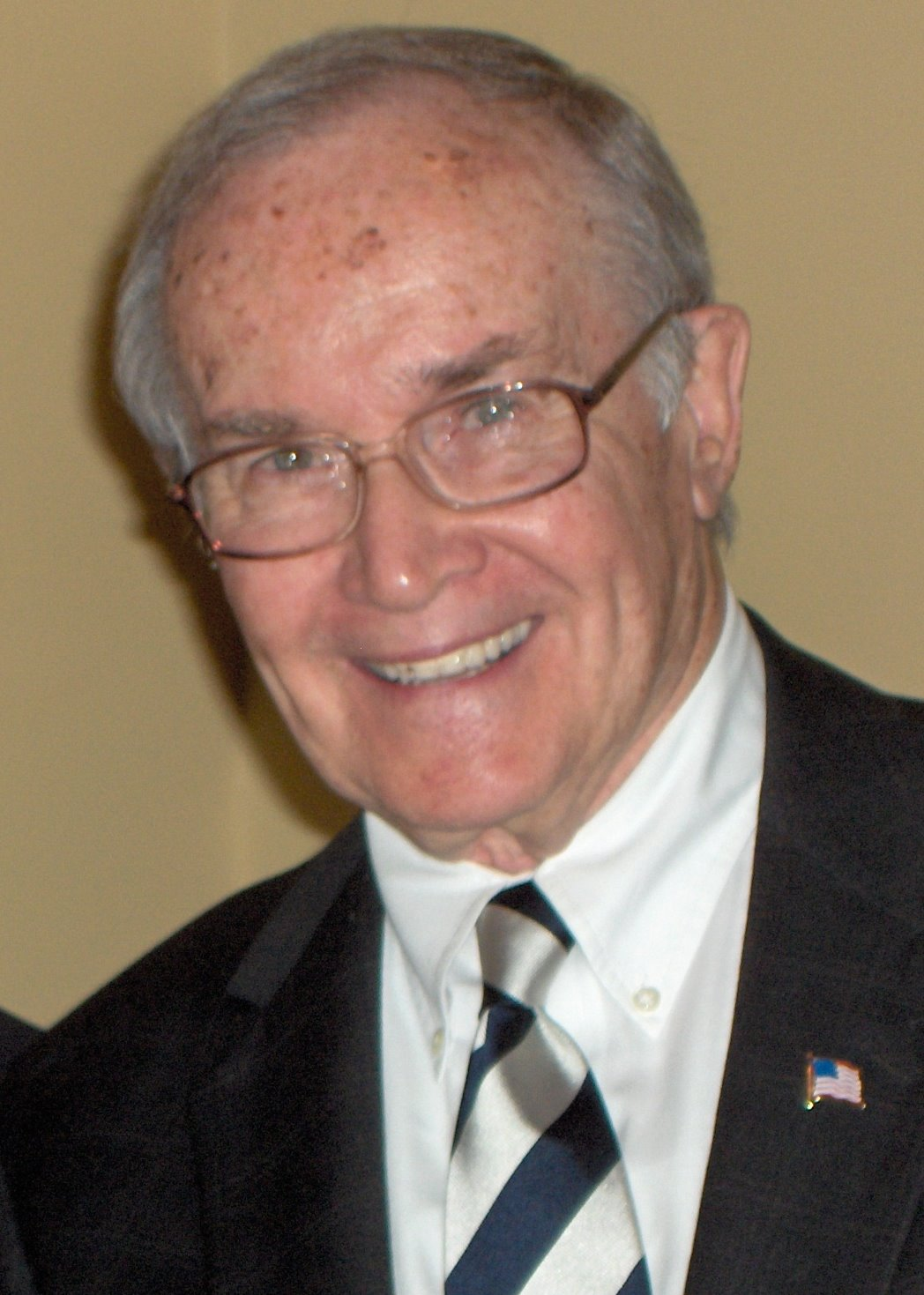
- Minow in 2006

Chairman of the Federal Communications Commission
- In office March 2, 1961 – June 1, 1963
- President: John F. Kennedy
- Preceded by: Frederick Ford
- Succeeded by: E. William Henry

Personal details
- Born: Newton Norman Minow; January 17, 1926 Milwaukee, Wisconsin, U.S.
- Died: May 6, 2023 (aged 97) Chicago, Illinois, U.S.
- Party: Democratic
- Spouse: Josephine Baskin (m. 1949; died 2022)
- Children: 3, including Martha and Nell
- Education: Northwestern University (BS, JD)

Military service
- Branch/service: United States Army; Army Service Forces
- Years of service: 1944‍–‍1946
- Rank: Sergeant
- Unit: 835th Signal Service Battalion
- Battles/wars: World War II; China Burma India theater

Newton Norman Minow (January 17, 1926 – May 6, 2023) was an American attorney who served as chairman of the Federal Communications Commission. He is famous for his 1961 speech referring to television as a "vast wasteland". While still maintaining a law practice, Minow served as the honorary consul general of Singapore in Chicago, beginning in 2001.

Minow was active in Democratic Party politics. He was an attorney in private practice concerning telecommunications law and was active in many nonprofit, civic, and educational institutions. He was awarded the Presidential Medal of Freedom in 2016 by Barack Obama, whom he had known since the start of Obama's legal career.

== Early life and education ==
Born to a Jewish family in Milwaukee, Wisconsin, in 1926, Minow served in World War II from 1944 to 1946 and attained the rank of a sergeant in the U.S. Army. He served in the China Burma India Theater with the 835th Signal Service Battalion headquartered in New Delhi, India. After the war, he received a Bachelor of Science degree in 1949 from Northwestern University and a Juris Doctor degree in 1950 from Northwestern University School of Law.

== Career ==
=== Legal career ===
After graduating from law school, Minow worked for the law firm of Mayer, Brown & Platt (1950–1951 and 1953–1955) before becoming a law clerk to Chief Justice Fred M. Vinson of the U.S. Supreme Court (1951–1952). He later became assistant counsel to Illinois Governor Adlai Stevenson (1952–1953), worked for Stevenson's two presidential campaigns (1952 and 1956), and then was a partner in the law firm, Stevenson, Rifkind & Wirtz (1955–1961). Minow campaigned for President John F. Kennedy prior to the 1960 U.S. presidential election.

Minow was the senior counsel in the Chicago-headquartered law firm of Sidley Austin LLP, a large international law firm with multiple areas of expertise, including telecommunications-related law. Between 1965 and 1991, he was a managing partner in the firm before becoming senior counsel in 1991.

=== Communication career ===
==== As Federal Communications Commission chairman ====
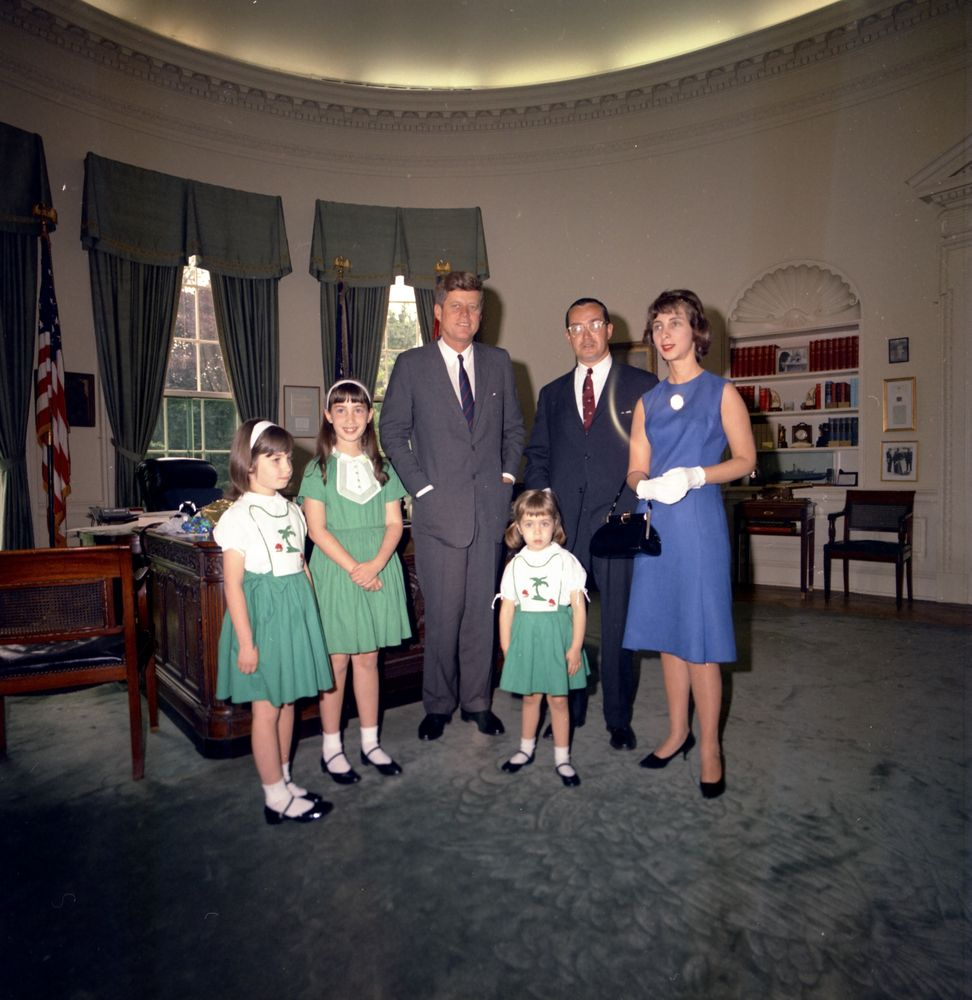
Minow and his family with President John F. Kennedy in 1963

Reportedly, Robert F. Kennedy and Minow frequently talked at length about the increasing importance of television in the lives of their children when they worked together on the presidential campaign of Adlai E. Stevenson. Thereafter, it came as little surprise that after the election of John F. Kennedy, Minow eagerly pursued the position of FCC chairman. Some observers nevertheless considered it unusual given his lack of experience with the media industry and with communication law. In 1961 he was appointed by President Kennedy to be one of seven commissioners of the Federal Communications Commission (FCC) as well as its chairman. He served as chairman from March 2, 1961, through June 1, 1963.

===== Criticism and evaluation =====
Minow became one of the best-known and respected—if sometimes controversial—political figures of the early 1960s because of his criticism of commercial television. In a speech given to the National Association of Broadcasters convention on May 9, 1961, he was extremely critical of television broadcasters for not doing more, in Minow's view, to serve the public interest. His phrase "vast wasteland" is remembered years after the speech in which he said:

When television is good, nothing—not the theater, not the magazines or newspapers—nothing is better. But when television is bad, nothing is worse. I invite each of you to sit down in front of your television set when your station goes on the air and stay there for a day without a book, without a magazine, without a newspaper, without a profit and loss sheet or a rating book to distract you. Keep your eyes glued to that set until the station signs off. I can assure you that what you will observe is a vast wasteland.

While some applauded his "vast wasteland" assault on commercial television as a welcome criticism of excessive violence and frivolity, others criticized it as an elitist, snobbish attack on programming that many viewers enjoyed as well as a government intrusion into private enterprise. The S.S. Minnow of the 1964–67 television show Gilligan's Island was reputedly sarcastically named after him to express displeasure with his assessment of the quality of television.

In a 2011 speech at Harvard, Minow said that he could never have anticipated the impact of television. He still felt that news is the most important public service, but that television continued to fall short in that area. "Too much deals with covering controversy, crimes, fires, and not enough with the country's great issues" he said. He also said that presidential campaigns are obsessed with the trivial. The speech came 50 years after he referred to television as a "vast wasteland" on May 9, 1961. The day after the 1961 speech, the New York Times headline read "F.C.C. Head Bids TV Men Reform 'Vast Wasteland'—Minow Charges Failure in Public Duty—Threatens to Use License Power".

===== Achievements at the Federal Communications Commission =====
Minow did foster two significant initiatives that altered the landscape of American television. The first was the All-Channel Receiver Act (ACRA) of 1961, which mandated UHF reception capability for all television receivers sold in the United States. This legislation sparked an increase in the number of television stations and helped launch nonprofit educational television stations (now PBS) throughout the country.

Minow said that his greatest contribution was persuading U. S. Congress to pass legislation clearing the way for communications satellites. Minow recounted, "When I toured the space program with [John F.] Kennedy, he was surprised to see me". Minow told Kennedy that "communications satellites will be much more important than sending man into space, because they will send ideas into space. Ideas last longer than men."

During his two years in office, it was estimated that, other than the president, Minow generated more column inches of news coverage than any other federal official. He also promoted what ultimately became the International Telecommunications Satellite Consortium (Intelsat). This organization controlled satellite communications for many years.

Minow's papers from his tenure at the FCC are archived at the Wisconsin Center for Film and Theater Research, an organization co-sponsored by the University of Wisconsin-Madison and the Wisconsin Historical Society.

Quote from a speech to the Association of American Law Schools:

After 35 years, I have finished a comprehensive study of European comparative law. In Germany, under the law, everything is prohibited, except that which is permitted. In France, under the law, everything is permitted, except that which is prohibited. In the Soviet Union, under the law, everything is prohibited, including that which is permitted. And in Italy, under the law, everything is permitted, especially that which is prohibited.

==== As part of Board of Governors of the Public Broadcasting Service ====
Minow sat on the Board of Governors of the Public Broadcasting Service and its predecessor, National Educational Television serving from 1973 to 1980 and serving as its chairman from 1978 to 1980. He served out a tenure as the president of the Carnegie Corporation, a PBS sponsor, and the original funder of Sesame Street.

Minow was the Walter Annenberg professor emeritus at Northwestern University. He also authored four books and numerous professional journal and magazine articles. Minow supported and wrote about the Digital Promise Project, a project to fulfill the educational potential of the internet.

=== Diplomatic career ===
Minow's early contact with Singapore and Singaporean officials was through his law work at Sidley Austin, which opened a Singapore office in 1982. Even when he was FCC chairman, he worried about the increasing export of Hollywood programming overseas and the impact it would have on perceptions of the United States among citizens in other countries.

Minow was appointed honorary consul general in 2001. The office he was associated with processes consular and visa applications.

=== Corporate work ===
Minow sat on the board of directors at Foote, Cone & Belding Communications Inc.; Tribune Co.; Manpower, Inc.; AON Corp.; CBS, and the Sara Lee Corporation. He was chairman of the Board at the RAND Corporation. He was a trustee of the Chicago Orchestral Association as well as with the Mayo Foundation, which operates the Mayo Clinic. He was a life trustee of Northwestern University and the University of Notre Dame, where he was the first Jewish member of the board, and at the time of his death he was the chairman of the Board of the World Health Imaging, Telemedicine and Informatics Alliance.

Between 2015 and 2018, Minow served as a member of the Executive Advisory Council of the American Archive of Public Broadcasting (AAPB), after which, his daughter Mary Minow joined the council. In 2020, the AAPB launched the 'Broadcasting in the Public Interest: The Newton Minow Collection' to honor Minow's role in developing noncommercial television. The collection includes interviews, panels, testimonies, events, and profiles featuring him between 1961 and 2016.

== Contemporary politics ==
Minow co-chaired the 1976 and 1980 presidential debates and was a vice-chairman of the Commission on Presidential Debates. He served on numerous presidential commissions and was chairman of a special advisory committee to the Secretary of Defense on protecting civil liberties in the fight against terrorism. His book on the history of the presidential debates was released in 2008.

Minow was a prominent supporter of Barack Obama's candidacy for President of the United States. Minow recruited Obama in 1988 to work for his law firm Sidley Austin LLP as a summer associate, where Obama met his future wife Michelle Robinson. Minow pursued Obama on the recommendation of his daughter Martha, who was one of Barack Obama's law professors.

According to Michelle Obama's book Becoming, Minow and his wife "busted" then Michelle Robinson and Barack Obama—both still associates at Sidley Austin—on their first date, greeting them "warmly" in the popcorn line at the Water Tower Place cinema, before the new couple saw Spike Lee's movie, Do The Right Thing. Robinson and Obama had wanted to keep their relationship a secret from colleagues at the firm; Minow only "smiled" and "made no comment" at the fact they were together.

Minow supported Republican Bruce Rauner in the 2014 Illinois gubernatorial election, despite his history in Democratic politics. He said his vote was a response to the poor track record of Democratic governance in Illinois.

== Awards ==
Minow was the recipient of 12 honorary degrees. He was a recipient of the Peabody Award in 1961 and the Woodrow Wilson Award for public service. He was also a member of the Peabody Awards Board of Jurors from 1963 to 1976.

Minow was inducted as a laureate of The Lincoln Academy of Illinois and awarded the Order of Lincoln (the State's highest honor) by the Governor of Illinois, Pat Quinn in 2014 in the area of Government & Law.

Minow received the Presidential Medal of Freedom from President Barack Obama on November 22, 2016.

== Personal life ==
Minow married Josephine Baskin in 1949. They had three daughters, all trained as lawyers: Nell Minow, shareholder activist and movie critic; Martha L. Minow, law professor and former dean of Harvard Law School; and Mary Minow, a library law expert appointed by President Obama to the National Museum and Library Services Board. Josephine Baskin Minow died on February 17, 2022, at age 95.

Minow was a great-uncle to Adam Frankel, a speechwriter of his former protege, Barack Obama. Josephine Minow's older sister, Irene, is Frankel's paternal grandmother.

Minow died from a heart attack at home in Chicago, on May 6, 2023, at age 97.

== In popular culture ==
According to Nell Minow and Robert M. Jarvis, the ill-fated fictional vessel S.S. Minnow from the TV series Gilligan's Island was named after Newton Minow by the producer Sherwood Schwartz to "punish" Minow for his "vast wasteland" speech.

== Books ==
- Abandoned in the Wasteland: Children, Television, and the First Amendment ISBN 0-8090-1589-7
- Presidential Television ISBN 0-465-06274-1
- For Great Debates: A New Plan for Future Presidential TV Debates ISBN 0-87078-212-6
- A Digital Gift for the Nation (with Larry Grossman) ISBN 0-87078-466-8
- Equal Time: The Private Broadcaster and the Public Interest ASIN B0007DZB86
- Inside the Presidential Debates: Their Improbable Past and Promising Future (co-authored by Craig L. LaMay) ISBN 0-226-53041-8

== See also ==
- List of law clerks for the chief justice of the United States

Government offices
| Preceded by Frederick W. Ford | Chairman of the Federal Communications Commission; March 1961 – May 15, 1963 | Succeeded by E. William Henry |
