= Frank R. McNinch =

American politician (1873–1950)

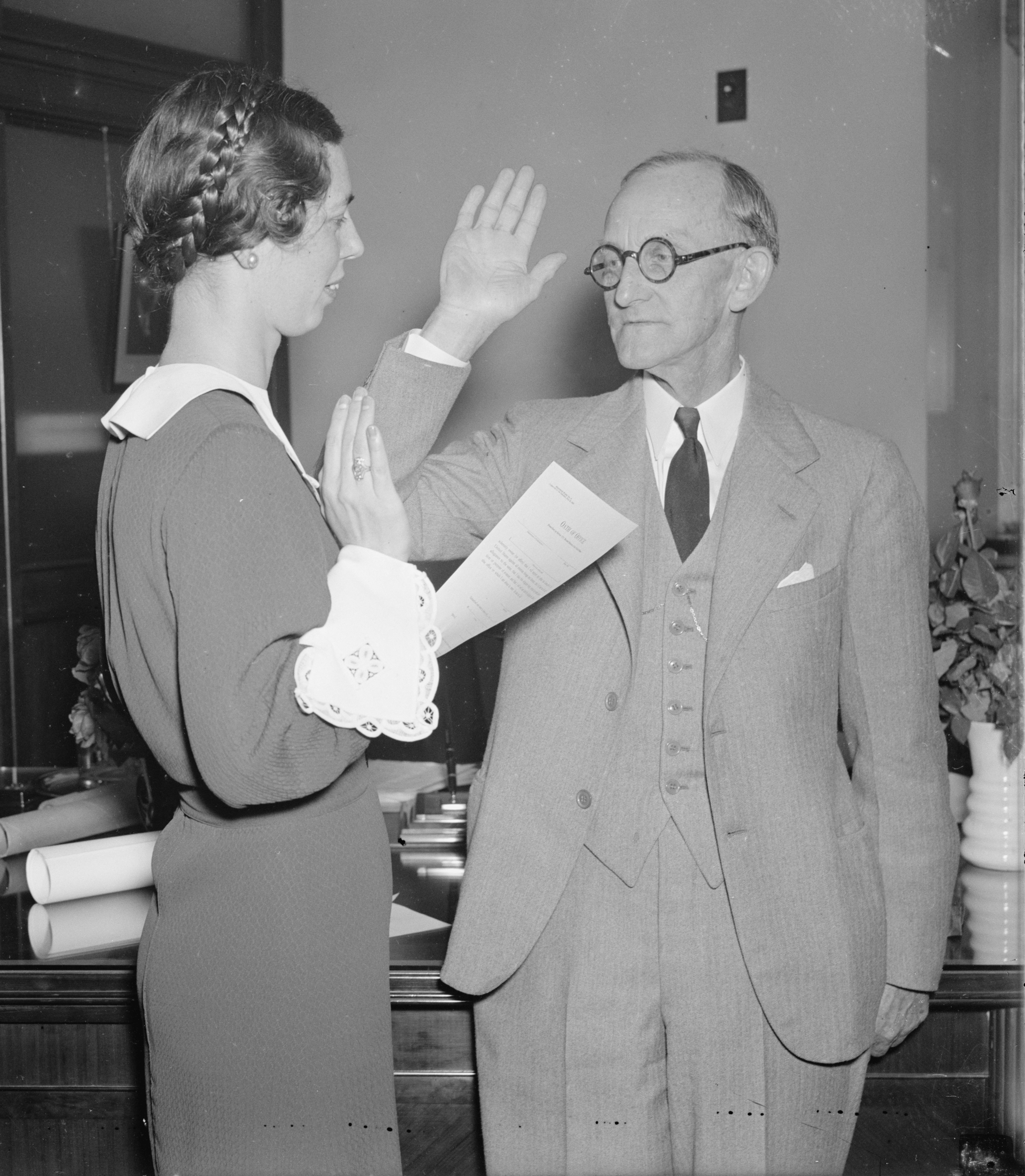
- McNinch takes the oath of office, October 1, 1937, administered by Pansy Wiltshire; photo by Harris & Ewing

3rd Chairman of the Federal Communications Commission
- In office October 1, 1937 – July 25, 1939
- President: Franklin D. Roosevelt
- Preceded by: Anning S. Prall
- Succeeded by: James Lawrence Fly

2nd Chairman of the Federal Power Commission
- In office July 19, 1933 – September 30, 1937
- Preceded by: George Otis Smith
- Succeeded by: Clyde L. Seavey

Member of the Federal Power Commission
- In office December 27, 1930 - June 22, 1934
- President: Herbert Hoover; Franklin D. Roosevelt
- Preceded by: position established

Mayor of Charlotte
- In office 1917–1920
- Preceded by: Thomas Kirkpatrick
- Succeeded by: John Wilson

Personal details
- Born: Frank Ramsay McNinch; April 27, 1873 Charlotte, North Carolina
- Died: April 2, 1950 (aged 76)
- Party: Democratic

Frank Ramsay McNinch (April 27, 1873 – April 2, 1950) was a political figure who served as the mayor of Charlotte, as chairman of the Federal Power Commission, and as chairman of the Federal Communications Commission. In the 1928 presidential election, McNinch, a Democrat, supported Republican Herbert Hoover for president. After he was elected, Hoover appointed McNinch to a seat on the Federal Power Commission, leading to a split in the North Carolina Democratic Party that damaged the political fortunes of new U.S. Sen. Cameron Morrison, a friend of McNinch. He was later appointed FPC chairman by Franklin D. Roosevelt.

The controversial 1938 Orson Welles War of the Worlds radio broadcast occurred during his tenure as FCC head. McNinch resigned as FCC chairman on July 25, 1939, due to ill health.

His home, the Frank Ramsay McNinch House, was listed on the National Register of Historic Places in 1999.

Government offices
| Preceded by Anning S. Prall | Chairman of the Federal Communications Commission; 1 October 1937 – 25 July 1939 | Succeeded by James Lawrence Fly |
