= Paul A. Porter =

American lawyer and politician (1904–1975)

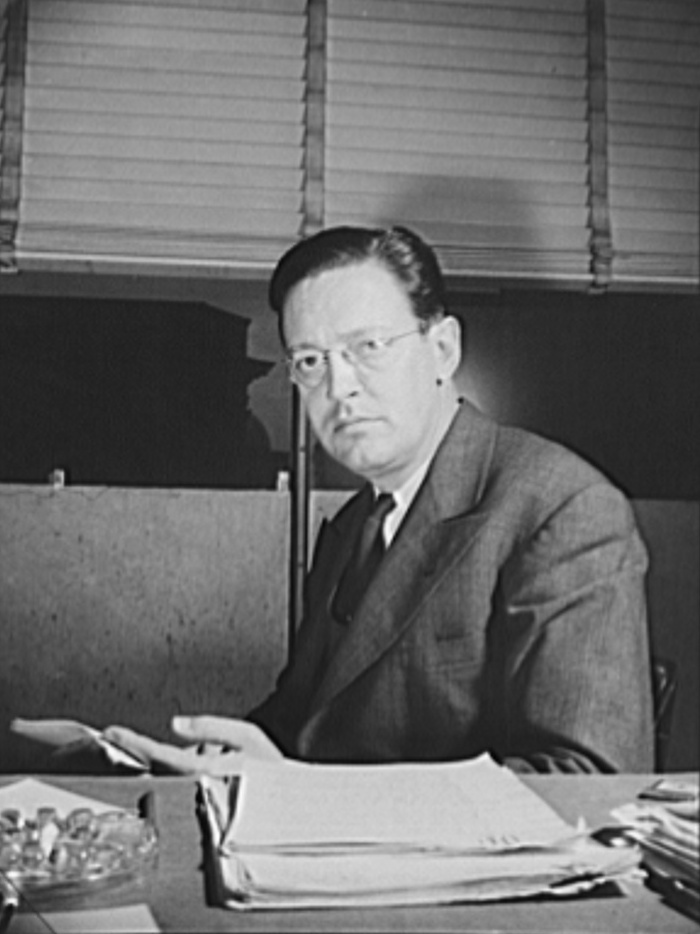

Administrator of the Office of Price Administration
- In office February 21, 1946 – December 4, 1946
- President: Harry S. Truman
- Preceded by: Chester B. Bowles
- Succeeded by: Office abolished

Chairman of the Federal Communications Commission
- In office December 21, 1944 – February 25, 1946
- Nominated by: Franklin D. Roosevelt
- Preceded by: E. K. Jett
- Succeeded by: Charles R. Denny

Personal details
- Born: Paul Aldermandt Porter; October 6, 1904 Joplin, Missouri, US
- Died: November 26, 1975 (aged 71) Washington, D. C., US
- Party: Democratic
- Spouse(s): Bessie Edgar Banton (div. 1956); Kathleen Winsor (1956–his death)
- Education: University of Kentucky; Kentucky Wesleyan College
- Profession: lawyer

Paul Aldermandt Porter (October 6, 1904 – November 26, 1975) was an American lawyer and politician. He served as chairman of the Federal Communications Commission from 1944 to 1946. The following year he joined Washington, D.C. law firm Arnold & Fortas, now known as Arnold & Porter. In addition to his career in public service, he became a member of the Peabody Awards Board of Jurors, serving from 1947 to 1963.

== Biography ==
Born in Joplin, Missouri, Porter's family moved to Winchester, Kentucky when he was very young. He graduated from Kentucky Wesleyan College and attained a law degree from the University of Kentucky College of Law. While in law school, he worked as city editor for the Lexington Herald. Fresh from law school, he joined the law firm of Judge J.M. Banton, where he was assigned to work on the Al Smith presidential campaign in Clark County, where he lived. After the election, he joined General Newspapers, where he worked on acquisitions. He was married to Bessie Edgar Benton, a friend from childhood and the daughter of J.M. Banton; they had two children. The couple divorced in 1956, and Porter later married Kathleen Winsor.

Porter served as the Democratic National Committee's head of publicity for the party's successful 1944 election campaign, which saw Democrats increase their majority in the House of Representatives and the reelection of President Franklin D. Roosevelt. Prior to his work for the Democratic Party, Porter had held a number of jobs in the Roosevelt administration, starting with the Department of Agriculture, from 1933 to 1937. He left the government to work as Washington counsel for CBS, taking leave in 1940 to join the National Defense Council. In 1942, Porter left CBS to join the Office of Price Administration as deputy administrator, and then assistant director of the Office of Economic Stabilization under Fred M. Vinson.

== FCC service ==
Porter was nominated by President Roosevelt on November 16, 1944, to fill out the remaining term of departing FCC chairman James Lawrence Fly, and took office on December 21 of that year under a recess appointment after the Senate failed to take up the nomination before the end of the Congressional session. Roosevelt designated Porter as FCC chairman at the same time, succeeding interim chairman Ewell K. Jett. When the next Congress assembled in January 1945, Porter was renominated and was unanimously confirmed on January 18, 1945. Porter did not serve out his full term, which would have expired on June 30, 1949, instead leaving the FCC in February 1946. He was succeeded as chairman by sitting commissioner Charles R. Denny.

President Harry Truman appointed Porter to head the American Economic Mission to Greece, with the rank of ambassador, in 1946. Two years later, he represented the United States at the Middle East peace talks in Geneva.

== Death ==
On November 21, 1975, Porter was eating dinner at a restaurant with his wife and friends when he choked on a piece of lobster. He went into a coma, and died five days later at George Washington University Hospital. Porter's personal papers are in the Truman Library.

Government offices
Preceded by Ewell K. Jett	Chairman of the Federal Communications Commission; 1944–1946	Succeeded by Charles R. Denny
