= James Lawrence Fly =

American lawyer

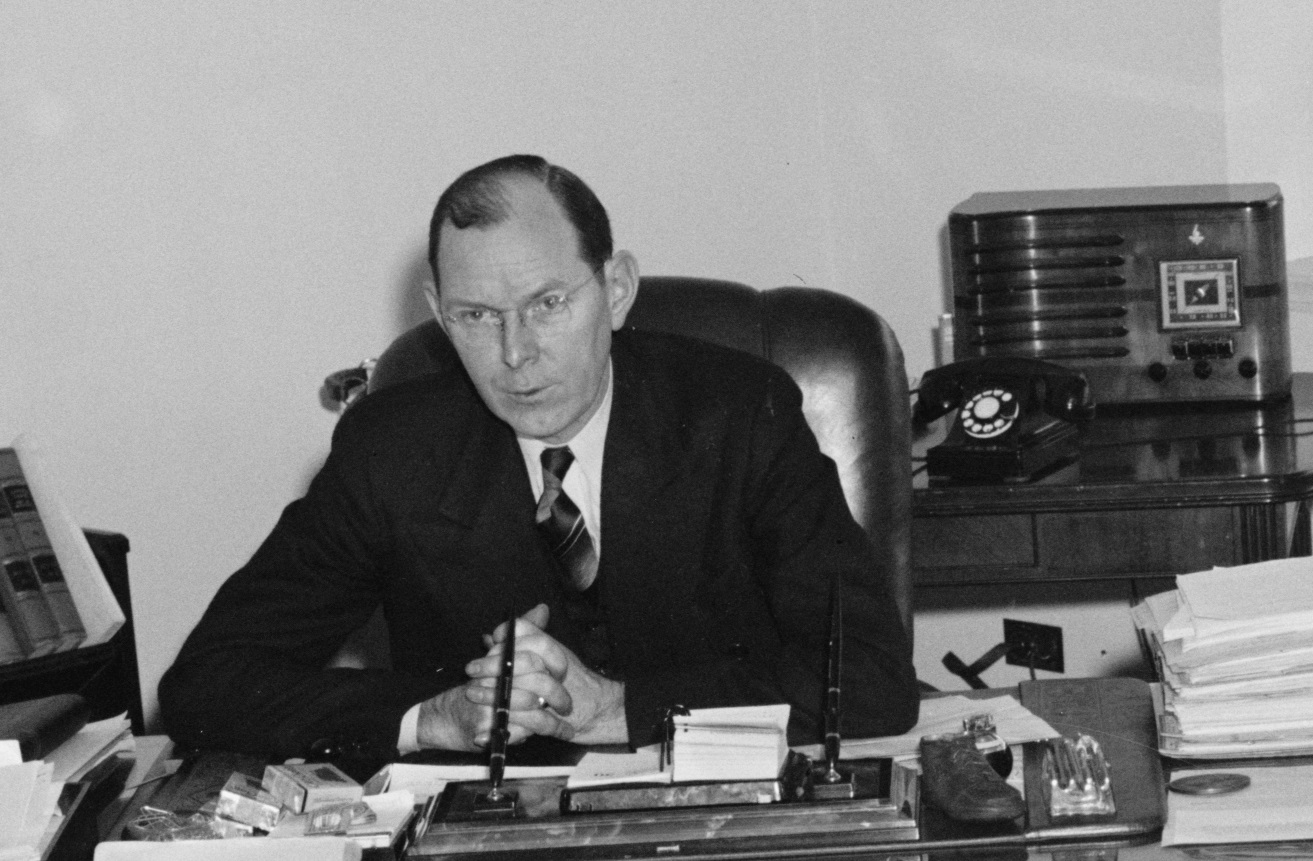

Chairman of the Federal Communications Commission
- In office September 1, 1939 – November 13, 1944
- President: Franklin D. Roosevelt
- Preceded by: Frank R. McNinch
- Succeeded by: Ewell K. Jett

Chairman, Defense Communications Board
- In office September 24, 1940 – November 13, 1944
- Preceded by: office created
- Succeeded by: Ewell K. Jett

Personal details
- Born: February 22, 1898 Dallas County, Texas
- Died: January 6, 1966 (aged 67) Daytona Beach, Florida
- Party: Democratic
- Spouse: Mildred Marvin Jones
- Children: James Lawrence Fly, Jr., and Sara Virginia Fly
- Education: United States Naval Academy, Harvard Law School
- Occupation: lawyer

Military service
- Branch/service: United States Navy
- Years of service: 1920–1923

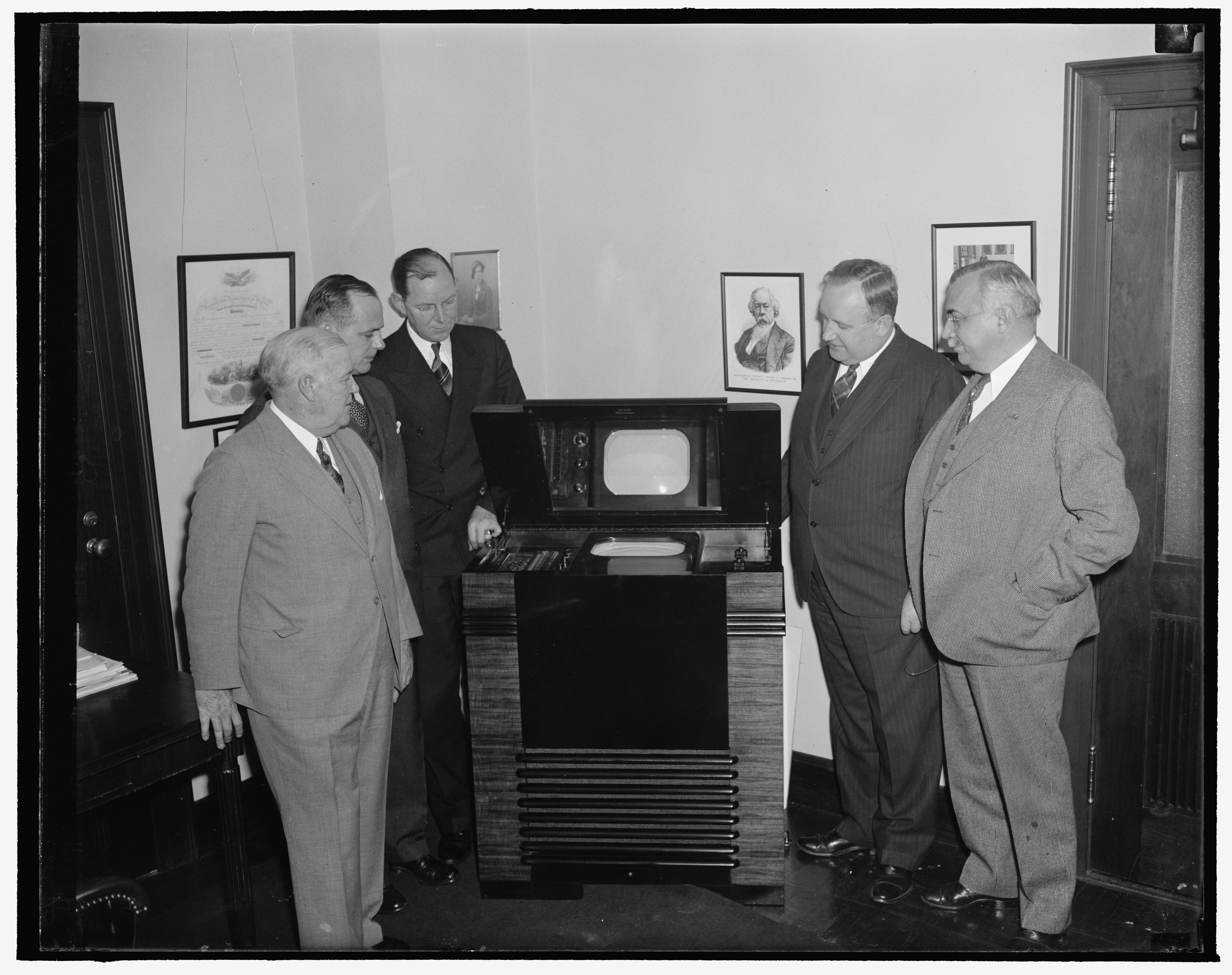
FCC Commissioners Frederick I. Thompson, T.A.M. Craven, Chairman James Lawrence Fly, Commissioners Thad H. Brown, and Norman S. Case, left to right, inspect the latest in television, December 1, 1939.

James Lawrence "Larry" Fly (February 22, 1898 – January 6, 1966) was an American lawyer, famous as chairman of the Federal Communications Commission and, later, director of the American Civil Liberties Union. He helped inaugurate standards for commercial television broadcasting, and vigorously opposed wiretapping throughout his career.

== Early life ==
Fly grew up in Texas and graduated from North Dallas High School in 1916. He then graduated from the United States Naval Academy before serving three years in the United States Navy. He resigned to earn a law degree from Harvard Law School. After a short time in private practice, Fly took a position prosecuting antitrust cases for the government. He joined the Tennessee Valley Authority in 1934, rising from solicitor general to general counsel. Fly married Mildred Marvin Jones in 1923, with whom he had two children, James Lawrence Jr., and Sara Virginia.

== FCC chairmanship ==
When Fly was appointed to replace Frank McNinch as FCC chairman in 1939, commercial television had not yet begun in the U.S. In April of that year, RCA attempted to broadcast commercial content in New York City using standards set by the Radio Manufacturers Association (now the Electronic Industries Alliance), but these broadcasts were unauthorized and experimental. In December 1939 the FCC announced it would authorize limited commercial broadcasts, but it was not clear what standards should be used. By early 1940 RCA made aggressive moves to dominate the industry, and many of their competitors objected. The FCC halted all commercial broadcasts, and insisting that the television industry as a whole develop standards before broadcasting continue. To break this impasse, Fly urged Walter R. G. Baker to found the National Television System Committee, or NTSC, and negotiations were soon reached. This became the model that the FCC has used repeatedly when developing new standards for nascent technologies.

As chairman of the FCC, Fly became the ex officio chairman of the Defense Communications Board, later the Board of War Communications, when it was created by President Franklin D. Roosevelt in September 1940.

That same month, J. Edgar Hoover of the FBI asked the FCC to wiretap all communications to and from Axis powers and the United States, despite the fact that wiretapping had been outlawed by Section 605 of the Communications Act of 1934, and Fly refused to comply. Fly wrote a letter to President Roosevelt explaining his lack of cooperation. Roosevelt renominated Fly to a new seven-year term of office beginning July 1, 1942; Fly's appointment was confirmed unanimously by the U.S. Senate on June 29 of that year.

In 1941 Sam Hobbs, U.S. Representative from Alabama, introduced a bill that would legalize wiretapping by the FBI, or any other government agency, if it was suspected that a felony was occurring. The bill was supported by Attorney General Robert H. Jackson, and seemed likely to pass, until Fly testified against the bill to Congress. Due in large part to Fly's testimony, the bill did not pass. This testimony garnered Fly national attention, and earned Roosevelt's and Hoover's disapproval. The FBI conducted wiretaps in contravention of the law, and began to collect a file on Fly. Hoover publicly attacked Fly and questioned his loyalty to the United States. In 1943, a House committee investigating the FCC accused Fly of allowing the attack on Pearl Harbor by preventing wiretap legislation.

Fly left the FCC in November 1944, and opened a private law practice in New York City. He was replaced as chairman on an interim basis by Commissioner Ewell K. Jett, and his seat was ultimately filled by the Democratic National Committee's publicity director, Paul A. Porter, who took over as chairman upon his confirmation.

== Director of the ACLU ==
Fly became director of the ACLU in 1946. One of the most celebrated cases under Fly's directorship was the case of Judith Coplon, accused of spying for the Soviet Union. The trial uncovered extensive wiretapping being conducted illegally by the FBI, and became a major embarrassment for the agency. These wiretaps included conversations between Coplon and her lawyer. The bureau then destroyed recordings before the court could hear them, violating further statutes. Coplon was convicted, but the case was appealed to the United States Court of Appeals for the Second Circuit. Judge Learned Hand conceded that "the guilt is plain," but overturned the conviction due to the evidence collected through illegal methods, as well as other misconduct, including the fact that Coplon had been arrested without a warrant.

== Private practice ==
In 1949 Fly represented labor leader Harry Bridges, who faced deportation due to accusations that he had lied when saying he had never been a Communist. This case eventually went before the U.S. Supreme Court in 1953, which ruled against the government. As retribution for this case, Fly faced numerous legal and business difficulties; newspaper columnists questioned his patriotism, and he was named a "concealed Communist" by a loyalty board

In 1953 Fly debated House Majority Leader Charles A. Halleck on the use of wiretaps, on Edward R. Murrow's "See It Now" television program. Fly also wrote numerous print editorials speaking against wiretapping, and testified before a Senate subcommittee about the practice.

Fly died of cancer in Daytona Beach, Florida.

Government offices
Preceded by Frank R. McNinch	Chairman of the Federal Communications Commission; 1939–1944	Succeeded by Ewell K. Jett
Preceded by Frank R. McNinch	Member of the Federal Communications Commission; 1939–1944	Succeeded by Paul A. Porter
