= Richard E. Wiley =

American attorney and FCC commissioner

Richard Wiley

Chair of the Federal Communications Commission
- In office March 8, 1974 – October 12, 1977
- President: Richard Nixon; Gerald Ford; Jimmy Carter
- Preceded by: Dean Burch
- Succeeded by: Charles Ferris

Personal details
- Born: July 20, 1934 (age 91) Peoria, Illinois, U.S.
- Party: Republican
- Education: Northwestern University (BA, JD); Georgetown University (LLM)

Richard E. Wiley (born July 20, 1934) is an American attorney and former government official. He served as chairman of the Federal Communications Commission (FCC) from March 8, 1974, to October 12, 1977. A member of the Republican Party, he supported increased competition and lower regulations in the communications sector.

Wiley played a pivotal role in the development of HDTV in the United States, serving from 1987 to 1995 as chairman of the FCC's Advisory Committee on Advanced Television Service.

== Early life and education ==
Wiley was born on July 20, 1934, in Peoria, Illinois. Wiley graduated with distinction from Northwestern University, where he earned BS and JD degrees. He also holds a master's degree in Law from Georgetown University Law Center and an honorary Doctor of Laws from The Catholic University of America.

== Career ==
He has served as chairman/president of The Media Institute, the Center for Telecommunication and Information at Columbia University and the Federal Bar and Federal Communication Bar Associations.

In 1983, Wiley founded the Washington, D.C., law firm Wiley Rein LLP, home to more than 275 lawyers practicing in almost two-dozen areas of law including communications, government contracts, insurance, international trade, public policy and litigation. Wiley, the firm's managing partner, leads its preeminent 80-attorney communications practice.

== Recognition ==
Wiley has often been profiled by the media and recognized for his expertise and contributions to the communications industry. He has been called the "Father of High-Definition television" (The Globe and Mail), the "most influential media and telecommunications lawyer in the United States" (the International Herald Tribune) and one of the top "100 Men of the Century" (Broadcasting & Cable). In 2002, Wiley was inducted into the Wireless Hall of Fame for his role in the industry.

Wiley is the recipient of numerous awards, including an Emmy from the Academy of Television Arts and Sciences, the Electronic Industries’ Medal of Honor, the Distinguished Service Award from the National Association of Broadcasters, the North American Broadcasters Association's International Achievement Award, an Award of Special Recognition from the Radio and Television News Directors Foundation, the Digital Pioneer's Award, Leading Communications Lawyer by Legal Times of Washington, D.C., and the Chambers USA Award for Excellence in the area of telecommunications regulatory work.

Government offices
Preceded by Dean Burch	Chair of the Federal Communications Commission; 1974–1977	Succeeded by Charles Ferris
