= Charles D. Ferris =

American lawyer (1933–2024)

Charles Ferris
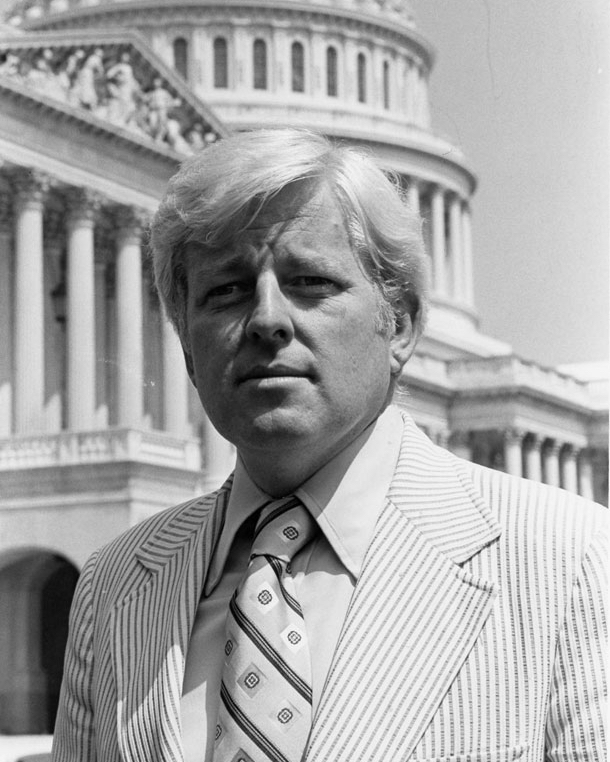

Chairman of the Federal Communications Commission
- In office October 17, 1977 – February 4, 1981
- President: Jimmy Carter; Ronald Reagan
- Preceded by: Richard E. Wiley
- Succeeded by: Robert E. Lee

Commissioner of the Federal Communications Commission
- In office October 17, 1977 – April 10, 1981
- President: Jimmy Carter; Ronald Reagan
- Preceded by: Richard E. Wiley
- Succeeded by: James H. Quello

Personal details
- Born: Charles Daniel Ferris; April 9, 1933 Boston, Massachusetts, U.S.
- Died: February 16, 2024 (aged 90)
- Party: Democratic
- Spouse: Patricia C. Brennan
- Education: Boston College (AB, JD)

Military service
- Allegiance: United States
- Branch/service: United States Navy
- Years of service: 1955–1960
- Rank: Lieutenant (junior grade)
- Unit: USS Brinkley Bass

Charles Daniel Ferris (April 9, 1933 – February 16, 2024) was an American lawyer and government official. A longtime staffer for Majority Leader Mike Mansfield on the Senate Democratic Policy Committee, he played a key role in the enactment of the Civil Rights Act of 1964, Voting Rights Act of 1965, and Lyndon Johnson's Great Society legislation.

Following Mansfield's retirement, Ferris briefly worked for House Speaker Tip O'Neill before being nominated by President Jimmy Carter to chair the Federal Communications Commission in 1977. He would serve for the remainder of Carter's term. During his tenure, the agency initiated a program of nationwide telecommunications deregulation, which was later continued during the Reagan administration.

== Early life and education ==
Ferris was born in the Dorchester neighborhood of Boston, Massachusetts to Henry Joseph and Mildred Mary (née MacDonald) Ferris. His father worked for Boston's metropolitan transit authority and his mother as a telegrapher for Western Union. He attended Boston College High School and Boston College, leaving the latter in 1954 with a Bachelor of Arts in physics. Upon graduation, he was hired by Sperry Corporation as a research physicist.

Faced with the prospect of being drafted into the United States Army, Ferris applied for Navy officer candidate school in 1954 and entered active service the following year. Eventually he attained the rank of lieutenant (junior grade) and was made chief engineer on the destroyer USS Brinkley Bass (DD-887). From 1958 to 1960 he was on assignment as an assistant professor of naval science at Harvard University, teaching celestial navigation and marine engineering to Reserve Officers' Training Corps cadets. At night, Ferris attended Boston College Law School, receiving his J.D. degree in 1961.

== Legal career ==
=== Justice Department ===
From 1961 to 1963 he was a trial attorney with the United States Department of Justice Civil Division as part of the Attorney General's honor program.

=== Legislative work ===
From 1963 to 1977 he served as associate general counsel and later general counsel to the United States Senate Democratic Policy Committee. In 1977 he served as general counsel to Speaker of the House Tip O'Neill.

=== Federal Communications Commission ===
In September 1977, President Jimmy Carter nominated Ferris to chair the Federal Communications Commission. While most scholars look the term of Reagan appointee Mark S. Fowler as the beginning of telecommunications deregulation, deregulation actually began with Ferris. The most significant effect Ferris had on the FCC was shifting the commission's reasoning from legal and technical to an economic one.

=== Private practice ===
Ferris practiced law with Mintz, Levin, Cohn, Ferris, Glovsky, and Popeo from 1981 to 2013. He retired in 2013.

== Personal life ==
Ferris was married to Patricia Ferris née Brennan, with whom he had daughters, Caroline and Sabrina.

Ferris died on February 16, 2024, at the age of 90.

Government offices
Preceded by Richard E. Wiley	Chairman of the Federal Communications Commission; 1977–1981	Succeeded by Robert E. Lee
