= Jefferson–Jackson Dinner =

Annual U.S. Democratic Party local fundraising dinners

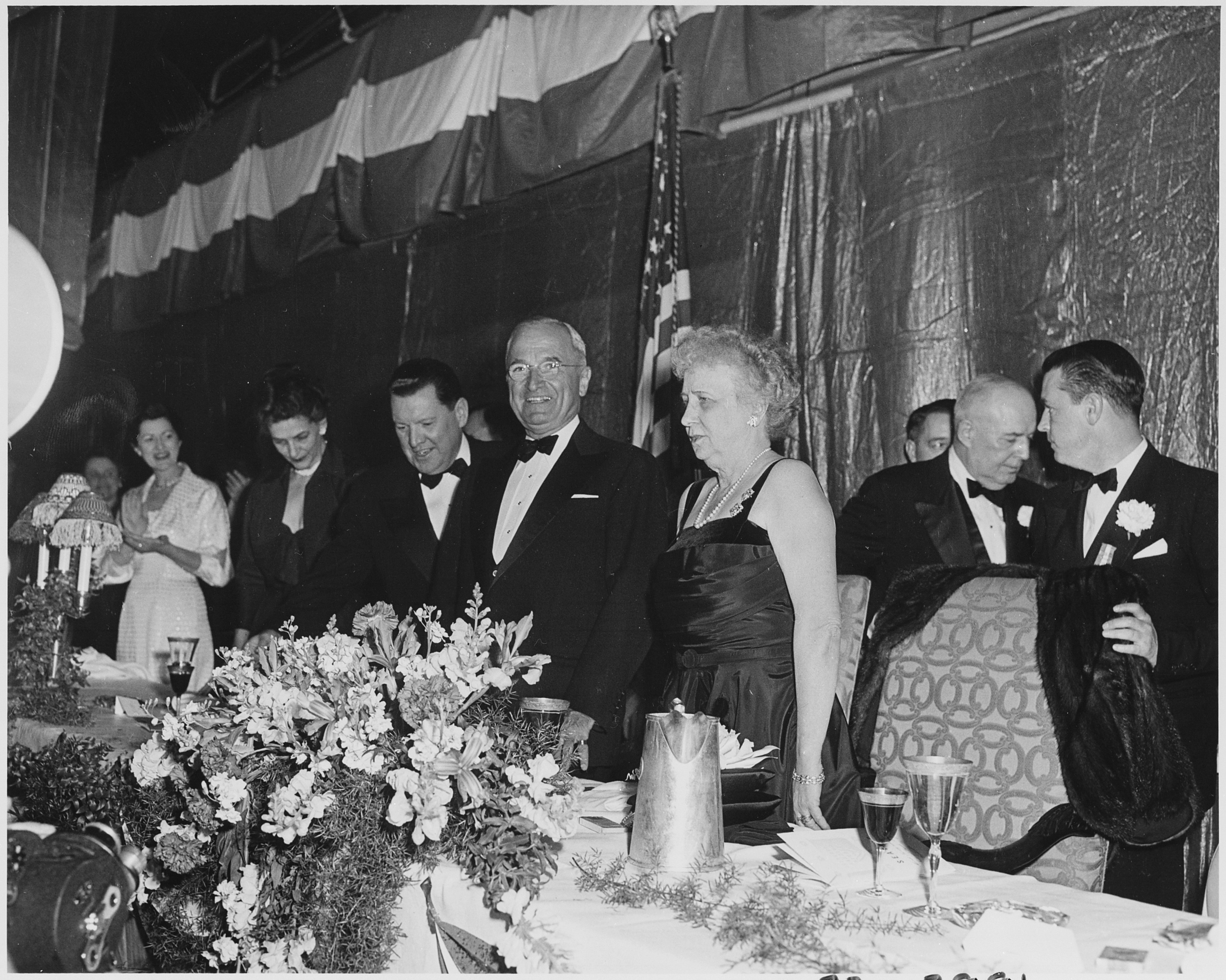
President Harry Truman and Mrs. Truman at the Jefferson-Jackson Day Dinner, 1952

A Jefferson–Jackson Dinner is a title traditionally given to an annual fundraising celebration held by Democratic Party organizations in the United States. It is named for Presidents Thomas Jefferson and Andrew Jackson, which the party traditionally calls its founders. They are usually held in February or March at a local level providing an opportunity for elected officials, candidates, party staff, advisors, and donors to attend.

The Republican Party's equivalent is usually called a Lincoln Dinner, Reagan Dinner, Lincoln–Reagan Dinner, or Lincoln–Reagan–Trump Dinner. Into the 1960s, state and local Democratic Parties across the country depended on well-attended Jefferson–Jackson Day dinners to provide their annual funding. Their financial importance has somewhat dimmed with the development of other political party funding strategies, although they still serve a function for social networking and conferences.

== Name changes ==
Due to controversies over Jefferson's slaveholding and Jackson's policy toward Native Americans while in office, some Democratic Party organizations have been removing Jefferson and Jackson from the title of party fundraisers. The flow of the State Democratic Parties seeking to change the name of their iconic Jefferson-Jackson dinner is spurred by a desire to embrace a more modern identity. The usual argument made is that while Jefferson and Jackson were both great men and for a time embodied the spirit of the Democratic Party, they now fail to represent the breadth of change that has affected the Democratic Party and its current membership.

Other names for Jefferson–Jackson Dinner's:

- Mississippi: Jefferson–Jackson–Hamer celebration (2012–2017) and Hamer-Winter Dinner (since 2018)
- Florida: Leadership Blue
- Colorado: Obama Dinner (since 2017)
- Missouri: Truman Dinner
- Georgia: Carter-Lewis Dinner
- Iowa: Liberty and Justice Celebration (since 2015)
- Nebraska: Morrison Exon Dinner (formerly) and Ben Nelson Gala
- Indiana: Hoosier Hospitality Dinner (since 2016)
- Minnesota: Humphrey-Mondale Dinner (since 2012)
- Virginia: Blue Commonwealth Gala (since 2018)
- North Carolina: Unity Dinner (since 2017)
- Texas: Johnson-Jordan Dinner (since 2014)
- Louisiana: True Blue Gala (since 2017)
- Arkansas: Clinton Day Dinner

The Republican party has similarly moved away from "Lincoln Dinners" due to American political realignment since the 1960s, especially in the Southern United States where culturally conservative White Southerners now tend to be Republicans, while Black voters now tend to be Democrats.

== See also ==
- Lincoln Dinner
- History of the Democratic Party (United States)
