= E. K. Jett =

FCC engineer, commissioner; WMAR vice-president

Ewell Kirk Jett

Chairman of the Federal Communications Commission Acting
- In office November 16, 1944 – December 20, 1944
- President: Franklin D. Roosevelt
- Preceded by: James Lawrence Fly
- Succeeded by: Paul A. Porter

Personal details
- Born: March 20, 1893 Baltimore, Maryland
- Died: April 28, 1965 (aged 72) Bethesda, Maryland
- Party: Independent

Military service
- Branch/service: United States Navy
- Years of service: 1911–1929

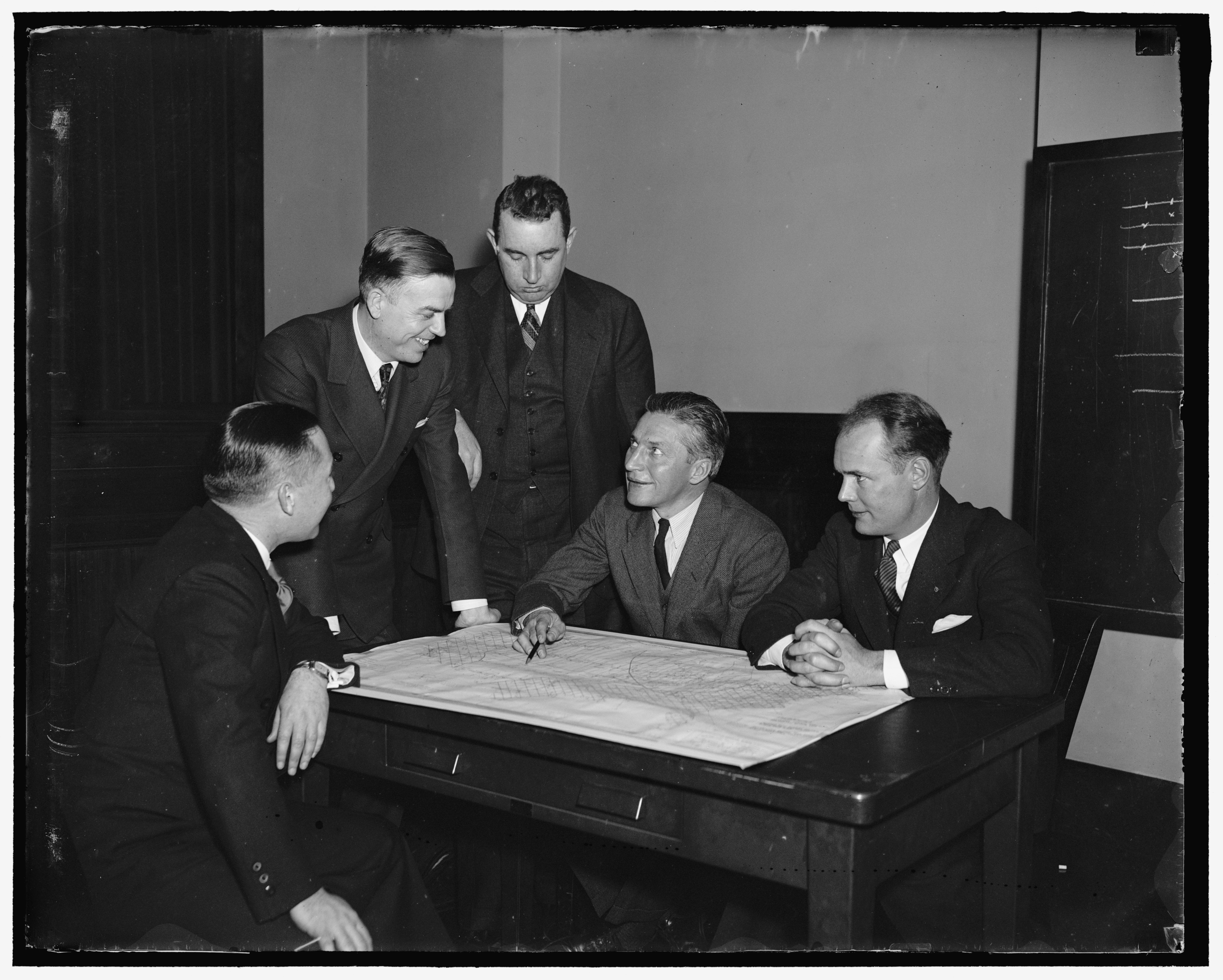
E.K. Jett and four aviation leaders discuss the use of radio technology to improve air safety, at the February, 1937, Air Safety Conference in Washington. Jett is second from left.

Lt. Ewell Kirk "Jack" Jett, USN (March 20, 1893 – April 28, 1965) was chief engineer and later a commissioner of the Federal Communications Commission (FCC) of the United States in the late 1930s and 1940s, serving briefly as the Commission's chairman. He later managed Baltimore television station WMAR.

== Military career ==
Jett enlisted in the U.S. Navy on June 8, 1911, under the name of John Raymond Smith of Lancaster, Virginia. He was sent to the Naval radio school at the Brooklyn Navy Yard; upon completing the course with high marks, he was appointed Electrician, 3rd class (Radio) in late 1912. He reenlisted in 1915, under his own name, rising to Chief Electrician (Radio) by 1917. He served at the Naval radio station NAA in Arlington, Virginia, in 1916, and on the USS Seattle, Sylph, and Michigan, among others, receiving the Mexican Service Medal in 1919 for his service on the Michigan. He was promoted to warrant officer as a Gunner (Radio) in late 1917.

After the First World War ended, Congress quickly made significant reductions in the size of the military. While most men were simply discharged at the end of their term of enlistment, Congress provided for some sailors with specialized skills to transfer to the permanent Navy as officers. Jett was promoted to ensign in 1921. When Commander T.A.M. Craven was seconded to the Federal Radio Commission in 1929, he brought Jett, by then a lieutenant, along as his assistant; Jett remained with the Radio Commission when he retired from the Navy later that year. Jett became assistant chief engineer responsible for non-broadcast radio services (e.g., common-carrier wireless communications) under Craven in 1931.

== FCC career ==
When the Federal Radio Commission was replaced by the Federal Communications Commission under the Communications Act of 1934, the FRC's professional staff was carried over into the new organization, and in 1937, when Craven was appointed by President Franklin D. Roosevelt to join the Commission proper, Jett was promoted to the chief engineer's post. In 1938, Jett served as a director of the Institute of Radio Engineers. He served on the U.S. delegation to numerous international radio conferences, including the 1937 Inter-American Radio Conference in Havana, at which the North American Regional Broadcasting Agreement was negotiated.

When Commissioner George H. Payne's term expired on June 30, 1943, Roosevelt initially renominated Payne for another seven-year term. However, for reasons unknown, Roosevelt withdrew Payne's nomination the following day. At the time, investigations of the FCC were going on in both the House and the Senate, and there was strong sentiment in both bodies to restructure the FCC in some way. Roosevelt eventually nominated Jett to replace Payne on January 12, 1944. There was immediate controversy, however, as some Republican senators felt that Jett was too closely associated with the FCC's Democratic chairman, James Lawrence Fly. Payne was a Republican, and under the Communications Act of 1934, not more than four of the then seven-member commission may be affiliated with the same political party; Jett had never voted, and testified before the Senate Interstate Commerce Committee that he had never supported any political party.

Jett was confirmed unanimously on February 11, 1944, and sworn in four days later; George P. Adair was promoted to take Jett's place as the FCC's chief engineer. Jett briefly served as interim chairman of the commission from November 16 to December 20, 1944, between Fly's resignation and the confirmation of Fly's successor, Paul A. Porter. (The chairmanship of the FCC is determined by direct appointment of the president from among the sitting commissioners.) According to Broadcasting, he was known as the technical expert on the commission at this time, and also as the "father of two-way radios in police cars." Jett did not serve out his full seven-year term, leaving the commission 3 1/2 years later, on December 31, 1947; he was replaced by George E. Sterling.

== Later life and death ==
Jett resigned from the FCC to become vice-president of A. S. Abell Company, publisher of The Baltimore Sun and then licensee of WMAR radio and television. He remained with WMAR until his death in 1965, at age 70. He died at Bethesda Naval Hospital after a long illness, and was buried at Arlington National Cemetery. He was survived by his wife Viola and their two daughters.

Government offices
Preceded by James Lawrence Fly	Chairman of the Federal Communications Commission; 1944	Succeeded by Paul A. Porter
