= Wayne Coy =

American FCC official (1903–1957)

Chairman of the Federal Communications Commission
- In office December 29, 1947 – February 21, 1952
- President: Harry S. Truman
- Preceded by: Paul A. Walker
- Succeeded by: Paul A. Walker

Personal details
- Born: Albert Wayne Coy; November 23, 1903
- Died: September 24, 1957 (aged 53)
- Party: Democratic

Albert Wayne Coy (November 23, 1903 – September 24, 1957) served as chairman of the Federal Communications Commission from December 29, 1947, to February 21, 1952.

During World War II, he served as a Liaison Officer for the Office for Emergency Management, and as a special assistant to President Franklin Delano Roosevelt.

Government offices
Preceded by Rosel H. Hyde	Chairman of the Federal Communications Commission; December 1947–February 1952	Succeeded by Paul Atlee Walker
