= E. William Henry =

American politician (1929–2022)

Chairman of the Federal Communications Commission
- In office June 2, 1963 – May 1, 1966
- President: John F. Kennedy; Lyndon B. Johnson
- Preceded by: Newton Minow
- Succeeded by: Rosel Hyde

Personal details
- Born: March 4, 1929 Memphis, Tennessee, U.S.
- Died: January 31, 2022 (aged 92)
- Party: Democratic
- Spouse: Sherrye Eileen Patton (m. 1955)
- Children: 3, including Emil Henry
- Parents: Dr. John Philips Henry (father); Elizabeth Tschudy (mother)
- Education: Vanderbilt University Law School

Emil William Henry (March 4, 1929 – January 31, 2022) served as chairman of the Federal Communications Commission from June 2, 1963, to May 1, 1966, as a self-described Kennedy Democrat.

== Early life and education ==
Henry attended local elementary schools. Attended The Hill School, graduated Cum Laude in 1947, then enrolled in Yale University graduated with BA degree. Henry became interested in broadcast radio working on the Yale radio station WYBC.

== Navy commission ==
After college Henry entered the US Navy in 1951 in Officer candidate school(OCS), receiving a commission as an ensign in Navy reserve. Henry as assigned to the destroyer USS Bausell. For the next three years Henry was the ship's Gunnery officer. He was discharged in 1954 with a rank of Lieutenant (junior grade) (LTJG)

== Law school ==
Henry graduated from Vanderbuilt University Law school in 1954

Government offices
Preceded by Newton N. Minow	Chairman of the Federal Communications Commission; June 1963 – May 1966	Succeeded by Rosel H. Hyde
