= Robert E. Lee (FCC) =

Commissioner of the Federal Communications Commission (1912–1993)

Commissioner of the Federal Communications Commission
- In office October 6, 1953 – June 30, 1981
- President: Dwight D. Eisenhower; John F. Kennedy; Lyndon B. Johnson; Richard Nixon; Gerald Ford; Jimmy Carter; Ronald Reagan

Chairman of the Federal Communications Commission
- In office April 13, 1981 – May 18, 1981
- President: Ronald Reagan
- Preceded by: Charles Ferris
- Succeeded by: Mark Fowler

Personal details
- Born: Robert Emmet Lee; March 31, 1912 Chicago, Illinois, U.S.
- Died: April 5, 1993 (aged 81) Arlington County, Virginia, U.S.
- Party: Republican

Robert Emmet Lee (March 31, 1912 – April 5, 1993) was an American government official, best known as commissioner of the Federal Communications Commission from 1953 to 1981, including interim FCC chairman (February 5, 1981 – April 12, 1981) and chairman (April 13, 1981 – May 18, 1981).

== Background ==
Robert Emmet Lee was born on March 31, 1912, in Chicago to a family of Irish immigrants. He had at least one sibling, a brother Edward. In the 1920s, He attended St. Vincent's Grammar School. In 1935, he graduated from DePaul University's College of Commerce and Law.

== Career ==
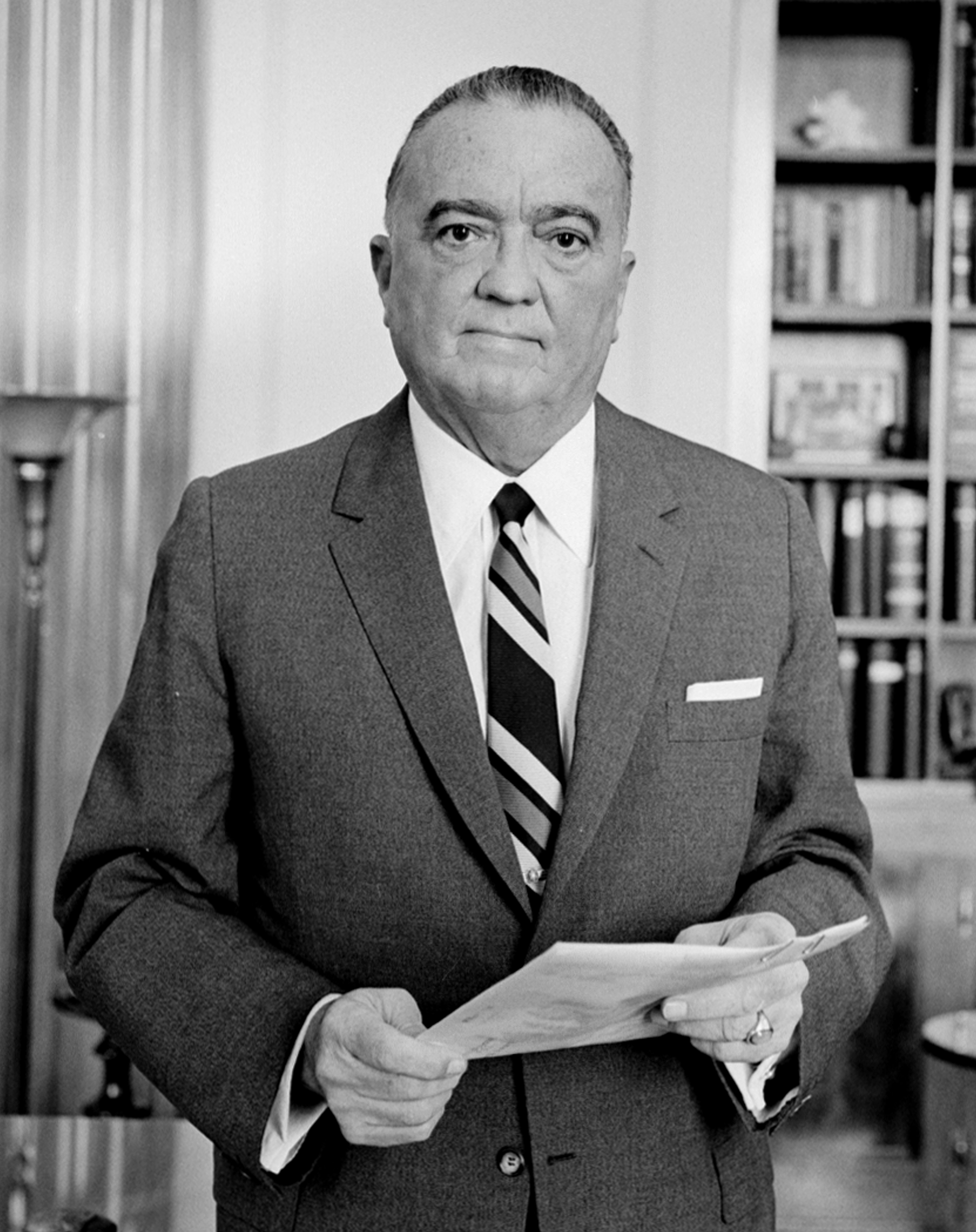
J. Edgar Hoover, under whom Lee worked directly (1941-1946)

In 1932, while still a student, Lee began his career as a night clerk and auditor at the Congress Hotel in Chicago. In 1933, he had become assistant auditor at the Great Northern Hotel in Chicago. In 1935, he became auditor of the Roosevelt Hotel in St. Louis, Missouri. Later that year, he became auditor of the American Bond and Mortgage Company Bondholders Protective Committee.

In 1938 through 1941, Lee served as a special agent of the Federal Bureau of Investigation and worked in Washington, Newark, New York City, and Chicago. From 1941 to 1946, he became a chief FBI clerk and then administrative assistant to J. Edgar Hoover.

In 1946 through 1953, Lee became director of Surveys and Investigations on the U.S. House Appropriations Committee.

=== Lee List ===
In the Fall of 1947, Lee (a Republican now working in the Republican-dominated 80th United States Congress) discovered and examined security files for 108 suspect cases, which resulted in the "Lee List" used by a congressional subcommittee. (Historian John Earl Haynes has stated, "Robert E. Lee was the committee's lead investigator and supervised preparation of the list." Haynes has also compiled a comparison between the Lee and other lists of communists used by McCarthy, available online.) During a congressional hearing on March 10, 1948, Assistant Secretary of State John E. Peurifoy claimed the number had dropped from 108 to 57 names.

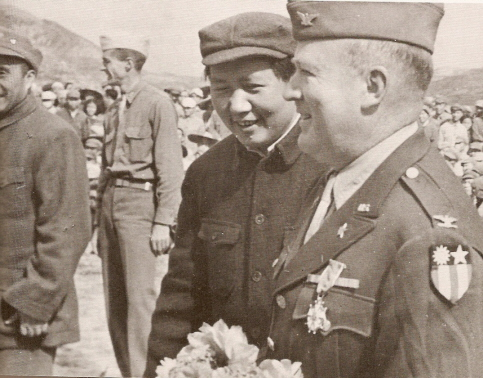
U.S. Colonel David D. Barrett with Mao Zedong during the Dixie Mission (1944–1947), formed the background to which the "Lee List" also contributed

The Dixie Mission (July 22, 1944 – March 11, 1947), was the first U.S. effort to establish official relations with the Chinese Communist Party. Domestic suspicion about China Hands undermined mission members such as State Department official John S. Service (who, in an August 3, 1944, report The Communist Policy Towards the Kuomintang stated "impressive personal qualities of the Communist leaders, their seeming sincerity, and the coherence and logical nature of their program leads me, at least, toward general acceptance of the first explanation – that the Communists base their policy toward the Kuomintang on a real desire for democracy in China under which there can be orderly economic growth through a stage of private enterprise to eventual socialism without the need of violent social upheaval and revolution."). Service was implicated in the "Amerasia Affair" espionage investigations of 1945–1946. In November 1944, U.S. General Joseph Stilwell was recalled from China amidst controversy about American support for nationalist and communist Chinese forces that made the cover of TIME magazine. In 1946, a House Judiciary subcommittee chaired by Rep. Samuel F. Hobbs (followed in 1950 by the Senate Foreign Relations Subcommittee on the Investigation of Loyalty of State Department Employees, commonly known as the Tydings Committee) investigated the Amerasia case. "Thus, by 1946, "members of both parties and both houses were focused on the security shop at Satate, albeit from different angles, by the latter part of 1946." Fueling debate was the best-selling book Thunder Out of China by former TIME magazine correspondent Theodore White and Annalee Jacoby. During 1946, Congress attached a "McCarran Rider" to appropriations for the State Department: it empowered the U.S. Secretary of State to fire summarily anyone deemed "necessary or advisable in the interests of the United States."

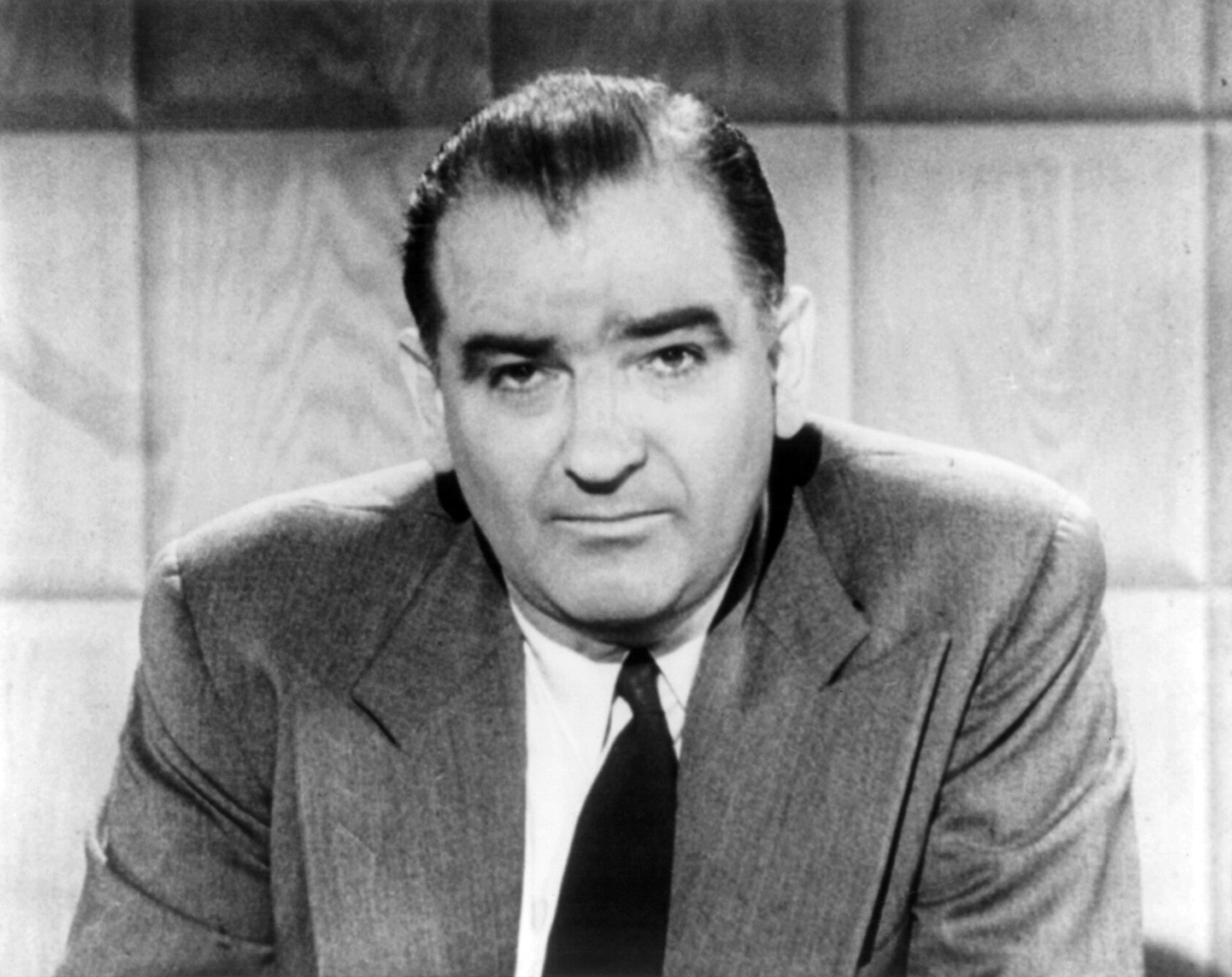
U.S. Senator Joseph McCarthy was a personal friend of Lee's

On February 9, 1950, Senator McCarthy gave a Lincoln Day "Enemies Within" speech to the Republican Women's Club of Wheeling, West Virginia. His words in the speech are a matter of some debate, as no audio recording was saved. However, it is generally agreed that he produced a piece of paper that he claimed contained a list of known Communists working for the State Department. McCarthy is usually quoted to have said: "The State Department is infested with communists. I have here in my hand a list of 205—a list of names that were made known to the Secretary of State as being members of the Communist Party and who nevertheless are still working and shaping policy in the State Department." There is some dispute about whether or not McCarthy actually gave the number of people on the list as being "205" or "57". In a later telegram to President Truman, and when entering the speech into the Congressional Record, he used the number "57."

=== FCC commissioner ===
In 1953, U.S. president Dwight D. Eisenhower appointed Lee commission to the new Federal Communications Commission, where he served for nearly 28 years to 1981. Lee was a personal friend of U.S. Senator Joseph McCarthy and so faced some opposition in the American press when Eisenhower appointed him FCC commissioner. Subsequent presidents Lyndon Baines Johnson, Richard Nixon, and Ronald Reagan re-appointed him. In his final year, he served briefly as interim chairman (February 5, 1981 – April 12, 1981) and chairman (April 13, 1981 – May 18, 1981).

While in office, he served as vice chairman or chairman on a number of U.S. delegations to Geneva: Space Conference (1971), Telephone and Telegraph Conference (1973), World Administrative Radio Conference (1974), World Administrative Radio Conference for Broadcast Satellites (1977). In October 1979, he was a U.S. delegate to an International Conference on Satellite Communication in Dublin, Ireland. In March 1980, he chaired a U.S. delegation, Inter-American Telecommunication Conference in Buenos Aires, Argentina.

In the 1980s, Lee served as consultant on telecommunications for law firm of Fletcher, Heald & Hildreth, which specialized in telecommunications. In 1983, he was a delegate to the Geneva World Administrative Conference on Broadcast Satellites.

== Personal and death ==
In July 1936, Lee married Wilma "Rex" Rector; she died in 1971. On September 27, 1974, he married Rose Anne Bente. Lee had three children: Patricia Lee, Robert Edward Lee, and Michael Lee.

Lee died age 81 on April 5, 1993, of liver cancer in Arlington, Virginia. At time of death, he was the longest-serving FCC commissioner.

== Legacy ==
Lee championed ultrahigh-frequency television (UHF), RCA Corporation's system for color broadcasting, educational television, pay or subscription television, and expanding FM radio.

Lee's 1996 autobiography, In the Public Interest, was co-authored with John Shosky.

His papers were donated by his widow to the Dwight D. Eisenhower Library in 1998.

Government offices
Preceded by Charles D. Ferris	Chairman of the Federal Communications Commission; April 1981 May1981	Succeeded by Mark S. Fowler

Government offices
Preceded by Charles D. Ferris	Chairman of the Federal Communications Commission; February 1981–May 1981	Succeeded by Mark S. Fowler
