= T. A. M. Craven =

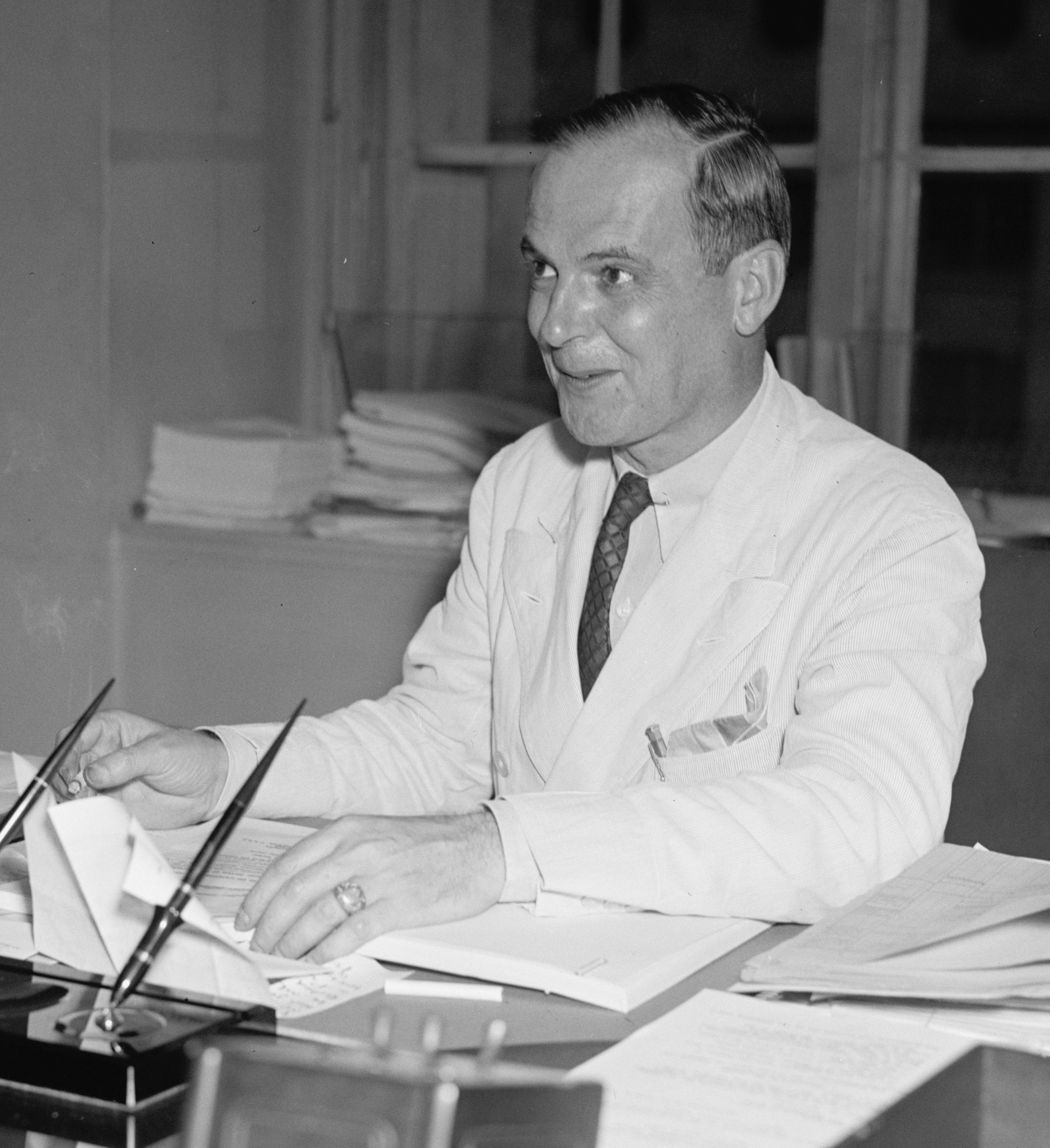

Commissioner of the Federal Communications Commission
- In office August 25, 1937 - June 30, 1944
- President: Franklin D. Roosevelt
- In office July 2, 1956 - March 25, 1963
- President: Dwight D. Eisenhower; John F. Kennedy

Personal details
- Born: January 31, 1893; Philadelphia, Pennsylvania, US
- Died: May 31, 1972 (aged 79); Mclean, Virginia, US
- Political party: Democratic

Tunis Augustus Macdonough Craven (January 31, 1893 – May 31, 1972) (known by his initials T.A.M.) was a United States Navy officer in the first half of the 20th century involved in the development of radio and communications.

== Early life ==
Born in Philadelphia, Pennsylvania, Craven was given the name of the Union U.S. Navy Commander Tunis Augustus Macdonough Craven (January 11, 1813 to August 5, 1864) who famously went down with his ship, the USS Tecumseh, during the American Civil War at the Battle of Mobile Bay.

== Military career ==
The younger Craven graduated from the United States Naval Academy in 1913. He was a Navy engineer involved in the early history of radio and a close friend of Stanford C. Hooper. His first cruise was aboard the USS Delaware, a battleship in the Atlantic Fleet, where he served as the radio officer, moving in 1915 to the staff of the Commander in Chief, U.S. Asiatic Fleet as the fleet radio officer and fleet intelligence officer. In 1917 he was ordered to the Office of Director of Naval Communications, where he oversaw the organization and operation of the Navy's trans-Atlantic radio communications system during the war. In 1927 he served as a technical adviser to the U.S. delegation to Washington international communications conference, and subsequently served as executive officer aboard the oil tanker USS Sapelo. He resigned from active duty in 1930, immediately taking a reserve commission. He remained a commander in the reserves until 1944.

== Federal Communications Commission ==
Craven served as Chief Engineer to the Federal Communications Commission between 1935 and 1937 before being appointed to the commission by President Franklin D. Roosevelt in 1937 (serving from 25 August 1937 to 30 June 1944). A Democrat by party, he was frequently at odds with chairman (and fellow Democrat) James Lawrence Fly. He declined reappointment at the end of his term in 1944, choosing instead to return to private industry as the vice-president of Iowa Broadcasting Company, owned by the Cowles interests. After a long delay, FCC general counsel Charles R. Denny was nominated to succeed Craven in March, 1945. Craven was appointed to an unusual (and so far unique) second appointment by President Dwight D. Eisenhower from 2 July 1956 to 25 March 1963. he died in 1972 at 79.
