= Paul A. Walker (FCC chairman) =

American politician

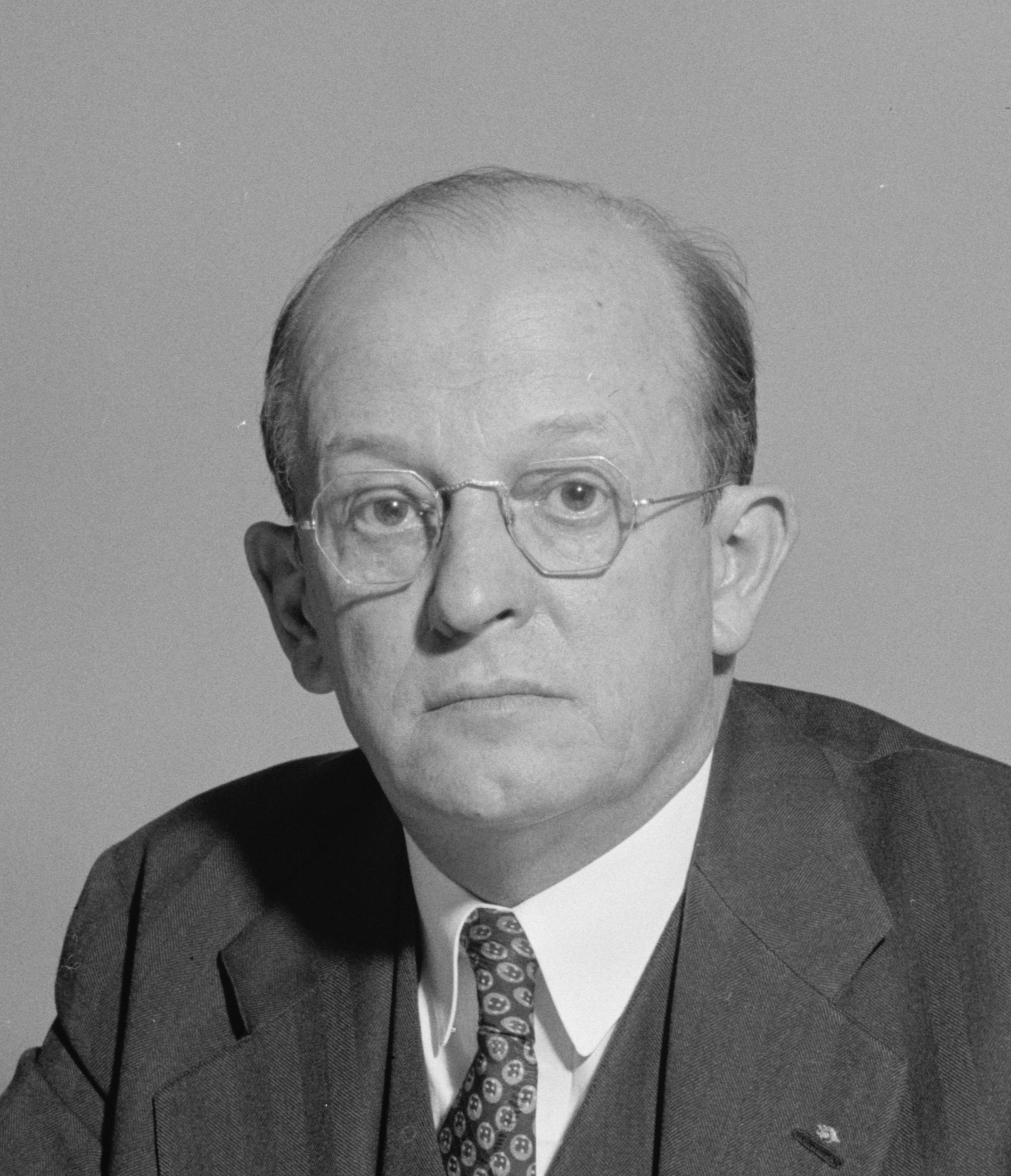

Chairman of the Federal Communications Commission
- In office February 28, 1952 – April 17, 1953
- President: Dwight D. Eisenhower
- Preceded by: Wayne Coy
- Succeeded by: Rosel Hyde

Chairman of the Federal Communications Commission Acting
- In office November 3, 1947 – December 28, 1947
- President: Harry S. Truman
- Preceded by: Charles Denney
- Succeeded by: Wayne Coy

Personal details
- Born: Paul Atlee Walker; January 11, 1881
- Died: November 2, 1965 (aged 84)
- Party: Democratic

Paul Atlee Walker Sr. (January 11, 1881 – November 2, 1965) served as Chairman of the Federal Communications Commission from November 3, 1947, to December 28, 1947 (Acting), and again from February 28, 1952, to April 17, 1953.

Government offices
Preceded by Wayne Coy	Chairman of the Federal Communications Commission; February 1952–April 1953	Succeeded by Rosel H. Hyde
