= Mark S. Fowler =

Chairman of the FCC from 1981–1987

Chairman of the Federal Communications Commission
- In office May 18, 1981 – April 17, 1987
- President: Ronald Reagan
- Preceded by: Robert E. Lee
- Succeeded by: Dennis R. Patrick

Personal details
- Born: October 6, 1941 (age 85) Toronto, Ontario, Canada
- Party: Republican
- Education: University of Florida (BA,JD)
- Profession: Businessman lawyer reporter

Mark S. Fowler (born October 6, 1941) served as chairman of the Federal Communications Commission from May 18, 1981 to April 17, 1987. Appointed by Ronald Reagan, he led the repeal of the Fairness Doctrine and spearheaded the deregulatory trend in telecommunications policy, and was a proponent of deregulation of television stations, and radio ownership laws.

Fowler was born in Toronto, Ontario, Canada. He received both his Bachelor's degree and Juris Doctor from the University of Florida.

== FCC Chairman ==
Under his tenure, the FCC underwent a pattern of deregulation. In June 1984, the commission lifted a guideline that set the maximum amount of commercials on television to 16 minutes. The next month, the cap of how many Radio or TV Stations a corporation could own was raised from seven to twelve.

== Career after the FCC ==
Fowler was a communications counsel at the law firm of Latham & Watkins LLP from 1987 until 2000 FCC. He was a VP at Bell South while forming his own international phone company Power Fon, which was bought out by a large phone carrier. From 1990 to 1993 Mr. Fowler also served on the board of directors for Eon Corporation, then doing business as TV Answer. TV Answer was one of the first companies to work with the FCC to explore the use of narrow band radio-wave frequencies for interactive television—where programmers and their viewers could communicate back and forth through a small device attached to a television set. He has been a director of Beasley Broadcast Group, Inc. since February 2000. From 2006–8, his compensation as director was close to $50,000 annually; in 2009 it fell to about $20,000. He served as a director of TalkAmerica, Inc., a publicly held company until the company was sold in December 2006. Mr. Fowler also served as chairman of AssureSat, Inc., a satellite services provider that he co-founded in 1997 until the company was dissolved in December 2004.
