= John C. Doerfer =

Former FCC commissioner and chairman

John Doerfer

Chairman of the Federal Communications Commission
- In office July 1, 1957 – March 10, 1960
- President: Dwight D. Eisenhower
- Preceded by: George McConnaughey
- Succeeded by: Frederick Ford

Personal details
- Born: November 30, 1904 Milwaukee, Wisconsin
- Died: June 5, 1992 (aged 87) Boston, Massachusetts
- Party: Republican

John C. Doerfer (November 30, 1904 – June 5, 1992) served as Chairman of the Federal Communications Commission from July 1, 1957 to March 10, 1960 as a Republican.

== Early life ==
Prior to his chairmanship of the FCC, Doerfer was the city attorney for West Allis, Wisconsin. He served on Milwaukee Mayor Frank P. Zeidler's Metropolitan Transportation Committee. In 1950, he became chairman of the Public Service Commission of Wisconsin, the state agency that oversees public utilities.

== Tenure at the FCC ==
In 1957, Doerfer was appointed to head the Federal Communications Commission by President Dwight Eisenhower. A short time into his term he came under suspicion for accepting trips and other gifts from the broadcasters he was supposed to regulate. The eruption of the 1950s quiz show scandals concerning the rigging of T.V. game show answers that brought widespread criticism for Doerfer and the F.C.C. for their failure to properly police these programs. In March 1960, an investigation by House Oversight Subcommittee revealed that Doerfer and his wife were taken as a guest to Florida and entertained by George B. Storer, president of Storer Communications, on his luxury yacht. In the wake of these revelations he was asked to resign, which he did on March 14, 1960.

Government offices
Preceded by George McConnaughey	Chairman of the Federal Communications Commission; July 1957 – March 1960	Succeeded by Frederick W. Ford
