= Lincoln Dinner =

Annual U.S. Republican Party local fundraising dinners

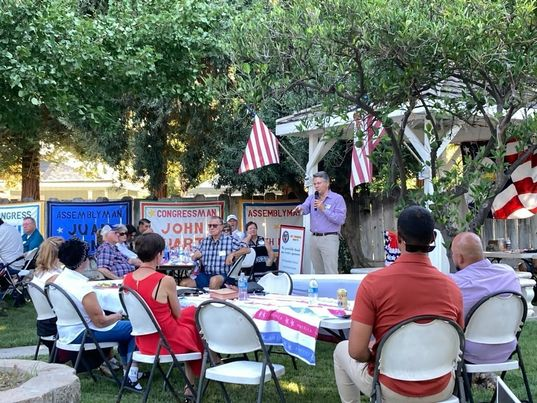
Stanislaus GOP Lincoln Day Dinner; the speaker is Congressman John Duarte

A Lincoln Dinner (sometimes called Lincoln Day Dinner) is an annual celebration of the Republican Party and a fundraising event for Republican Party affiliated organizations at the county level. Traditionally, it is held in February or March depending on the county, and sometimes on Lincoln's Birthday (February 12), although it can be held on any day. It will generally feature a notable person as a speaker. Its counterpart in the Democratic Party is the annual Jefferson–Jackson Dinner.

The event is named after Abraham Lincoln, the first elected president of the Republican Party who helped found and shape the party. Subsequent to the election of Ronald Reagan (1980), the most popular Republican president since Lincoln, some counties renamed the dinner after Reagan or have added his name to it, resulting in the names Reagan Dinner, Reagan Day Dinner, Lincoln–Reagan Dinner, etc. In particular, this trend is common in the Southern United States, where the Republican Party essentially absorbed what had previously been the Democratic Party's constituency in a process which began in the 1940s and then lasted through the 1990s (most of this process occurred during the 1960s, when White Southerners who had previously been Democrats began to abandon the party, especially in national elections, because of misgivings about the Democratic Party's increased support for African-American civil rights), resulting in the present situation that most of those White Southerners suspicious or disapproving of President Lincoln and sympathetic to the Confederacy have switched from being Democrats to Republicans. Commenting on this difference in 2005, Senator Lindsey Graham of South Carolina joked, "We don't do Lincoln Day Dinners in South Carolina. It's nothing personal, but it takes a while to get over things," referencing the fact that Lincoln's election led to the secession of South Carolina and other states, which caused the American Civil War. Following the defeat of Republican president Donald Trump in the 2020 presidential election, some counties added his name to the dinner, resulting in the names Lincoln–Reagan–Trump Dinner, Trump–Reagan Dinner, Lincoln & Trump Dinner, etc.

== See also ==
- Jefferson–Jackson Dinner
- History of the Republican Party (United States)
