= Rosel H. Hyde =

American politician

Rosel Hyde
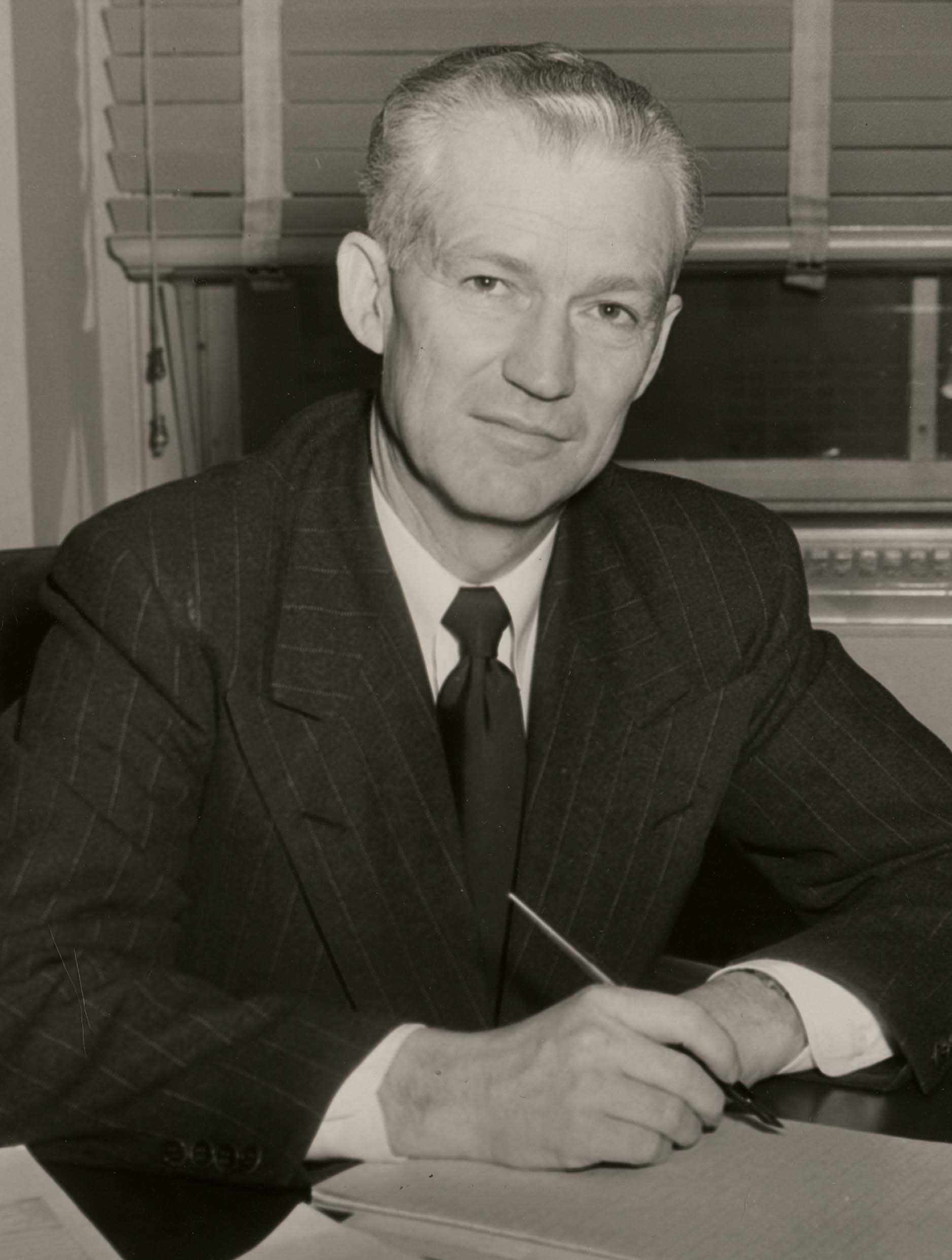

Chairman of the Federal Communications Commission
- In office April 18, 1953 – October 3, 1954
- President: Dwight D. Eisenhower
- Preceded by: Paul Walker
- Succeeded by: George McConnaughey
- In office June 27, 1966 – October 31, 1969
- President: Lyndon B. Johnson; Richard Nixon
- Preceded by: E. William Henry
- Succeeded by: Dean Burch

Personal details
- Born: April 12, 1900 Downey, Idaho, U.S.
- Died: December 19, 1992 (aged 92) Bethesda Retirement and Nursing Center, Chevy Chase, Maryland, U.S.
- Party: Republican
- Education: Utah State University; George Washington University

Rosel H. Hyde (April 12, 1900 – December 19, 1992) served as chairman of the Federal Communications Commission (FCC) twice under the four different presidents. He was chairman from April 18, 1953, to October 3, 1954, and again from June 27, 1966, to October 31, 1969. He was also acting chairman from April 19, 1954 to October 3, 1954 and again from May 1, 1966 to June 26, 1966. He was the first chairman of the FCC to be reappointed and was also the first chairman to be appointed by a president of a different political party.

== Early life and education ==
A native of Downey, Idaho, he grew up in a Mormon family and a predominately Mormon community. He graduated from Utah Agricultural College (now Utah State University) and then George Washington University Law School.

While in law school, Hyde worked as a clerk-typist for the United States Civil Service Commission. In 1924, Hyde began working for the government as a member of the United States Civil Service Commission. He then worked for the Office of Public Buildings and Parks from 1925–28. In 1928 he joined the Federal Radio Commission (FRC), which became the FCC in 1934, and was their first disbursement officer.

== Career at the FCC ==
During his time in the FCC, Hyde passed the bar and then took on the role of associate attorney, attorney, attorney examiner (administrative law judge), senior attorney, principal attorney, assistant general council, and finally became general counsel.

When Franklin D. Roosevelt became President, he put a fellow Democrat in Hyde's place. The new administration could not legally fire Hyde solely due to his political affiliation as a Republican so he remained at the FCC, but was demoted to the position of assistant attorney. This demotion only lasted about a year because a few months later he became the senior examiner. By 1945, he was reinstated as general counsel of the FCC.

In 1944, Hyde was running for commissioner, but because it would have been difficult to fill what had previously been a Democratic position, he instead ran for a commissioner position that was previously filled by a Republican. Initially William H. Wills, a Republican, was appointed to the position, but less than a year later he died and Hyde's name was recommended to President Harry S. Truman. Soon after, Hyde was appointed to the position.

In 1948, Hyde imposed a freeze on all television station applications in order to prepare a national allocation plan to reduce interference on the air waves. Because of the freeze, there were only 108 television stations for the next four years. This caused television companies and the public to become increasingly frustrated. Finally in 1952, the freeze ended because of the Sixth Report and Order.

Hyde's fellow commissioners appointed him to the position of vice chairman in 1952; he was the first to hold this title. Because Paul Walker, the chairman at the time, was getting older, the other commissioners decided that Walker would need some extra assistance. President Truman reappointed Hyde as a commissioner for another seven-year term. He served most of this term under Republican President Dwight D. Eisenhower. Although Hyde was a Republican as was Eisenhower, he was given a one-year trial period as commissioner because he had been under a Democratic administration for so long and the new administration was unsure of whether or not Hyde would be open to change under the new administration.

His reappointment as chairman by President Lyndon B. Johnson, a Democrat, was the first time that a chairman of the commission was reappointed to the position and it was also the first time a president named a chairman from a different political party.

On June 23, 1959, Hyde was sworn in for his third consecutive term. Over the years, he was the chairman of several U.S. delegations and took part in multiple conferences with other countries including Mexico and Switzerland.

During Hyde's time as commissioner many rules were made to control how television stations functioned. One example is the requirement that cigarette commercials and anti-smoking announcements had the same amount of air time. Around this time, cable television became a competitor to free broadcasting as a result of decisions made by the commission.

Hyde retired on June 30, 1969, during the presidency of Richard Nixon and joined the Washington law firm of Wilkinson, Cragun & Barker (later Wilkinson, Barker, Knauer & Quinn) as a partner.

== Awards ==
In 1965, Hyde received a gold medal citation from the International Radio and Television Society after a unanimous vote by the society's board of governors. In his gold medal citation it was said that he was one of the main contributors to the success of television becoming a nationwide service. During his first 19 months as chairman, he nearly tripled the number of television stations on air.

== Personal life ==
Hyde married Mary Henderson in June 1924. They had four children and were both active members of the Church of Jesus Christ of Latter-day Saints. he died in 1992

Government offices
Preceded by E. William Henry	Chairman of the Federal Communications Commission; May 1966 – October 1969	Succeeded by Dean Burch
Preceded by Paul Atlee Walker	Chairman of the Federal Communications Commission; April 1953 – October 1954	Succeeded by George McConnaughey
