= Suspension of Jimmy Kimmel Live! =

2025 suspension of an American talk show

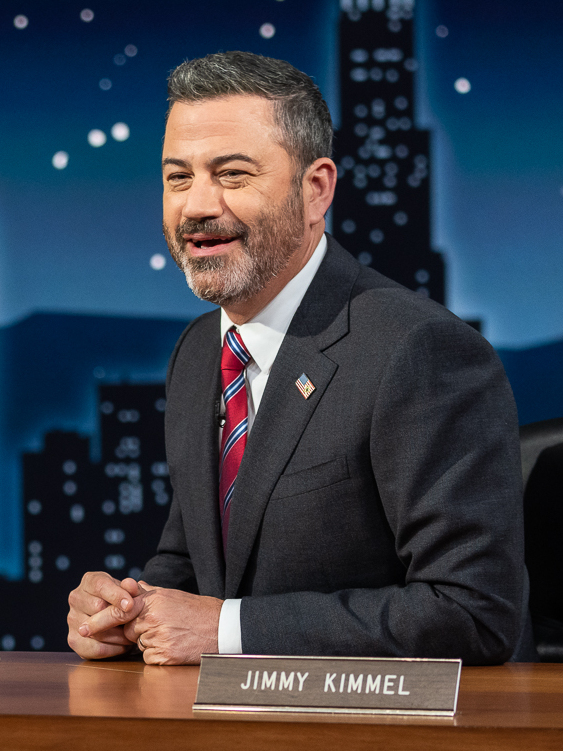
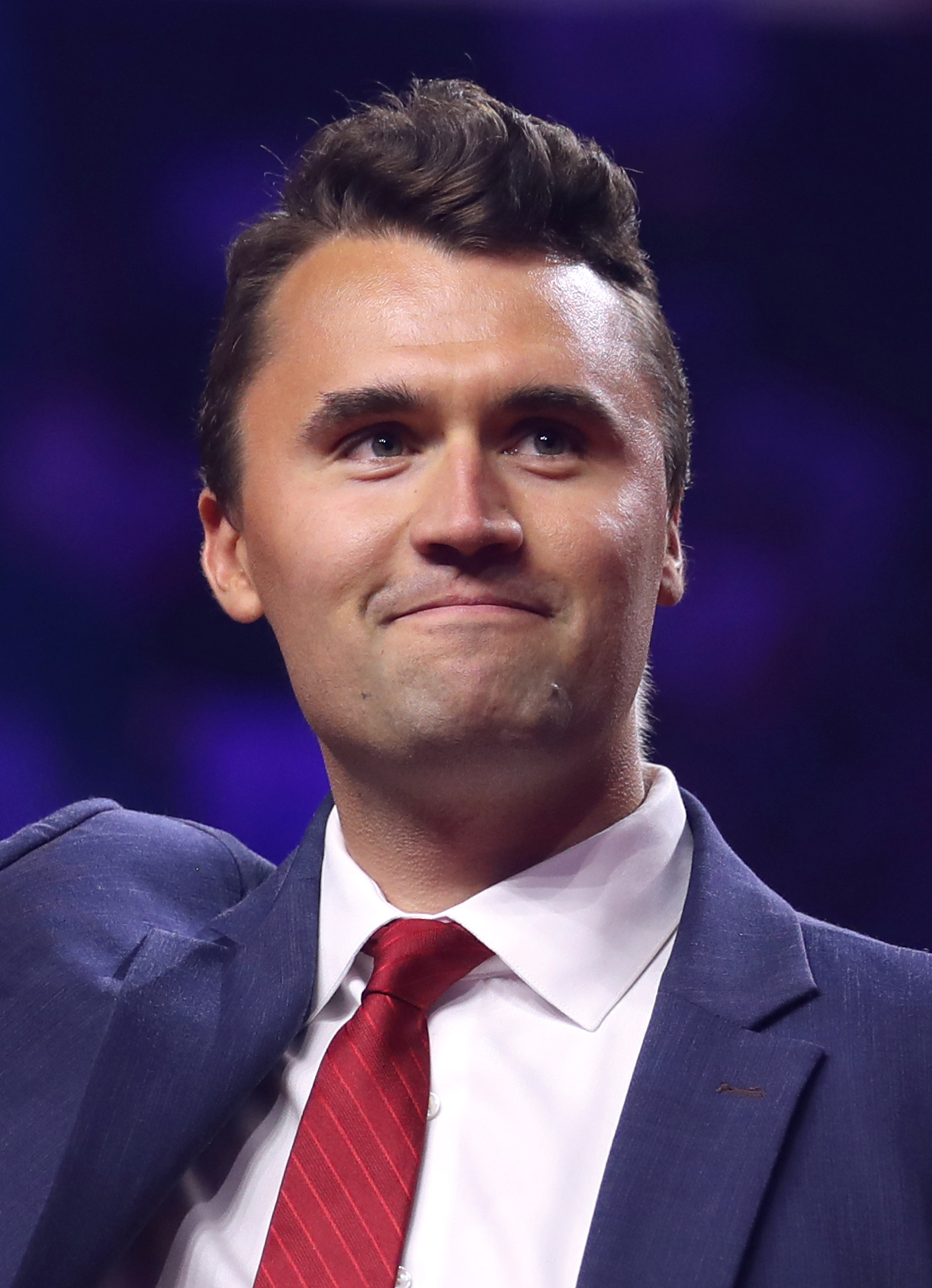
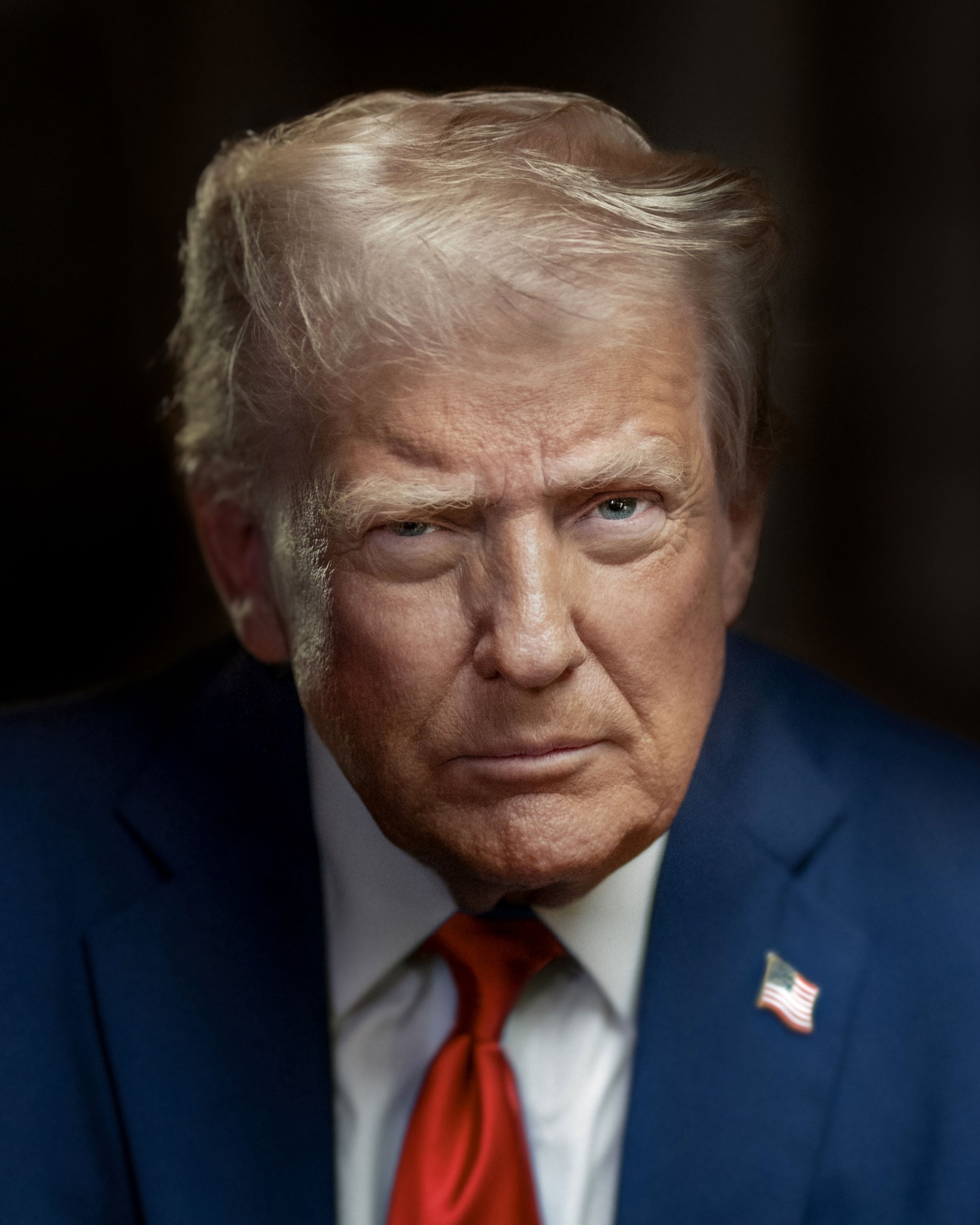
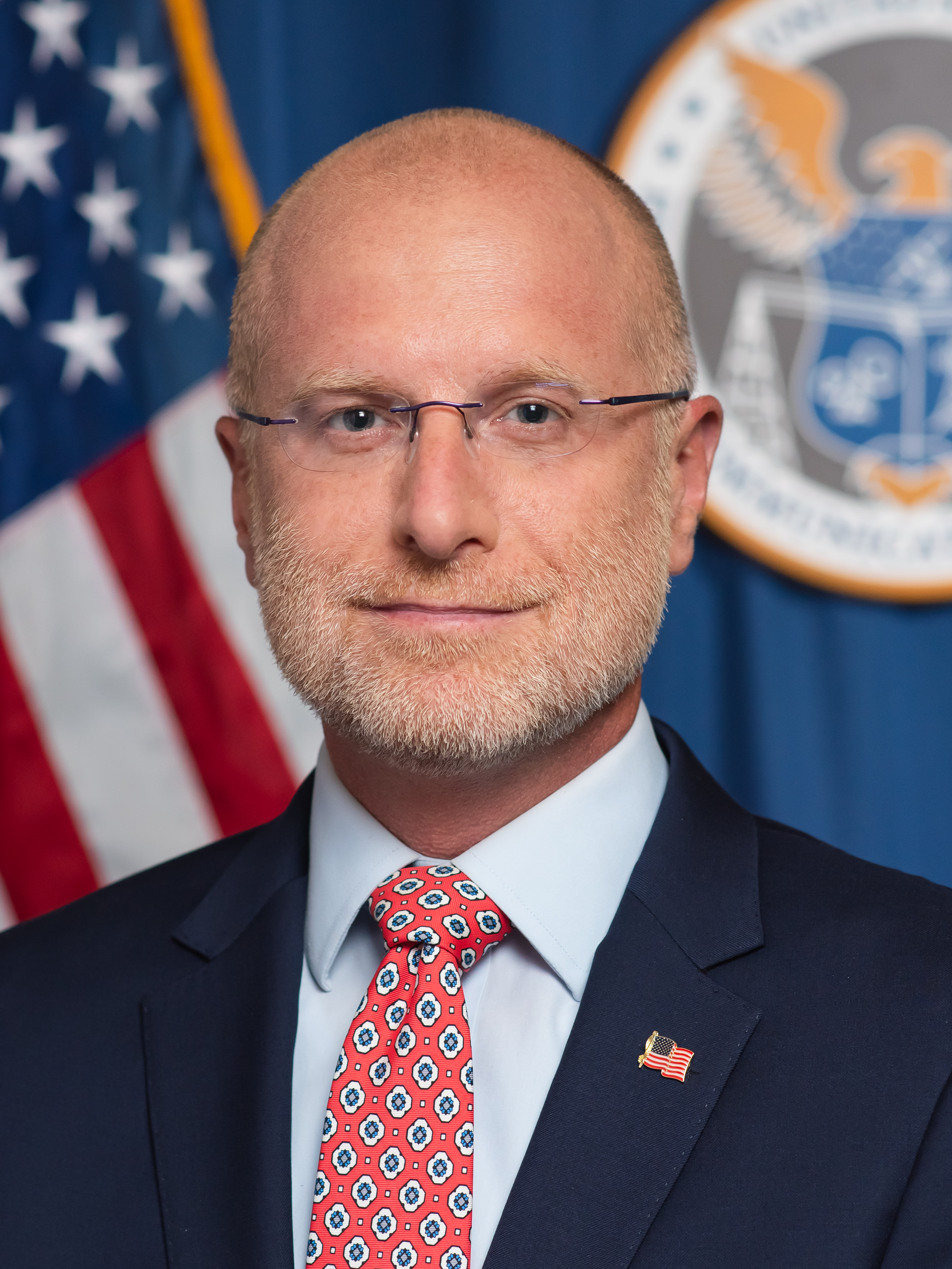
Figures involved in the cancellation, clockwise from top left: Jimmy Kimmel, Charlie Kirk, Brendan Carr, and Donald Trump

From September 17 through September 22, 2025, the American Broadcasting Company (ABC) and its corporate parent, the Walt Disney Company, suspended production of the late-night talk show Jimmy Kimmel Live!, following criticism from conservatives and public pressure from Trump administration officials over Jimmy Kimmel's comedic remarks on the assassination of conservative activist Charlie Kirk.

In his opening monologue, Kimmel had said that "[w]e hit some new lows over the weekend with the MAGA gang desperately trying to characterize this kid who murdered Charlie Kirk as anything other than one of them, and doing everything they can to score political points from it." At the time, the FBI had not mentioned the shooter Tyler Robinson's "background, political leanings or a possible motive, saying the investigation was ongoing", and his mother had told prosecutors that he had shifted toward the political left and had become "more pro-gay and trans-rights oriented".

The network's suspension of Kimmel created backlash from political leaders and commentators, entertainers, entertainment industry unions, constitutional scholars, and the public at large, with boycotts against Disney, ABC, and broadcast station owners Nexstar Media Group and Sinclair Broadcast Group (whose respective decisions to pull Jimmy Kimmel Live! from their ABC-affiliated stations over his monologue remarks prompted the network's own decision to suspend the program), and sparked debate about the erosion of freedom of speech in the United States as well as concerns about encroaching authoritarianism under the Trump administration.

On September 22, 2025, Disney and ABC announced that Jimmy Kimmel Live! would resume production on September 23. In response, Nexstar and Sinclair said their stations would not air the show upon its return, prompting further criticism toward both companies. On September 26, Nexstar and Sinclair announced that they would cease preempting the program.

== Background ==
=== Donald Trump ===
U.S. president Donald Trump has frequently attacked the American mainstream media, claiming it has a liberal bias and is "corrupt". He has also sued various media outlets for perceived inaccuracies or biases (structured in the form of SLAPP litigation designed to extract financial and editorial concessions), and has used his position as president to defund public broadcasting, pressure outlets he dislikes by interfering in their business operations, launching investigations, and threatening to revoke broadcast licenses. At direction of Disney CEO Bob Iger, ABC paid $15 million in December 2024 to settle a defamation lawsuit Trump filed against the network over statements made by This Week moderator George Stephanopoulos that Trump had been found civilly liable for rape rather than sexual abuse in E. Jean Carroll v. Donald J. Trump. Critics saw Iger's surrender to Trump as a dangerous precedent and threat to free speech in the United States.

President Trump promised to "shatter the left-wing censorship regime" in his personal policies platform for the 2024 campaign (Agenda 47) and in his 2025 inaugural address stated: "After years and years of illegal and unconstitutional federal efforts to restrict free expression, I also will sign an executive order to immediately stop all government censorship and bring back free speech to America. Never again will the immense power of the state be weaponized to persecute political opponents — something I know something about. We will not allow that to happen. It will not happen again."

=== Brendan Carr ===
Dating to November 2024, when he was being considered for the FCC chairmanship following Trump's reelection to a non-consecutive second term, Brendan Carr (who was first appointed by Trump to the agency's Board of Commissioners in August 2017) had argued in favor of punishing broadcasters for alleged anti-conservative bias, and described content not being in the public interest if they were biased against conservatives.

Carr authored the FCC chapter of the Heritage Foundation's Project 2025 conservative policy platform, in which he argued for—among other issues—deregulation of broadcast media; restricting social media platforms' Section 230 immunity from liability for third-party content (under a longstanding interpretation of the law by conservatives that incorrectly claims it gives platforms authority to censor online speech); requiring transparency from platforms about changes to recommendation algorithms and their decisions to block or demonetize users; and calling for ban of the social video platform TikTok (contradictory to Trump's pledge during his 2024 presidential campaign), amid public criticism from TikTok users toward the Biden administration and Congress over the Protecting Americans from Foreign Adversary Controlled Applications Act, a federal "divest-or-ban" law targeting the platform, due to alleged national security risks because of its ownership by its Chinese parent company ByteDance.

In December 2024, Carr wrote a letter to Disney CEO Bob Iger that stated that "Americans no longer trust the national news media to report fully, accurately, and fairly", that "ABC's own conduct has certainly contributed to this erosion in public trust", and that he would be "monitoring the outcome" of unrelated financial negotiations of ABC affiliates. He also told Chris Cuomo on NewsNation that he would break up the "censorship cartel" that he claimed to affect the government, social media, and traditional media platforms. The next month, Carr reopened a complaint against WPVI-TV (ABC's Philadelphia owned-and-operated station) that had been dismissed by Jessica Rosenworcel, his predecessor as FCC chair, over ABC's moderation of the September 2024 presidential debate between Trump and Kamala Harris. In March 2025, Carr launched an investigation into Disney's diversity, equity, and inclusion (DEI) practices and threatened to revoke ABC's broadcast license over the practices.

During the first months of his tenure as FCC chair, Carr was criticized by former FCC commissioners and chairs, including Michael Copps, Tom Wheeler, Reed Hundt, and Alfred C. Sikes. After the suspension, social media users found previous comments made public by Carr that were contrary to his stated reasons for pressuring the suspension of Kimmel, which argued against government intervention in regulating non-obscene broadcast material and against restricting access to content based on ideological views expressed by certain outlets. He referred to free speech as the "bedrock of democracy" and described political censorship as a "tool that those in power use to suppress any challenge to their positions or orthodoxy". In 2019, Carr stated: "The FCC does not have a roving mandate to police speech in the name of the 'public interest.'" In another post from 2022, Carr stated: "Political satire is one of the oldest and most important forms of free speech. It challenges those in power while using humor to draw more into the discussion. That's why people in influential positions have always targeted it for censorship." In 2023, Carr reiterated that "free speech is the counterweight – it is the check on government control. That is why censorship is the authoritarian's dream."

=== Jimmy Kimmel ===
While Jimmy Kimmel and ABC had signed a three-year contract extension, running through the 2025–26 season, to continue his show in September 2022, he had considered ending the program just before the 2023 SAG-AFTRA and Writers Guild of America strikes. Kimmel began hosting his ABC late-night talk show in January 2003; incidentally, Jimmy Kimmel Live! was created as a permanent replacement for Politically Incorrect, which ABC canceled in June 2002 following widespread condemnation and advertiser boycotts over host Bill Maher's comments during the political panel talk show's first new episode after the September 11, 2001, terrorist attacks suggesting that the perpetrators were not cowards (contravening remarks made by then-President George W. Bush the day prior to the broadcast), whereas "[American military leaders had] been the cowards, lobbing cruise missiles from 2,000 miles away".

Kimmel has been a relentless critic of President Trump since his first term, declaring, "One of the most fun parts of my job is knowing that he hates being made fun of, and making fun of him", culminating with Kimmel reading and mocking a Truth Social post by then-presumptive Republican presidential nominee Trump at the closing of the 96th Academy Awards ceremony in March 2024. In 2015, during his first presidential candidacy running as a Republican, Trump cancelled a scheduled appearance on Jimmy Kimmel Live!, citing a prior obligation. During his first term, Trump tried to have Kimmel censored by Disney. After the July 2025 cancellation of CBS's The Late Show with Stephen Colbert, he quipped that Kimmel was next.

== Development ==
On the night of September 10, none of the late-night talk shows mentioned the assassination of Charlie Kirk; only The Late Show with Stephen Colbert included a message preceding the pre-recorded broadcast; Kimmel posted condolences on Instagram, abhorring the killing of the conservative activist and Turning Point USA founder, and criticizing "finger pointing" by conservatives towards the left in the wake of the assassination. On September 11, almost all the late-night shows referred to the Kirk killing; Kimmel said, "Like the rest of the country, we’re still trying to wrap our heads around the senseless murder of the popular podcaster and conservative activist Charlie Kirk yesterday, whose death has amplified our anger, our differences, and I've seen a lot of extraordinarily vile responses to this from both sides of the political spectrum. Some people are cheering this, which is something I won't ever understand." He then criticized President Trump for not trying to "bring the country together" like former presidents such as Bush, Barack Obama, Joe Biden, and Bill Clinton had done.

=== Monologue and criticism ===
In his September 15, 2025, opening monologue, Kimmel said about the reaction from President Donald Trump, Trump administration officials (such as deputy policy chief of staff Stephen Miller and attorney general Pam Bondi), and other conservatives to the assassination of Charlie Kirk, "We hit some new lows over the weekend with the MAGA gang desperately trying to characterize this kid who murdered Charlie Kirk as anything other than one of them, and doing everything they can to score political points from it." At the time, the FBI had not mentioned the shooter Tyler Robinson's "background, political leanings or a possible motive, saying the investigation was ongoing", and his mother had told prosecutors that he had shifted toward the political left and had become "more pro-gay and trans-rights oriented". Initial criticism also focused on Kimmel's subsequent remark, which compared Trump's reaction to Kirk's death to a four-year-old mourning a goldfish.

The Hollywood Reporter editor-at-large James Hibberd wrote in a September 18 column that Kimmel's remark on that Monday's broadcast was an aside whose "clunky wording" converted it from the words he said "into the inflammatory conclusion that has been widely reached." In his September 16 monologue, Kimmel directed further criticism towards conservatives aligned with Trump, accusing them of politicizing the assassination to blame and target the left (as well as to demonize transgender individuals, citing misinformation related in part on a debunked tip to federal investigators that claimed the bullets that Robinson allegedly used to shoot Kirk were engraved with "transgender ideology" messages), specifically taking aim at allies like vice president JD Vance (who blamed the left for the assassination during his September 15 guest host appearance on The Charlie Kirk Show) and Trump's son Eric Trump.

During a September 17 interview on conservative commentator Benny Johnson's podcast, FCC chairman Brendan Carr threatened punitive action against ABC, Disney, and independent owners of ABC-affiliated stations if Kimmel was not reprimanded for his monologue remarks, stating: "We can do this the easy way or the hard way. These companies can find ways to change conduct and take action, frankly, on Kimmel, or there's going to be additional work for the FCC ahead." He called Kimmel's comments "truly sick" and claimed his agency "has a strong case for holding Kimmel, ABC, and network parent Disney accountable for spreading misinformation", arguing that Kimmel "appeared to be making an intentional effort to mislead the public that Kirk's assassin was a right-wing Trump supporter."

Carr argued that Kimmel's remarks could be seen as not in the public interest, which he argued is required to hold a broadcast license; however, the FCC's authority in regulating broadcast content is largely limited to obscene material (including graphic profanity, nudity, explicit sexual content, and excessive violence), advertising during children's programs (including restrictions on product cross-promotion with programs), sponsorship identification requirements and the conduct of on-air contests. The agency officially holds that "the public interest is best served by permitting free expression of views", and that "rather than suppress speech, communications law and policy seek to encourage responsive 'counter-speech' from others." While Carr claimed that Kimmel's remarks may have been an act of "news distortion" (although as a late-night entertainment talk show with satirical news commentary, it is doubtful that Jimmy Kimmel Live! would be subject to those requirements), broadcasters are only subject to enforcement if it can be proven that they deliberately distorted a factual news report whereas factual inaccuracies are not actionable.

=== Suspension by ABC ===
Hours after Carr's commentary, Nexstar Media Group and Sinclair Broadcast Group announced that they would pull Jimmy Kimmel Live! from all of their ABC-affiliated stations effective immediately. Nexstar (which operates 28 ABC stations) and Sinclair (which operates 38 ABC stations) are two of the largest operators of ABC-affiliated stations, encompassing a combined 23.84% share of the network's national broadcast coverage (through both wholly owned stations and management agreements with various affiliated licensees such as Mission Broadcasting, Cunningham Broadcasting and Deerfield Media), including coverage in such major markets as Washington, D.C., Seattle, St. Louis, Salt Lake City, and Nashville. Kimmel acknowledged prior to the incident that his show, like most late-night programs in the 2020s, was particularly dependent upon affiliate fees for financial solvency; he observed that a portion of ABC's affiliate fee revenue was earmarked specifically for its late-night programming, including his show. Nexstar stated that it "strongly objects" to Kimmel's comments and called them "offensive and insensitive at a critical time in our national political discourse", while Sinclair stated it would refuse to air the show until "formal discussions are held with ABC regarding the network's commitment to professionalism and accountability", and called for Kimmel to apologize to Kirk's family and to make a donation to Kirk's conservative outreach organization Turning Point USA.

Shortly afterward, ABC announced that Jimmy Kimmel Live! would be suspended indefinitely, a decision that was made by Walt Disney Company CEO Bob Iger and Disney Entertainment co-chair Dana Walden. During discussions with the executives concerning the right-wing criticism of his monologue, Kimmel reportedly refused to apologize but planned to clarify his comments and specifically call out Trump supporters for misconstruing his remarks on his September 17 episode. Sources close to the negotiations said that ABC "hope[d] that it will be able to have Kimmel back on the air 'soon'", although whether Kimmel was willing to return was "unclear". According to unnamed Hollywood Reporter sources, Kimmel felt that what he said did not require an apology, and intended to defend his remark, with a source saying that it had been "grossly mischaracterized by a certain group of people". Disney executives took under consideration the safety of employees and advertisers, as company employees and Kimmel's staff had reportedly received death threats following Carr's remarks and many of them were doxxed on social media. Some Disney employees (including studio and corporate executives) felt that Iger and Walden overreacted to conservative pressure against Kimmel, comparing it to the 2022 controversy surrounding former Disney CEO Bob Chapek's initial refusal to take a stand on the controversial Florida Parental Rights in Education Act, which was condemned by company employees and was viewed by observers as having contributed to his dismissal later that year. The suspension came after prominent conservatives called for any critic of Kirk to be silenced in the period following his September 10 assassination during a campus debate tour stop at Utah Valley University.

Nexstar claimed that its decision to pull Kimmel was made unilaterally and was not influenced by any correspondence with the FCC or other agencies. However, it was observed that Nexstar was in the early stages of seeking FCC approval for its $6.2 billion acquisition of rival media company Tegna (announced on August 19), while Sinclair had recently filed with the FCC to acquire several small-market stations (most of them being Fox affiliates owned by Cunningham) that it had been managing through third-party licensees, and had announced a deal to assume operational control of an ABC-affiliated station (WLNE-TV) in Providence six days prior. Nexstar and Sinclair were among the station owners that had been lobbying the FCC to revise its broadcast ownership rules, including the proposed elimination of a rule passed in 2004—which would require congressional approval to modify or repeal—that limits broadcasting companies from owning or controlling local television stations cumulatively reaching more than 39% of U.S. households. Separately, Disney is seeking federal approval for its purchases of streaming pay-TV service Fubo (announced on January 6, and which it plans to operate alongside the pay-TV assets of Hulu) and a majority stake in NFL Media (owner of NFL Network, announced on August 6), which would be subject to review by the U.S. Department of Justice Antitrust Division and the Federal Trade Commission (FTC).

ABC scheduled reruns of Celebrity Family Feud in Kimmel's 11:35 p.m. ET/PT weeknight timeslot through September 22. Some affiliates (mostly Hearst Television and Nexstar stations) initially opted to run expanded editions of their late-evening newscasts and other local programming in the slot instead. Sinclair intended to air a special edition of its syndicated news program The National News Desk examining Kirk's life and political legacy in Kimmel's timeslot on the company's ABC affiliates (as well as its non-ABC network affiliates and independent stations) on September 19, but scrapped the broadcast hours before it was set to air; the special was instead posted on the program's official YouTube channel. Disney and ABC agreed to pay Jimmy Kimmel Live! crew members through the week of September 20, while discussions continued on whether to bring the show back on the air, with executives reportedly "hopeful" that it could come to a resolution with Kimmel.

=== End of suspension and return episode ===
"Our leader celebrates Americans losing their livelihoods because he can't take a joke. He was somehow able to squeeze Colbert out of CBS. Then he turned his sights on me. And now he's openly rooting for NBC to fire Jimmy Fallon and Seth Meyers, and the hundreds of Americans who work for their shows, who don't make millions of dollars. And I hope that if that happens, or if there's even any hint of that happening, you will be ten times as loud as you were this week."

— Jimmy Kimmel, monologue comment criticizing President Donald Trump for remarks advocating for the cancellation of late-night comedians on the September 23, 2025, edition of Jimmy Kimmel Live!

On September 22, 2025, Disney announced that Kimmel's suspension would be lifted, and Jimmy Kimmel Live! would return to ABC's schedule on September 23. Discussions between Iger and Walden as well as Kimmel's team on a resolution to secure Jimmy Kimmel Live!'s return to the network's schedule lasted through the weekend of September 20 and concluded on the morning of September 22. Regarding whether Kimmel would be subject to any restrictions on his creative freedom as a condition of his return, an unnamed source told Deadline Hollywood: "Jimmy will say what Jimmy wants to say."

At the time of the announcement, it was not known if Nexstar would allow the talk show to air on its ABC stations; however, Sinclair subsequently announced that it would preempt Kimmel's September 23 episode on their ABC affiliates, intending to fill the show's timeslot with news programming, but said "discussions with ABC are ongoing". The following day, Nexstar stated that it would continue to preempt the show; the combined preemptions would result in Kimmel's return not being shown on approximately a quarter of ABC's affiliated stations, which filled the slot with expanded late-night local newscasts or syndicated programs (including The National News Desk on selected Sinclair-run ABC affiliates). Nexstar and Sinclair's decisions to preempt Kimmel spurred calls for advertiser boycotts (both against and by local and national businesses), and viewer complaints (some directed at ABC station owners that had not chosen to preempt the show) and civil protests directed at their stations.

In his September 23 monologue, Kimmel's voice broke at times as he appeared to fight through tears during the segment which began with a nod to Jack Paar, after Paar ended his one-month walkout in March 1960 from The Tonight Show in protest of NBC censors cutting a joke about a "WC" (an abbreviation of "water closet", a slang term for a flush toilet) being confused for a "wayside chapel". Kimmel's monologue opening repeated Paar's opening line upon his own return: "As I was saying before I was interrupted...". Kimmel also thanked entertainment industry allies and conservative politicians and political commentators who spoke out against his suspension and Carr's threats to station owners. Addressing his September 15 remarks, Kimmel expressed he never intended to "make light" of Kirk's murder or direct blame at any group for Robinson's actions. Kimmel also spoke on the importance of free speech, which he admitted he took for granted prior to both his suspension and CBS's July 17 cancellation of The Late Show with Stephen Colbert, calling Carr's remarks in his podcast interview "un-American", "dangerous", and "not a particularly intelligent threat to make in public".

Kimmel criticized President Trump for his remarks advocating for targeting media outlets over negative stories about him and "rooting" for the cancellation of Kimmel and other late-night comedy programs. Responding to a clip of Trump attacking Kimmel and claiming that he "had no ratings", Kimmel retorted: "Well, I do tonight!" He acknowledged that because of President Trump's distaste for being subjected to criticism and satire, ABC was "unjustly" being put at risk of government retaliation by deciding to support his show. Kimmel also praised Charlie Kirk's widow, Erika, for forgiving her husband's assassin during her eulogy at Kirk's memorial service the day prior, calling it "an example we should follow". In a reference to remarks by Republican senator Ted Cruz comparing Carr's threat to Goodfellas, actor Robert De Niro (who starred in the 1990 biographical gangster film) made a cameo appearance portraying an FCC chairman in the mold of a mafia boss.

The September 23 episode, which featured actor Glen Powell and singer-songwriter Sarah McLachlan as Kimmel's guests, was seen by 6.26 million viewers, making it the most-watched regular episode of Jimmy Kimmel Live! to date. The 17-minute monologue received 26 million views across various social media platforms (including YouTube, Instagram, and TikTok) by the afternoon of September 24. A 28-minute compilation of the full monologue and the De Niro cameo sketch uploaded to the show's official YouTube channel received 15.3 million views in 24 hours, a record for a Kimmel monologue on the platform. The New York Times writer John Koblin observed, "To score 6.2 million viewers on a late-night show in 2025, without an NFL playoff game providing a lead-in boost, is highly unusual. To do it without a few dozen local affiliates airing the show is even more eye-opening."

On September 26, Sinclair and Nexstar both announced that they would resume airing Jimmy Kimmel Live! on their respective ABC-affiliated stations, effective that evening, when ABC aired a rebroadcast of the September 23 episode. Despite this, the fallout was not considered to be over. In the words of senior columnist Beth Kowit writing for Bloomberg News, "this shouldn't be confused for Disney or Iger suddenly rediscovering their moral high ground. Instead, it's a realization that submitting may come with a higher price than pushing back."

== Reactions ==
=== Politicians and government officials ===
In December 2025, Carr was questioned in congressional testimony for the first time about the suspension and his comments on The Benny Johnson Show before the Senate Commerce Committee. Carr was subsequently questioned about the suspension at a hearing of the Communications and Technology Subcommittee of the House Energy and Commerce Committee in January 2026.

==== Trump administration ====
"Great News for America: The ratings challenged Jimmy Kimmel Show is CANCELLED. Congratulations to ABC for finally having the courage to do what had to be done. Kimmel has ZERO talent, and worse ratings than even Colbert, if that's possible. That leaves Jimmy and Seth, two total losers, on Fake News NBC. Their ratings are also horrible. Do it NBC!!!"

— Donald Trump, President of the United States in a post on Truth Social, September 18, 2025

President Trump, a frequent critic of Kimmel and other late-night comedians dating to his first presidency, responded to Kimmel's suspension on Truth Social on September 18, deriding Kimmel and Stephen Colbert (whose CBS program, The Late Show with Stephen Colbert, was cancelled on July 17 and ended on May 21, 2026), and calling on NBC to fire both Tonight Show host Jimmy Fallon and Late Night host Seth Meyers. In subsequent days, Trump made several remarks reiterating support for punitive regulatory actions against media outlets for what he perceives as negative coverage, claiming without evidence that the networks are "an arm of the Democrat[ic] party" and that he "read ... that the networks were 97% against me", that critical coverage of him was "illegal", and that "dishonesty" would be grounds for broadcast outlets to have their licenses revoked. Trump praised FCC chairman Brendan Carr, calling him "outstanding" and a "tough guy" who "loves our country". White House press secretary Karoline Leavitt denied that pressure from the Trump administration prompted Kimmel's suspension, asserting in a Fox News interview that "the decision to fire Jimmy Kimmel and to cancel his show came from executives at ABC". The official White House Rapid Response account on X (formerly Twitter) celebrated the suspension: "They're doing their viewers a favor. Jimmy is a sick freak!"

CNN reported that Carr reacted to the news of the suspension with a celebratory dancing GIF from The Office. On the same day, Glee actor Kevin McHale, after reposting another tweet that framed right-wing attacks on the media as attacks on the First Amendment, posted on X, "This was all in Project 2025, btw." to which Carr replied on September 18 with a GIF of Jack Nicholson nodding from the movie Anger Management.

In a September 18 appearance on The Scott Jennings Radio Show, Carr suggested further action against ABC's The View, asserting that the daytime panel talk show (which the network produces through its news division and features discussions on current events and pop culture) could be in violation of equal time rules. However, the program had featured both liberal and conservative political figures, and its hosts included Alyssa Farah Griffin, a former strategic communications director and assistant during the first Trump administration, and Ana Navarro, a former Republican political strategist. In addition, the cited rule only requires broadcasters to provide comparable time and placement for opposing candidates, not necessarily "programs identical to the initiating candidate". The hosts of The View had themselves been criticized for not initially discussing the Kimmel suspension on the show, but they did on the September 22 broadcast, with host Whoopi Goldberg saying, "Did y'all really think we weren't going to talk about Jimmy Kimmel? I mean, have you watched the show over the last 29 seasons? No one silences us."

FCC commissioner Anna M. Gomez defended Kimmel's right to freedom of speech, arguing that his remarks criticizing Republicans for their response to Kirk's assassination were protected by the First Amendment.

During a September 22 appearance at the Concordia Summit, Carr denied any role he had in Kimmel's suspension, claiming that Disney "made the business decision" to take the host off the air and that his remarks on Johnson's podcast were not intended as an explicit threat of punitive action against owners of ABC stations, and accused Democrats condemning him for his threats of "distortion" regarding the FCC's role in the suspension. The next day, in response to Democratic California state senator Scott Wiener criticizing media consolidation and calling for antitrust action against Sinclair after the company reiterated its stance on Kimmel, Carr defended Sinclair's decision not to air Kimmel on its ABC affiliates, saying that it was "a good thing" that certain station owners have "pushed back on a national programmer like Disney".

On September 23, in a Truth Social post made about an hour before Kimmel's first episode post-suspension, Trump criticized ABC for reinstating Kimmel and suggested that he would sue the network over the decision, citing his 2024 defamation lawsuit against the network over statements made by This Week moderator George Stephanopoulos the previous March about the verdict in E. Jean Carroll's lawsuit against Trump, in which he was found civilly liable for sexually assaulting and defaming Carroll. Trump stated, "Last time I went after them, they gave me $16 million dollars. This one sounds even more lucrative." Critics and media analysts highlighted his threat as buttressing Kimmel's remarks in that night's monologue criticizing Trump for unlawfully using government power to pressure media outlets and other corporate entities. The day after Trump's post, Bloomberg News reported that, upon consultation with legal experts, Disney executives expressed confidence it would prevail in legal challenges against the Trump administration to any FCC efforts to revoke broadcast licenses belonging to the network's owned and affiliated stations in retaliation for reinstating Kimmel.

On September 24, vice president JD Vance claimed that Carr's threat to Disney, ABC, and owners of the network's affiliates was merely "a joke", and downplayed criticism that government pressure had been placed on broadcasters over Kimmel's September 15 monologue remarks, while attempting to contrast Carr's actions to anecdotal claims (dismissed in 2024 by the U.S. Supreme Court in Murthy v. Missouri) that the Biden administration officials pressured the company to remove misinformation about the COVID-19 pandemic. Vance also said he found Kimmel's monologue on his return broadcast the previous night to be "kind of kind-hearted", but was frustrated that he did not apologize for the earlier comments criticizing conservatives for their response to Kirk's assassination and attempting to distance themselves ideologically from Robinson.

==== Democratic Party ====
House minority leader Hakeem Jeffries, joined by House minority whip Katherine Clark and House Democratic Caucus chair Pete Aguilar, denounced Carr's comments and called for him to resign. Senate minority leader Chuck Schumer also called for Carr's resignation; along with ten Senate Democrats, he wrote a letter to Carr criticizing his comments and demanding answers to questions about their implications for broadcasters. Following Trump's comments backing Carr, Connecticut Senator Chris Murphy accused Trump of "using the power of the White House, in this case the power of his regulatory agencies, to try to shut down any speech that opposes him".

California representative Ro Khanna described Carr's actions and Kimmel's suspension as the "largest assault on the First Amendment and free speech in modern history". A motion filed by Khanna to subpoena Carr to appear before the U.S. House Oversight and Government Reform Committee was defeated by Republicans in a 24–21 party-line vote; however, California representative and ranking committee member Robert Garcia said he planned to work with Oversight Committee chair James Comer to secure Carr's testimony before the committee. On September 24, Garcia and Florida representative and U.S. Economic Growth, Energy Policy, and Regulatory Affairs Oversight Subcommittee ranking member Maxwell Frost sent a letter to Nexstar Media Group chairman/CEO Perry Sook seeking comment regarding if the company's decision to preempt Kimmel on its ABC stations following his reinstatement resulted from pressure by the Trump administration. On September 19, Democratic members of the U.S. Senate Committee on Commerce, Science, and Transportation, led by ranking member Maria Cantwell, sent a letter to committee chairman Ted Cruz requesting him to subpoena Carr to testify.

Former president Barack Obama said that media companies should "start standing up" for free speech media "rather than capitulating to it", citing both Kimmel's suspension and the dismissal of Washington Post columnist Karen Attiah over comments about Kirk, and criticized the Trump administration for taking cancel culture to "a new and dangerous level" by "routinely threatening regulatory action against media companies unless they muzzle or fire reporters and commentators it does not like". California governor Gavin Newsom tangentially cited Kimmel's suspension and other efforts to target individuals who spoke out against Kirk (including death threats, workplace firings, and doxings) since Kirk's assassination, accusing Republicans of not believing in free speech and "censoring [people] in real time". Illinois governor JB Pritzker called Kimmel's suspension an "attack on free speech [that] cannot be allowed to stand", and called on elected officials to speak out against it saying, "A free and democratic society cannot silence comedians because the President doesn't like what they say." On September 22, New York City mayoral nominee Zohran Mamdani cancelled a scheduled September 25 candidate town hall event on ABC-owned flagship station WABC-TV in protest. After ABC reinstated Kimmel that afternoon, Mamdani (who called the lifting of Kimmel's suspension "a victory for free speech") announced his campaign would work with WABC to reschedule the event.

==== Republican Party ====
Senate majority leader John Thune and Republican senators Ted Cruz, Dave McCormick, Thom Tillis, Mitch McConnell, Jerry Moran, and Lisa Murkowski, alongside U.S. House Energy and Commerce Committee chairman Brett Guthrie, criticized or expressed concern about Carr's comments. On his Verdict podcast, Cruz (who holds oversight authority over the FCC as chair of the U.S. Senate Commerce, Science, and Transportation Committee) criticized FCC chair Carr's behavior, saying his threat to ABC was "right out of Goodfellas" before adding: "That's right out of a mafioso coming into a bar going, 'Nice bar you have here; it'd be a shame if something happened to it.'" He also stated that it would set a precedent for a future Democratic FCC chair to exert pressure on broadcasters for offensive speech by conservatives. McConnell agreed with Cruz's remarks, saying, "You don't have to like what somebody says on TV to agree that the government shouldn't be getting involved here."

Kentucky senator Rand Paul said that Carr had "no business" threatening license revocations over Kimmel's remarks while stating that "despicable comments, you have the right to say them, but you don't have the right to employment", and argued that "you can be fired for not being popular." Oklahoma Senator Markwayne Mullin dismissed Cruz's concerns, contending that ABC executives had the right to suspend Kimmel and claimed Carr's threat was inconsequential to the matter given the content of Kimmel's remarks; Mullin compared Disney and ABC's disciplinary action against Kimmel to Fox News's 2023 firing of Tucker Carlson, which he erroneously claimed was due to his misinformation about the COVID-19 pandemic. Following Trump's September 23 Truth Social post threatening legal action against Disney and ABC over Kimmel's reinstatement, former congressman Justin Amash said Trump's words "torpedoed every White House surrogate who claimed the administration wasn't attempting to coerce Disney/ABC".

=== Political commentators ===
Conservative commentators had mixed opinions on Kimmel's suspension, with many voicing support for ABC's decision. Fox News host Greg Gutfeld said on the September 17 episode of his talk show Gutfeld! that he was not upset by the suspension and his guests (which included Drew Pinsky, who came to know Kimmel when they both worked at Los Angeles radio station KROQ in the 1990s) held that there were limits to free speech on network TV. Piers Morgan claimed Kimmel's remarks had caused "understandable outrage all over America" and questioned why he was "heralded as some kind of free speech martyr", while Megyn Kelly attacked Kimmel for the remarks and accused him of lying about the shooter's ideology, saying "good riddance". Turning Point USA staff celebrated ABC's suspension of Kimmel for "baselessly suggesting that the shooting suspect had been a fellow conservative."

Others expressed concern about government interference and the perceived potential for turnabout against conservatives under a future Democratic administration. Candace Owens (who once served as communications director of Kirk's organization Turning Point USA) argued that Kimmel's suspension by ABC and the demands asked of him by Sinclair Broadcast Group were not justified, and that she wanted "the attacks on free speech to stop". Ben Shapiro said Kimmel had "been awful at his job for full-on a decade" and that ABC affiliates were within their rights to pull his show, but held that the FCC "should not be threatening action against ABC or its affiliates or Disney" and questioned whether Nexstar and Sinclair made their preemption decisions due to pressure from Carr or if they made them on their own accord. Joe Rogan said the government should not be involved in "dictating what a comedian can or cannot say in a monologue", and warned conservatives celebrating the suspension that they are "crazy for supporting this, because this will be used on you".

Following the company's decision to resume production on Kimmel's show, Clay Travis said Disney and ABC made the "right decision" to bring it back, arguing that media personalities—regardless of political affiliation—should not be taken off the air based on a single controversial comment. National Review columnist Jim Geraghty held that Kimmel's reinstatement did not change the "censorious implications" of Carr's remarks, and derisively stated it had been "fascinating to watch" conservatives critical of the former fairness doctrine, which the FCC abolished in 1987 under chairman Dennis R. Patrick and president Ronald Reagan, "argue that we need a federal agency to intervene when enough conservatives think a television network has aired something that is unfair". Washington Post columnist and former ABC News contributor George Will expressed concern that the precedent set by the Trump administration's involvement in the Kimmel controversy could lead to an eventual reinstatement of the fairness doctrine under a future Democratic administration.

=== Media and entertainment industry ===
"We know this moment is bigger than us and our industry. Teachers, government employees, law firms, researchers, universities, students and so many more are also facing direct attacks on their freedom of expression. Regardless of our political affiliation, or whether we engage in politics or not, we all love our country. We also share the belief that our voices should never be silenced by those in power – because if it happens to one of us, it happens to all of us."

— American Civil Liberties Union, open letter signed by over 400 entertainers, September 22, 2025

Numerous entertainers and performers, including Ben Stiller, Pedro Pascal, Kathryn Hahn, Rosie O'Donnell, Adam Carolla, Wanda Sykes, Mike Birbiglia, Jean Smart, and Mark Ruffalo, expressed their support for Kimmel while criticizing Disney, ABC, and Carr for the suspension. Producer Damon Lindelof vowed that he "can't in good conscience" work for Disney or ABC unless the company lifted Kimmel's suspension. Several performers, such as O'Donnell, Marisa Tomei, Tatiana Maslany, and Amy Landecker, called for boycotts against Disney, including urging fans to cancel subscriptions to Disney-owned streaming services Disney+, Hulu, and ESPN, and boycott ABC programs, Disney products (including movies, theme parks, and merchandise), and advertisers.

Fellow late-night hosts Stephen Colbert, Jon Stewart, Seth Meyers, Jimmy Fallon, Bill Maher, and John Oliver, as well as former hosts David Letterman, Jay Leno, and Conan O'Brien, expressed support for Kimmel. On September 18, several late-night hosts discussed the suspension and spoke in support of Kimmel on their respective shows. Colbert revived his former persona and recurring segment "The Wørd" for that night's Late Show, making parallels between the suspension and his CBS program's cancellation. Fallon presented a monologue where he was constantly interjected by an off-screen announcer reading off pro-Trump statements. Stewart presented a "government-approved" version of his show that sarcastically praised the president and his administration. Meyers addressed the situation during the recurring segment "A Closer Look", sarcastically praising Trump. Former Disney CEO Michael Eisner expressed support for Kimmel and criticized the FCC for intimidating ABC and Disney. Howard Stern criticized Disney and ABC for the suspension, saying "I just know [that] when the government begins to interfere, when the government says, 'I'm not pleased with you, so we're gonna orchestrate a way to silence you,' it's the wrong direction for our country."

Within hours of the announcement that Kimmel had been suspended by ABC, three entertainment industry unions—SAG-AFTRA, the Writers Guild of America (WGA) and the American Federation of Musicians (AFM)—each issued statements condemning Disney and ABC for the decision. SAG-AFTRA called ABC's decision to suspend Jimmy Kimmel Live! "the type of suppression and retaliation that endangers everyone's freedoms" and the WGA stated it stands "united in opposition to anyone who uses their power and influence to silence the voices of writers, or anyone who speaks in dissent", while the AFM condemned Carr's role in the suspension and said the FCC "identified speech it did not like and threatened ABC with extreme reprisals", calling it an act of "state censorship". On September 18, SAG-AFTRA, AFM, the International Alliance of Theatrical Stage Employees (IATSE), and the Directors Guild of America (DGA) issued a joint statement expressing the unions' support for Kimmel and concern about the implication of the decision on freedom of speech, stating such "political pressure on broadcasters and artists chills free speech and threatens the livelihoods of thousands of working Americans". That same day, more than 300 SAG-AFTRA and WGA members picketed outside the Walt Disney Studios in Burbank to protest ABC's decision to indefinitely suspend Kimmel.

On September 20, ABC News Studios notified reporters and press photographers that it would scrap the red carpet for the September 21 Los Angeles premiere of Lilith Fair: Building a Mystery; several of the musicians featured in the Hulu documentary who were also scheduled to perform at the event, including Sarah McLachlan and Jewel, reportedly decided to cancel their appearances as a result of the Kimmel suspension controversy. Over 400 entertainers—including Tom Hanks, Meryl Streep, Jennifer Aniston, Ben Affleck, Robert De Niro, Lin-Manuel Miranda, Natalie Portman, Kevin Bacon, Selena Gomez, Olivia Rodrigo, Jamie Lee Curtis, Jane Fonda, Kerry Washington, Jason Bateman, Jim Parsons, Joaquin Phoenix, Regina King, Julia Louis-Dreyfus, and Martin Short—signed an open letter from the American Civil Liberties Union (ACLU) released on September 22, which does not reference Trump or Carr by name, calling out "government threats to our freedom of speech" in opposition to ABC's suspension of Kimmel and broader ongoing efforts to undermine or suppress protected speech.

Over 100 former ABC News journalists, executives, and producers—including Sam Donaldson, Lisa Stark, Judy Muller, and Chris Bury—signed an open letter to Disney CEO Bob Iger on September 24, urging him to make "a concerted effort to defend free speech and press freedom against political intimidation", and commending the company's decision to reinstate Kimmel, calling it "an important statement that political intimidation should not dictate ABC's programming". The letter states that Disney has "both the responsibility and the opportunity to lead by standing firmly against capitulation and in defense of democratic values", arguing that Disney and ABC's December 2024 lawsuit settlement emboldened Trump to escalate his attacks on the media.

While not naming the Kimmel controversy directly, the South Park episode "Conflict of Interest" satirized Carr for his apparent censorship of free speech. After a series of incidents though the episode, the fictitious Carr is hospitalized with toxoplasmosis and broken bones, an orthopedic cast holding his arm in a Nazi salute. Doctors inform vice president Vance that should the Toxoplasma gondii reach Carr's brain, "he may lose his freedom of speech". Vance proceeds to threaten the hospitalized Carr over the U.S. presidential line of succession, saying, "We can do this the easy way or the hard way", quoting the real Carr's comments before Kimmel's suspension.

=== Civil liberties organizations ===
First Amendment advocacy organizations including the American Civil Liberties Union (ACLU) and the Foundation for Individual Rights and Expression (FIRE) issued statements condemning the suspension and the government overreach from the Trump administration that allegedly led to the decision. ACLU Democracy and Technology Division director Christopher Anders said that Kimmel is "the latest target of the Trump administration's unconstitutional plan to silence its critics and control what the American people watch and read", accusing ABC and Nexstar of "cowering to threats" and capitulating to FCC chairman Brendan Carr by suspending Kimmel indefinitely. FIRE stated that the FCC has "no authority to control what a late night TV host can say, and the First Amendment protects Americans' right to speculate on current events even if those speculations later turn out to be incorrect", arguing that subjecting broadcasters to liability for factual inaccuracies would turn the FCC into an "arbiter of truth and cast an intolerable chill over the airwaves". In November 2025, Protect Democracy filed a petition with the FCC signed by a bipartisan group of former agency commissioners and staffers (including former chairs Tom Wheeler, Alfred Sikes, Mark Fowler, and Dennis Patrick) to eliminate the agency's news distortion regulation cited by Carr in his comments about Kimmel's monologue on First Amendment grounds.

=== Public opinion ===
In addition to protests by entertainment unions, civilian protests had taken place outside of Disney's offices and studios in Los Angeles, Burbank, and New York, with calls for boycotting Disney products and cancelling subscriptions to the company's streaming services spreading across social media (even among non-Kimmel viewers who objected to what they saw as Disney capitulating to the Trump administration's threats and broader objections to government interference in Americans' free speech rights), while Google searches for "cancel Disney Plus" and "cancel Hulu" spiked in the days following Kimmel's suspension. On Instagram, posts on the topic addressed how users wanted to "stand for something" and "boycott all Disney movies". Multiple Reddit threads instructing and advising those supporting Kimmel to cancel their Disney+ subscriptions logged over 1,000 comments.

According to a YouGov survey of 2,927 American adults conducted on September 18, 50% of respondents disapproved of ABC pulling Jimmy Kimmel Live! following Carr's comments (42% of those strongly disapproved and 8% disapproved somewhat) and 35% strongly or somewhat supported the decision (26% of those strongly approved and 9% approved somewhat), while 16% were not sure. A survey of more than 3,010 adults published by YouGov on September 19 found that 44% of respondents viewed the federal government as the greatest threat to free speech, more than activist groups (17%), social media companies (12%), or corporations (6%); 15% were unsure and 3% responded "none of the above".

=== International ===
On his RTL 4 satire program LUBACH, Dutch comedian Arjen Lubach criticized Disney and ABC's decision to pull Kimmel's show, saying: "So Jimmy Kimmel's show has been cancelled by Disney because Donald Trump and a helpful bureaucrat are silencing everyone who dares criticize him ... Everything has to be exactly how Trump likes it. Everything has to be MAGA now." Later in the episode, an animated sequence shows a Trump Tower appearing behind the castle from the 2006 Walt Disney Pictures logo and "MAGA-fied" versions of popular Disney characters, such as Simba and Timon and Pumbaa wearing MAGA hats and singing "Hakuna MAGA-ta", Belle's father telling her "you're so hot, if you weren't my daughter, I'd probably be dating you", Aladdin and Jasmine pulled out of the sky and loaded into a van by U.S. Immigration and Customs Enforcement (ICE), "We Don't Talk About Bruno" changed into "We Don't Talk About Jeffrey", Prince Eric telling Ariel that he was going to "grab her by the pussy", Bambi's mother getting shot after saying "trans women are women", and Anna becoming a climate change denier by saying that living snowman Olaf is proof that climate change is not real. The piece showed fictional upcoming Disney titles like High School Musical Shooting, JD Vance Live!, The Lying King, and Brendan Carrs.

=== Financial impacts ===
Due to the high volume of customers cancelling their subscriptions to Disney+ and Hulu in protest, the cancellation pages of both streaming services crashed multiple times in the days following the suspension. Subscriptions analytics firm Antenna, reported that the monthly churn rates or cancelation rates for Disney+ and Hulu surged from 4% and 5% in August 2025 respectively to 8% and 10% in September 2025. Both sites had a steady churn rate prior of 3-4% for Disney+ and 4-5% for Hulu prior to the upswing.

Shortly after initial calls for a boycott against the company and its products, shares of Disney stock experienced a 0.67% decline, reflecting an estimated loss of $3.87 billion in the company's market value (although some analysts suggested the market losses ranged anywhere from $1.5 billion to $4 billion). As a result of consumer boycotts, other analysis show that Disney's stock on the September 17–23 period fell by 2.39 percent, which was equivalent to nearly $5 billion in market value. Although some attributed the stock decline to the boycott, business analysts indicated it may actually have been due to normal market fluctuation.

On September 25, the American Federation of Teachers, the AFL-CIO, and Reporters Without Borders as Disney shareholders sent a letter to CEO Bob Iger demanding records of Disney board of directors materials, communications, and policies related to the suspension due to a 3.3% decline in the company's share price between September 17 and 22, arguing that the decision was based on political pressure rather than the interests of shareholders.

== Analysis ==
=== Legal issues ===
The Jimmy Kimmel Live! suspension prompted discussion over whether the federal government violated the First Amendment by pressuring broadcasters over Kimmel's remarks. The September 18 episode of The Late Show with Stephen Colbert was dedicated to the discussion of the First Amendment and freedom of speech, with interviews with Jake Tapper and David Remnick. Tapper attributed the situation to financial interests influencing corporations' decisions above principles, a matter he also discussed on CNN, noting that broadcasters need the FCC's authorization to expand their portfolio of local television stations and to secure changes to FCC rules barring companies from owning stations that cover more than 39% of American households. It was also observed that with the suspension, Trump had violated his own Executive Order 14149, "Restoring Freedom of Speech and Ending Federal Censorship", which purportedly aimed to prohibit government infringement of American citizens' protected speech rights.

Kimmel's suspension was viewed critically as falling into a broader pattern of major corporations and other American institutions (from Beltway law firms to universities) hewing to demands from, and fears of legal and regulatory retaliation by the Trump administration, rather than challenging regulatory actions and executive orders of dubious or nonexistent constitutional standing. Critics compared the action to a $16 million settlement that Disney and ABC reached with Trump in December 2024 in his defamation lawsuit over statements made by moderator George Stephanopoulos in a This Week interview with South Carolina representative Nancy Mace the previous March that Trump had been found civilly liable for raping former Vogue columnist E. Jean Carroll, a lawsuit that legal scholars held Disney would likely have won as the statement had been based on findings in the jury deliberations of Carroll's lawsuit against Trump for repeated character defamation regarding her allegations that Trump sexually assaulted her in the mid-1990s, holding that the settlement had emboldened him to make further demands of media companies through lawsuits and regulatory actions. (Note: The statement, made during a question by Stephanopoulos about Mace's continued support of Trump despite being a survivor of sexual assault herself, was based on a clarification by judge Lewis A. Kaplan (who presided over the civil battery and defamation lawsuit E. Jean Carroll v. Donald J. Trump) that the jury found that Trump had raped Carroll through forcible digital penetration (defined under New York penal code as sexual assault), concluding her rape allegation was "substantially true" outside the state's legal definition.)

University of Chicago law Professor Genevieve Lakier, who specializes in free speech issues, viewed Carr's threats to ABC as jawboning, which were prohibited by Supreme Court First Amendment precedents. Former FCC chair Tom Wheeler observed in an interview with Wired that "[Carr's] been very artful in not making formal decisions that are appealable to the court, but instead having these informal, coercive activities that are not appealable, and so until Congress or the courts say he can't, he'll keep pushing." Likewise, The New York Times Supreme Court correspondent Adam Liptak wrote that "constitutional scholars said Supreme Court cases over more than 60 years indicate that the Trump administration's threats this week were in tension with the conventional understanding of what the Constitution allows." Brent Skorup of the libertarian Cato Institute criticized the power that the FCC has held since the New Deal era, when Congress gave the FCC broad authority to regulate broadcasters "in the public interest". (Note: The nationalization of the airwaves in the United States and the requirement that broadcasters operate in the "public interest, convenience or necessity" in order to receive a license began under the Radio Act of 1927 that was signed into law by president Calvin Coolidge rather than under the Communications Act of 1934 that created the FCC and was signed into law by Franklin D. Roosevelt. For further context, see The Information Needs of Communities: The Changing Media Landscape In a Broadband Age (PDF) (Report). Federal Communications Commission. 2011. pp. 280–281.) He concluded: "As long as the FCC retains the authority to police broadcast content, every licensed station operates under an implicit threat: say something a powerful political faction dislikes, and your license is in jeopardy. That's incompatible with a First Amendment worthy of the name."

=== Authoritarianism parallels ===
The New York Times writer Damien Cave compared the suspension, along with President Trump's expressed threats to revoke the broadcast licenses of networks he perceives as not providing favorable coverage or critique of him, to the situation comedians and journalists face in contemporary authoritarian regimes, such as China under Xi Jinping, Hungary under Viktor Orbán, India under Narendra Modi, Iran under the Ayatollahs, Russia under Vladimir Putin, Turkey under Recep Tayyip Erdoğan, and Bolivarian Venezuela, also citing Italy during the Berlusconi era. Citing scholars analyzing Hungary's democratic backsliding, CNN media correspondent Brian Stelter wrote of Kimmel's suspension: "That's how Hungarian prime minister Viktor Orbán consolidated control of the media in his country [...] President Trump and his allies appear to be running the same playbook against media outlets in the US." The New York Times also reported that Chinese immigrants and academics compared the suspension of Kimmel's show as similar to actions taken by Communist China in censoring the media.

Kimmel's show suspension was compared to the early years of Russia under Putin, who censored the TV series Kukly (Puppets) after it mocked him among other public officials, with concerns about more censorship and repression to come. John Oliver alluded to it in his show, including images of the Frontline documentary Putin's Revenge, which shows Putin's takeover of television, specifically of the channel NTV where Kukly was aired, and a Russian journalist lamenting not having protested. In The Moscow Times, investigative Andrei Soldatov observed that at the time "many Russian liberal journalists and public intellectuals were quick to rationalize the attack on NTV and Kukly. They deliberately chose to ignore the early signs of the repressive regime Putin was building, justifying it by saying the country needed fixing and had to become strong." Melanie McFarland of Salon wrote: "Colbert and Kimmel are merely the latest casualties in this long march toward what's shaping into a darker period than the McCarthy Era. That ended, in part, because President Dwight D. Eisenhower worked to undermine Senator Joseph R. McCarthy. This time the White House is leading the charge against the nebulous left, empowering modern McCarthy-equivalents like Carr to do his bidding. Ironically, this echoes a very Russian tradition."

David Remnick, editor of The New Yorker, announced the early unveiling of the following week's cover, a cartoon by Barry Blitt depicting "a modest-sized hand" holding a remote control "with a big, red 'Power' button at the top; the others say things like 'Mute', 'Stifle', 'Banish', and 'Muzzle'. And at the bottom, there's one for 'Deport'." Remnick alluded at the interview he gave to Colbert, writing "this cover is funny in a 'ha-ha' way—and funny in the sense that it reflects our alarming reality. The president is trying to press the Mute button on satire, on aggressive reporting, on criticism. The question is: Who will bow down and who, in the name of free expression and the Constitution, will speak up?"

== Post-suspension events ==
In an April 2026 episode, Kimmel joked in a skit that first lady Melania Trump looked like an "expectant widow". Following the episode, the FCC opened reviews into eight television broadcast licenses owned by Disney. In August 2026, Disney filed a lawsuit against the FCC and Carr, alleging that the administration had waged a "campaign of censorship" in violation of the First Amendment. In September 2026, Kimmel interviewed Democratic candidate James Talarico on the show; the segment was not aired on television and only uploaded to YouTube after Carr threatened to exempt the show from the equal-time rule.
