= Quello Center for Telecommunication Management and Law =

Research center at Michigan State University

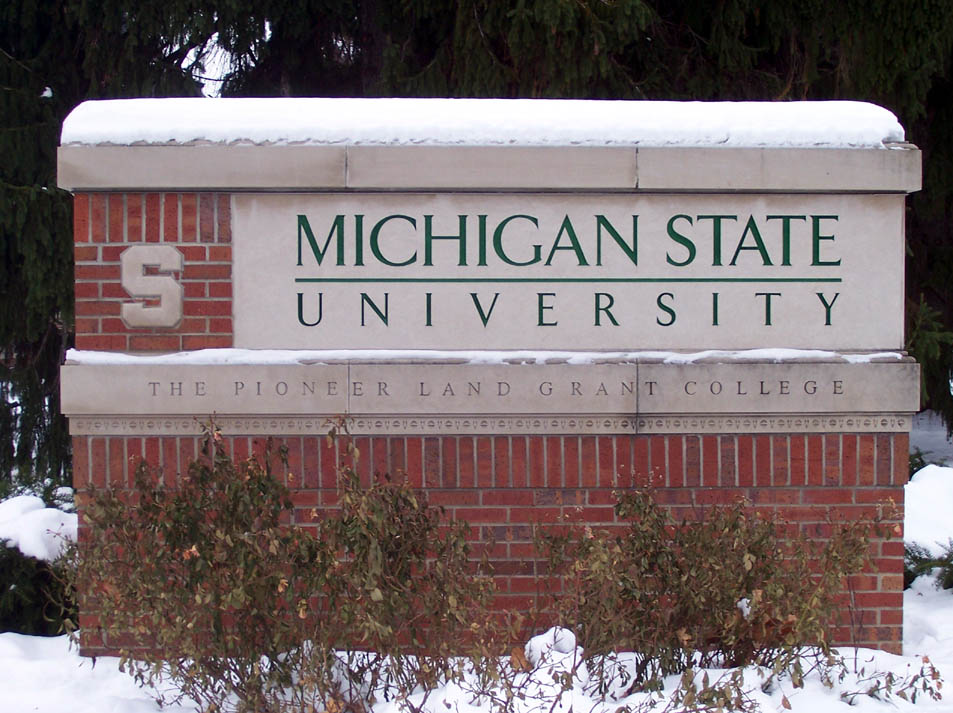
Michigan State University

The James H. and Mary B. Quello Center for Telecommunication Management & Law is a research center at Michigan State University in East Lansing, Michigan. Part of the Department of Media and Information (formerly Telecommunication, Information Studies, and Media) at the College of Communication Arts and Sciences, the Quello Center is dedicated to original research on issues of information and communication management, law and policy. It is named for former Federal Communications Commission chairman James H. Quello.

== History ==
James H. Quello and his wife Mary at swearing-in ceremony as Federal Communications Commission chairman in Washington

The Quello Center was established in 1998 for research, teaching, and the development and application of expertise in telecommunication management and policy. It is named for James H. Quello, who served as Federal Communications Commission commissioner for 23 years including one year as acting chairman, and his wife Mary B. Quello (1913–1999). He married Mary in 1937. Both of them were Michigan State University undergraduate students. James Quello, policy maker and broadcasting executive, who has received many honors and awards, including the Distinguished Service Award from the National Association of Broadcasters, was inducted to the Museum of Broadcast Communications' Radio Hall of Fame in Chicago and is a member of Broadcasting/Cable Hall of Fame in New York City.

In 2014, William H. Dutton, founding director of the Oxford Internet Institute, became the director of the Quello Center. Prior to that, in August 1999, Steven S. Wildman became its first director, holding the endowed James H. Quello Chair for Telecommunication Studies, joined by Barbara A. Cherry as associate director and associate professor in the Department of Telecommunication. In 2001, Johannes M. Bauer, joined the center. He is professor and department chairperson in the Department of Media and Information and was named executive director in 2003. In August 2010, Jonathan A. Obar joined the center as its newest associate director, and as a visiting assistant professor in the Department of Media and Information.

== Research initiatives ==
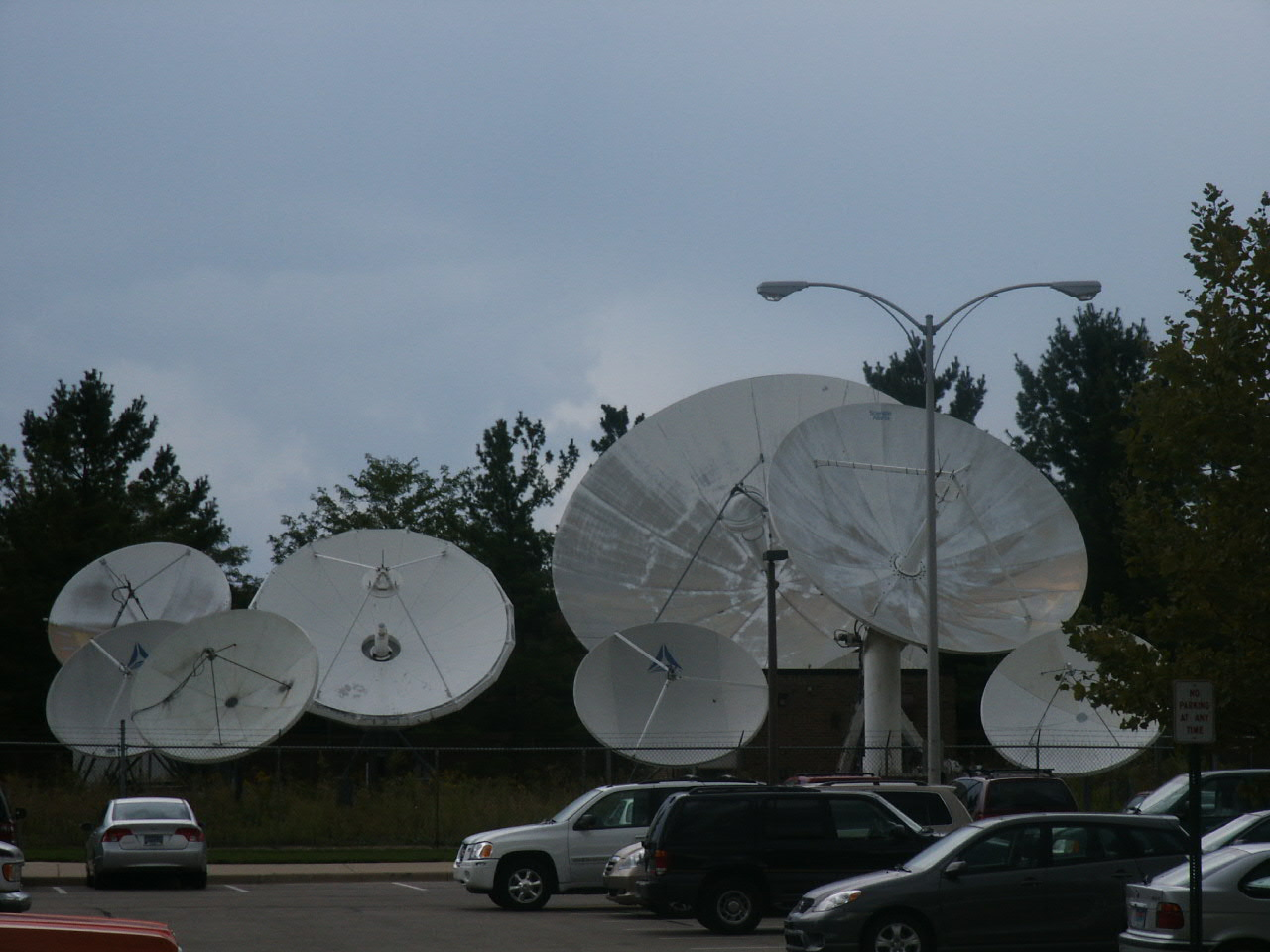
College of Communication Arts and Sciences at Michigan State University

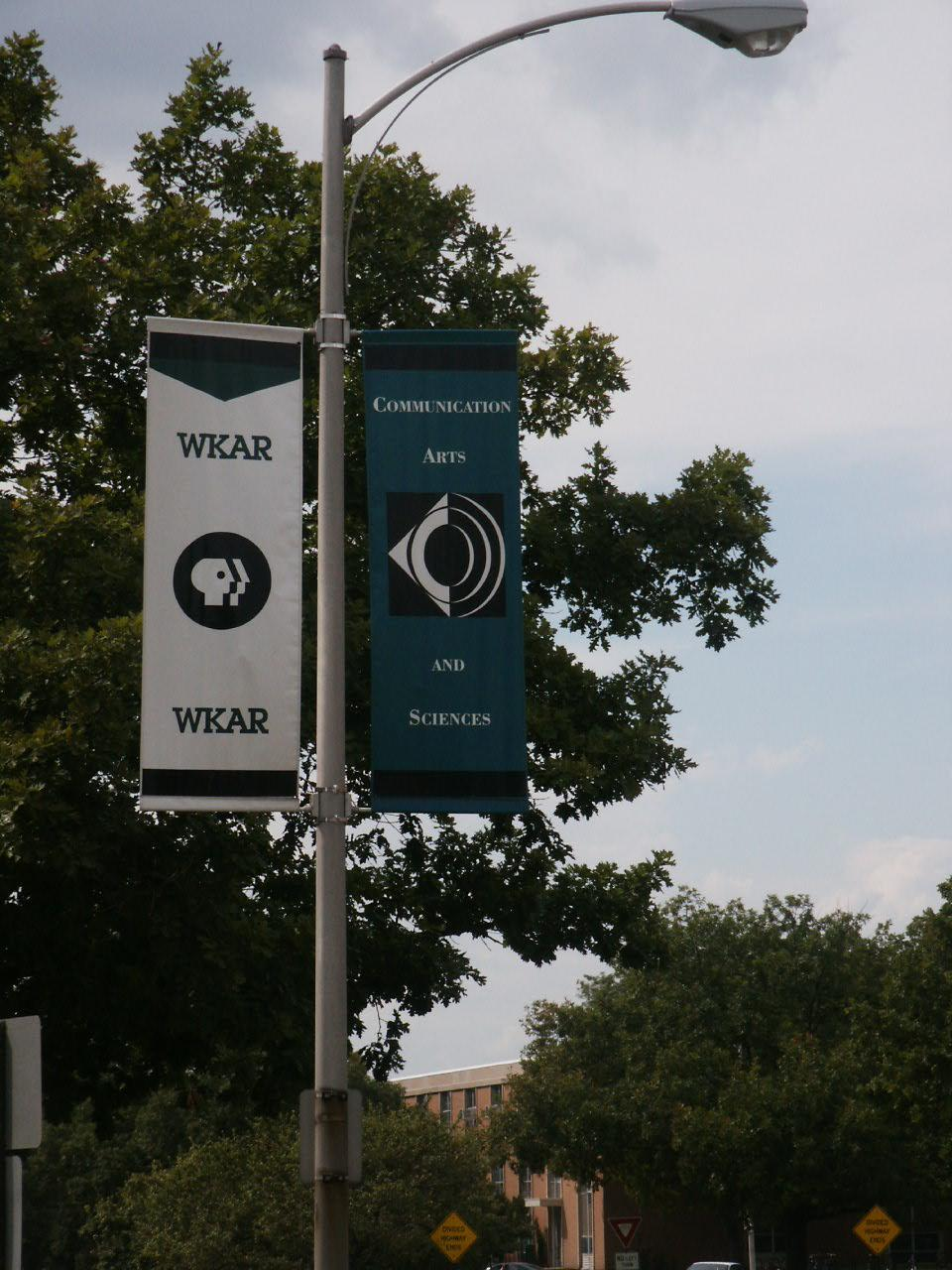
MSU College of Communication Arts and Sciences

Following are some of the ongoing research initiatives of the Quello Center:

- Benefits of Broadband
- Pricing of Commercial time for broadcast and commercial television
- The economics of media audience
- Dynamics of investment and innovation in Wireless services
- Factors shaping diffusion of broadband in the OECD countries
- The future of broadcasting in digital environment
- Antitrust in Media and Telecommunications
- Issues of Media and Telecommunication ownership
- Content bundling for information services
- Governance of the information society
- Communication industry economics and management
- Internet industry and streaming media
- Application of complexity theory to information and communications policy
- Methods for evaluating the outcomes of legal and regulatory policy
- Spectrum Governance
- U.S. Telecommunications Policy-making
- Next-generation wireless services
- E-commerce and internet access
- New Communication Policy Paradigm
- The Governance of Social Media

== People ==
The Quello Center is home to leading scholars in the field of communications and telecommunications economics, technology and political economy. Among them are William H. Dutton, founding director of the Oxford Internet Institute, Steven S. Wildman, PhD. (former director), Johannes M. Bauer, PhD. (director of special programs), and Steve Lacy, PhD. (director of media studies).

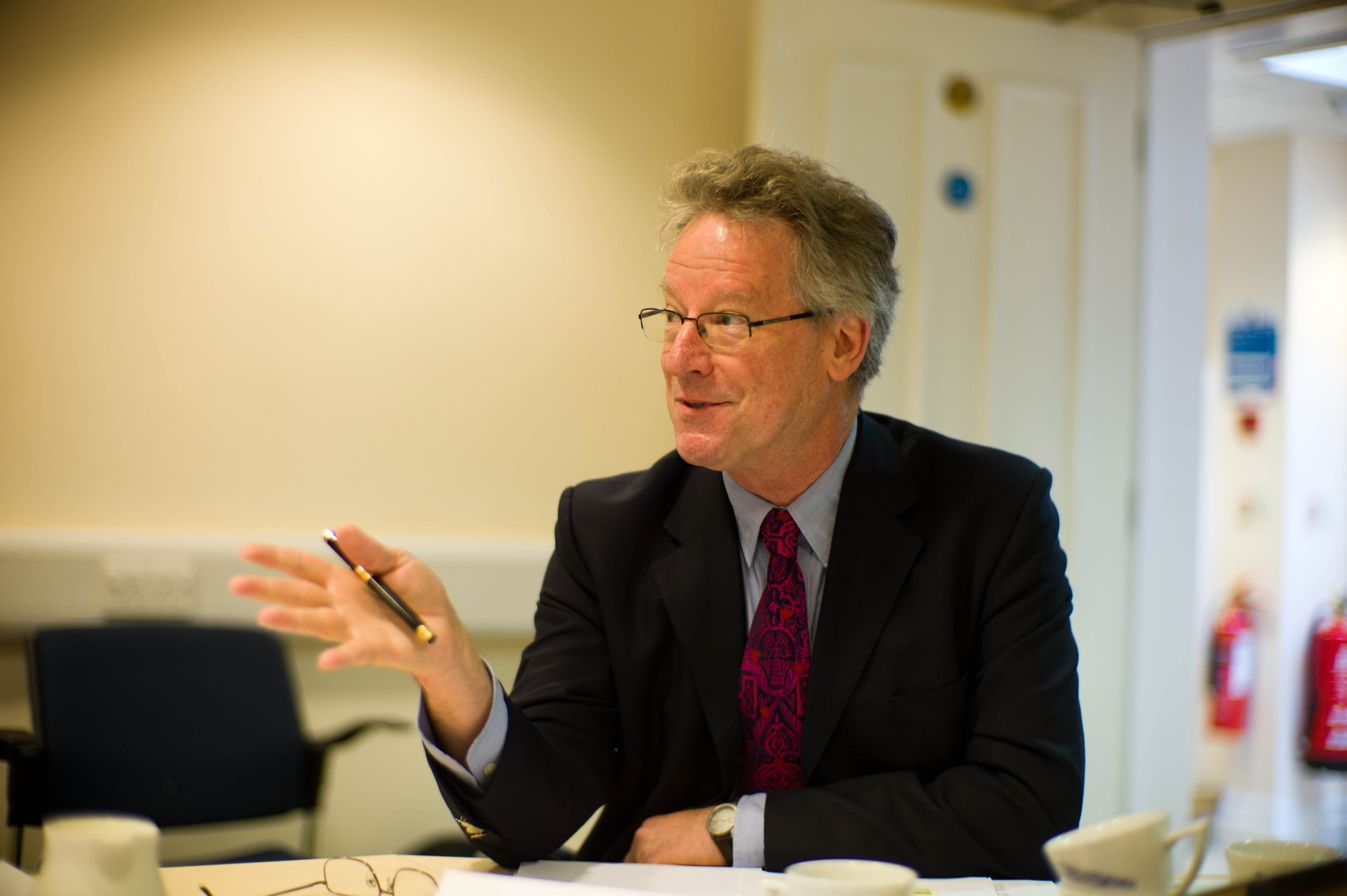
William H. Dutton - Director

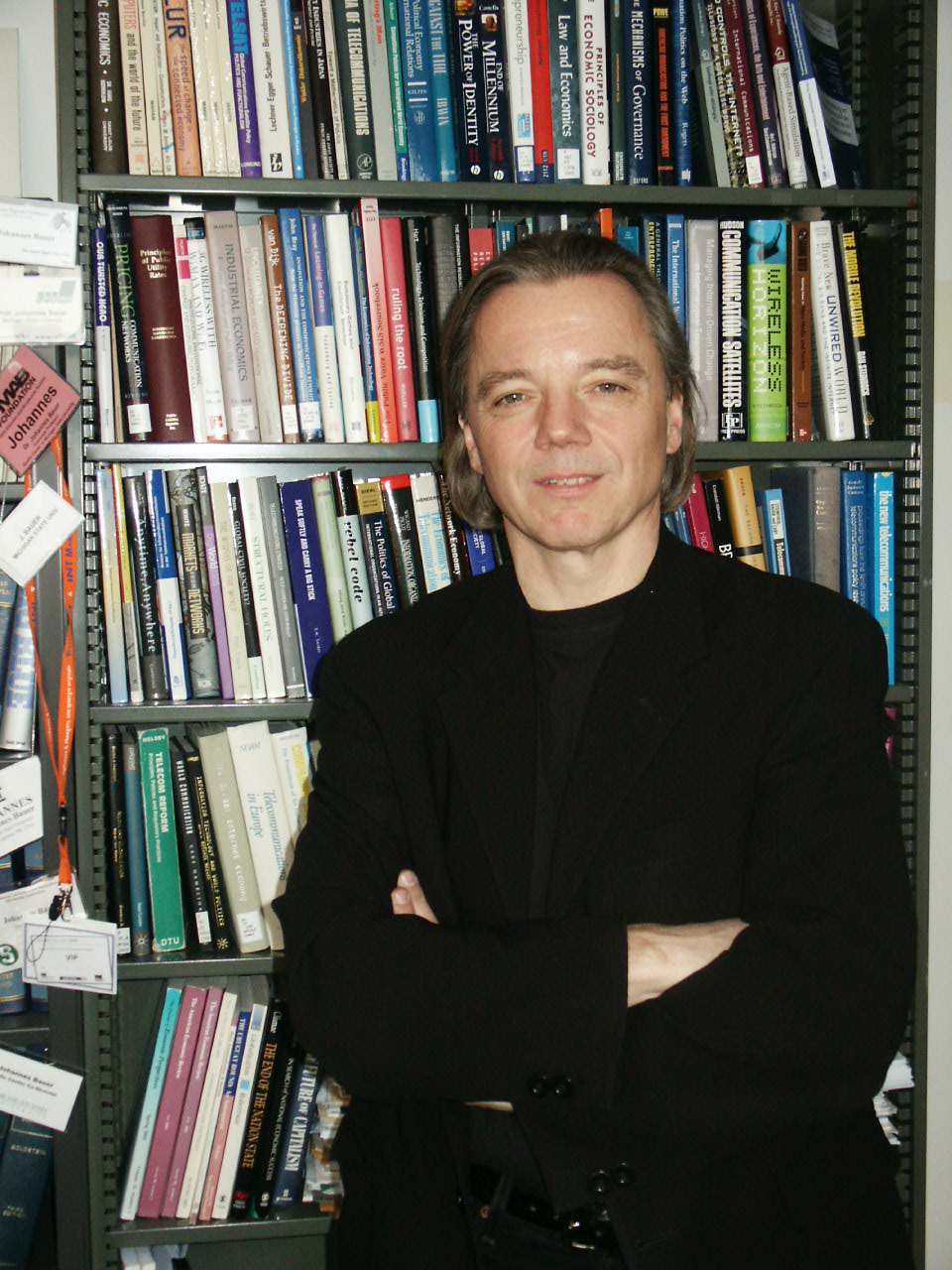
Johannes M. Bauer, PhD. - Director of Special Programs

Wildman, PhD in economics from Stanford, previously served as associate professor of Communication Studies and director of the Program in Telecommunications Science, Management and Policy at Northwestern University. Bauer, PhD in economics from Vienna University of Economics and Business Administration in Austria, previously worked as director of Institute of Public Utilities and Network Industries at the Eli Broad Graduate School of Management and professor at Delft University of Technology in the Netherlands. Lacy, PhD in journalism from the University of Texas at Austin is a professor in the Michigan State University Department of Communication and School of Journalism.

Faculty associates include: Thomas F. Baldwin (senior fellow) Adam Candeub, Gary Reid, Kevin Saunders, and Peter K. Yu. Research associates include: Barbara Cherry, Wayne Fu, Robert LaRose, Hairong Li, Nora Rifon, Charles Steinfield (department chair), Carol Ting, and Pamela Whitten (Dean of College of Communication Arts and Sciences).

Research assistants include: Tithi Chattopadhyay, Sang Yup Lee, Wenjuan Ma, and Sonya Yan Song. Joy Mulvaney serves as the primary administrator of the center.

The Quello Center hosts many national and international scholars (including Fulbright program), many of them were and are involved in award-winning research. Members of advisory board in 2006 were: Rudy Baca (vice president, Precursor Group), Lauren J. “Pete” Belvin (Federal Communications Commission), Marjory Blumenthal (associate provost, Georgetown University), Rick Coy (Clark, Hill, P.L.C, John D. Evans (John D. Evans Foundation), Brian Fontes (vice president of Federal Relations, Cingular Wireless), Eddie Fritts (president and CEO, National Association of Broadcasters), Richard D. McLellan (Attorney at Law, Dykema Gossett, PLLC), Patrick J. Mullen (president, Tribune Broadcasting), Robert Pepper (chief of policy, Federal Communications Commission), James H. Quello (Wiley Rein LLP), Charles Salmon (acting dean, College of Communication Arts & Science, Michigan State University), Richard E. Wiley (Wiley Rein LLP), Karole White (Michigan Association of Broadcasters).

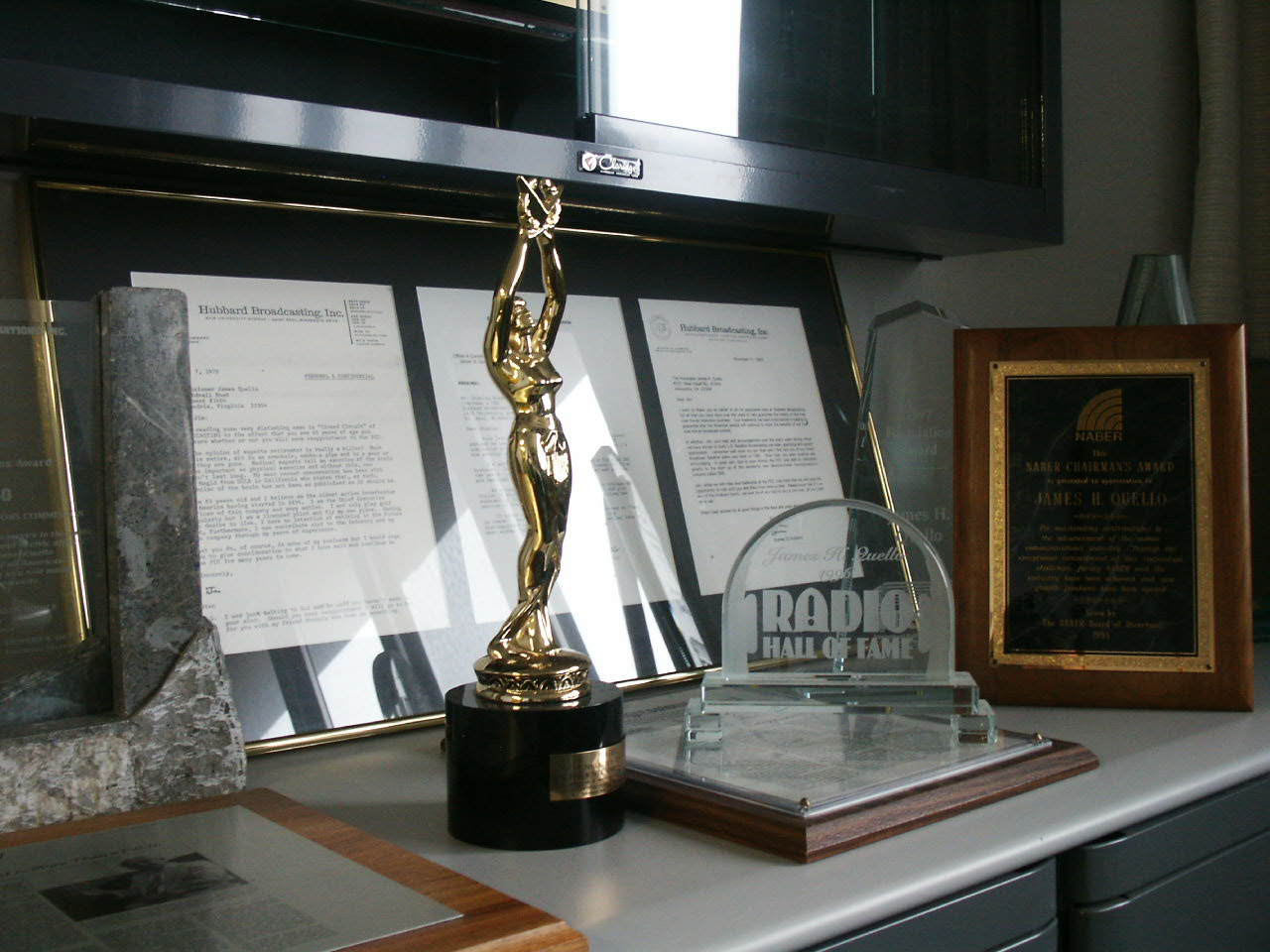
Awards and honors presented to James H. Quello on display at the Quello Center

== Funding ==
Center's activities are enabled by an endowment to which nearly 200 donors contributed. The center pursues funding from major national agencies and the private sector and conducts independent research.

== Annual Quello Lecture ==
- October 15, 2014 – Lisa Nakamura "Racism, Sexism, and Video Games: Social Justice Campaigns and the Struggle for Gamer Identity"
- November 4, 2013 – Alessandro Acquisti "Privacy in the Age of Augmented Reality"
- October 17, 2012 – Constance Steinkuehler "Designing and Researching Games for Impact: National Challenges, Local Initiatives”
- October 24, 2011 – Milton Mueller “Internet Freedom in the Age of Google and Facebook”
