= William Dutton =

William or Bill Dutton may refer to:

- William H. Dutton (born 1947), British academician and professor
- William Dutton (captain) (1811–1878), Australian whaler
- William Dutton (singer), a member of the boy band The Choirboys and later on solo singer
- William Dutton (speed skater) (born 1989), Canadian speed skater
- Bill Dutton (American football), American football player
- Bill Dutton (trainer), British jockey and racehorse trainer
