= Johannes Bauer =

Johannes Bauer is the name of:

- Johannes M. Bauer, American professor
- Johannes Bauer (musician) (1954–2016), German trombonist
