= James Henry Quello =

American governmental official (1914–2010)

James Quello
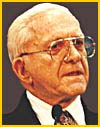

Chairman of the Federal Communications Commission Acting
- In office February 5, 1993 – November 28, 1993
- President: Bill Clinton
- Preceded by: Alfred Sikes
- Succeeded by: Reed Hundt

Personal details
- Born: James Henry Quello; April 21, 1914
- Died: January 24, 2010 (aged 95)
- Party: Democratic
- Education: Michigan State University

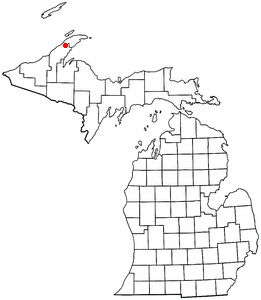
Location of Laurium, Michigan

James Henry Quello (April 21, 1914 – January 24, 2010) was a broadcaster and government official who notably served as acting Chairman of the Federal Communications Commission (FCC) in 1993. Described as a "conservative Democrat", Quello was first appointed to the FCC by Republican president Richard Nixon. Quello's term as acting chairman ended when Reed Hundt was confirmed by the Senate, and he stepped down from the FCC entirely in 1998.

Quello was a World War II veteran during the European conflict in 1941–1945 and was a friend of President Gerald Ford. At the time of his death he was the chairman of James H. Quello and Mary B. Quello Center for Telecommunication Management and Law at Michigan State University which was named in honor of the former commissioner and his wife. Up until his death Quello was also working as a consultant in the Government Affairs law office of Wiley Rein.

== Early life, education and marriage ==
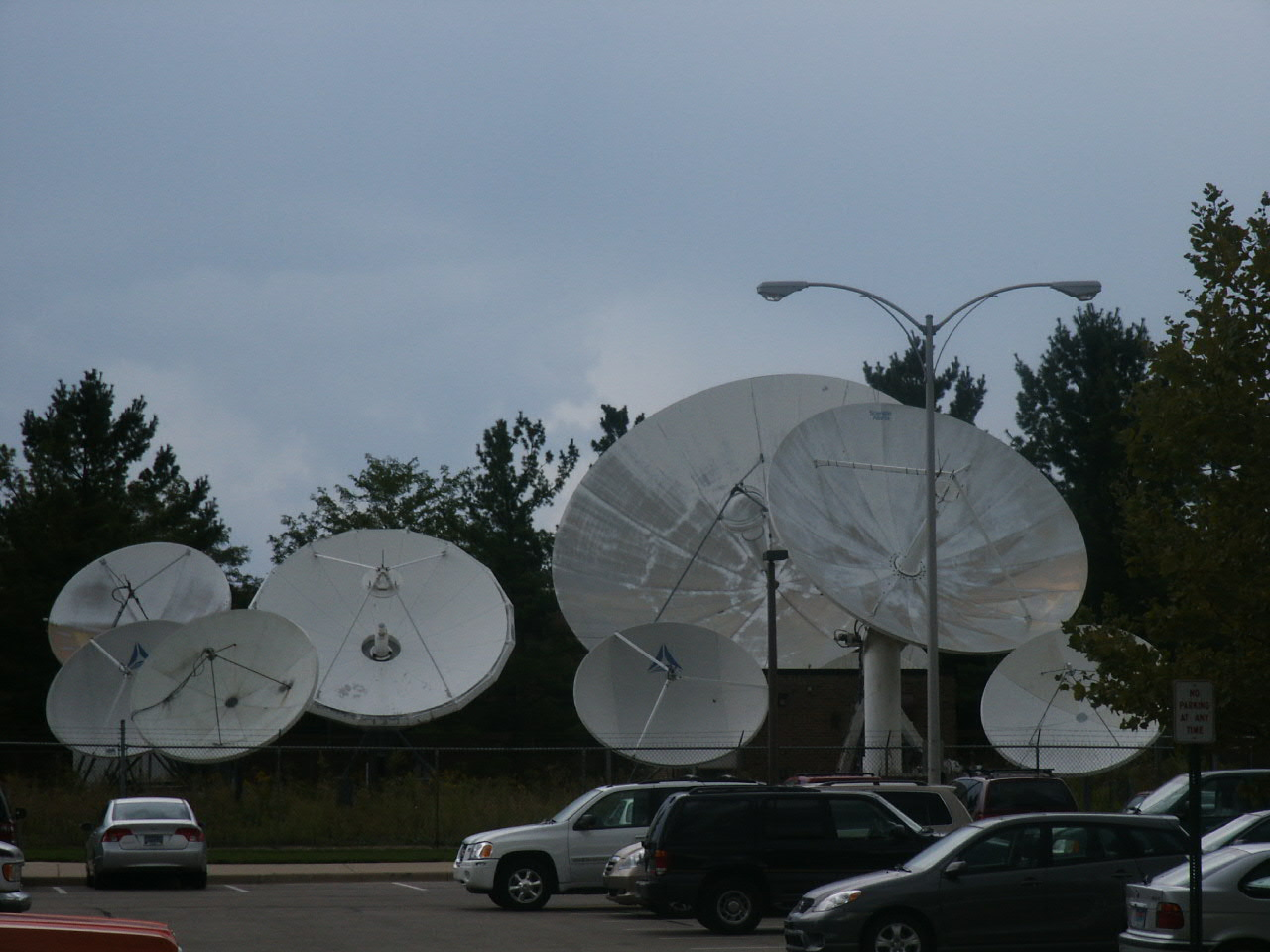
College of Communication Arts and Sciences at Michigan State University

Quello hailed from Laurium, Michigan, in the Upper Peninsula (often called "U.P."), where his parents settled after immigrating from northern Italy; he also had a sister, Alice, who later settled in Pennsylvania. Quello, along with his future wife Mary (who died in October 1999), were undergraduate students at Michigan State University in the 1930s. James graduated with a Bachelor of Arts degree and he and Mary were married September 14, 1937. In 1998, Michigan State University honored both with the creation of the James H. Quello and Mary B. Quello Center for Telecommunication Management and Law. James served on the Board of the Center and was also affiliated with Wiley Rein, a prominent Washington, D.C. law firm. In addition to numerous awards for his public service, Quello received awards and honorary degrees from Northern Michigan University and Michigan State University.

== World War II ==
During World War II, Quello served as a lieutenant and lieutenant colonel in the United States Army (1941–45). He took part in six infantry amphibious assault landings in the war theater in Europe and Africa and fought in Africa, Sicily, Italy, France, and Germany. Quello earned several decorations and campaign ribbons and served as a trustee of the Michigan Veterans Trust Fund, having been appointed in turn by four different governors of Michigan. He is the author of My Wars, Surviving WWII & the FCC, published in March 2001.

== Broadcasting career ==
Quello started his career in radio broadcasting immediately after returning from Europe in 1945. He worked in the promotions department at WXYZ/Detroit. Two years later, Quello moved to rival station WJR and became vice president and general manager in 1960. When Capital Cities Broadcasting purchased WJR, Quello became WJR station manager and a Capital Cities vice president. For 21 years he served on the Detroit Housing and Urban Renewal Commission.

== Federal Communications Commission ==
James H. Quello and his wife Mary at swearing-in ceremony as FCC chairman in Washington

He was first appointed commissioner at the Federal Communications Commission by then U.S. president Richard M. Nixon in 1974. He served there until 1997 when he stepped down. His nomination at first sparked controversy as Ralph Nader accused Quello of "being a pawn for broadcasters". Fellow Michiganian, House minority leader and future United States Vice President and President Gerald Ford supported Quello's nomination by Nixon.

For several months in 1993 Quello was the acting chairman of the FCC, succeeded by Bill Clinton nominee Reed E. Hundt. Despite his brief tenure as FCC chairman, The New York Times described his term with the headline "Temporary Chief Proves More Than a Fill-In". He also was once characterized as "Trumanesque" for his forthright and down-to-earth, approach to government deliberations.

As FCC commissioner and chairman, Quello became known for his independent thinking. He has been a champion of preserving free universal television. His decisions contributed to the transition of the FCC and the UAmerican broadcasting market into the Information Age during a period of revolutionary technological and economic change. He argued for deregulation (he took a position against financial-interest and syndication rules) but was supportive for regulation as well. "I do deregulation, I don't do anarchy", The New York Times quoted Quello as saying.

In the early 1980s, he opposed the FCC's move to let owners of TV stations sell their licenses after owning them a year. He called for legislation that would allow the commission to keep closer watch on the level of violence on TV.

== Awards ==
Quello earned numerous accolades during his career, including a Distinguished Service Award from the National Association of Broadcasters (1994) and the first Milestone Award from the Institute for Communications Law Studies at the Catholic University of America. James H. Quello was inducted into the Michigan Association of Broadcasters, Broadcasting/Cable Hall of Fame in 1995 and the next year into the Museum of Broadcast Communications’ Radio Hall of Fame. James Quello received a record 41 lifetime achievement and distinguished service awards for his service to the FCC.

In 1997 Quello received the Distinguished Service Award from both ALTV and NCTA, where Ted Turner presented the award, "for uncommon devotion to his country in peace and war." On his 23rd anniversary at the FCC, Quello was honored by Chairman Hundt and Commissioners Ness and Chong at a laudatory dinner attended by over 1,200 devoted friends and family, as well as many distinguished members of the community. Later that year he was presented the Ellis Island Medal of Honor Award and Tom Murphy, former CEO of Capital Cities/ABC, presented the International Radio and Television Society Foundation, Inc.'s Lifetime Achievement Award.

== Death ==
On January 24, 2010, Quello died of heart and kidney failure while surrounded by his family at his home in Alexandria, Virginia. He was 95.

Government offices
| Preceded by Alfred C. Sikes | Chairman of the Federal Communications Commission; February 1993 – November 1993 | Succeeded by Reed E. Hundt |
