= Anne P. Jones =

Commissioner of the Federal Communications Commission
- In office April 7, 1979 – May 31, 1983
- President: Jimmy Carter; Ronald Reagan
- Preceded by: Margita White
- Succeeded by: Dennis R. Patrick

Personal details
- Born: February 9, 1935 (age 90); Somerville, Massachusetts
- Political party: Republican

Anne P. Jones (born February 9, 1935) is an American attorney who served as a Commissioner of the Federal Communications Commission from 1979 to 1983.
