= Johannes M. Bauer =

American academic

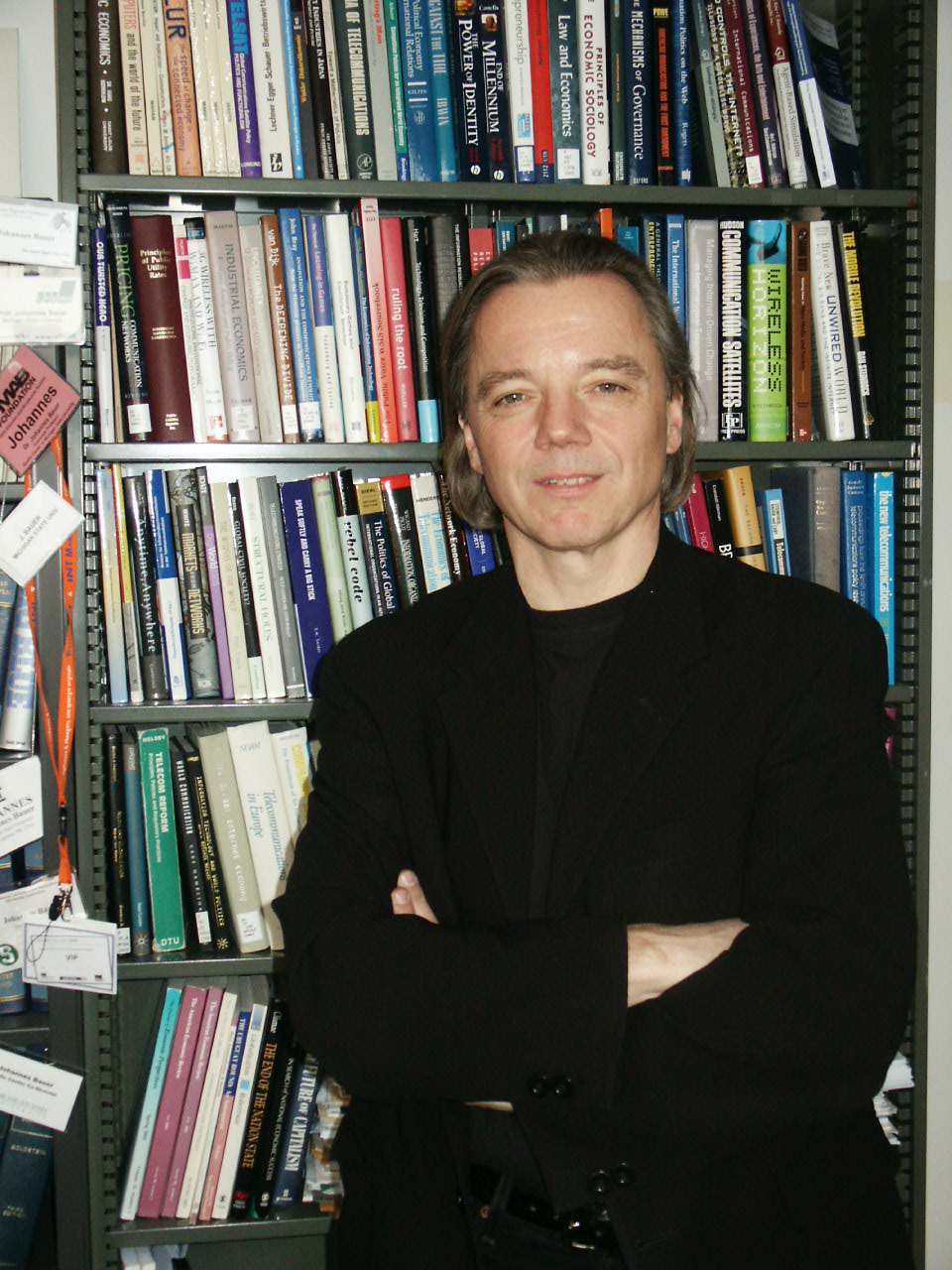
Johannes M. Bauer

Johannes M. Bauer is the Quello Chair for Media and Information Policy in the Department of Media and Information at Michigan State University, East Lansing, Michigan. He also serves as the director of the James H. and Mary B. Quello Center at Michigan State University.

== Education ==
Bauer is a social scientist with Ph.D. and M.A. degrees in economics from the Vienna University of Economics and Business, Vienna, Austria.

== Professional experience ==
Bauer joined Michigan State University in 1990. From 1993 until 1998, he directed the Institute of Public Utilities and Network Industries at the Eli Broad Graduate School of Management at Michigan State University. Between 2001 and 2009, he held several management positions at the Quello Center for Telecommunication Management and Law. Bauer taught and researched as a visiting professor at Delft University of Technology, the Netherlands (2000-2001); the University of Constance, Germany (2010); and the Institute of Media and Communications Research at the University of Zurich, Switzerland (2012). He served as the chairperson of the Department of Media and Information from January 2013 through May 2019.

From September 2023 through 2024 Bauer served as the Chief Economist of the Federal Communications Commission under Chairwoman Jessica Rosenworcel.

== Research ==
His research covers a wide range of issues related to the evolution of communications and information industries, in particular the design and effects of public policies towards these industries, and business strategies in network industries, often from a comparative and international perspective. Ongoing projects address issues of digital inequality with an emphasis on the homework gap, the design of 5G markets and policy, digital innovation, network neutrality, and cybersecurity. Earlier projects dealt with the role of Internet Service Providers in botnet mitigation, the changing role of the state in telecommunications, and the governance of next-generation communications networks and services. Funded, among others, by the U.S. National Science Foundation, the Ford Foundation, the OECD, and the ITU, his work is published in journals such as Telecommunications Policy, Information Economics and Policy, Applied Economics, Government Information Quarterly, Communications & Strategies, Telematics & Informatics, and Info.

== Public service ==
Bauer has worked in advisory capacity with public and private sector organizations in North and South America, Europe, and Asia. He is a frequent speaker at conferences and training programs for professionals from government and industry. Service to the academic community includes roles as consulting editor of Telecommunications Policy, and membership on the editorial boards of Information Economics and Policy, the Journal of Information Policy, and the International Telecommunications Policy Review. From 2010 through 2013, Bauer served as the chairperson of TPRC, the Research Conference on Communications, Information and Internet Policy. He is a member of the Executive Committee of the iSchools Board of Directors and a Member of the International Scientific Advisory Board of LIRNEasia, Colombo, Sri Lanka.

== Entrepreneurship ==
In 2005, he founded Synthesys, Inc., a company specializing on developing practical solutions to complex problems in business and public policy.

== Publications ==
Bauer, J.M. (2018), The Internet and income inequality: socio-economic challenges in a hyperconnected society, Telecommunications Policy, 42(4): 333-343.

Bauer, J.M. & Knieps, G. (2018), Complementary innovation and network neutrality, Telecommunications Policy, 42(2): 172-183.

Garcia-Murillo, M., MacInnes, I., & Bauer, J.M. (2018). Techno-unemployment: A framework for assessing the effects of information and communication technologies on work, Telematics & Informatics, 13(7): 1863-1876.

Bauer, J.M. and Latzer, M. (eds.) (2016), Handbook on the Economics of the Internet, Cheltenham, UK and Northampton, MA: Edward Elgar.

Asghari, H., van Eeten, M.J.G., & Bauer, J.M. (2015), Economics of fighting botnets: Lessons from a decade of mitigation, IEEE Privacy & Security, September/October: 16-23.

Bauer, J.M. (2015), Governing the mobile broadband ecosystem, International Telecommunications Policy Review, 22(2): 1-27.

Bauer, J.M. (2014), Platforms, systems competition, and innovation: reassessing the foundations of communications policy, Telecommunications Policy, 38.

Bauer, J.M., Madden, G., & Morey, A. (2014), Effects of economic conditions and policy interventions on OECD broadband adoption, Applied Economics, 46(12): 1361-1372.

Bauer, J.M. & Obar, J.A. (2014), Reconciling political and economic goals in the net neutrality debate, The Information Society, 30(1), p. 1-19.

LaRose, R., Bauer, J.M., DeMaagd, K., Chew, H.E., Ma, W., & Jung, Y. (2014), Public broadband investment priorities in the United States: an analysis of the Broadband Technology Opportunities Program, Government Information Quarterly, 31(1): 53-64.
