= Dennis R. Patrick =

Dennis Patrick

Chairman of the Federal Communications Commission
- In office April 18, 1987 – August 7, 1989
- President: Ronald Reagan; George H. W. Bush
- Preceded by: Mark Fowler
- Succeeded by: Alfred Sikes

Personal details
- Born: Dennis Roy Patrick; June 1, 1951 (age 75) Los Angeles, California
- Party: Republican
- Education: Occidental College (AB) University of California, Los Angeles (JD)

Dennis Roy Patrick (born June 1, 1951) was the chairman of the FCC from April 18, 1987, through August 7, 1989, appointed by Ronald Reagan, notably helping to finalize the repeal of the Fairness Doctrine. He is president and chief executive of Pillar Productions, an independent film and television production company.

== Background ==
Patrick was born and raised in Los Angeles, California. His father was a 30-year veteran of the Los Angeles Police Department. His hobbies included surfing. He received his A.B. degree magna cum laude from Occidental College in 1973, where he was elected to Phi Beta Kappa and was chairman of the Young Republicans. He earned his J.D. degree from the University of California at Los Angeles in 1976.

== Career ==
While still in law school, Patrick was a clerk to William P. Clark Jr., who was a justice of the California Supreme Court and later was Deputy Secretary of State, US National Security Advisor, and Secretary of the Interior under President Reagan.

Between 1976 and 1981, Patrick practiced law in Los Angeles with the firm Adams, Duque, & Hazeltine. The firm provided environmental coverage, business litigation, and other services to corporate clients. The firm was also known for partner Earl Adams' involvement in Republican election campaigns and hiring Richard Nixon after his unsuccessful 1960 Presidential campaign.

Between 1981 and 1983, Patrick was Associate Director of Presidential Personnel at the White House under President Reagan.

Patrick was nominated to the FCC Commission by President Reagan in late 1983 to fill the seat vacated by President Jimmy Carter appointee Anne P. Jones earlier in May 1983. He received Congressional approval and was sworn in as Commissioner on December 2, 1983. He served on the Commission until April 18, 1987, when he was nominated to the FCC Chairmanship, succeeding Mark Fowler, who had resigned in January. During this period the telecommunications, television, radio, and cable industries underwent significant structural and regulatory reform. Among the issues and reforms engaged were broadcast and cable deregulation, stricter enforcement of decency rules, relaxation of rules governing television program ownership and syndication rights, the introduction of Direct Broadcast Satellite competition and broad telecommunications deregulation. Under Patrick's chairmanship, the FCC controversially voted to abolish the "fairness doctrine", eliminating the requirement that stations provide airtime to both sides of politically divisive issues. Patrick resigned as chairman on April 4, 1989.

From 1990 to 1995, Patrick was CEO of Time Warner Telecommunications, a division of Time Warner Entertainment.

After leaving Time Warner, Patrick founded and was Chief Executive Officer of Milliwave LP, a local exchange telephone company utilizing digital radio frequencies to transmit voice, video, and data in competition with the Regional Bell Operating Companies.

Between 1999 and 2001, Patrick was the president of AOL Wireless and led efforts to expand the ISP's presence to cell phones and other wireless devices.

Between 2001 and 2013, Patrick was president and then as non-executive chairman of National Geographic Ventures, the for-profit division responsible for overseeing National Geographic's film and television production as well as the National Geographic Channel. In 2005 National Geographic Feature Films released March of the Penguins, the second highest-grossing documentary film of all time.

== Personal life ==
Patrick resides in Santa Barbara County, California, where he owns Zaca Creek Ranch, a 1,600-acre cattle ranch. He and his wife have two sons.

Government offices
Preceded by Mark S. Fowler	Chairman of the Federal Communications Commission; April 1987–August 1989	Succeeded by Alfred C. Sikes
