= Alfred C. Sikes =

American government official (born 1939)

Alfred C. Sikes (Al)
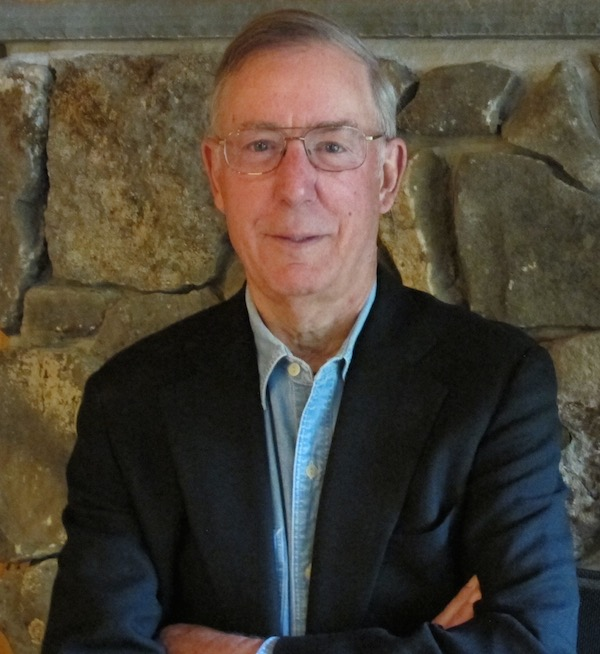

Chairman of the Federal Communications Commission
- In office August 8, 1989 – January 19, 1993
- President: George H. W. Bush
- Preceded by: Dennis R. Patrick
- Succeeded by: James H. Quello

Personal details
- Born: December 16, 1939 (age 86) Cape Girardeau, Missouri
- Party: Unaffiliated
- Spouse: Martha Sikes
- Children: Deborah, Christine, Marcia
- Education: Westminster College (B.A.); University of Missouri School of Law (L.L.B.)
- Occupation: Business consultant

Alfred C. Sikes (born December 16, 1939) is a Republican who served as chairman of the U.S. Federal Communications Commission (FCC) from August 8, 1989, to January 19, 1993 and also served as administrator of the National Telecommunications and Information Administration. He received a B.A. degree for political science from Westminster College in 1961 and an L.L.B. degree from the University of Missouri School of Law in 1964. In 2000, Sikes founded the non-profit Reading Excellence and Discovery Foundation and served as chairman of the Trinity Forum's board of trustees.

== Career ==
Sikes worked at Allen, Woolsey and Fisher, a law firm, from 1964 to 1968, and was assistant Missouri Attorney General from 1969 to 1972. He directed Missouri's Department of Community Affairs from 1973 to 1974, and the state's Department of Consumer Affairs, Regulation, and Licensing from 1974 to 1976. From 1977 to 1985, Sikes worked in the media industry starting, in 1978, Sikes and Associates which owned and managed radio properties and provided consulting services. In 1986, he was nominated by President Reagan to become Assistant Secretary of Commerce and director of the National Telecommunications and Information Administration. U.S. President George H. W. Bush nominated Sikes to be a member of the FCC on June 28, 1989, and he was designated as the commission's chairman after being confirmed by the U.S. Senate.

=== Chairman of the FCC ===
Bush chose Sikes to be chairman over attorney Sherrie P. Marshall, whom he also nominated as a commissioner, because Sikes was thought to have a good relationship with Congress and be more likely to pass the Senate confirmation. During his tenure as FCC chairman, Sikes supported deregulation and established the framework for digital high-definition television. Sikes also carved 100 mHz out of the radio spectrum for new mobile digital services, including radio, telephones, cell phones and satellite radio.

Sikes succeeded Dennis R. Patrick as FCC head, and although his term as a commissioner was scheduled to end on June 30, 1993, Sikes announced his resignation on January 19, 1993. He stepped down to let Democrat Bill Clinton, who had just been elected U.S. President at the time, choose his own FCC head. After Sikes left, James Henry Quello succeeded him as interim chairman. Sikes was hired by the Hearst Corporation in March 1993 to lead the company's New Media & Technology Group, defying earlier speculation about a possible attempt at running for Congress or joining a Washington law firm.

== Personal life ==
Al Sikes was born to Marcia Weber Sikes, who died in 2006, and William Kendall Sikes, who died in 1994. He is married to Martha Sikes and has three daughters, Deborah, Christine, and Marcia. He was described in The New York Times as "mild-mannered." Sikes' family owned a sporting goods store in Sikeston, Missouri, a city founded by his great-great-great-uncle. In October 1992, Sikes was treated for prostate cancer, an event that radio personality Howard Stern mocked after the FCC fined radio station KLSX for broadcasting Stern's program. In 1999, Sikes co-founded READ Foundation, a New York City non profit that provides at-risk youth with one-to-one literacy tutoring. Al Sikes has written the book Culture Leads Leaders Follow published by Koehler Books. He and his wife live in Oxford, Maryland, where he has served on several boards, with a friend started Take The Helm and is the founder of The Monty Alexander Jazz Festival.

Government offices
Preceded by Dennis R. Patrick	Chairman of the Federal Communications Commission; August 1989 – January 1993	Succeeded by James H. Quello
