= William H. Dutton =

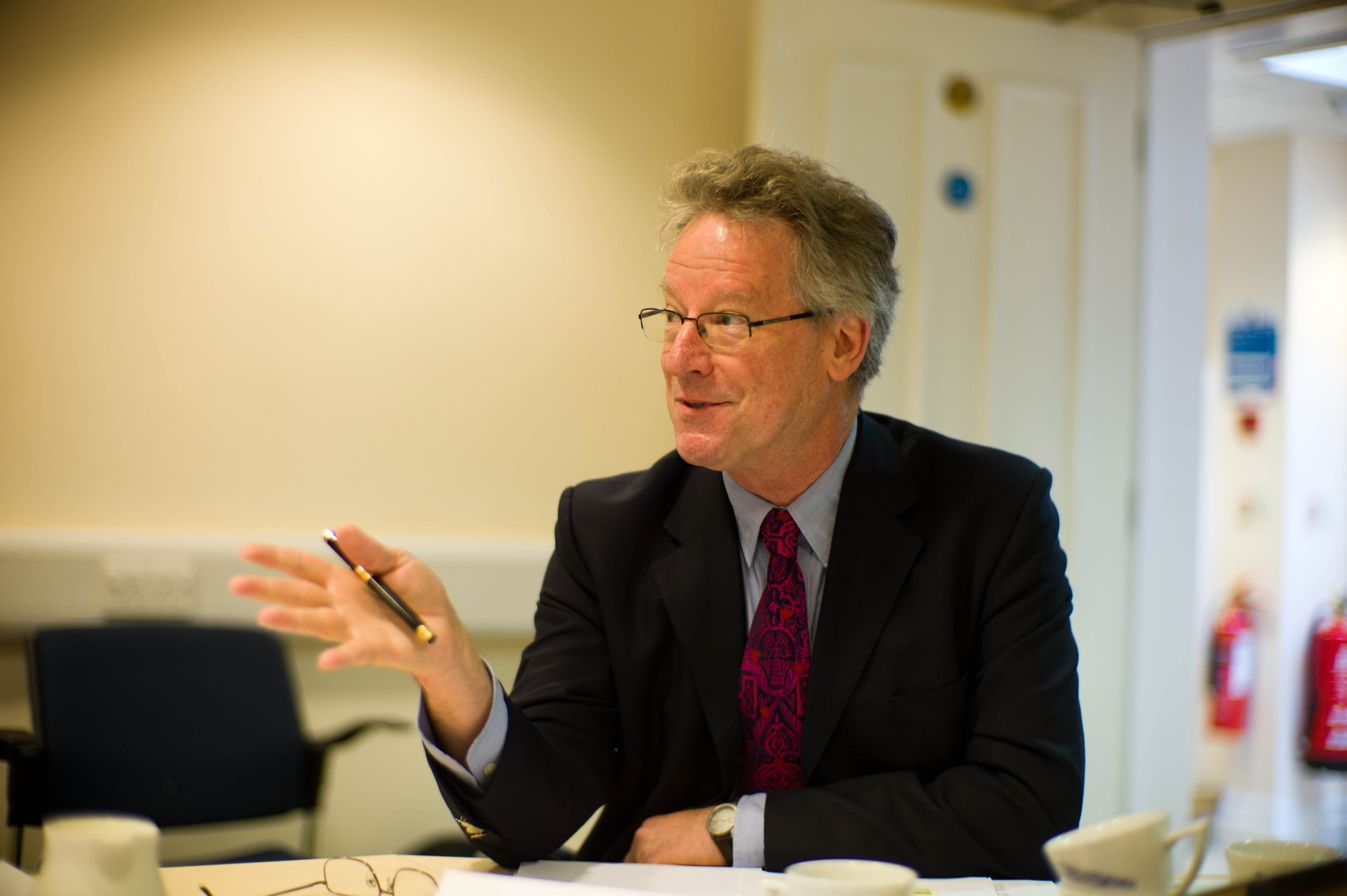
- Born: 1947 (age 78–79)
- Other name: Bill Dutton
- Title: Quello Professor of Media and Information Policy

Academic work
- Discipline: Internet studies; media and information policy
- Institutions: Michigan State University; University of Oxford; University of Southern California
- Notable works: Computers and Politics (1982); The Fifth Estate (2023)
- Website: billdutton.me

William H. Dutton is a British academic known for his contributions to Internet and digital media studies. He is an Oxford Martin Fellow at the University of Oxford, Emeritus Professor at the University of Southern California, and Director of The Portulans Institute. He is best known for being the first Director of the Oxford Internet Institute and first Professor of Internet Studies at the University of Oxford, where he was a Fellow of Balliol College. He also held the James H. Quello Chair in Media and Information Policy at Michigan State University's Department of Media and Information. He was previously a Professor in the Annenberg School for Communication at the University of Southern California, which he joined in 1980, where he was elected President of the USC Faculty.

== Early life and education ==
Dutton was born in the United States and pursued his undergraduate studies at the University of Missouri, where he earned a Bachelor of Arts degree in political science with honors in 1969. He went on to the State University of New York at Buffalo, completing a Master of Arts in 1971 and a Ph.D. in political science in 1974. His doctoral work focused on the role of political institutions and behavior and methodological approaches to the study of politics. In 2002, upon his appointment as Professorial Fellow at Balliol College, he received an M.A. from the University of Oxford.

== Academic career ==
After teaching for a year at the University of South Florida, Dutton became an Assistant Research Professor at the University of California, Irvine, where he worked on one of the earliest major projects examining the role of computers in government. At Irvine, he began integrating his background in political science with the study of computing and the Internet, focusing on their relationship to organizational and societal change.

Dutton began his academic career at the Annenberg School for Communication and Journalism at USC, where he served from 1980 until moving to Oxford in 2002. During his tenure, he was elected President of the Faculty Senate and became an Emeritus Professor upon his departure.

In 2002, Dutton became the first Professor of Internet Studies at the University of Oxford and the founding director of the Oxford Internet Institute, based at Balliol College, a post he held until 2011 as director and until 2014 as professor.

From late 2014 to 2018, Dutton served as the Quello Professor of Media and Information Policy and Director of the Quello Center at MSU's Department of Media and Information Policy. The Quello Center focuses on scholarly research into the intersection of communication, technology, and public policy.

== Research ==
Dutton's research has focused on the social and political implications of the Internet and other information and communication technologies. His early work analyzed the organizational effects of computer systems on local governments in the United States, including studies of urban policy-making, video teleconferencing, and electronic service delivery.

In the 1980s and 1990s, he developed the concept of the "ecology of games" to characterize the interactions among multiple stakeholders in shaping telecommunications and information policy. He also conducted comparative analyses of media and information policy in the United States, Europe, and Japan, contributing to debates on cable television, electronic service delivery, and the development of information societies.

At the Oxford Internet Institute, Dutton broadened his focus to the governance of the Internet and the societal consequences of digital technologies. He has been noted for advancing the concept of the "Fifth Estate," describing digitally networked individuals and communities as a new source of accountability beyond institutions such as the press, government, and civil society organizations. His book The Fifth Estate: The Power Shift of the Digital Age examines the democratic potential of this shift as well as its implications for regulation and cybersecurity.

His subsequent projects have addressed issues including digital divides, the influence of search engines on political opinion, and capacity building in cybersecurity at both national and international levels. He has served as principal investigator or director on research funded by organizations such as the National Science Foundation, the UK Economic and Social Research Council, UNESCO, Google, and the UK Foreign, Commonwealth & Development Office.

In addition to his research, Dutton has played a role in the institutional development of Internet studies. At Oxford, he helped establish the graduate curriculum in the field and launched the Summer Doctoral Programme in Internet Studies. He has also edited and contributed to a number of collections, including The Oxford Handbook of Internet Studies (2013) and Society and the Internet (2014; 2nd ed., 2019).

== Contributions and publications ==
Dutton has edited or guest-edited special issues of academic journals and has served on advisory and editorial boards including Information & Culture, Global Media and Communication, Social Science Computer Review, and Internet Histories. He has also reviewed for a range of journals and publishers and authored reports for international organizations, such as Freedom of Connection, Freedom of Expression (UNESCO, 2011).

His early authored works include Computers and Politics (Oxford University Press, 1982), Modeling as Negotiating (Ablex, 1985), and Social Transformation in an Information Society (UNESCO, 2004).

=== Authored Books ===
- The Fifth Estate: The Power Shift of the Digital Age (OUP, 2023), exploring how digital-age power dynamics challenge regulation and cybersecurity
- Society on the Line: Information Politics in the Digital Age (OUP, 1999)

=== Edited volumes ===
- The Oxford Handbook of Internet Studies (OUP, 2013)
- Society and the Internet: How Networks of Information and Communication are Changing Our Lives (OUP, 2014; 2nd ed. 2019) with Mark Graham
- Four volumes on Politics and the Internet (Routledge, 2014)
- A Research Agenda for Digital Politics (Elgar, 2020)
- Transforming Enterprise: The Economic and Social Implications of Information Technology (MIT, 2005)

== Awards & Honors ==
- Lifetime Achievement Award from OII for his role as its founding director
- First recipient of the International Communication Association's Fred Williams Award for contributions to communication and technology studies
- William F. Ogburn Lifetime Achievement Award, American Sociological Association (2014)
- Elected an ICA Fellow (2015)
- Endowed Faculty Medallion from MSU (2017)
- Fulbright Scholar to Britain, 1986–87
- National Director of the Programme on Information and Communication Technology (PICT), Economic and Social Research Council of Britain, 1993–95
