= Federal-State Joint Conference on Advanced Telecommunications Services =

Intergovernmental advisory board

The Federal-State Joint Conference on Advanced Telecommunications Services also known as the Section 706 Joint Conference on Advanced Services was created by the FCC in 1999, pursuant to section 410(b) of the Communications Act of 1934, with endorsement by the National Association of Regulatory Utility Commissioners (NARUC). Section 706 refers to the Telecommunications act of 1996. In this section the code states that the FCC is to "encourage the deployment on a reasonable and timely basis of advanced telecommunications capability to all Americans." The Joint Conference is intended to serve as a forum for ongoing dialogue among the FCC, state regulators, and local and regional entities about the deployment of advanced telecommunications capabilities, and to identify a set of "Best Practices" that promote rapid deployment, particularly to benefit the underserved. The Joint Conference has held a series of field hearings across the country and has conducted Broadband Summits.

The Joint Conference was originally composed of six commissioners from state public utilities commissions (nominated by NARUC) and five from the FCC. The Joint Conference meets three times a year in closed meetings. In 2003 the FCC raised the number of State Commissioners up to seven, although currently there are just four.

== Members ==
- Commissioner Jessica Rosenworcel, FCC (Joint Conference Federal Chair)
- Chairman Tom Wheeler, FCC
- Commissioner Mignon Clyburn, FCC (former Joint Conference Federal Chair)
- Commissioner Ajit Pai, FCC
- Commissioner Michael O'Rielly, FCC
- Commissioner Betty Ann Kane, District of Columbia Public Service Commission
- Commissioner Catherine J.K. Sandoval, California Public Utilities Commission
- Commissioner Swati Dandekar, Iowa Utilities Board
- Commissioner Gregg C. Sayre, New York State Public Service Commission

== Former members ==
- Chairman William E. Kennard, FCC (former Joint Conference Federal Chair)
- Commissioner Kevin J. Martin, FCC (former Joint Conference Federal Chair)
- Commissioner Susan Ness, FCC
- Commissioner Harold Furchtgott-Roth, FCC
- Commissioner Gloria Tristani, FCC
- Chairman Michael K. Powell, FCC,
- Commissioner Kathleen Q. Abernathy, FCC
- Commissioner Michael J. Copps, FCC
- Commissioner Jonathan S. Adelstein, FCC
- Chairman Julius Genachowski, FCC
- Commissioner Robert M. McDowell, FCC
- Commissioner G. Nanette Thompson, Regulatory Commission of Alaska
- Commissioner Irma Muse Dixon, Louisiana Public Service Commission
- Chair Jo Anne Sanford, North Carolina Utilities Commission.
- Chairman Bob Rowe, Montana Public Service Commission
- Commissioner Susan P. Kennedy, California Public Utilities Commission
- Chairman Thomas L. Welch, Maine Public Utilities Commission
- Chairman Deborah T. Tate, Tennessee Regulatory Authority
- Commissioner Larry S. Landis, Indiana Utility Regulatory Commission
- Commissioner Randy Mitchell, South Carolina Public Service Commission
- Commissioner Geoffrey G. Why, Massachusetts Department of Telecommunications and Cable
- Commissioner Stephen Michael Bloom, Oregon Public Utility Commission
- Chairman Robert M. Clayton III, Missouri Public Service Commission
- Chairman Carlito P. Caliboso, Hawaii Public Utilities Commission
- Commissioner Rachelle Chong, California Public Utilities Commission
- Commissioner Michael Moffet, Kansas Corporation Commission
- Deputy Chair Steve Furtney, Wyoming Public Service Commission
- Commissioner Lila Jaber, Florida Public Service Commission
- Commissioner Brett Perlman, Public Utility Commission of Texas

== Events ==
- 3/8/2000 Meeting of Joint Conference and Initial Hearing - Washington DC
- 4/17/2000 Western Regional Field Hearing, Anchorage, Alaska
- 4/19/2000 Midwestern Regional Field Hearing, Sioux City, Nebraska
- 5/22/2000 Northeastern Regional Field Hearing, Lowell, Massachusetts
- 6/9/2000 Gulf States and Southeast Regional Field Hearing, Miami, Florida
- 6/21/2000 Field Hearing, Montana State University
- 6/23/2000 Mountain West Regional Field Hearing, Cheyenne, Wyoming
- 11/06/2008 Broadband Summit: Connecting America - San Jose, California
- 2/7/2013 Broadband Summit: Broadband Adoption and Usage - What Have We Learned? - Washington, DC
- 11/19/2014 Panel on the FCC's Open Internet Proposals, Section 706, the Communications Act and the Role of the States
- 7/15/2015 Best Practices in Changing Times - New York, New York

== Reports ==
- 11/06/2002 Broadband Services In The United States: An Analysis of Availability and Demand - prepared by the Florida Public Service Commission, Office of Market Monitoring and Strategic Analysis.
