= JPay =

Financial services provider

JPay Inc.
- JPay company logo
- Company type: Subsidiary
- Industry: Inmate video visitation, financial services for the prison market
- Founded: 2002
- Headquarters: Miramar, Florida
- Number of employees: 250
- Parent: Securus Technologies
- Website: JPay.com

JPay is a privately held information technology and financial services provider focused on serving the United States prison system. With headquarters in Miramar, Florida, the company contracts with state, county, and federal prisons and jails to provide technologies and services including money transfer, email, video visitation and parole and probation payments to approximately 1.5 million inmates throughout 35 states.

== History ==
JPay was started in 2002 by the company's CEO and founder, Ryan Shapiro. In 2005, the company moved its headquarters from New York to Miami.

In 2009, JPay's services expanded to offer an inmate MP3 player, the JP3, and a library of music tracks for purchase.

In 2011, JPay moved its headquarters from Miami to Miramar, Florida, to accommodate a larger call center.

In 2012, JPay launched a tablet, the JP4, designed for the prison industry, which enables inmates to read and draft emails, play games, and listen to music. It also allows inmates to view and attach photos and videograms. The decision to permit use of the JP4, and the full extent of its functions, is made by the state corrections departments. JPay's tablet has been distributed in seven DOC agencies, including North Dakota, Georgia, Florida, Louisiana, Virginia, Michigan and Washington.

In April 2015, JPay was acquired by Securus Technologies though terms of the agreement were kept secret.

== Products and services ==
=== Money transfer ===
An inmate's friend or family member can use JPay's money transfer service to deposit money to the inmate's commissary or trust account. JPay offers electronic payment and deposit options which include credit and debit card payments via online, phone, and mobile app channels. The company has a relationship with MoneyGram to accept cash at MoneyGram's U.S. agent locations, like Walmart and CVS/pharmacy. Additionally, the company processes money orders on behalf of its contracted agencies.

=== Communications and inmate devices ===
JPay provides services that an inmate and an inmate's family and friends can use to communicate, such as video visitation, email, videogram, instant messaging, and a tablet computer ("J8P5").

=== Parole and probation payments ===
JPay provides payment services for offenders to make community corrections and court-ordered payments. As part of its parole and probationary services, JPay also offers a release card (JPay Progress Card), which is a prepaid, reloadable MasterCard. While all agencies contract to use JPay for money transfer services, they do not all utilize JPay's full ranges of services.

=== Charitable donations ===
JPay has been one of the corporate supporters of the Creative Corrections Education Foundation, a nonprofit founded by a former Texas warden, which collects contributions from prison inmates and from corporate sponsors to fund scholarships for children of prison inmates. In 2014, the charity reported having provided $63,000 in scholarships over the previous two years.

== Criticisms ==
=== State licensing violations ===
In 2012, the Pennsylvania Department of Banking fined JPay $80,000 for violating the state's Money Transmitter Act by failing to have the necessary state license since it began operating in the state in 2004. As of 2014, JPay had been fined a total of $408,500 across seven states for operating unlicensed businesses.

=== Intellectual property claims ===
In February 2015, Valerie Buford sued the Indiana Department of Corrections after she learned that her brother, Leon Benson, had been placed in solitary confinement, had good conduct time deducted, and had JPay access revoked after she had reposted a videogram sent via JPay on a Facebook page campaigning for his release. Although access was later restored, Buford continued to argue that the actions had a chilling effect on her ability to communicate with Benson. Officials of the prison claimed the actions were to "protect" JPay's intellectual property; at the time, its terms of use stated that JPay held the copyright to any content that was sent through its systems, regardless of its original author. Following a May 2015 posting by the Electronic Frontier Foundation that criticized the company for attempting to abuse copyright law, JPay amended its terms of use to no longer contain this clause.

=== Debit card fees ===
Senator Cory Booker vowed to ask the Consumer Financial Protection Bureau to intercede on behalf of inmates against JPay's allegedly predatory practices with its prepaid debit release cards which are often the only form in which released prisoners are permitted to collect their prison earnings and remaining commissary balances. Allegedly, the company deducts non-optional fees which can exceed 40% of the funds owed to released inmates.

=== Kickbacks ===
In approximately half of the states it operates in, contracts between the various state prison systems or individual prisons and JPay include an agreement to apportion part of the fees, collected from those sending money to the prisoners, back to the prison operators in exchange for giving JPay a monopoly over financial transfers to inmates. According to state mandated disclosures in Illinois, correctional institution operators there received approximately $48,000 for 2013 in what company founder Shapiro prefers to call "commissions". One prisoner, released in 2010 following a 28-year incarceration for murder, identified the potential hardship on the poorest families, leaving a mother of three with a husband in jail to decide: "Do I send money to him so he can afford to stay in touch with the kids, or do I feed the kids?" Meanwhile, JPay funds lavish parties for corrections institute bureaucrats during the American Correctional Association's annual convention, providing "tequila, hand-rolled cigars" and "live mariachi band" as well as sponsoring an award, including a trip, presented by the Association of State Correctional Administrators to former state corrections directors.

At the political level, despite many of JPay's contracts explicitly banning lobbying, Shapiro says the company's lawyers approved JPay's hiring registered state lobbyists and spending $20,000 lobbying Washington in attempts to take the federal prisons' financial transactions contract from Bank of America. A Master Contract between JPay and the National Association of State Procurement Officials and the Multi-State Corrections Procurement Alliance, valid until July 2015, set out kickback rates, to any state signing on, of 50¢ per inbound money transfer to prisoners, 5¢ per outbound email, $5 per MP3 device, $10 per JP5 Tablet device, and 5% of JPay's music download fees (which are 30% – 50% higher than iTunes).
