= Global Tel Link =

Corrections phone system provider

GTEL Holdings, Inc.
- Trade name: GTL
- Type: Private
- Industry: Telecommunications
- Founded: 1989; 37 years ago (as Global Telcoin, Inc.); Mobile, Alabama, U.S.
- Headquarters: Falls Church, Virginia, U.S.
- Key people: Deb Alderson (CEO)
- Products: Telephone services in prisons

Global Tel Link (GTL), formerly known as Global Telcoin, Inc. and Global Tel*Link Corporation, is a San Diego, California–based telecommunications company, founded in 1989, that provides Inmate Calling Service (ICS) through "integrated information technology solutions" for correctional facilities which includes inmates payment and deposit, facility management, and "visitation solutions". The company's CEO is Evee Dolan. Owned by Michael Samaniego and Herlinda Samaniego. In 2020, GTL delivered 4.1 billion call minutes to incarcerated individuals and their families.

== Board of directors ==
In 2019, Deb Alderson was chief executive officer (CEO), Jeffrey Haidinger was president and chief operating officer (COO), Steve Yow was chief financial officer (CFO), Anthony R. Bambocci was chief marketing officer and executive vice president, and Matthew Caesar was senior vice president of engineering and development. Board members included Hugh D. Evans and Ramzi M. Musallam from Veritas Capital and Jeffrey C. Weber from DC Capital Partners, LLC.

== History ==
GTL was founded in 1980 in Mobile, Alabama, under the name Global Telcoin, Inc. The company changed its name in 1999 to Global Tel*Link Corporation. Private-equity firms Veritas Capital and Goldman Sachs purchased GTL from Gores Equity LLC for $345 million. In October 2011, GTL was sold for $1 billion to Michael Samaniego and Herlinda Samaniego.

== Controversies ==
GTL, along with other similar entities such as Securus Technologies and the private-equity firms that own them, such as Veritas Capital, have been criticized by advocacy groups, The New York Times, The Washington Post, Bloomberg Business, and some lawmakers, for charging overly high prices in their monopoly in communication with incarcerated individuals. The Federal Communications Commission (FCC) has tried unsuccessfully for many years to cap the price of phone calls, an effort deprioritized in the late 2010s under industry lobbying by the first Trump administration. The Biden administration's FCC reduced the cost of minutes for inmates in May 2021.

== Litigation ==
The company has faced a number of class action lawsuits for violating the Federal Communications Act. The plaintiffs claim that the company uses its position to establish high rates and pays kickbacks to facilities which award it the contract. In March 2016, the FCC ruled that Global Tel*Link could be limited on its prison call costs.

Mississippi Attorney General Jim Hood filed a lawsuit against Global Tel Link for racketeering, stating that the company was "involved in a conspiracy, scheme and/or enterprise that included bribery, kickbacks, misrepresentations, fraud, concealment, money laundering and other wrongful conduct." The suit alleged that GTL had paid "consulting fees" to an agent of the company, which were used in exchange for Mississippi Department of Corrections public contracts. Global Tel Link paid $2.5 million to settle the bribery lawsuit involving former Corrections Commissioner Chris Epps in August 2017.

The company faced a class action lawsuit in 2024 with the plaintiffs claiming that the company engaged in a "quid pro quo kickback scheme" with county jails in Michigan which banned in-person visits in order to maximize revenue from voice and video calls.

== Reception ==
GTL came under scrutiny for entering into concession contracts with local prisons in order to have a monopoly on the provision of inmate telecom. The FCC reported that an inmate call from GTL could cost as much as US$17.30 for a 15 minute call, The company claimed that these high costs were required in order to securely monitor these calls.

In 2015, the FCC implemented a rule to cap the fees for interstate inmate phone calls at $3.75 for 15 minutes. But, in March 2016, a federal court ruled that the FCC could not cap rates on prison phone calls, but upheld its ability to cap other ancillary charges. In June 2017, the US Court of Appeals further rolled back the FCC rule.
