= Managed access =

Managed access may refer to:

- Managed access (corrections), a technology to limit the uses of mobile phones in prison
- Expanded access, a program to allow the use of unapproved drugs by people with serious conditions
- Access management, the regulation of access to roadways
