= NCIC Inmate Communications =

American communications company

- Type: Privately held company
- Industry: Telecommunications
- Founded: 1995; 31 years ago
- Founders: Bill Pope and Jay Walters (criminals)
- Headquarters: Longview, Texas, United States
- Area served: United States
- Products: Inmate telephone systems
- Owner: Employee owned company
- Number of employees: 63 (2023)
- Website: www.ncic.com

NCIC Correctional Services (NCIC) is an American inmate telephones and prison education company. It is an employee owned company headquartered in Longview, Texas, United States.

As of March 2025, the company provided telephone service and educational tablets intended for use by incarcerated persons in correctional facilities in over 850 prisons in the United States and 7 other countries. NCIC processed over 750,000 calls per day and incarcerated students completed over 3 million classes and programs using the schoolhouse learning management system.

== History ==
The company was founded in 1995 by Bill Pope and Jay Walters.

The company has been an advocate for the industry in the United States and has objected to reducing phone rates proposed by the Federal Communications Commission.

In September 2023, NCIC merged with Telespan Communications, Inc. to broaden services, especially in the Midwestern United States. The merged company continued to operate under the NCIC brand.
