= Inmate telephone system =

Phone systems for the incarcerated

An inmate telephone system, also known as an Inmate Calling Service (ICS) or Inmate telephone service, is a telephone service intended for use by inmates in correctional facilities in the United States. The service is intended to support inmate rehabilitation by allowing consistent communication with their family and legal counsel while incarcerated.

In the United States, prison telecom is a $1.2 billion industry, mostly controlled by two private equity-backed companies: Global Tel Link (GTL) and Securus Technologies. While there have been attempts by the United States' telecom regulator, the FCC, to regulate the costs of inmate telephone services, the Court of Appeals for the D.C. Circuit ruled that its policy violated the Telecommunications Act, which forbids the FCC from regulating intrastate communications.

== Operation ==
In order to use an inmate telephone service, inmates must register an account and provide a list of names and numbers for the people they intend to communicate with. Call limitations vary depending on the prison's rules, but calls are typically limited to 15 minutes each, and inmates must wait 30 minutes before being allowed to make another call. Calls are generally recorded and monitored by the prison’s staff for security and oversight purposes. Phone credits are typically accessed via an inmate account card.

Since 2001, the Federal Bureau of Prisons has limited calls to 300 minutes per month. As of 2025, the system gives 300 free minutes to any adult inmate who participates in a First Step Act (FSA) Evidence-Based Recidivism Reduction (EBRR) program, but they must pay for their phone minutes if they are not in a program.

== Providers ==
In the United States, the inmate telephone market is dominated by two providers, Global Tel Link (GTL) and Securus Technologies, with Global Tel-Link controlling approximately 50% of the market and Securus with 20%. The New York-based private equity firm Veritas Capital, with assets of over $5 billion, acquired GTL during the tenure of Veritas' founder and CEO Robert B. McKeon. Mobile, Alabama-based GTL was a subsidiary of GTEL Holdings in 2009 and offered "inmate communications, investigative, facility management, visitation, payment and deposit, and content solutions."

The global private-equity company Castle Harlan purchased Securus Technologies from Miami-based private equity company, H.I.G. Capital in 2011. New York-based American Securities purchased GTL for $1 billion in 2011, and then Boston-based ABRY Partners purchased Securus in 2013 for $640 million.

== Service rates ==
Rates for the telephone calls from prisons and jails can be exorbitantly high, especially for low income families who are trying to keep in touch with their loved ones. Data has shown over the course of 10 years leading up to 2021, phone call per-minute rates have steadily declined; however, the rates are still generally too high for many people to stay in contact. Contributing to the high cost is the fact that providers charge two separate rates depending on whether the callers are from the same state or different states.

On August 9, 2013, the Federal Communications Commission adopted a report on the high cost of inmate calling services and proposed reforms. A 2013 FCC analysis described how, in some cases, long-distance calls are charged six times the rate for the equivalent call on the outside, or in other instances, a 15-minute call could cost upwards of $15. Acting Chairwoman Clyburn, Jessica Rosenworcel and Ajit Pai dissented and issued statements about their dissent. It also reported that phone rates had "caused inmates and their friends and families to subsidize everything from inmate welfare to salaries and benefits, states' general revenue funds and personnel training." At that time the FCC proposed capping the charge for interstate inmate phone calls at $3.75 for 15 minutes. The proposal was approved in 2014; a cap was also implemented to reduce the high long-distance charges that inmates incurred to eleven cents per minute, so that a 15-minute call should not cost more than $4. According to the FCC, Global Tel-Link had been charging as much as $17.30 for such calls under contracts with facilities in Arkansas, Georgia and Minnesota, which resulted in "unreasonably high" phone bills for inmates' families. In retaliation for the change, service providers raised the rates on local calls.

In 2015, the FCC imposed new caps of 11¢ to 22¢ on all inmate calls. The decision was criticized by the industry, which felt that the capped prices would be insufficient to cover the commissions they must pay. By March, the new caps had been stayed pending the result of a lawsuit against the FCC filed by providers, but the FCC stated that it would enforce the existing caps on intrastate calls as well. In September 2015, Human Rights Watch requested that Michael Fisch, CEO of American Securities, the private equity group that owned GTL, step down from their board of directors as "GTL's exploitation of the ability of prisoners to communicate with their families and children is the antithesis of upholding human dignity and advancing human rights, and is in direct conflict with Human Rights Watch's mission."

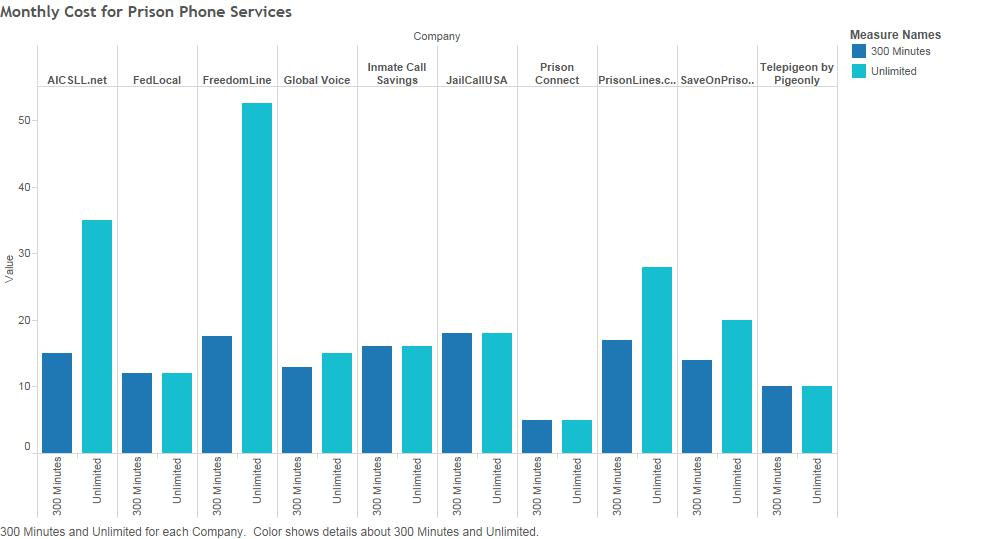
Private Prison Phone Company Rates per Month. Data from: Prison Call Deals

In November 2016, the Court of Appeals for the District of Columbia Circuit granted a stay, requested by Securus, to block a proposed compromise by the FCC to set the rate cap to 13¢ to 31¢ per-minute on inter- and intrastate calls. In the wake of the stay, Ajit Pai criticized Democrats for appealing and the courts for intervening on ICS rate regulations. The two ICS providers, GTL and CenturyLink, asked for a delay in another FCC hearing in Washington that was originally set for February 6, 2017. By January 19, 2017, the D.C. Circuit still refused to pause the FCC challenge to reform inmate calling rates. Commissioners Ajit Pai, Mignon Clyburn, and Jessica Rosenworcel, who were on the August 2013 Commission when the reform report was adopted, had dissented in 2013 and were considered likely to find for GTL and CenturyLink.

Upon the start of the first Trump administration, both Rosenworcel and Pai were nominated to the FCC. In his first week as chairman, Pai began to roll back, or declare his intent to roll back, a number of pro-consumer policies implemented by the FCC during the Obama administration (such as Net neutrality). As a result, Pai instructed the FCC's lawyers to cease defending the commission's actions in court. On June 13, 2017, the Appeals Court ruled in favor of Global Tel Link, arguing that the FCC's attempt to regulate the pricing of intrastate prison calls exceeded its authority under the Telecommunications Act of 1996, which forbids the FCC from regulating intrastate communications.

In June 2019, U.S. Sen. Tammy Duckworth introduced the Martha Wright-Reed Just and Reasonable Communications Act, which would once again authorize the FCC to regulate prison phones and cap the rate of calls made from state and local prisons. It was passed by Congress and signed by President Joe Biden in January 2023.

In November 2023, Massachusetts became the fifth state to approve free jail and prison phone calls in the nation.

== Telephone privileges ==
In the 1970s, inmates were limited to about one personal telephone call every three months. Today, inmates can make calls almost any time during the day if they have the necessary funds, but there are other restrictions. With the exception of calls made between inmates and their attorneys, most phone calls made by an inmate to an outside source are monitored and recorded for safety and security purposes. Telephone privileges are limited out of concern that inmates will use prison phones to engage in criminal activity.

== See also ==
- Prison commissary – Store within a prison
