= Geoffrey Starks =

American politician

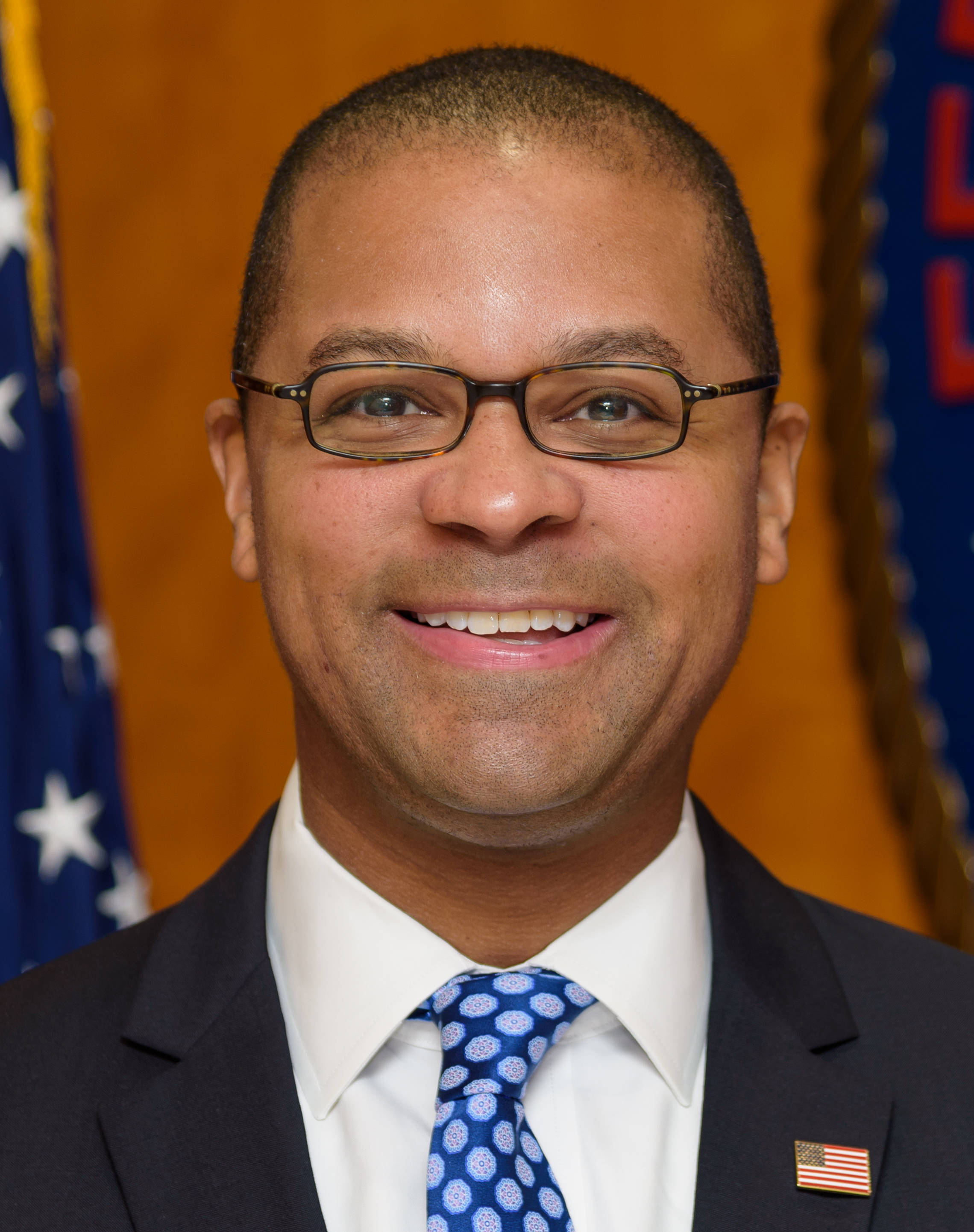

Member of the Federal Communications Commission
- In office January 30, 2019 – June 6, 2025
- President: Donald Trump; Joe Biden
- Preceded by: Mignon Clyburn
- Succeeded by: Vacant

Personal details
- Born: Geoffrey Adam Starks; March 13, 1980 (age 46) Kansas City, Missouri, U.S.
- Party: Democratic
- Spouse: Lauren
- Children: 2
- Education: Harvard University (BA); Yale University (JD)

Geoffrey Adam Starks (born March 13, 1980) is an American lawyer who served as a Commissioner of the United States Federal Communications Commission (FCC). He was nominated by President Donald Trump to succeed Mignon Clyburn who announced on April 19, 2018, that she was going to step down on June 6, 2018. Starks was unanimously confirmed by the United States Senate on January 2, 2019. He was sworn into office on January 30, 2019. Starks is affiliated with the Democratic Party. He was renominated by President Joe Biden for a new term and was confirmed by the Senate on September 30, 2023. On March 18, 2025, he announced his intent to retire in the spring of 2025.

== Early life and education ==
Starks is a native of and was born in Kansas City, Missouri and raised in Kansas. He earned an A.B, degree from Harvard College and a Juris Doctor from Yale Law School.

== Career ==
Prior to Stark's entry into federal public service, he was an attorney at the law firm Williams & Connolly, clerked for the Honorable Judge Duane Benton on the United States Court of Appeals for the Eighth Circuit, served as a legislative staffer in the Illinois State Senate, and worked as a financial analyst. Thereafter, he was senior counsel in the Office of the Deputy Attorney General at the U.S. Department of Justice (DOJ) where he provided advice on domestic and international law enforcement issues, including civil, criminal, and national security matters. At DOJ, he received the Attorney General Award for Exceptional Service. Starks continued his career as Assistant Bureau Chief in the FCC's Enforcement Bureau, where he focused on protecting consumers, promoting network security, and preserving the integrity of the commission's Universal Service Fund programs.

In June 2018, President Trump nominated Geoffrey Starks to fill a Democratic seat on the FCC. He was confirmed by the Senate in January 2019.

In May 2023, President Biden nominated Starks to a new term that would end on July 1, 2027 and he was confirmed by the Senate on September 30, 2023. He resigned from the commission in June 2025.

== Personal life ==
Starks lives in Washington, D.C., with his wife, Lauren and their two children.
