= Jessica Rosenworcel =

American lawyer (born 1971)

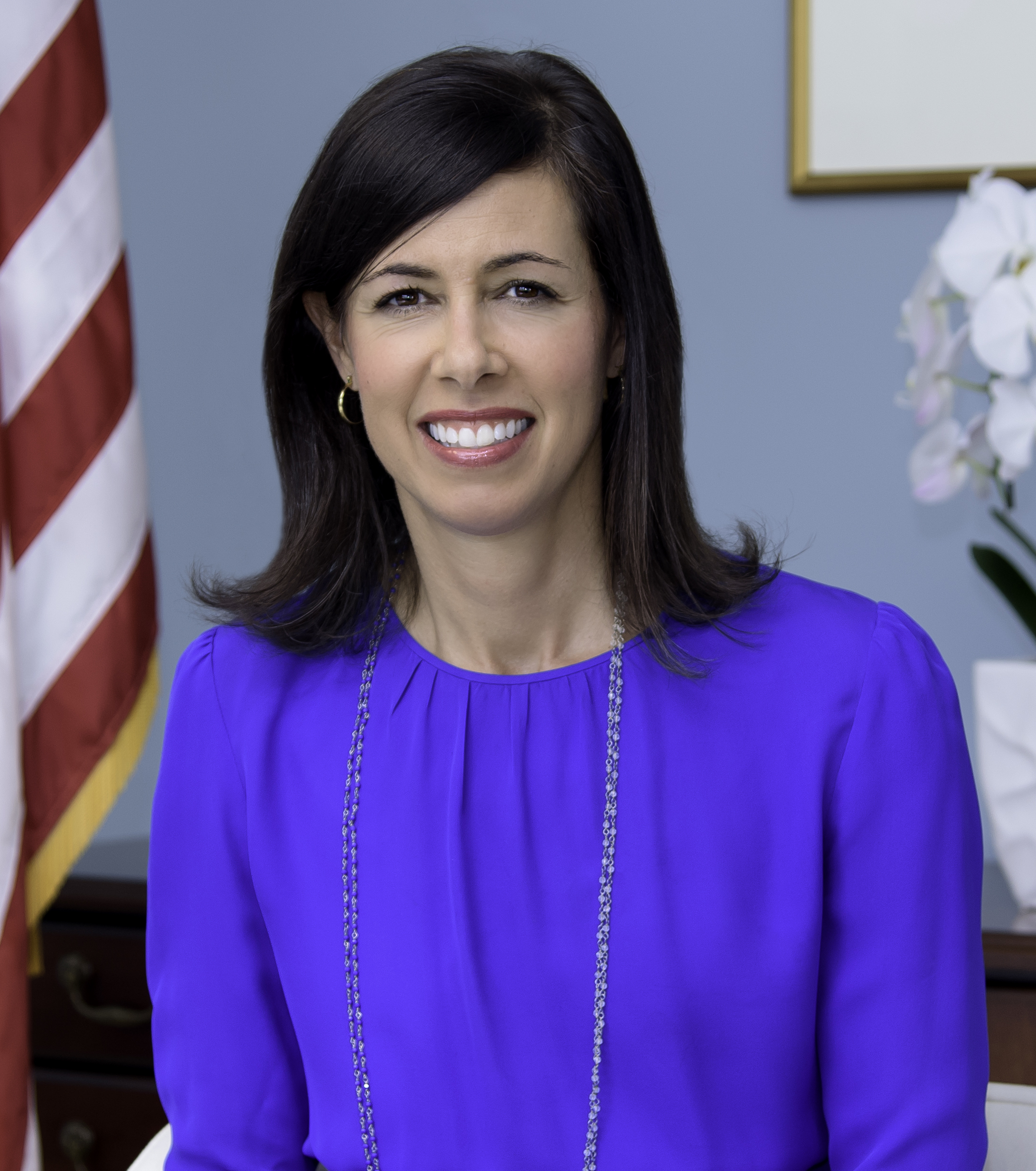
- Rosenworcel in 2018

Chair of the Federal Communications Commission
- In office January 20, 2021 – January 20, 2025; Acting: January 20, 2021 – October 26, 2021
- President: Joe Biden
- Preceded by: Ajit Pai
- Succeeded by: Brendan Carr

Commissioner of the Federal Communications Commission
- In office August 11, 2017 – January 20, 2025
- President: Donald Trump; Joe Biden
- Preceded by: Herself
- Succeeded by: Olivia Trusty
- In office May 11, 2012 – January 3, 2017
- President: Barack Obama
- Preceded by: Michael Copps
- Succeeded by: Herself

Personal details
- Born: July 12, 1971 (age 55) West Hartford, Connecticut, U.S.
- Party: Democratic
- Children: 2
- Relatives: Brian Rosenworcel (brother)
- Education: Wesleyan University (BA); New York University (JD)

Jessica Rosenworcel (born July 12, 1971) is an American attorney who served as a member and chair of the Federal Communications Commission (FCC). She originally served on the FCC from May 11, 2012, to January 3, 2017, and was confirmed by the Senate for an additional term on August 3, 2017. She was named to serve as acting chair in January 2021 and designated permanent chair in October 2021. She was confirmed for another term by the Senate in December 2021. In August 2025, she was named executive director of the MIT Media Lab.

== Early life and education ==
Rosenworcel was born to Willa (née Linoff) and Elliot Rosenworcel, she grew up Jewish in West Hartford, Connecticut, and in 1989, graduated from Hall High School. She graduated from Wesleyan University in 1993 with a Bachelor of Arts degree in economics and English literature, then studied law at the New York University School of Law, graduating with a Juris Doctor in 1997.

== Early career ==
After law school, Rosenworcel was an associate at the law firm Drinker Biddle & Reath (now Faegre Drinker), where she worked in communications law. In 1999, she joined the Wireline Competition Bureau of the FCC, and in 2003 started working for then-FCC Commissioner Michael Copps. Starting in 2007, she served as Senior Communications Counsel to the United States Senate Committee on Commerce, Science, and Transportation, under the leadership of Senator John D. Rockefeller IV (D–WV).

She previously served in the same role on the Committee under the leadership of Senator Daniel Inouye (D–HI). In 2013, Rockefeller led a push to have Rosenworcel named to be the first female chairwoman of the commission when former Chairman Julius Genachowski stepped down, although the position was ultimately given to Tom Wheeler.

== Federal Communications Commission ==
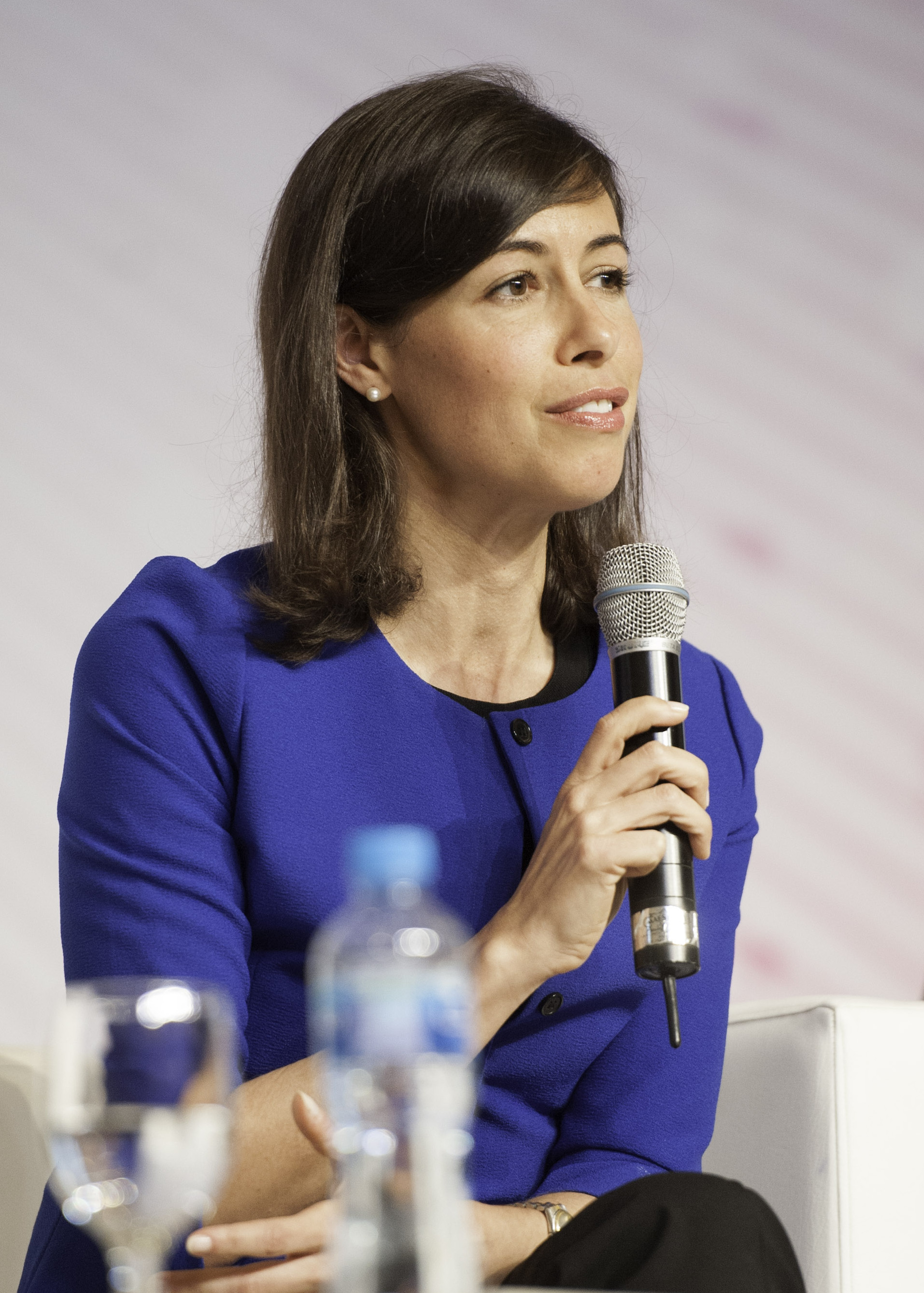
Rosenworcel in 2014

Rosenworcel was first nominated to the FCC by President Barack Obama in October 2011. Her confirmation was delayed for months when Republican Senator Chuck Grassley refused to bring it up for a vote until the FCC released documents about a project he opposed. She was confirmed unanimously by the United States Senate on May 7, 2012, and sworn into office on May 11, 2012, for a term ending June 30, 2015.

On July 13, 2012, Politico designated Rosenworcel as one of 50 politicos to watch, describing her as "whip-smart and intensely serious".

By law, commissioners may continue serving until the appointment of their replacements, but not beyond the end of the next session of Congress following term expiration. In May 2015, President Obama renominated Rosenworcel for a second term, but she was not reconfirmed by the Senate by the time she was required to leave her seat in January 2017. In June 2017, Rosenworcel was nominated to an additional term by President Donald Trump. She was confirmed by the Senate on August 3, 2017.

Following the election of Joe Biden as president, Biden named Rosenworcel as his choice to become chairperson of the FCC after the departure of prior chairman Ajit Pai with the change in administration. Biden named Rosenworcel to serve as acting chairwoman in the interim, making her the second-ever woman to serve in this position. Biden later named Rosenworcel to be the permanent FCC Chairwoman in October 2021, making her the first female to hold the permanent chairperson position on the FCC, and she was confirmed by the Senate on December 7, 2021, for another term as commissioner. She resigned from the FCC in January 2025.

Rosenworcel served as the Chairwoman of the Federal-State Joint Conference on Advanced Telecommunications Services, a forum for dialogue among the FCC, state regulators, and local and regional entities about the deployment of advanced telecommunications capabilities. In 2022, Rosenworcel announced new plans to create a space bureau within the FCC to address the increased number of satellite launches.

=== Positions ===
During her initial term as an FCC commissioner, Rosenworcel voted to enforce net neutrality by classifying Internet service providers as Title II common carriers, overturn state laws that protect Internet service providers against competition from municipal broadband, change the technical definition of "broadband" from 4 Mbit/s to 25 Mbit/s, use the LifeLine program to subsidize Internet access for low-income individuals, and expand consumer protection against robocalls. On the latter topic, Rosenworcel in 2019 argued that the FCC should order telecommunications companies to provide free call-blocking services. On March 17, 2021, she kicked off an anti-robocall agenda. This agenda includes issuing significant fines to companies, demanding cease-and-desist, and launching a Robocall Response Team.

On net neutrality, Rosenworcel said, "We cannot have a two-tiered Internet with fast lanes that speed the traffic of the privileged and leave the rest of us lagging behind. We cannot have gatekeepers who tell us what we can and cannot do and where we can and cannot go online, and we do not need blocking, throttling, or paid prioritization schemes that undermine the Internet as we know it."

Rosenworcel has been a champion of updating national education policy in order to connect the country's schools and libraries with high-speed Internet. In addition, Rosenworcel is responsible for coining the term "homework gap", and has brought attention to the need of students to get online when they are outside of school.

Rosenworcel supports proposals to improve communications infrastructure and location accuracy for 911 calls from cell phones, and supports the expansion of FirstNet, a dedicated wireless network for emergency services workers.

== Post-FCC career ==
In August 2025, Rosenworcel was appointed executive director of the MIT Media Lab.

== Personal life ==
Rosenworcel lives in Washington, D.C., with her husband and two children. She is the sister of Brian Rosenworcel, the drummer for the band Guster.

Political offices
Preceded by Ajit Pai	Chair of the Federal Communications Commission; 2021–2025	Succeeded by Brendan Carr
