= Mignon Clyburn =

American government official (born 1962)

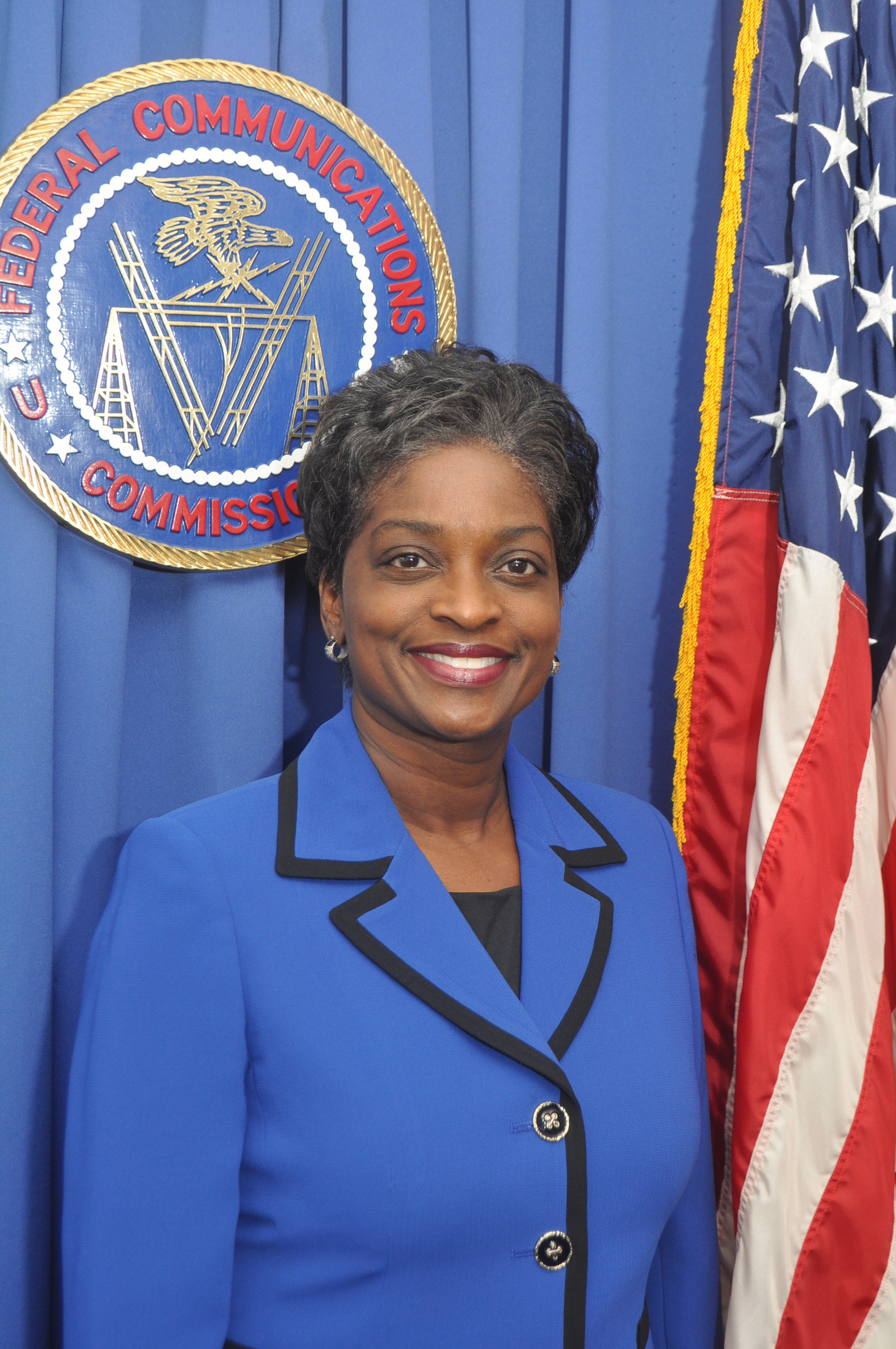

Commissioner of the Federal Communications Commission
- In office August 3, 2009 – June 6, 2018
- President: Barack Obama; Donald Trump
- Preceded by: Deborah Tate
- Succeeded by: Geoffrey Starks

Personal details
- Born: Mignon Letitia Clyburn; March 22, 1962 (age 64) Charleston, South Carolina, U.S.
- Party: Democratic
- Relations: Jennifer Clyburn Reed (sister)
- Parent: Jim Clyburn (father)
- Education: University of South Carolina (BS)

Mignon Letitia Clyburn (born March 22, 1962) is an American former government official who served as a member of the Federal Communications Commission (FCC) from 2009 to 2018. In May 2013, she became Acting Chairwoman of the FCC, serving until November 2013, and was the first woman to lead the agency.

In December 2017, Clyburn and fellow Democratic commissioner Jessica Rosenworcel notably voted against rescinding the FCC's 2015 Open Internet Order, better known as net neutrality; the measure passed in a 3-2 party line vote to remove net neutrality protections. In April 2018, Clyburn announced that she would step down from her position as commissioner and served until June 6, 2018.

Clyburn is the daughter of U.S. Representative Jim Clyburn. In 2019, Clyburn was hired by T-Mobile to advise the company on its merger with Sprint.

== Early life and education ==
Mignon Letitia Clyburn was born to Jim Clyburn and Emily Clyburn in Charleston, South Carolina on March 22, 1962. Her younger sister, Jennifer Clyburn Reed, is a businesswoman who co-chairs the Southeast Crescent Regional Commission. In 1980, Clyburn graduated from W. J. Keenan High School in Columbia, South Carolina. Clyburn received her bachelor of science (B.S.) degree in banking, finance, and economics from the University of South Carolina in 1984.

== Early career ==
From 1984 to 1998, Clyburn served as publisher, editor, and general manager of the Charleston, South Carolina-based The Coastal Times, a weekly African-American newspaper.

From 1998 to 2009, Clyburn was a member of the South Carolina Public Service Commission (PSC), representing South Carolina's 6th congressional district. She was first elected to the post on July 1, 1998, and served as the chair of the Commission from July 2002 to July 2004.

== Federal Communications Commission (FCC) ==
=== Nomination ===
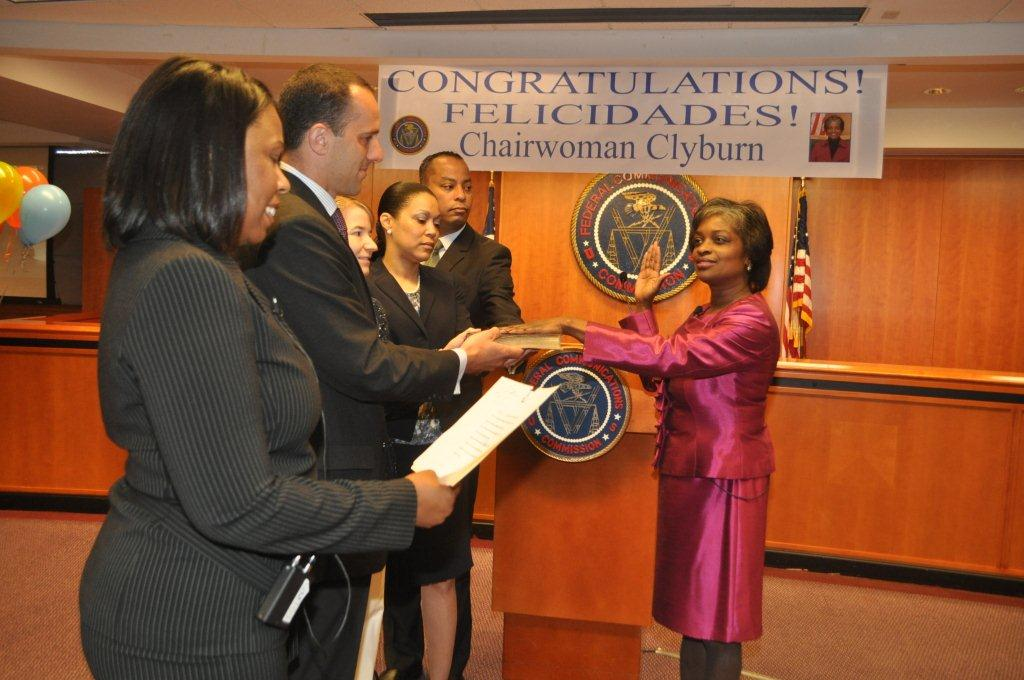
Clyburn being sworn in as acting FCC chairwoman in 2013

In April 2009, President Barack Obama nominated Clyburn to a vacant Democratic seat on the Federal Communications Commission. Clyburn initially was appointed to serve the unexpired term of Jonathan Adelstein, who left the Commission to take up a post in the U.S. Department of Agriculture.

In July 2009, Clyburn was confirmed to a full five-year term; her appointment was unanimously confirmed by the Senate. Clyburn began a second five-year term on the FCC in January 2013, having been nominated by Obama and confirmed by the Senate. In May 2013, Obama designated Clyburn as acting chairwoman of the FCC, a position she held until Tom Wheeler was appointed chairman in October 2013. Clyburn's five-year term ended on June 30, 2017, but pursuant to federal law, Clyburn remained on the Commission until June 6, 2018.

=== Tenure ===
On the FCC, Clyburn has led efforts to limit the costs of inmate telephone calls in the United States, which can reach exorbitant rates amounting to up to $54 a call. After Clyburn's tenure, Congress enacted the Martha Wright-Reed Just and Reasonable Communications Act, signed into law on January 5, 2023, which gave the FCC explicit authority to regulate rates for inmate communications services. In July 2024, the Commission adopted new nationwide caps on rates for incarcerated persons' communications, including a limit of $0.90 for a 15-minute call from large jails, and $1.35 from smaller facilities, as well as new limits on video calling rates.

==== Net neutrality ====
In 2015, Clyburn, alongside fellow Democratic commissioners Wheeler and Jessica Rosenworcel, voted to adopt the FCC Open Internet Order, a regulation protecting net neutrality in the United States. In 2017, after Donald Trump became president, Republicans took control of the FCC for the first time in Clyburn's tenure on the commission, and she was for a time the Commission's sole Democratic member. The new Republican-majority Commission under Chairman Ajit Pai sought to reverse FCC initiatives that had occurred under Obama, Clyburn mounted "a vigorous defense of the FCC's pro-consumer policies." After Pai revoked several Obama-era consumer-protection regulations and closed the FCC's inquiry into the telecommunications industry's controversial practice of zero-rating, Clyburn described the moves as an unlawful violation of the "basic principle of administrative procedure that actions must be accompanied by reasons for that action."

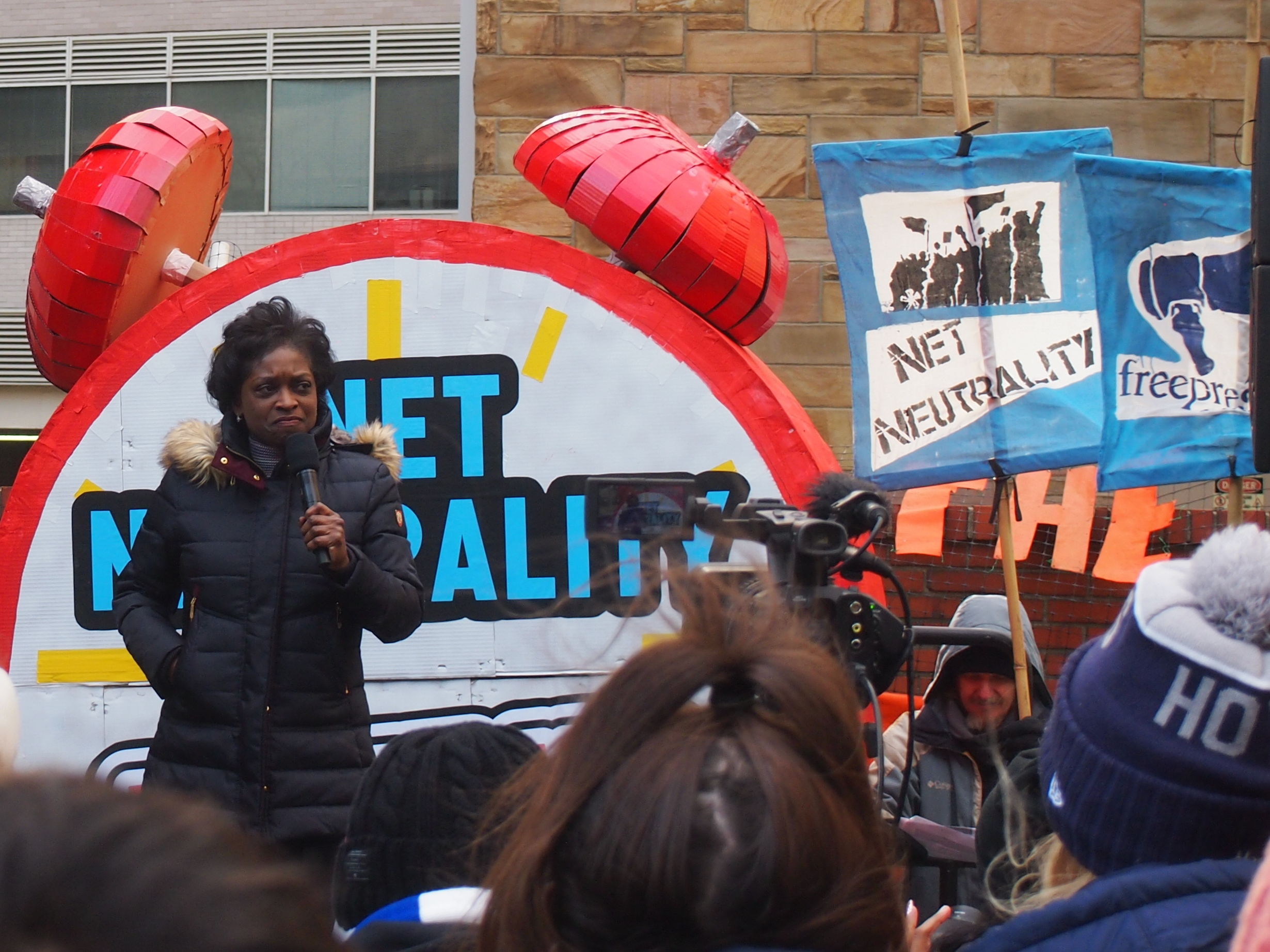
Clyburn at a net neutrality demonstration in Washington, D.C.

Clyburn has been a vocal advocate of preserving net neutrality in the United States. In May 2017, Clyburn dissented from the Commission's issuance of a notice of proposed rulemaking to repeal net neutrality and strongly criticized the proposal. In December 2017, Clyburn (along with fellow Democratic commissioner Jessica Rosenworcel) dissented from the FCC's reversal of the 2015 Open Internet Order. The repeal measure, championed by Pai, passed in a 3-2 party line vote. Congressman Jerry McNerney had requested to deliver remarks during the hearing, but was denied. Clyburn submitted her statement as part of the record.

==== Lifeline Program for Low-Income Consumers ====
Clyburn has also clashed with Pai over the Lifeline Program for Low-Income Consumers, a federal program that has subsidized phone access for low-income Americans since the 1980s. In 2016, Clyburn led an effort to include broadband access in the program for the first time, in order to close the digital divide. Pai countered this effort the following year, by terminating the participation of nine telecommunications companies in the program, a move that Clyburn strongly criticized.

== Post-FCC career ==
In 2018, Clyburn was appointed to the National Security Commission on Artificial Intelligence (NSCAI), which issued its final report in March 2021.

She served as President of MLC Strategies, LLC, a consulting firm, since January 2019. That same year, she was retained as an advisor to T-Mobile in connection with its merger with Sprint. Following Joe Biden's victory in the 2020 presidential election, Clyburn was named a member of his transition team.

== Personal life and recognition ==
Clyburn is a past chair of the YWCA of Greater Charleston. In 2009 she was designated a Women's History Month Honoree by the National Women's History Project.
