= Rachel Goslins =

American administrator and film director

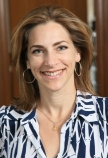

Executive Director of the President's Committee on the Arts and Humanities
- In office July 2009 – December 2015
- President: Barack Obama
- Preceded by: David H. Moran, III
- Succeeded by: Megan C. Beyer

Personal details
- Born: Rachel Eva Goslins; July 23, 1969 (age 57) Los Angeles County, California, U.S.
- Spouse: Julius Genachowski (div. 2020) Adam Krupa (m 2024)
- Children: 2
- Education: University of California, Santa Cruz (BA); University of California, Los Angeles (JD)
- Occupation: arts advocate, film director museum director

Rachel Eva Goslins (born July 23, 1969) is an American non-profit leader, museum director and documentary film director. As of August 2025, she is the executive director of the Milken Center for Advancing the American Dream, a cultural center in Washington, D.C. Prior to this, she was Director of the Smithsonian's Arts and Industries Building. She was previously head of the President's Committee on the Arts and the Humanities under President Obama, launching several initiatives in education and cultural diplomacy, and organizing a campaign for arts education.

Earlier in her career, Rachel founded a documentary production company, directing feature documentaries and television productions, and practiced law as an international copyright attorney.

== Career ==
Goslins is the founding executive director of the Milken Center for Advancing the American Dream in Washington, D.C. She joined the organization in 2022 and lead it through its public opening in September 2025. It is part of the Milken Institute.

Prior to this, she was the Director of the Arts & Industries Building at the Smithsonian Institution. In that capacity she led the revitalization and reopening of the museum, closed to the public for over a decade. She served in this position for 6 years, major initiatives include the Long conversation series, the By The People arts and cultural festival, and the FUTURES exhibition, a pan-institutional 35,000 sq ft. exhibit that welcomed almost a million in-person and digital visitors in 9 months and received global media coverage.

Before the Smithsonian, Goslins was the executive director of the President's Committee on the Arts and Humanities, an advisory committee to the White House on cultural policy. President Obama appointed her to this position in 2009. In this capacity, she worked closely with the White House, senior government officials, prominent artists, philanthropists and entrepreneurs and the country's cultural institutions to advance and support the arts and humanities in America and abroad. Under her management, the organization more than doubled its budget and programmatic activities, raised over $50M in public-private partnerships to support the arts, and launched several new initiatives, including Turnaround Arts, a partnership with the US Department of Education and the Ford Foundation to bring arts education to a group of the country's lowest-performing elementary schools, the National Student Poets Program, and a program with the Smithsonian Institution, UNESCO and the U.S. Department of State to rescue and preserve Haitian cultural artifacts in the wake of the 2009 hurricane. She stepped down as executive director in 2015.

=== Film ===
Her feature documentary, Bama Girl premiered at the 2008 South by Southwest (SXSW) Film Festival and later broadcast on the Independent Film Channel (IFC). It is the story of a "black woman at the University of Alabama who runs for 2005 Homecoming Queen, going up against a century of ingrained racial segregation, internal black politics, and The Machine, a secret coalition of traditionally white fraternities and sororities formed in 1914. She has worked on productions for the Public Broadcasting Service (PBS), the Discovery Channel, the National Geographic Channel (Nat Geo), and History, and was the director of the Independent Digital Distribution Lab, a joint PBS/ITVS project. Her most recent film was Besa: The Promise, an award-winning feature documentary about Albanian Muslims who saved Jews during World War II.

=== Law ===
Prior to her arts career, Rachel was an international copyright attorney in the office of Policy and International Affairs in the U.S. Copyright Office, where she had responsibility for negotiating and drafting sections of the Digital Millennium Copyright Act of 1998 and represented the Copyright Office at UNESCO, the World Intellectual Property Organization and the World Trade Organization. She began her career as a litigator for the law firm of Gibson Dunn & Crutcher. In 2012 she was awarded a Henry Crown Fellowship at the Aspen Institute.

== Personal life ==
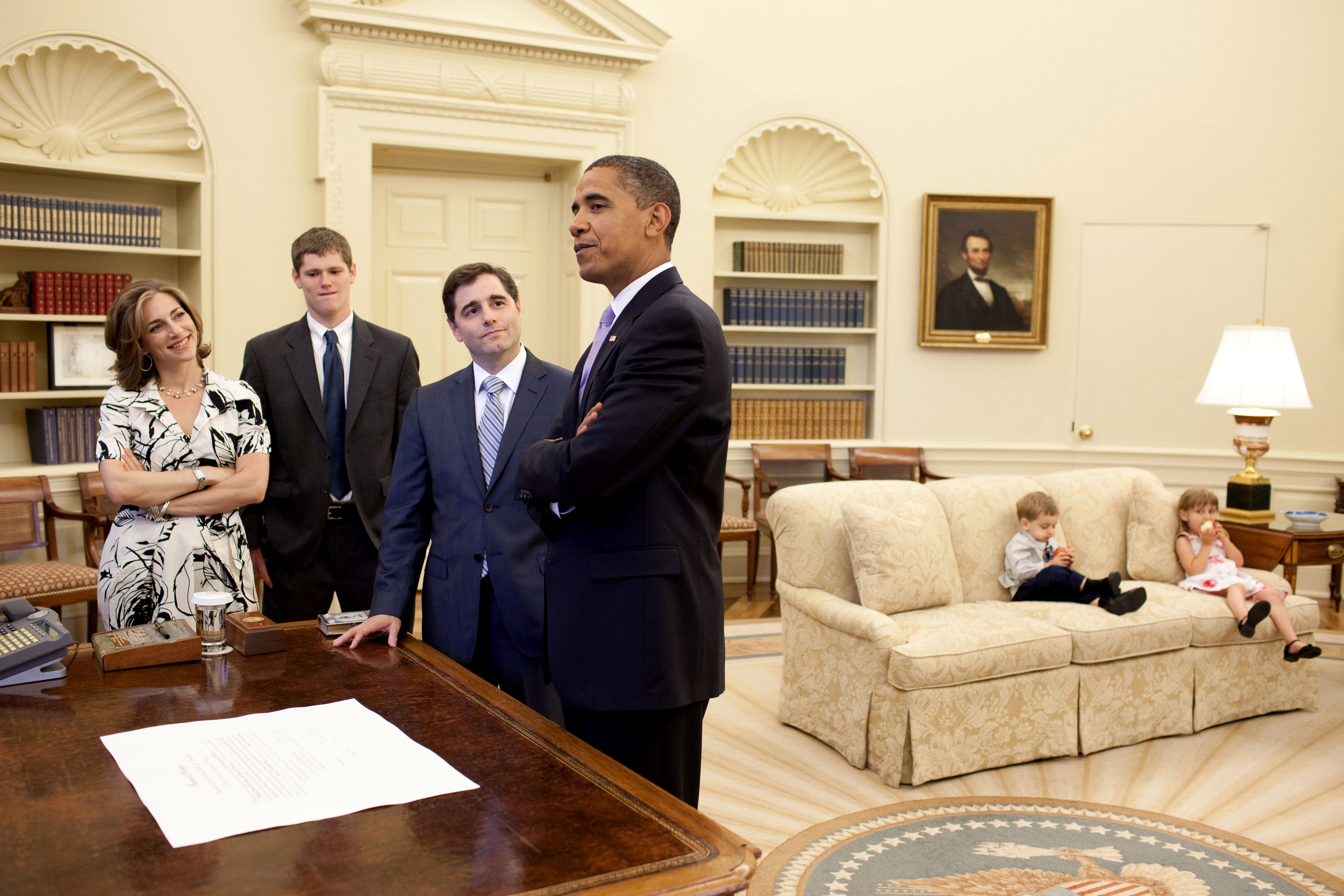
Goslins and her family with President Barack Obama in the Oval Office in 2009.

She was previously married to investor and former Federal Communications Commission Chairman Julius Genachowski, and they have two children together. She married again, to Adam Krupa, in 2024.
