= Homework gap =

Educational inequality from lack of internet access

The homework gap is the difficulty students experience completing homework when they lack internet access at home, compared to those who have access. According to a Pew Research Center analysis of the U.S. Census Bureau's American Community Survey data from 2013, there were approximately 5 million households with school-age children in the United States that lacked access to high-speed Internet service. Low-income households and minority households made up a “disproportionate” share of those 5 million households; 31.44% of households with school-age children whose incomes fell below $50,000 fell into the group without internet access at home. According to Pew, this group makes up about 40% of all families with school-age children in the United States.

== Causes ==
=== Affordability ===
One of the most commonly cited reasons for students’ lack of internet access at home is that it costs too much for their families to afford. In one study of K-12 students who did not have home internet access, 38% of all the families who were surveyed reported that it was too expensive for them. Although the homework gap is commonly thought of as a problem that mostly affects rural students, its greatest impact falls on students who live in urban areas, who have internet plans available to them but whose families cannot afford the price. Out of 64 million Americans with no internet access, only 16 million live in areas where there is no infrastructure. Some students who report having internet access at home are only able to use the internet through smartphones and mobile hotspots, in which case their usage depends on having enough data on their family's monthly data plan. Studies suggest that students whose families rely on mobile phones for internet usage often run out of data quickly or periodically lose access to phone service due to bills not being paid, making it an unreliable internet source for students needing to complete school work. The homework gap is closely linked to broader issues of the digital divide, where students from low-income households lack reliable internet access needed to complete school assignments. According to the National Education Association, this gap has become a major barrier to educational equity because many schools now assign homework that requires internet use.

=== Lack of infrastructure ===
Some students in rural areas of the United States are unable to access the internet at home because the infrastructure for internet access does not exist where they live. A study conducted by the Institute of Education Sciences in 2015 found that 18% of students living in remote rural areas had either no internet access or they only had dial-up internet access. Even if students in rural areas are able to access the internet at home, it is likely that their internet speed is inadequate. According to a 2020 FCC report, 22% of Americans living in rural areas could not reach 25 Mbps download speed, which is the benchmark broadband speed set by the FCC.

=== Socioeconomic ===
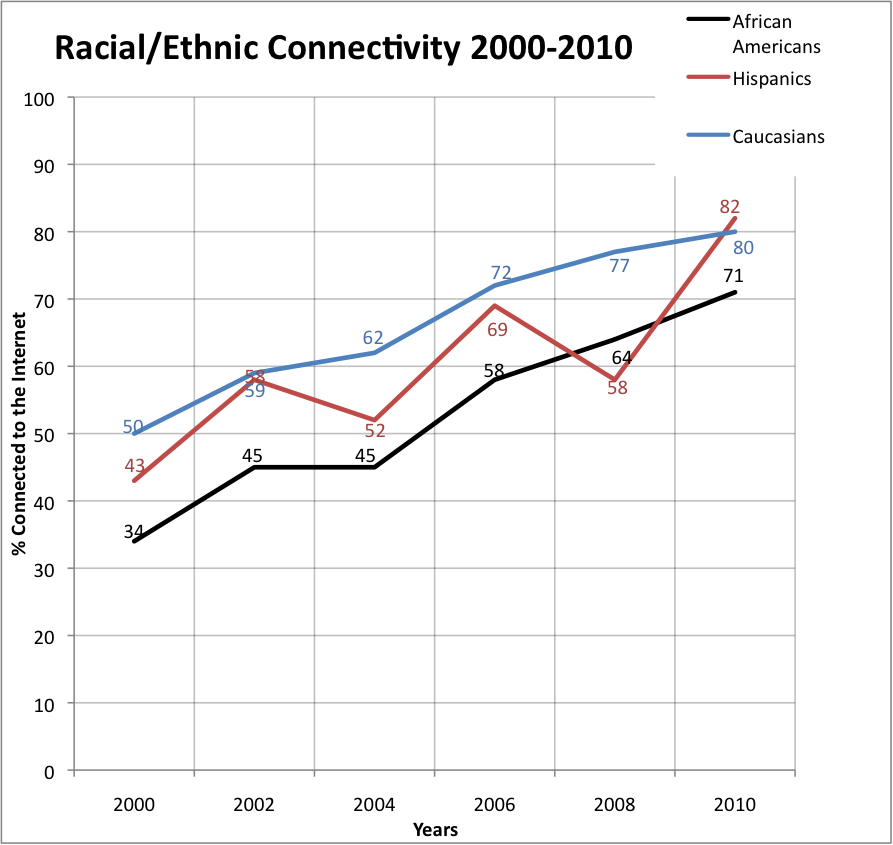
A graph showing internet connectivity over time by race

Studies have shown that a student's likeliness of having no internet access at home is increased by several socioeconomic factors. An important factor is the level of education of students’ parents: 71% of children whose parents had a bachelor's degree had internet access in their homes in 2015. Comparatively, only 42% of children whose parents had not completed high school had internet access. For students whose families earned a higher income, they were more likely to have internet access at home compared with students whose families earned a lower income or were below the poverty line. Students who are racial or ethnic minorities tend to have a lower percentage of internet usage at home than students who are white.

== Impact ==
E-learning should be an interactive process with multiple learning modes for all learners at various levels of learning. The distance learning environment is an exciting place to learn new things, collaborate with others, and retain self-discipline.Students who lack internet access at home risk falling behind on schoolwork, as well as being unable to learn technology skills that are needed for many jobs. Being unable to learn internet skills at a young age could put students at a disadvantage in the future. 94% of low income school districts utilize homework that is online, which makes internet access a necessity for students. In order to complete homework, students may resort to such measures as waiting for hours to use a public library computer or standing outside of their school after hours to try and pick up a WiFi signal. Research on the correlation between internet access and school performance has been limited. However, one study has shown a significant difference between states that have higher broadband access and states that do not, with the latter having students that tend to achieve lower scores in academic subjects. Another study found that in 2015, almost 50% of students surveyed said that they had missed assignments due to lack of internet access. With the homework gap impacting low-income populations, it is possible that the achievement gap between different socioeconomic groups of students will grow.

== Initiatives ==
=== U.S. policy changes ===
Policymakers in the United States have highlighted the homework gap as an issue of national importance. President Barack Obama cited the homework gap in launching the ConnectHome initiative in July 2015. Senator Angus King (I-ME) and Senator Shelley Moore Capito (R-WV) introduced legislation on the topic. FCC Commissioner Jessica Rosenworcel, who is credited with coining the term the “homework gap,” has encouraged changes to U.S. broadband internet and wi-fi policies to address this problem.

Persistent differences in home internet access continued to shape discussion of the homework gap in the mid-2020s. In July 2024, the Federal Communications Commission (FCC) adopted rules allowing schools and libraries to use E-Rate support for off-premises Wi-Fi hotspots and related services. On September 30, 2025, however, the FCC rescinded those rules on reconsideration and concluded that E-Rate support could not be used for off-premises hotspot service. The 2024 expansion and 2025 reversal reflected continued debate over how federal policy should address off-campus internet access for students. The policy reversal also renewed debate about whether access should be treated as an essential educational resource for students learning outside traditional classrooms.

The homework gap has been referred to some as a civil rights issue, as students are being denied information. In 2012, the United States government created a division called the Open Technology Fund. This program was created by the government to help support internet freedom technologies that ensure access, circumvent censorship, surveillance, and to promote human rights in the United States and on a global scale. This program is solely funded by grants and donations by interested parties. The goal is to have the access to the internet not be restricted by outside parties, attempting to ensure there are no conflicts of interest in regards to content being delivered to consumers. Currently, the program is working on completing and funding approximately 83 projects in upwards of 20 different countries, with most of the projects focusing on the United States.

=== Mobile hotspot programs ===
Mobile hotspot lending programs have been an effective strategy for increasing access to the internet. These programs, while opening access to the internet to those that can not afford it, are limited to only being helpful to students with access to smart devices, or some form of laptop computer. There are a number of different mobile hotspot lending programs attempting to increase the availability to the internet for students. For example, there is the Kajeet SmartSpot. With this device, students get filtered Internet access anytime, in any location. Additionally, educators receive reports into student use of digital resources that can inform future academic strategies.

=== Wi-Fi on school buses ===
One attempt to connect students to the internet is the implementation of Wi-Fi on certain school buses. In North Carolina and Missouri, Wi-Fi was added to school buses so students could finish their homework while they commuted to school. An example of this program is offered via Kajeet Smartbus. The benefit of this program has been linked to not only students completing their homework assignments more often, but also to better overall behavior on the daily bus commutes, offering relief for teachers, school employees, parents, students, and bus drivers. While North Carolina and Missouri were test states, the program is expecting to expand to other U.S. states that struggle with the homework gap. However, as with the mobile hotspot programs, these programs are only efficient if the students have access to hardware like a computer, tablet, or in some cases smartphones, that allow them to access the internet.

The COVID-19 pandemic increased attention on the homework gap because many students depended on internet access and digital devices for online learning. Research from the Pew Research Center found that low-income students and students who lived in rural areas, were more likely to experience difficulties completing schoolwork because of limited internet access.
