= Inmate video visitation =

Video visitation is the use of videoconferencing and/or analog CCTV systems and software to allow inmates and visitors to visit at a distance as opposed to face-to-face. It allows people with a computer, internet, webcam, and credit card to communicate with inmates at select jails. According to the Prison Policy Initiative, 74% of jails dropped face-to-face visitation after installing video visitation. As of May 2016, over 600 prisons in 46 states across the U.S. use some sort of video visitation system.

== Overview ==
Video visitation is a term used for technology that allows the inmate and visitor to communicate via analog or digital videoconferencing equipment. Under the old method of face-to-face visitation, inmates were transferred from their housing area to the visitation area, while visitors often had to walk through the facility. With video visitation, inmates will use a video visitation station located in their cell or cell block, while visitors can use a corresponding station elsewhere—or use their computers from home or office. This reduces the amount of manpower needed to conduct visits by reducing the movement of inmates; reducing inmate movement also reduces contraband at the facility.

Digital Video Visitation has begun to replace the analog technology, due to less expensive and more readily integratable components.

Some prisons have ended all in-person visitations, leaving video visitations as the only option for communication with inmates such as the Travis County Correctional Complex in Del Valle, Texas.

== Purpose ==
Video visitation by design eliminates the public from having direct contact with inmates. Usually video visitations stations are placed in visitor areas for the visitors, while inmates have stations located in day rooms or within the cell block areas. By placing the stations in such a manner, inmate and visitor movement through a secure correctional facility is reduced or even eliminated. Visitation through the internet completely eliminates visitors onsite. All of these systems also free up correctional officers' time for traditional security duties, reduce the number of correctional officers required for the visitation process, eliminate infrastructure dedicated to the traditional visitation process, reduce contraband infiltration and reduce the possibility of inmate confrontation.

== History ==
The Inmate Video Visitation System concept was first developed and installed by Datapoint Corporation for the Brevard County Jail Complex in Brevard County, Florida. The world's first inmate video visitation system was installed in late 1995 followed shortly thereafter with a similar installation at the St. Lucie County Jail in Ft. Pierce, Florida in early 1996. Both of these systems are still in operation, however St. Lucie has upgraded to a more recent version. Brevard County is still using the original hardware from 1995. Over the years, as technology has advanced and the acceptance for video visitation has gained ground, systems begun to include management and scheduling software used to manage the video visitation environment.

In recent years, with the development of higher performance and lower cost digital videoconferencing equipment and the availability of high bandwidth digital communications with QoS support, the inmate video visitation concept has expanded to support remote visitation capabilities. The use of digital videoconferencing equipment has allowed facilities to use technology already in use by businesses to better manage, support, and expand video visitation to auxiliary applications such as telemedicine, video arraignment, video plea and distance learning.

== Funding ==
The cost for a video visitation system, whether that is with old technology or internet based systems which include hardware, management/scheduling software, recording and servers/switches is around $5000/station. Video visitation technology is funded in several different ways. For new facilities, the funding usually comes from traditional means, while with older facilities there are a number of options correctional facilities use. One of the most common is to use inmate welfare funds to purchase the equipment and software for video visitation. The inmate welfare funds are added to usually by profits received from inmate phone calls and commissary items. Another method is through the inmate phone contracts themselves. Often facilities are able to negotiate commissions on the phone contracts. Correctional facilities can forgo a negotiable percentage of commission in order to have the inmate phone service provider purchase the equipment and software for video visitation.
