= Securus Technologies =

Prison communications company

Securus Technologies, Inc.
- Company type: Private
- Industry: Technology, Rehabilitative Electronics, Telecommunications for Correctional Facilities
- Founded: 1986; 40 years ago (as TZ Holdings Inc.); Dallas, Texas, U.S.
- Founder: Richard Smith
- Headquarters: Carrollton, Texas, U.S.
- Products: Tablets, Money Transfers, Communications, education, and reentry services for incarcerated individuals.
- Number of employees: 1,600+ (estimated)
- Parent: Aventiv Technologies
- Website: www.Aventiv.com securustech.net

Securus Technologies is a technology communications firm serving prisons across the United States. The company has faced criticism over phone call pricing, data security, monopoly and product innovation.

== History ==
Securus was founded as TZ Holdings Inc. in 1986 in Dallas, Texas. In April 2009, the company changed its name from TZ Holdings Inc. to Securus Technologies. During the 2010s, Securus was one of a number of companies which provided telephone service to inmates in US prisons. In 2013, Securus was partially acquired by ABRY Partners from Castle Harlan for $640 million. In July 2015, the company was the target of a data breach of about 70 million records of phone calls. Also in 2015, Securus Technologies acquired JPay, a technology company that provided electronic payment, communication, and media services in more than 33 state prison systems. By 2016, Securus acquired 20 government services, software-based businesses, technologies, patents and exclusive partner agreements.

In 2017, the company was acquired by Beverly Hills-based private equity firm Platinum Equity, owned by billionaire Tom Gores. In 2019, Platinum Equity announced plans to reorganize the company as a more diverse technology company, and created Aventiv Technologies as Securus' new corporate parent.

In mid-January 2020, Aventiv Technologies named Dave Abel as its president and CEO. Abel committed to reform corporate policies and practices, acknowledging the company "faced criticism in the past over pricing, data security, product innovation and other issues."

In April 2025, Aventiv Technologies announced an agreement between Platinum Equity and financial stakeholders to invest $360 million in exchange for equity in the company.

== Operations ==
Securus is headquartered in Dallas, Texas with regional offices located in Carrollton, Texas, Miramar, Missouri, and Houston, Texas. As of 2015, the company employed approximately 1,600 people and was reported to have contracts with 2,600 correctional facilities in the United States.

By the end of 2021, Aventiv Technologies deployed over 400,000 tablet devices to incarcerated individuals including 100,000 tablets that Securus Technologies made available to incarcerated individuals in Texas for free, with additional content expected to cover the costs.

== Communication costs ==
Prices for calls vary greatly among institutions, with first-minute charges from over US$5 to 4 cents, and from over US$1 to 4 cents for subsequent minutes. Prices of out-of-state calls were capped by the FCC to around 21 cents per minute; however, instate rates at many jails and prisons continue to be much higher. On December 8, 2021, Aventiv Technologies announced that the average per minute cost of calls made by incarcerated individuals with Aventiv technology was reduced from $0.15 per minute to a record-low $0.13 per minute.

In 2017, the company announced its Wireless Containment Solution, which was developed to prevent contraband cell phones from connecting to mobile networks. As of November 2017, the company reported that the Wireless Containment Solution system has blocked 1.7 million inmate calls from prisons.

In 2021, the California Public Utilities Commission capped the calling rates at detention facilities in the state at $0.07 per minute.

== Criticism and controversy ==
In 2015, Securus aggressively lobbied to strike down Federal Communications Commission intervention regarding pricing regulation for inmate communications.

On May 10, 2018, The New York Times revealed that one of Securus' products can be used to track the location of almost any phone in the US within seconds. Senator Ron Wyden (D-Oregon) has sent letters to the Federal Communications Commission (FCC) and telecommunications companies demanding answers on the controversial surveillance system. In June, 2022, a US Marshal was indicted by the Department of Justice for abusing the product to track people he knew, uploading blank documents and pretending he had authority to track people he had personal relationships with and their spouses. Securus responded to the indictment that they had "discontinued the tool more than four years ago and permanently shut it off.

The prison phone industry has been criticized for charging high fees and profiting off of vulnerable inmates. In 2019, New York City passed a bill ensuring 21 minutes of free phone calls for all inmates in New York City jails; before the bill, the phone contract with Securus had generated $5 million in revenue for the city and $2.5 million for Securus.

In 2015, Securus fees were the following:

- Around 10% for bank transfer
- Between $0.35 and $0.50 for "virtual stamps" per page of email.
- Around $20 per hour for video chat

In 2019, Securus was found to covertly record and fingerprint inmates' and their correspondents voices by monitoring phone calls, to automatically flag the "suspicious" ones. Securus did not respond to a request for comment on how it defined “suspicious.” In some states, enrollment in the voice recognition program is mandatory to be able to make calls. Voice prints produced by the program are permanently archived at Securus’s facility in Texas.

In 2024, Securus faced a class action lawsuit with the plaintiffs claiming that the company engaged in a "quid pro quo kickback scheme" with county jails in Michigan which banned in-person visits in order to maximize revenue from voice and video calls. In August 2024, the lawsuit was dismissed by Circuit Judge Michael West stating, "no constitutional rights are implicated in this case, fundamental or otherwise."

== See also ==
- Managed access (corrections)
- Inmate telephone system
