= Deborah Tate =

American government official

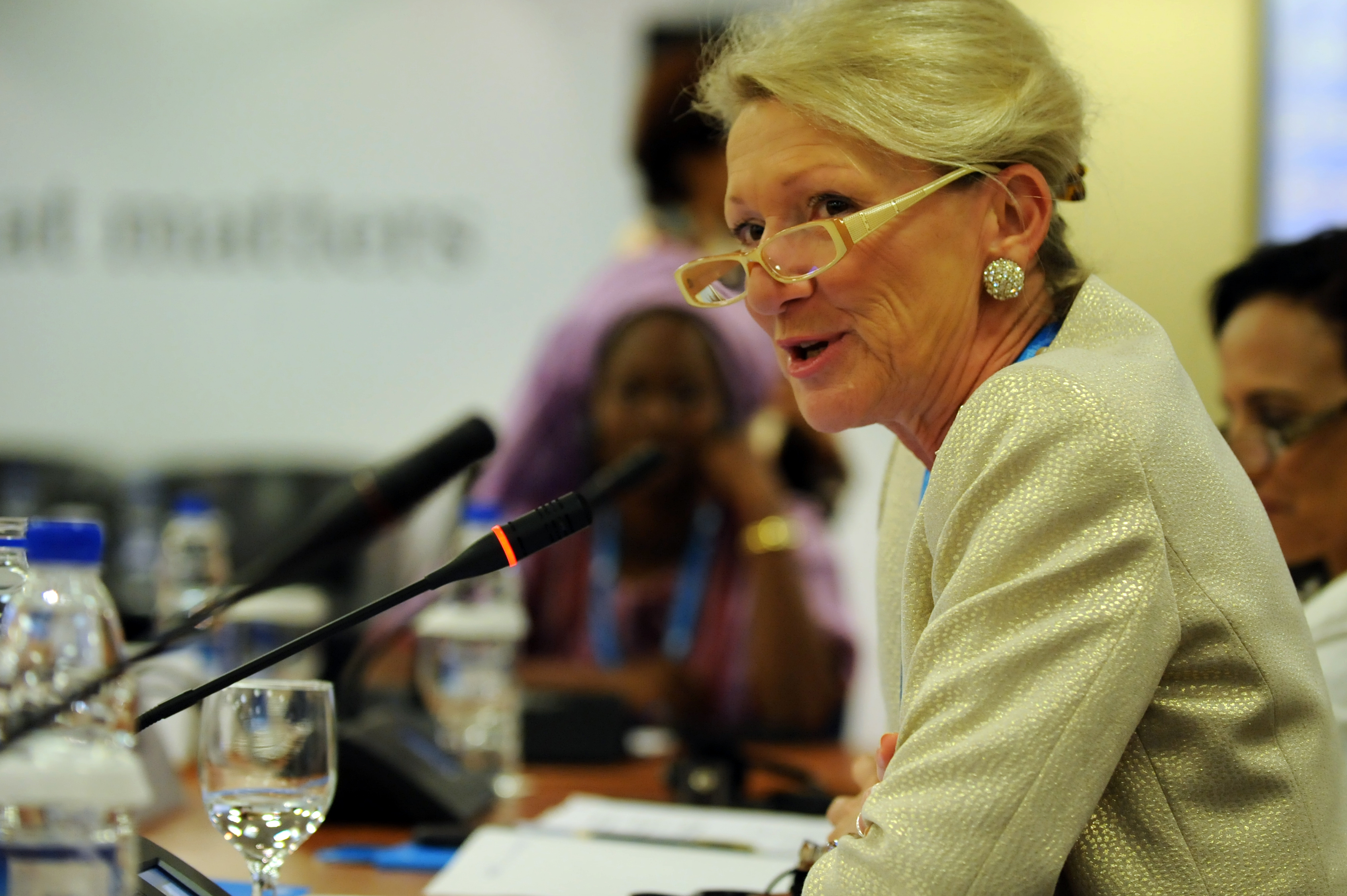

Member of the Federal Communications Commission
- In office January 3, 2006 - January 3, 2009
- President: George W. Bush

Deborah Taylor Tate was a Commissioner of the Federal Communications Commission (FCC). She was nominated by President George W. Bush on November 9, 2005, for the remainder of the term expiring June 30, 2007. She was unanimously confirmed by the United States Senate on December 21, 2005, and sworn in as FCC Commissioner on January 3, 2006. She has spoken out in favor of digital rights management and suggested TV may be a contributing factor in childhood obesity.

Tate was a recipient of the 2006 Mary Harriman Community Leadership Award. She has been a member of the Junior League of Nashville for more than 17 years, and she served a chairperson for countless committees within her League and has held leadership positions on numerous boards in Nashville.

In April 2007, the Center for Public Integrity reported that Tate, a Nashville, Tennessee native, received talking points on how to best oppose the pending merger between satellite radio firms XM and Sirius from a representative of Clear Channel, a terrestrial radio company opposing the deal.

On December 30, 2008, the FCC announced that Tate would be resigning from office. In June 2009, President Obama nominated Mignon Clyburn to take her place.
