= Michael Copps =

U.S. Federal Communications Commission

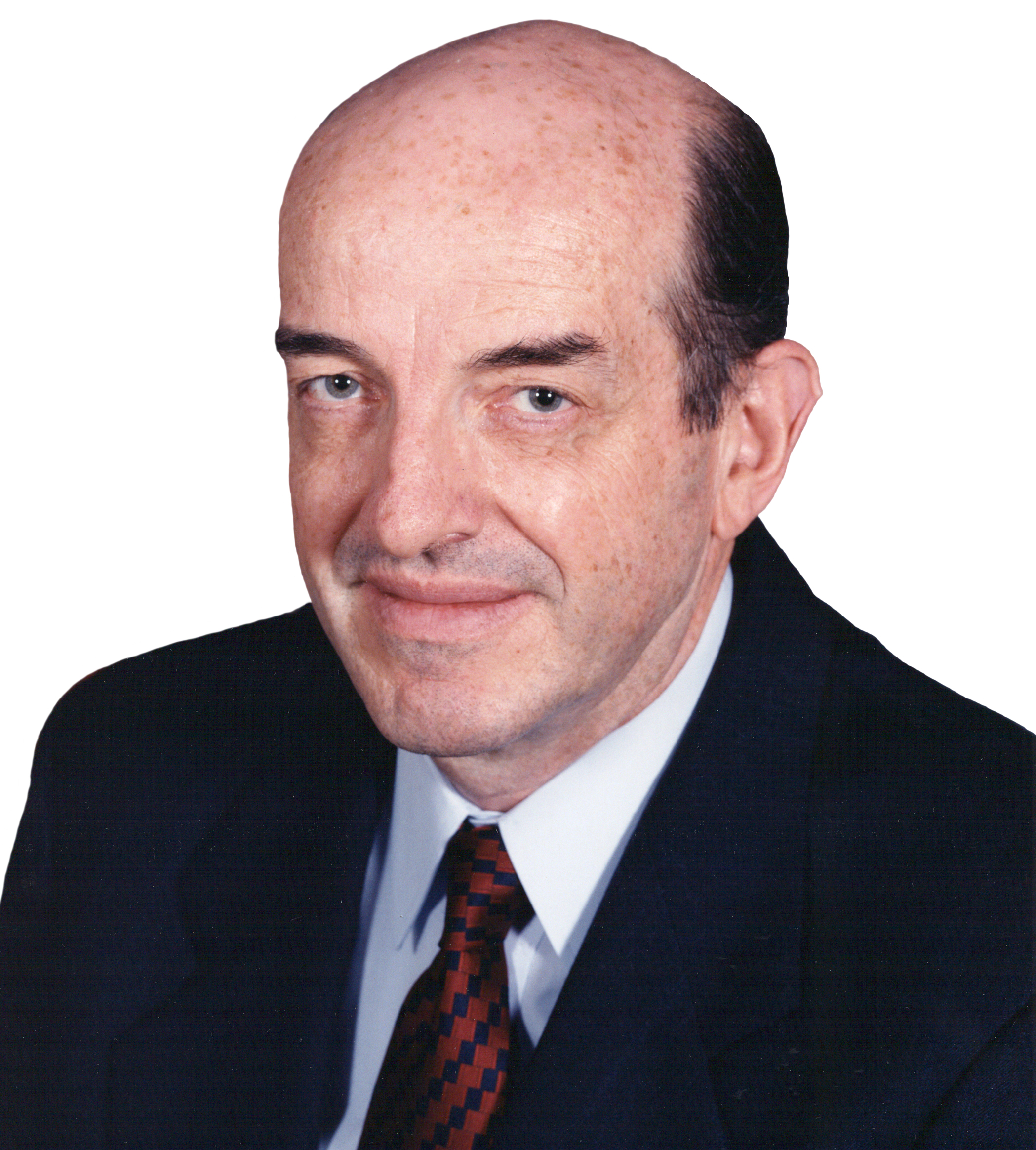

Chairman of the Federal Communications Commission Acting
- In office January 22, 2009 – June 28, 2009
- President: Barack Obama
- Preceded by: Kevin Martin
- Succeeded by: Julius Genachowski

Personal details
- Born: Michael Joseph Copps; April 23, 1940 (age 86) Milwaukee, Wisconsin
- Party: Democratic
- Education: B.A. Wofford College; Ph.D. University of North Carolina at Chapel Hill

Michael Joseph Copps (born April 23, 1940) is a former commissioner of the U.S. Federal Communications Commission (FCC), an independent agency of the United States government. He was sworn in on May 31, 2001, and served until December 31, 2011. He took on the additional role of acting chairman from January 22, 2009, through June 28, 2009. He relinquished the chairmanship to Julius Genachowski after Genachowski was confirmed by the U.S. Senate on June 25 and then sworn in on June 29, 2009. In 2014, he joined Common Cause, a nonpartisan citizen advocacy organization, to lead a Media and Democracy Initiative.

== Biography ==
=== Early life, education ===
Copps was born in Milwaukee, Wisconsin. He was a professor of history at Loyola University New Orleans, from 1967 to 1970. He obtained his B.A. from Wofford College in 1963, where he was elected to Pi Gamma Mu and to Phi Beta Kappa. He completed his Ph.D. in history from the University of North Carolina at Chapel Hill in 1968. He served as chief of staff to Senator Ernest Hollings for almost 12 years before his appointment to the United States Commerce Department as assistant secretary.

=== FCC Commissioner ===
He served as one of the commissioners of the FCC from May 31, 2001 to December 31, 2011. He was acting chairman between January 22, 2009, and June 28, 2009. He relinquished the chairmanship to Julius Genachowski after Genachowski was confirmed by the U.S. Senate on June 25 and then sworn in on June 29, 2009.

=== Comcast's acquisition of NBC Universal ===
On January 18, 2011 the FCC and the United States Department of Justice allowed Comcast to buy NBC Universal. Michael Copps was the only commissioner of the FCC to vote against the merger.

He said:

I searched in vain for the benefits (...) Pardon me, but a deal of this size should be expected to yield more than the limited benefits cited. (...) In sum, this is simply too much, too big, too powerful, too lacking in benefits for American consumers and citizens.... I would be true to neither the statute nor to everything I have fought for here at the Commission over the past decade if I did not dissent from what I consider to be a damaging and potentially dangerous deal (..) At the end of the day, the public interest requires more-much more-than it is receiving. The Comcast-NBCU joint venture opens the door to the cable-ization of the open Internet. The potential for walled gardens, toll booths, content prioritization, access fees to reach end users, and a stake in the heart of independent content production is now very real.
