= Managed access (corrections) =

Managed access is managing cellular network access from contraband phones within a corrections facility. Managed access differs from cellular jamming technologies, which are outlawed in the United States. A managed access system functions like a femtocell or low-power cell tower which passes calls to cellular carriers; however, only communications from approved devices and emergency calling are allowed. The managed access signal appears as an extension of nearby commercial cellular signals; once a phone connects to the network its identifying information is compared with approved devices and communications are accepted or denied. Managed access networks work with commercial cellular signals including 2G, 3G, 4G/LTE, and WiMAX.

In 2010, the Mississippi Department of Corrections tested the first managed access system at Parchman Mississippi State Penitentiary; during one month the system blocked more than 216,000 texts and 600 phone calls. In 2013, the FCC recommended that prisons be allowed to manage their own network access without having to seek approval from the agency, saying that the process of inspecting the systems is "time-consuming and complex" and "discourages their use". In a 2016 op-ed, FCC Chairman Ajit Pai requested that the reforms proposed in 2013 aimed at loosening regulations on managed access and other solutions used to prevent the use of contraband cell phones should be enacted.

As of 2016, only California, Maryland, Mississippi, South Carolina, and Texas had tested managed access systems.

== Drawbacks ==
Managed access systems are unable to stop the use of contraband devices using Wi-Fi to connect to the internet. Deployment of managed access systems requires FCC approval and may require consent from cellular network carriers. The devices can also cause interference outside of the prison if they are not properly implemented.
