= Julius Genachowski =

American lawyer and businessman (born 1962)

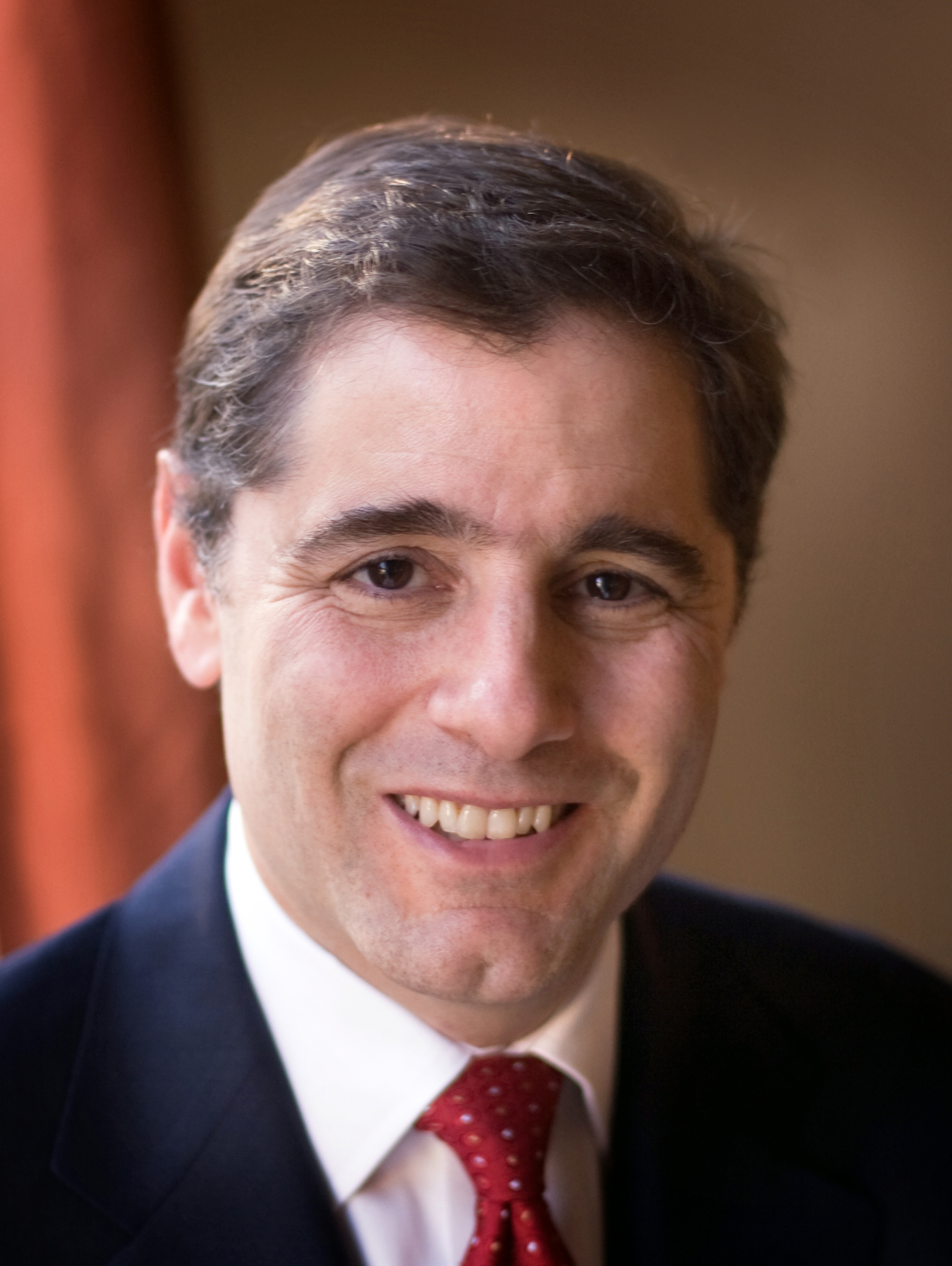

Chairman of the Federal Communications Commission
- In office June 29, 2009 – November 4, 2013
- President: Barack Obama
- Preceded by: Michael Copps (Acting)
- Succeeded by: Tom Wheeler

Personal details
- Born: August 19, 1962 (age 64) Brookline, Massachusetts, U.S.
- Party: Democratic
- Spouse(s): Martha Raddatz (m. 1991; div. 1997) Rachel Goslins (div. 2020)
- Children: 3
- Education: Columbia University (BA); Harvard University (JD)

Julius Genachowski (born August 19, 1962) is an American lawyer and businessman. He became the Federal Communications Commission chairman on June 29, 2009. On March 22, 2013, he announced he would be leaving the FCC in the coming weeks. On January 6, 2014, it was announced that Genachowski had joined The Carlyle Group. He transitioned from Partner and Managing Director to Senior Advisor in early 2024.

== Early life and education ==
Genachowski was born in Brookline, Massachusetts, and grew up in Great Neck, New York, the son of Adele and Azriel Genachowski. Genachowski attended Yeshiva University High School for Boys. He attended yeshiva and studied in Israel. He entered Columbia College of Columbia University as a pre-med student, but earned a Bachelor of Arts in History in 1985, magna cum laude. He was an Editor of the Columbia Daily Spectator. After working in Washington, D.C., for former New York Congressman Chuck Schumer, he entered Harvard Law School and earned a Juris Doctor (1991), also magna cum laude. He was a Notes Editor at the Harvard Law Review when his classmate Barack Obama was its president. Genachowski clerked for The Honorable Abner J. Mikva on the U.S. Court of Appeals for the D.C. Circuit and then for Justices William J. Brennan and David Souter at the U.S. Supreme Court.

== Government and business experience ==
Genachowski was on the staffs of the Select Committee investigating the Iran-Contra Affair and then U.S. Representative Chuck Schumer. In 1994 FCC Chairman Reed Hundt hired him as a senior legal advisor; he was chief counsel 1996-1997.

He was Chief of Business Operations and a member of Barry Diller's Office of the Chairperson at IAC/InterActiveCorp and executive responsible for the creation of Fox Broadcasting Company and USA Broadcasting. He earned at least $2.5 million when Vivendi acquired Universal assets in 2003. He had previously served on the Boards of Directors of Expedia, Hotels.com, and Ticketmaster.

Genachowski was a co-founder of LaunchBox Digital and Rock Creek Ventures; a Special Advisor at General Atlantic; and a member of the Boards of Directors at The Motley Fool, Web.com, Mark Ecko Enterprises, and Beliefnet. In April 2006, he was appointed to the Board of JackBe.

He served on the board of Common Sense Media, a leading organization seeking to improve the media lives of children and families and the Advisory Board of Environmental Entrepreneurs (E2). He also helped found the New Resource Bank, the country's first commercial green bank.

On January 6, 2014, it was announced that Genachowski returned to the corporate world to take a post at The Carlyle Group. There he will reportedly concentrate on global technology, media, and telecommunications investments.

In May 2023, Sonos appointed Genachowski chair of its board; he had served as a director since September 2013. He joined Mattel's board effective 5 February 2024.

== Obama campaign and transition ==
For Senator Barack Obama's 2008 Presidential Campaign, Genachowski was Chairperson of the Technology, Media and Telecommunications Policy Working Group, which created the Obama Technology and Innovation Plan. He also advised and guided the Campaign's innovative use of technology and the Internet for grassroots engagement and participation.

After the November election, he co-led the Technology, Innovation, and Government Reform Group for President-Elect Obama's Transition Team. On January 12, 2009, several news outlets reported that Genachowski would be President-Elect Obama's choice to head the FCC. This was confirmed by a press release on March 3, 2009.

== Tenure as FCC Chairman ==
On June 25, 2009, the U.S. Senate almost unanimously confirmed Julius Genachowski as FCC Chairman, with the only vote in opposition coming from Senator Jim DeMint. Wired named "A New FCC" one of the "Top 7 Disruptions of the Year" after Genachowski announced plans to create the country's first national broadband plan, reallocate spectrum from over-the-air TV broadcasters to meet demand for wireless usage, and pursue rules to preserve Internet freedom and openness.

According to an opinion piece by Genachowski, wireless providers increased wireless infrastructure investment more than 60% between 2009 and 2013 and the United States led the world in the deployment and adoption of 4G/LTE mobile broadband. A study by the ITIF made similar assertions. However, numerous press outlets subsequently questioned the findings. Businessweek called the U.S. a "wireless backwater" prior to 2008, while Genachowski praised the mobile industry for "America's leadership in mobile" in 2009.

In terms of wired broadband, the Genachowski FCC reported that networks capable of 100 megabits per second passed less than 20% of U.S. homes in 2009 and over 80% in 2012, putting the U.S. near the top of the world in deployment of broadband infrastructure. This followed announcements of upgrade plans by cable operators in 2008. According to an opinion piece by Genachowski, American firms installed more fiber optic cable for high-speed broadband in 2011 and 2012 than those of any nation other than China, and more than all European nations combined.

Genachowski announced his resignation on March 22, 2013. He will join the Aspen Institute as a senior fellow. In addition, he announced in January 2014 that, upon leaving the FCC, he would begin work for the Carlyle Group.

=== National Broadband Plan ===
On March 16, 2010, Genachowski released a National Broadband Plan, titled "Connecting America: The National Broadband Plan". The plan lays out a vision for a U.S. strategic advantage in broadband. It includes more than 200 recommendations, including proposals to reallocate airwaves for mobile broadband and to modernize the FCC's $9 billion per year Universal Service Fund from a program that supports phone service to a program that efficiently supports broadband. Proponents had argued that lack of a national plan put the United States at a competitive disadvantage compared to nations with developed broadband plans.

The plan was released to generally positive reviews from public interest and business leaders. Some public interest advocates expressed concern that the plan did not propose to foster more competition in a broadband market. For example, the broadband plan found there to be "reasons to be concerned about wireline broadband competition in the United States."

President Obama commended the plan, and the Obama administration endorsed the spectrum goal in a speech by National Economic Council Director Lawrence Summers. At the end of Genachowski's tenure, 87 percent of the action agenda had been acted upon. Additional agenda items were never provided.

=== Connect America Fund ===
Under Genachowski, the FCC overhauled the $9 billion per year Universal Service Fund (USF) into a program that supports universal broadband service rather than phone service. The new Connect America Fund was approved unanimously by the FCC in October 2011 and launched in April 2012, and maintains the same annual budget as USF.

The FCC projects the Connect America Fund will help connect over 19 million Americans to broadband, mostly in rural areas. In July 2012, the FCC announced the first phase of the program which, over three years, pairs $115 million in public funds with private investment to bring high-speed Internet to 400,000 residents and businesses that lack access.

As part of the reforms, the FCC identified mobile broadband as a Universal Service goal for the first time. The Connect America Fund includes a Mobility Fund specifically to bring 3G and 4G wireless broadband to unserved areas.

=== Spectrum crunch ===
Genachowski has warned of a "spectrum crunch" of public airwaves, in which demand for mobile broadband service outstrips the availability of spectrum. Numerous experts have disputed claims that a "spectrum crunch" exists.

Genachowski and his team have pushed for incentive auctions of broadcast television spectrum—a proposal in the National Broadband Plan to allow spectrum license-holders to supply spectrum for auction and receive a share of the proceeds. The plan received criticism from some television broadcasters, who said it favored mobile broadband deployment goals over their industry. The auctions gained bipartisan support from U.S. lawmakers and praise from wireless and tech companies as a way to promote investment in wireless networks and drive further innovation.

Incentive auctions were passed by U.S. Congress and adopted into law as part of the deal to extend the payroll tax cut. Genachowski announced the process would be advised by a team of auction economics experts, led by economist Paul Milgrom.

Genachowski has pushed for spectrum sharing between current government and commercial wireless users in order to improve network capacity. He has also advocated for the preservation and use of unlicensed spectrum bands as platforms for innovation, citing the success of Wi‑Fi, which uses unlicensed spectrum. The FCC has set aside spectrum for unlicensed use.

In February 2013, the FCC voted unanimously on a Genachowski proposal to free up wireless spectrum that will increase Wi-Fi speeds and ease network congestion in homes and at major hubs, like conferences, airports, hotels etc. It is the largest block of unlicensed spectrum made available for Wi-Fi in over a decade, and adds an additional 195 MHz of spectrum in the 5 GHz band. NPR's Marketplace called the vote a "rare moment of unanimity in Washington."

=== Mergers and acquisitions ===
Under Genachowski, the FCC approved the Comcast NBC merger in January 2011. The FCC and Department of Justice applied a number of public interest conditions to promote online competition in the video marketplace. Unfortunately, according to the FCC, the price of multichannel video has continued to rise. In June 2012, Comcast agreed to pay an $800,000 settlement for allegedly violating their agreement with the FCC to market an affordable, standalone broadband deal that was not tied to cable television plans.

In November 2011, following an August 2011 announcement by the Department of Justice that the merger would be opposed, the FCC moved to block AT&T's proposed $39 billion bid for rival T-Mobile. The merger would have combined the second and fourth-largest cellphone carriers in the country, resulting in the largest concentration in U.S. wireless market in history.[47] AT&T withdrew their application days later. AT&T competitors have sought to improve their market position with a proposed merger between T-Mobile/MetroPCS and a major investment in Sprint Nextel by Japan's Softbank.

=== Consumer empowerment and protection ===
==== Connect2Compete ====
Genachowski announced the launch of Connect2Compete in 2011, an initiative to help close the digital divide by expanding broadband and computer access to low-income households. Connect2Compete offers under $10 per month broadband access and under $150 laptops to households with a child enrolled in the national school lunch program. It is a partnership with Internet service providers, technology companies, and nonprofits, run outside government and funded by in-kind commitments. In May 2012, Connect2Compete launched a pilot program to expand access in San Diego. It reports billions of dollars in commitments and plans to launch in all 50 states.

==== Gigabit City Challenge ====
In January 2013, Genachowski launched a "Gigabit City Challenge" to engage with broadband providers and state and local leaders to ensure ultrafast gigabit Internet is available in at least one community in all fifty states by 2015. As part of the initiative, Genachowski announced plans to hold workshops and create best practices resources to help reach the goal.

==== Combating bill shock ====
In 2011 the FCC and wireless carriers reached an agreement to combat bill shock when consumers receive unexpected overage charges. Smartphone and tablet wireless data users now receive alerts when they near an overage charge.

==== Leading Education by Advancing Digital (LEAD) ====
Genachowski launched an effort with U.S. Secretary of Education Arne Duncan to encourage the spread of digital textbooks and create a blueprint on how to harness technology for education reform. In 2012 the FCC and Department of Education joined with technology and education leaders to form the Leading Education by Advancing Digital (LEAD) Commission to analyze trends and present policy and funding recommendations. LEAD is co-chaired by Columbia University President Lee Bollinger, TPG Capital co‑founder James Coulter, former Secretary of Education Margaret Spellings and Common Sense Media founder and CEO Jim Steyer.

==== Data roaming ====
Genachowski led a successful effort to pass data roaming rules so consumers have access to wireless Internet even in areas their provider does not cover. The rules passed on a 3‑2 vote in April 2011. The rules require Verizon and AT&T to enter into roaming agreements with smaller carriers in order to preserve industry competition.

==== Health Care ====
Genachowski launched a Healthcare Connect Fund in 2012 to expand access to broadband for health care. The fund is capped at $400 million and will help bring modern, cost-saving telehealth technology to rural hospitals and clinics. Genachowski also led an effort to provide spectrum for wireless medical technology—called Medical Area Body Networks (mBANs)—that monitor patients' vital signs to improve outcomes and lower costs.

==== Public files of TV stations ====
The FCC also passed a rule to require local television stations to put their public files online. The rule modernized the existing agency rule that requires public files available at television stations in physical filing cabinets. The rule was proposed in an FCC report "The Information Needs of Communities", commissioned by Genachowski and authored by Steve Waldman in 2011. Since 1938, broadcasters have been required to make a file available to the public containing information on station advertising and other topics. The new rule was passed in April 2012, and initially ABC, NBC, Fox, and CBS stations in the top 50 markets will have to put their file online—in 2014, all TV stations will be required to comply. Broadcasters resisted the requirement and claimed that administrative costs would be high. Public interest groups and editorial boards such as Bloomberg News endorsed the rule.

==== Twenty-First Century Communications and Video Accessibility Act (CVAA) ====
In January 2012, the FCC released a report and order on implementation of the Twenty-First Century Communications and Video Accessibility Act (CVAA), which updates federal law to increase the access of persons with disabilities to modern communications. Among the reforms was a rule moving Internet video previously shown on television to closed captioning.

=== Net neutrality ===
While chief technology advisor to President-Elect Obama, Genachowski was a strong advocate of a net neutrality principle. Net neutrality principles were first articulated at the FCC by Republican Chairmen Michael Powell and Kevin Martin, and were endorsed in a unanimous FCC policy statement in 2005. Support for codifying net neutrality came from public interest groups, venture capitalists, wireless carriers such as Sprint and Clearwire, and a coalition including Google, Amazon, Twitter and others. Support for the net neutrality principle was also a campaign promise of Barack Obama. Opposition largely came from dominant Internet service providers.

In May 2010, the FCC proposed an Open Internet Order with net neutrality rules that required wireline Internet service providers to not block websites or impose certain limits on users; wireless providers were given greater freedom to interfere with consumer's Internet access. In December 2010, the FCC passed a final version on a 3-2 vote.

President Obama issued a statement of support, and later threatened to veto any House legislation to repeal the rules. Support also came from a number of business and technology leaders and public interest groups. AT&T CEO Randall Stephenson backed the rules as a way to eliminate regulatory uncertainty. The rules received criticism from Verizon, which argued they exceed the FCC's authority, and from some public interest groups such as Free Press, which argued the rules were too narrow and should be expanded. Verizon Wireless and Free Press sued the FCC, although Free Press dropped its lawsuit.

In 2012, Genachowski appointed Harvard law professor Jonathan Zittrain to chair an FCC Open Internet Advisory Committee created to evaluate the effectiveness of the neutrality rules. The group is made up of representatives from Mozilla, Netflix, the Center for Democracy and Technology, AT&T, Internet Society, Comcast, Disney, and others. As of April 2013, no evaluation has been provided to the public.

In July 2012, during the FCC review of Verizon Wireless' purchase of spectrum held by cable operators, the FCC settled an investigation into Verizon Wireless over violation of open Internet rules on its 700 MHz spectrum. The FCC found the Verizon had asked Google to remove applications from the Android marketplace that allow "tethering" to turn smartphones into Wi-Fi hotspots. Verizon had typically charged a "tethering fee" of $20 for their service. As part of the settlement, Verizon agreed to pay $1.25 million to the U.S. Treasury.

=== International ===
Genachowski has promoted an international Multistakeholder Model of Internet governance to protect Internet freedom and warned against proposed new regulations by the International Telecommunication Union, an arm of the UN, that could result in a more government-oriented, top-down model of internet governance.

In November 2012, Genachowski and Hector Olavarria Tapia, Mexico's Secretariat of Communications and Transport, signed an initiative to combat theft of mobile devices and their sale across the border. Under the program, wireless carriers will build and maintain an international database to prevent stolen devices from being reactivated in Mexico or the United States. Earlier in the year, major U.S. carriers signed an agreement with the FCC to begin disabling stolen devices within the United States.

=== Public Safety Initiatives ===
Genachowski and New York City Mayor Michael Bloomberg unveiled the nation's first comprehensive emergency notification system for cellphones at Ground Zero in May 2011. The Personal Localized Alerting Network (PLAN) is a free service to send emergency text alerts to citizens in an area with "imminent threats to safety." It is a partnership between the FCC, FEMA, New York City, and wireless carriers. Genachowski has also announced a plan to create a "Next Generation 911" emergency response system that will enable text, video, and photo messages and automatic location information to be sent to 911.

In response to a nationwide rise in smartphone theft and related assaults, Genachowski, major city police chiefs, and wireless providers launched a national database to track stolen smartphones. The initiative will allow users to disable use of their device once reported stolen, lowering the black market value. From mid-2011 to mid-2012, roughly one in three robberies nationwide involved theft of a cellphone, according to the FCC. The four largest wireless carriers are expected to put databases in place by 2013, and complete a merged database in 2014.

Genachowski has campaigned against "distracted driving", or the use of mobile devices or texting applications while driving. In 2009, Genachowski and Transportation Secretary Ray LaHood launched a campaign to reform laws and change social norms. He has advocated in the media and testified before the Senate, and spurred awareness campaigns such as AT&T's "It Can't Wait" initiative. Over 100,000 car crashes each year involve texting, according to the National Safety Council.

== Personal life ==
His parents are Eastern European Jews who survived the Holocaust. His cousin, Menachem Genack, is an Orthodox rabbi and the CEO of the Orthodox Union Kosher Division. He was previously married to Rachel Goslins and to journalist Martha Raddatz.

Genachowski was named by President Barack Obama to lead the United States delegation for the commemoration of the 65th anniversary of the liberation of Auschwitz.

== See also ==
- List of law clerks for the third seat of the Supreme Court of the United States

Political offices
Preceded by Michael Copps; Acting	Chairman of the Federal Communications Commission; 2009–2013	Succeeded by Tom Wheeler
