= Mozilla Corp. v. FCC =

2019 American court case

Mozilla v. FCC
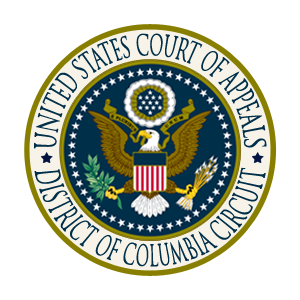
- Court: United States Court of Appeals for the District of Columbia Circuit
- Full case name: Mozilla Corporation v. Federal Communications Commission and United States of America
- Argued: February 1 2019
- Decided: October 1 2019
- Citation: 940 F. 3d 1

Holding
- The FCC has the authority to reclassify Internet services under the Communications Act of 1934, but does not have the authority to restrict state or local laws regulating Internet services.

Court membership
- Judges sitting: Stephen F. Williams, Patricia Millett, Robert L. Wilkins

Case opinions
- Per curiam
- Concurrence: Millett
- Concurrence: Wilkins
- Concur/dissent: Williams

Mozilla Corp. v. FCC, 940 F. 3d 1 (D.C. Cir., 2019) was a ruling the United States Court of Appeals for the District of Columbia Circuit in 2019 related to net neutrality in the United States. The case centered on the Federal Communications Commission (FCC)'s decision in 2017 to rollback its prior 2015 Open Internet Order, reclassifying Internet services as an information service rather than as a common carrier, deregulating principles of net neutrality that had been put in place with the 2015 order. The proposed rollback had been publicly criticized during the open period of discussion, and following the FCC's issuing of the rollback, several states and Internet companies sued the FCC. These cases were consolidated into the one led by the Mozilla Corporation.

The Circuit Court ruled in favor of the FCC in October 2019, relying on the Supreme Court decision of National Cable & Telecommunications Ass'n v. Brand X Internet Services (2005) that the FCC has such authority to reclassify Internet services, and thus allowed the rollback. However, the Court ruled against the FCC in attempting to block state- and local-level laws that regulated the Internet, enabling states to pass net neutrality legislation.

== Background ==
Net neutrality in the United States has been of concern since the Internet became open to public use through Internet service providers (ISPs). Net neutrality broadly encompasses the idea that all data traffic on the Internet should be treated equal, counter to past and planned actions of ISPs to offered tiered service plans that block or throttle access to selected sites at lower payment tiers, among other provisions. Within the United States, proponents of net neutrality, which typically include Democrats and large technology companies, believe it is necessary to prevent ISPs from blocking access to Internet services or to throttle the connection to these services as to maintain an open flow of information across the Internet without discrimination. Opponents of net neutrality, principally Republicans and ISPs, argue that the ability to offer tiered rates of service would help promote competition in providing Internet service across America, and enforced net neutrality regulations would stifle growth.

A central facet of the debate around net neutrality is how ISPs are classified under the Communications Act of 1934. Under this act, they may either be treated as an "information service" under Title I of the Act, or as a "common carrier service" under Title II. Common carrier classification under Title II would mean that the FCC, which is granted authority to oversee communication services in the United States, could apply regulations to ISPs, which would include enforcing the principles of net neutrality. But under Title I, the FCC would not have significant authority to regulate ISPs. The FCC's authority to classify ISPs in this matter was upheld in the Supreme Court case National Cable & Telecommunications Ass'n v. Brand X Internet Services in 2005, based on the Chevron deference principle, in which the judiciary accepts federal agencies' interpretations of ambiguous Congressional language. With the Brand X ruling left in place, the FCC initially decided to classify cable-based ISPs as information services under Title I.

== Legal history ==
In the early years of the network neutraily debate, the Federal Communications Commission attempted to sanction ISPs that blocked certain websites or services. An attempted sanction against Comcast was overturned by the Circuit Court for the District of Columbia, which ruled in Comcast Corp. v. FCC (2010) that the commission did not have authority for this type of sanction under the language of the 1934 Communications Act or the 1996 Telecommunications Act.

In the early 2010s, while under the Barack Obama administration, the FCC was favorable to implementing net neutrality positions. The first FCC Chairman in Obama's term, Julius Genachowski, was a strong proponent of net neutrality. Tom Wheeler, appointed as the new FCC Chairman in 2013, had stated he was for an open Internet but favored the notion of "fast lanes" for some traffic; but he eventually agreed to full net neutrality goals as to maintain the goals of an open Internet. The FCC introduced the FCC Open Internet Order 2010 that enshrined principles of net neutrality, while acknowledging the strictures of the Comcast ruling earlier that year. The order was challenged by ISPs, and in 2014, the Circuit Court for the District of Columbia ruled in Verizon Communications Inc. v. FCC that the FCC did not have the authority to set net neutrality requirements on ISPs unless they were classified as a common carrier. This led the FCC to issue a new Open Internet Order in 2015 that not only continued to enshrine net neutrality principles but also classified ISPs as Title II common carriers. Again, ISPs sued the FCC over this. In 2016, the DC District Court ruled in United States Telecom Ass'n v. FCC in favor of the FCC and upholding the reclassification of ISPs and the neutrality rules.

With Donald Trump becoming president in early 2017, Ajit Pai became the new Chairman of the FCC. Pai was a strong critic of FCC oversight of net neutrality. Pai believed that the FCC should allow ISPs to self-regulate, and that if there was to be regulation on net neutrality, it needed to come from Congress. With Pai as Chairman, and with Republican-appointed Commissioners outnumbering the Democrat-appointed ones 3–2, Pai led the FCC to propose a rollback of the 2015 Open Internet Order. By May 2017, the FCC issued a public notice of its rule change, titled "Restoring Internet Freedom". In addition to the rollback, the proposed rule would prevent states and local governments from passing legislation on net neutrality.

The proposed changed drew heavy criticism from proponents of net neutrality, with several organized activism events created to draw the public's attention to the regulatory change. During the public comment period, running from May to August 2017, the FCC received more than 21 million comments related to the change. Analysis of the comments found a near majority of these opposed to the rule change, even after accounting for potential fraud that had been discovered. Despite the public stance on the rule change, the FCC voted on December 14, 2017, to enforce the rollback.

== Circuit Court ruling ==
Immediately after the FCC vote in December, several states announced their intent to sue the FCC over this change. Once the rule change was published in the Federal Register in February 2018, twenty-two states and several other state and local agencies joined in the complaint lodged by Mozilla Corporation and Vimeo against the FCC, to be heard in the D.C. Circuit Court. The suit asserted that the FCC had been "arbitrary and capricious" in its handling of net neutrality, and that it ha disregarded "critical record evidence on industry practices and harm to consumers and businesses". Several parties submitted briefs arguing that net neutrality rules were required to prevent consumers from being harmed by aggressive throttling and blocking.

The case was heard before the D.C. Circuit on February 1, 2019, before Senior Circuit Judge Stephen F. Williams and Circuit Judges Patricia Millett and Robert L. Wilkins. Mozilla and the states argued that the FCC failed to analyze current market conditions correctly, had not accounted for public safety, and erred in how it classified ISPs as an information service. The plaintiffs also argued that the FCC did not have authority to block states from passing net neutrality laws. The FCC argued that the former net neutrality rules had harmed broadband investment, and that consumers would be protected by required transparency reports from ISPs.

A major point brought up by the judges was related to the 2018 California wildfires, in which it had been discovered that first responders' communications, operating through Verizon, were being throttled due to going over a certain bandwidth capacity, which significantly reduced the effectiveness of the responders to react to the changing fire conditions.

=== Concurrent events ===
While the case was pending in the D.C. Circuit , California passed the California Internet Consumer Protection and Net Neutrality Act of 2018 in September 2018. The law was written to enforce net neutrality principles for ISPs operating in California. The law was passed despite the fact that the recent FCC order prohibited states from enacting net neutrality regulations themselves. Shortly after passage, the FCC sued California for this law on the basis of the 2017 rule; the FCC was joined by several ISPs and agencies representing them in suing the state. Both sides agreed to hold off any further legislation or enforcement of the law pending the decision in the Mozilla case.

=== Decision ===
The D.C. Circuit issued its decision on October 1, 2019. In the per curiam decision, the Court voted to uphold the FCC's rollback of the 2015 Open Internet Order, ruling that the agency had authority through the prior Brand X precedent, and that the present Circuit Court judges were not at liberty to challenge that Supreme Court ruling. The decision affirmed several of the points made by the FCC in relation to the potential harm to ISPs by imposing net neutrality, and agreeed that ISPs should be classified as information services rather than as common carriers.

However, on the matter of limiting state and local-level enforcement of net neutrality, the Court ruled that the FCC had overstepped its bounds, and reversed that part of the rule. The opinion denied the claim that the FCC had implied authority on this matter, and stated "If Congress wanted Title I to vest the Commission with some form of Dormant-Commerce-Clause-like power to negate States' statutory (and sovereign) authority just by washing its hands of its own regulatory authority, Congress could have said so." In addition, the Court ordered the FCC to review how its rule change affected public safety as related to the California wildfire incident, and its the impact on low-income telecommunications services.

Each of the three judges wrote an additional opinion. Circuit Judges Millett and Wilkens concurred with the per curiam decision, while Senior Circuit Judge Williams concurred in part and dissented in part. All three reflected on the changes to the structure of the Internet since Brand X and pointed out that by 2019, ISPs were better classified as information services than as common carriers. At the time of Brand X, the Supreme Court had relied on the existing of core technologies like caching at the ISP level and the Domain Name Service to justify that ISPs are information services. In the Mozilla ruling, the judges noted that now, Internet services are defined by information that consumers can access, and as such, ISPs should be able to offer those consumers who want faster access to that information the capabilities to offer tiered service without regulation.

== Subsequent events ==
Parties that supported the plaintiffs, including the Computer & Communications Industry Association, other trade groups, and some of the states that joined with them sought an en banc hearing from the full Circuit Court, but this request was denied in February 2020. While the decision was seen as a short-term defeat for net neutrality proponents, the decision clearing the way for state and local regulation was viewed more favorable by those proponents. California's net neutrality law remained in limbo due to the Mozilla ruling, until the Biden administration dropped the federal suit against the state in 2021. Four other states have passed or have pending legislation to enforce net neutrality at the state level while an additional 33 other states along with the District of Columbia have proposed bills favoring net neutrality. However, it is expected that there will be ongoing legal challenges from ISPs for these state bills that may limit their enforcement.

The FCC issued another public commenting period from February to March 2020 to gain input on the factors of public safety, reduced infrastructure spending, and impact on the Lifeline program as identified in the Circuit Court ruling. Following the public comment period, the FCC voted again in October 2020 on the same 3–2 lines to uphold their prior decision, with Pai, in a separate post, stating that based on the public comments he was "confident that the regulatory framework we set forth in the Restoring Internet Freedom Order appropriately and adequately addresses each issue." In 2024, during the Biden administration with new FCC Chairwoman Jessica Rosenworcel, the commission again sought to reverse its stance on regulating network neutrality via the Safeguarding and Securing the Open Internet Order, issued in May of that year. That rulemaking document was overturned by the Sixth Circuit Court of Appeals in Ohio Telecom Association v. FCC in 2025, which used the Supreme Court 2024 decision in Loper Bright Enterprises v. Raimondo that eliminated the use of the Chevron deference for evaluating executive branch decisions.
