= Net neutrality by country =

Net neutrality is the principle that governments should mandate Internet service providers to treat all data on the Internet the same, and not discriminate or charge differently by user, content, website, platform, application, type of attached equipment, or method of communication. For instance, under these principles, internet service providers are unable to intentionally block, slow down or charge money for specific websites and online content.

== Summary ==
Country	Status on net neutrality	Year
Argentina	Not enforced	2014
Australia	Not enforced	
Bangladesh	Not enforced	2025
Belgium	Enforced	
Brazil	Enforced	2014
Canada	Enforced	
Chile	Enforced	2010
China	Not enforced	
India	Enforced	2018
Indonesia	Not enforced	
Israel	Enforced	2014
Japan	Enforced	
Mexico	Enforced	
Netherlands	Enforced	2012
New Zealand	Not enforced	
Russia	Enforced	2016
Slovenia	Enforced	2013
South Korea	Enforced	
Sri Lanka	Not enforced	
Switzerland	Enforced	2021
United Kingdom	Enforced	2016
United States	Not enforced	2024
Uruguay	Not enforced	

== By country ==
=== Argentina ===
The Law 27,078, of 2014, under the Article 56 establishes the right of users to access, use, send, receive or offer any content, application, service or protocol through the Internet without any restriction, discrimination, distinction or blocking. Article 57 forbids "ICT service providers" from blocking, interfering, or restricting any content, application, service, or protocol; price discrimination by virtue of its contents. Article 57 also establishes an exception allowing blocking or restrictions solely under a judicial order or by the user of the service.

Since 2017, mobile telephone carriers like Claro, Movistar and Personal have been offering free traffic for WhatsApp messages, voice recordings, attached videos and pictures.

=== Bangladesh ===
In 2024, a National Broadband Policy made broad suggestion to ensure neutrality for the type of content provided.

=== Belgium ===
In Belgium, net neutrality was discussed in the parliament in June 2011. Three parties (CD&V, N-VA and PS) jointly proposed a text to introduce the concept of net neutrality in the telecom law.

=== Brazil ===
In 2014, the Brazilian government passed a law which expressly upholds net neutrality, "guaranteeing equal access to the Internet and protecting the privacy of its users in the wake of U.S. spying revelations".

The Brazilian Civil Rights Framework for the Internet (in Portuguese: Marco Civil da Internet, officially Law No 12.965) became law on 23 April 2014 at the Global Multistakeholder Meeting on the Future of Internet Governance. It governs the use of the Internet in Brazil, through forecasting principles, guarantees, rights and duties to those who use the network as well as the determination of guidelines for state action. The legislation was used as basis to block the popular WhatsApp application in Brazilian territory, a decision lifted soon afterwards, experts claiming that it was, in actuality, against the Framework, which was misinterpreted by the judiciary.

=== Canada ===
In a January 25, 2011 decision, the Canadian Radio-television and Telecommunications Commission (CRTC) ruled that usage-based billing could be introduced. Prime Minister Harper signaled that the government may be looking into the ruling: "We're very concerned about CRTC's decision on usage-based billing and its impact on consumers. I've asked for a review of the decision." Some have suggested that the ruling adversely affects net neutrality, since it discriminates against media that is larger in size, such as audio and video.

In 2005, Canada's second-largest telecommunications company, Telus, began blocking access to a server that hosted a website supporting a labour strike against the company.

=== Chile ===
On 13 June 2010, the National Congress of Chile amended the country's telecommunications law in order to preserve network neutrality, becoming the first country in the world to do so. This came after an intensive campaign on blogs, Twitter, and other social networks. The law, published on 26 August 2010, added three articles to the General Law of Telecommunications, forbidding ISPs from arbitrarily blocking, interfering with, discriminating, hindering or restricting an Internet user's right to use, send, receive or offer any legal content, application, service or any other type of legal activity or use through the Internet. ISPs must offer Internet access in which content is not arbitrarily treated differently based on its source or ownership.

=== China ===
The People's Republic of China's (PRC) approach to internet policy does not account for Net Neutrality as the government uses ISPs to inspect and regulate the content that is available to their citizens. They typically block both foreign and domestic sites that the government wishes to censor in their country, using software and hardware that together are known as the "Great Firewall". Many of the sites that are on the Great Firewall's blacklist are there because they provide information that the government cannot effectively alter permanently, such as large social media IPs or information sites such as Wikipedia.

According to Thomas Lum, a specialist in Asian Affairs: "Since its founding in 1949, the PRC has exerted great effort in manipulating the flow of information and prohibiting the dissemination of viewpoints that criticize the government or stray from the official Communist party view. The introduction of Internet technology in the mid-1990s presented a challenge to government control over news sources, and by extension, over public opinion. While the Internet has developed rapidly, broadened access to news, and facilitated mass communications in China, many forms of expression online, as in other mass media, are still significantly stifled. Empirical studies have found that China has one of the most sophisticated content-filtering Internet regimes in the world. The Chinese government employs increasingly sophisticated methods to limit content online, including a combination of legal regulation, surveillance, and punishment to promote self-censorship, as well as technical controls."

=== European Union ===
When the European Commission consulted on the EU's 2002 regulatory framework for electronic communications in November 2007, it examined the possible need for legislation to mandate network neutrality, countering the potential damage, if any, caused by non-neutral broadband access. The European Commission stated that prioritisation "is generally considered to be beneficial for the market so long as users have choice to access the transmission capabilities and the services they want" and "consequently, the current EU rules allow operators to offer different services to different customers groups, but not allow those who are in a dominant position to discriminate in an anti-competitive manner between customers in similar circumstances". However, the European Commission highlighted that Europe's current legal framework cannot effectively prevent network operators from degrading their customers' services. Therefore, the European Commission proposed that it should be empowered to impose a minimum quality of services requirements. In addition, an obligation of transparency was proposed to limit network operators' ability to set up restrictions on end-users' choice of lawful content and applications.

On 19 December 2009, the so-called "Telecoms Package" came into force and EU member states were required to implement the Directive by May 2011. According to the European Commission the new transparency requirements in the Telecoms Package would mean that "consumers will be informed—even before signing a contract—about the nature of the service to which they are subscribing, including traffic management techniques and their impact on service quality, as well as any other limitations (such as bandwidth caps or available connection speed)". Regulation (EC) No 1211/2009 of the European Parliament and of the Council of 25 November 2009 established the Body of European Regulators for Electronic Communications (BEREC) and the Office Body of European Regulators of Electronic Communications. BEREC's main purpose is to promote cooperation between national regulatory authorities, ensuring a consistent application of the EU regulatory framework for electronic communications.

The European Parliament voted the EU Commission's September 2013 proposal on its first reading in April 2014 and the Council adopted a mandate to negotiate in March 2015. Following the adoption of the Digital Single Market Strategy by the commission on 6 May, Heads of State and Government agreed on the need to strengthen the EU telecoms single market. After 18 months of negotiations, the European Parliament, Council and Commission reached two agreements on the end to roaming charges and on the first EU-wide rules on net neutrality on 30 June 2015, to be completed by an overhaul of EU telecoms rules in 2016. Specifically, article 3 of EU Regulation 2015/2120 sets the basic framework for ensuring net neutrality across the entire European Union. However, the regulation's text has been criticized as offering loopholes that can undermine the regulation's effectiveness. Some EU member states, such as Slovenia and the Netherlands, have stronger net neutrality laws.

Article 3 of EU Regulation 2015/2120 sets the basic framework for ensuring net neutrality across the entire European Union. However, the regulation's text has been criticized as offering loopholes that can undermine the regulation's effectiveness. In Germany mobile device ISP's like Deutsche Telekom and Vodafone are offering services that might be seen as undermining net neutrality. The government agency overseeing the market (Bundesnetzagentur) stated, in general these plans are in alignment with net neutrality but forced the companies to adapt some changes.

=== France ===
In France, on 12 April 2011, the commission for economic affairs of the French parliament approved the report of MP Laure de La Raudière (UMP). The report contains 9 proposals. Propositions n°1 & 2 act on net neutrality.

=== Indonesia ===
Indonesia has not adopted net neutrality. Indihome, a subsidiary of Telkom Indonesia, is deliberately blocking Netflix and claimed that it is due to censorship and pornographic contents. On the other hand, it promotes Iflix, a Malaysian-based company that provides similar service as Netflix. Ironically the M-17 rated contents are also available on Iflix without further censorship from the provider.

=== India ===
On 8 February 2016, the Telecom Regulatory Authority of India (TRAI) banned differential pricing of data services. As per TRAI's press release, the regulator had multiple responses soliciting different opinions with respect to its consultation paper. Considering all the responses, the regulator decided to have an ex ante regulation instead of a case by case tariff investigation regime. According to the TRAI this decision was reached in order to give the industry participants the much needed certainty and in view of the high costs of regulation in terms of time and resources that will be required for investigating each case of tariff discrimination. Ruling prohibits any service provider from offering or charging discriminatory tariffs for data services on the basis of content and also prohibits any agreement or contract which might have effect of discriminatory tariffs for data services or may assist the service provider in any manner to evade the regulation. It also specifies financial disincentives for contravention of regulation. However, the ruling does not prescribe a blanket ban on differential pricing and provides an exception in case of public emergency or for providing emergency services. Discriminatory tariffs are allowed in the case of an emergency. Lastly, according to TRAI this ruling should not be considered the end of the net neutrality debate. The regulator has promised to keep a close view on the developments in the market and may undertake a review after two years or at an earlier date, as it may deem fit.

In March 2015, the TRAI released a formal consultation paper on Regulatory Framework for Over-the-top (OTT) services, seeking comments from the public. The consultation paper was criticised for being one-sided and having confusing statements. It was condemned by various politicians and Internet users. By 24 April 2015, over a million emails had been sent to TRAI demanding net neutrality. The consultation period ended on 7 January 2016.

Ultimately, in the year 2018, the Indian Government unanimously approved new regulations supporting net neutrality. The regulations are considered to be the "world's strongest" net neutrality rules, guaranteeing free and open internet for nearly half a billion people, and are expected to help the culture of startups and innovation. The only exceptions to the rules are new and emerging services like autonomous driving and tele-medicine, which may require prioritised internet lanes and faster than normal speeds.

Violations of net neutrality have been common in India. Examples beyond Facebook's Internet.org include Aircel's Wikipedia Zero along with Aircel's free access to Facebook and WhatsApp, Airtel's free access to Google, and Reliance's free access to Twitter.

Facebook's Free Basics program is seen by activists as a net neutrality violation, based on its provision of free-of-cost access to dozens of sites, in collaboration with telecom operators. There were protests online and on ground against the Free Basics program. The free software movement of India also held a protest in Hyderabad and parts of Telangana and Andhra Pradesh.

=== Israel ===
In 2011, Israel's parliament passed a law requiring net neutrality in mobile broadband. These requirements were extended to wireline providers in an amendment to the law passed on 10 February 2014. The law contains an exception for reasonable network management, and is vague on a number of issues such as data caps, tiered pricing, paid prioritization and paid peering.

=== Italy ===
Since March 2009 in Italy, there is a bill called: Proposta di legge dei senatori Vincenzo VITA (PD) e Luigi Vimercati (PD) "Neutralità Delle Reti, Free Software E Societa' Dell'informazione". Senator Vimercati in an interview said that he wants "to do something for the network neutrality" and that he was inspired by Lawrence Lessig, Professor at the Stanford Law School. Vimercati said that the topic is very hard, but in the article 3 there is a reference to the concept of neutrality regard the contents. It is also a problem of transparency and for the mobile connections: we need the minimum bandwidth to guarantee the service. We need some principle to defend the consumers. It's important that the consumer has been informed if he could not access all the Internet. The bill refuses all the discrimination: related by the content, the service and the device. The bill is generally about Internet ("a statute for the Internet") and treat different topics like network neutrality, free software, giving an Internet access to everyone.

=== Japan ===
Net neutrality in the common carrier sense has been instantiated into law in many countries, including Japan. In Japan, the nation's largest phone company, Nippon Telegraph and Telephone, operates a service called Flet's Square over their FTTH high speed Internet connections.

=== Netherlands ===
In June 2011, the majority of the Dutch lower house voted for new net neutrality laws which prohibits the blocking of Internet services, usage of deep packet inspection to track customer behaviour and otherwise filtering or manipulating network traffic. The legislation applies to any telecommunications provider and was formally ratified by the Dutch senate on 8 May 2012.

=== Philippines ===
Net Neutrality does not exist in the Philippines. Telecommunications providers offer balkanized internet data package promos that give certain "free" data allocations of branded corporate platform services like social media (Facebook, Instagram, Twitter, TikTok), video (YouTube, Netflix, HBO Go), gaming (Mobile Legends, Clash of Clans, PUBG, Call of Duty), shopping (Lazada, Zalora, Shopee), and communications (Zoom, Viber, WhatsApp) - thus steering subscribers towards using their partnered services.

=== Portugal ===
As part of the European Union, Portugal is bound to the laws protecting net neutrality established by the EU in 2002. However, the Portuguese government still allows for certain kinds of pricing models which are banned under most net neutrality rules. They allow for broadband providers to offer special pricing packages in which customers can pay for extra data that is only designated for the use of specific websites. For example, one package allows customers to pay extra for more data that can be used for social media websites such as Facebook and Twitter. However, many supporters of net neutrality in Portugal have objected to this pricing model on the grounds that it creates another barrier to entry for all internet companies that are not included in the special data packages. These kinds of pricing packages are not specifically addressed in the EU net neutrality rules, so they have been allowed to continue. However, on 28 February 2018, Anacom, the telecommunications regulatory agency in Portugal, accused the country's main broadband providers, MEO, NOS, and Vodafone, of violating the EU rules on net neutrality with their extra data packages. They granted the providers up to forty days to change their pricing packages. However, the law does not specify what sanctions are appropriate, leading to an unclear future in this ongoing battle.

On 4 June 2012, the Netherlands became the first country in Europe and the second in the world, after Chile, to enact a network neutrality law. The main provision of the law requires that "Providers of public electronic communication networks used to provide Internet access services as well as providers of Internet access services will not hinder or slow down services or applications on the Internet".

European Union struck down roaming charges by creating a law in which companies cannot slow down services. There are exceptions to services being slowed down which include court order, security, or congestion on a website. Because Portugal is a member of the European Union, it must follow all guidelines set by their Body of European Regulators for Electronic Communication (BEREC). Anacom reported that majority of the complaints it received in the first half of 2018 involving the communications sector were related to billing, service failure, and cancellation of service.

=== Russia ===
In September 2007, the Russian government's Resolution No 575 introduced regulation rules of telematics services. Network operators (ISPs) could legally limit individual actions of the subscriber's network activity, if such actions threatened the normal functioning of the network. ISPs were obliged to exclude the possibility of access to information systems, network addresses, or uniform pointers which a subscriber informs the operator of communication in the form specified in the contract. The subscriber was obliged to take actions to protect the subscriber terminal from the impact of malicious software and to prevent the spread of spam and malicious software to its subscriber terminal. In reality, most Russian ISPs shaped the traffic of P2P protocols (like BitTorrent) with lower priority (P2P was about of 80% of traffic there). Also, there was a popular method, called retracker, for redirecting some BitTorrent traffic to the ISP's cache servers and other subscribers inside of a metropolitan area network (MAN). Access to MANs is usually with greater speed (2x–1000x or more, specified in the contract) and better quality than the rest of the Internet.

After almost four years of discussion, in early 2016 Federal Antimonopoly Service approved a regulation blocking ISPs from throttling or otherwise blocking any websites apart from those blocked at the request of the Federal Service for Supervision of Communications, Information Technology and Mass Media, thus protecting net neutrality in Russia.

=== Singapore ===
In 2014 and 2015, there were efforts to charge over-the-top content (OTT) providers (companies that provide streaming video). Infocomm Development Authority (IDA) has a Policy Framework for net neutrality that did not allow a surcharge. Consumers also argued that they already pay for their service and that they should not have to pay more to access the sites they want to.

=== Slovenia ===
At the end of 2012, Slovenia legislated a law of electronic communication implementing a strong principle of net neutrality. Slovenia thus became the second country in Europe to enact a net neutrality law. The Government Agency for Communications, Networks and Services (AKOS) is enforcing the law and executes inspections. In January 2015 it found zero-rating infringements at the two largest mobile network providers, Telekom Slovenije and Si.mobil (now A1), which were respectively "zero-rating the Deezer music service and the 'Hangar mapa' cloud storage service." In response, AKOS banned zero rating for all services except three owned by the state incumbent. For this, AKOS was sued by Slovenia's telecom operators for violating their own net neutrality rules. A month later the agency found similar infringements at Amis (now Simobil) and Tušmobil (now Telemach). In July 2016 the Administrative Court of the Republic of Slovenia annulled the January 2015 AKOS decisions regarding price discrimination, stating that since it does not "restrict, delay or slow down Internet traffic at the level of individual services or applications" it does not violate net neutrality. The court also said that the Slovenian Electronic Communications Act "does not prohibit zero rating outright." This ruling was in accordance with the Competition Protection Agency (CPA), who felt that the "prohibition of zero-rated services may have been detrimental rather than beneficial for consumers." Four months after the ruling of the Administrative Court, in November 2016, AKOS found Telekom Slovenije and Si.mobil in violation of net neutrality laws for discriminating against non-zero-rated traffic for customers who exceeded their monthly data limits.

=== South Africa ===
As of 2016, there is no law on net neutrality in South Africa. A White Paper was to be published by the South African government in March 2015, but it has not been published yet. However, the telecommunications regulator ICASA, and the Department of Telecommunications and Postal Services (DTPS) has been engaged in this debate. In March 2014, ICASA invited comments to its "Notice of Public Inquiry into the State of Competition in the Information and Communications Technology Sector", in which net neutrality was brought up, and comments were invited on the stakeholders' views on enforcement of net neutrality in South Africa.

Simultaneously, DTPS was in the process of providing an integrated ICT policy review, to provide recommendations on various issues of ICT policy in South Africa. They published a Green Paper and invited comments to the same. The Green Paper did not venture into the debate of net neutrality in detail and simply stated that it is an issue that must be taken into consideration. Following the Green Paper, a Discussion Paper was published in November 2014, which also invited comments. Lastly, a Final Report was published in June 2015 by DTPS providing its policy recommendations. DTPS recommended that the broad tenets of net neutrality be adopted, with principles such as transparency, no blocking of lawful content, and no unreasonable discrimination in mind. They urged the government to set appropriate exceptions to the application of network neutrality principles, such as emergency services, blocking of unlawful content, etc.

=== South Korea ===
In South Korea, VoIP is blocked on high-speed FTTH networks except where the network operator is the service provider.

=== Switzerland ===
In Switzerland, National Councillor Balthasar Glättli submitted a Draft on 2012-12-14 to enshrine net neutrality in law. In February 2013, the Federal Council requested that the parliament reject the draft. The reason given was the forthcoming partial revision of the Telecommunications Act (TCA), for which the Federal Council also intended to make proposals on the subject of net neutrality. The draft was adopted by a large majority by the National Council on 2014-06-17 and referred to the Council of States. The motion to legally establish net neutrality in law in the Telecommunications Act was rejected in the Council of States on 2015-03-15. The matter was therefore closed for the time being.

From October 2013 to October 2014, various stakeholders and experts participated in the drafting of a report on net neutrality under the leadership of the Federal Office of Communications. The major internet providers, such as Swisscom, UPC Switzerland and Sunrise Communications strongly resisted enshrining net neutrality in law. Consumer organisations, civil society groups and Schweizer Fernsehen, on the other hand, campaigned for net neutrality to be enshrined in the Telecommunications Act.

On 2014-11-07, the Swiss major internet providers came forward with a "code of conduct". In it, they promise to create "clarity on the topic of net neutrality", to jointly stand up "for an open internet" and also founded an arbitration board. On the same day, the code of conduct was published by the Digitale Gesellschaft (Schweiz), the Stiftung für Konsumentenschutz and National Councillor Balthasar Glättli sharply criticised it.

On 2017-09-06, the Federal Council adopted the dispatch on the partial revision of the Telecommunications Act. In the corresponding draft law, the only transparency obligations imposed on telecommunications service providers relate to the processing of the information they transmit (network neutrality) and the quality of their services. However, network neutrality is not further stipulated. In response, the Digitale Gesellschaft Schweiz in particular submitted its own draft law for the attention of the responsible commission elaborated with more comprehensive obligations. During the parliamentary deliberations, conduct obligations were subsequently provided for against the will of the government, which are very close to those of the European Union. This amendment was passed by Parliament at the end of March 2019. In addition to the net neutrality principle, it provides for an exemption provision for so-called special services. In addition, the behavioural obligations also still found their way into the final version of the Telecommunications Act.

Since 2021-01-01, net neutrality has been regulated in Article 12e of the Telecommunications Act. After implementation, non-network neutral services were discontinued in Switzerland.

=== United Kingdom ===
Net neutrality legislation applies in the United Kingdom as a result of the European Union's adoption of net neutrality legislation in 2015.

In comparison to the United States, the debate concerning Net Neutrality is one that has not received much attention in the United Kingdom. The officials merely refer to such a concept as an open internet, as net neutrality is a term used originally in American politics. While it does seem to be a non-issue in the UK, there is indeed a defining characteristic in the neutrality debate there, as the arguments are often shaped by regulators. Also, these arguments are often influenced by the discourse of other countries in Europe, so much of the discussions that the UK has about open internet will be linked with those of other European countries listed on this page.

In 2007, Plusnet was using deep packet inspection to implement limits and differential charges for peer-to-peer, file transfer protocol, and online game traffic. However, their network management philosophy was made clear for each package they sold, and was consistent between different websites.

In 2021 Ofcom, the country's communications regulator, announced a review of net neutrality. The UK's departure from the European Union in 2020 and issues associated with the COVID-19 pandemic in the United Kingdom allowed network owners to make a case for change. In light of this, the Retained EU Law Bill proposed repealing the remaining EU laws in the UK by the end of December 2023, including the Open Internet Access Regulations 2016 and the E-commerce Regulations 2002. If implemented, this would have ended net neutrality in the UK and allowed broadband providers to prioritise or demote traffic at will. This however did not end up affecting net neutrality within the UK. With Ofcom having published a page on monitoring compliance of the now-domestic net neutrality laws in 2024, this page also includes reports on their work and findings in regard to monitoring net neutrality up to 2023.

=== United States ===
Within the United States, regulation of Internet services falls under the Federal Communications Commission (FCC), a five-member panel appointed by the current president. Net neutrality generally falls along political party lines, with Democrats favoring the liberal principles of net neutrality, and Republicans against it, and as such, its treatment has varied with changing political climate in the current administration.

A key facet of the FCC's oversight and net neutrality is how Internet service is defined within the scope of the Communications Act of 1934, either under Title I of the Act as "information services" or under Title II as "common carrier services". If treated as a common carrier, then Internet service would be subject to regulation by the FCC, allowing the FCC to specify and enforce net neutrality principles, while if considered an information service, the FCC would have far less scrutiny over Internet services and work against the principles of net neutrality.

The FCC initially adopted policies favorable to net neutrality in 2005. Finding some service providers blocking access to some sites, the FCC issued the FCC Open Internet Order 2010 that specified six principles of net neutrality. Carriers sued the FCC over these rules, and in the case Verizon Communications Inc. v. FCC in 2014, the courts ruled that the FCC could not regulate service provides without classifying them as common carriers. The FCC subsequently issued the 2015 Open Internet Order, which classified Internet service providers as Title II common carriers, and thus allowing them to issue net neutrality principles. The 2015 rule, both in the reclassification under Title II, and the net neutrality principles, was upheld in the courts in the case United States Telecom Ass'n v. FCC heard in 2016.

With the change of administration from the Democratic Barack Obama to Republican Donald Trump in 2017, Ajit Pai, former Associate General Counsel for Verizon Communications, was appointed commissioner of the FCC. Pai, a vocal opponent of net neutrality, sought to roll back the 2015 Open Internet Order, effectively reclassifying Internet services as a Title I information service and loosing any FCC regulations on these services. Despite heavy public protest against this change, the FCC issued the rollback in December 2017. Additionally, the rollback rule stated that neither state nor local governments could override the FCC's ruling. Twenty-three states and several tech companies sued the FCC in Mozilla v. FCC (2018). The courts ruled in October 2019 that while the FCC has the right to reclassify Internet service as Title I, they cannot prevent states or local governments from enforcing stricter regulations.

This has caused the concerns of net neutrality in the United States to fall to the states, several of which had passed or had pending legislation to enforce net neutrality. Notably, California had passed its own version of net neutrality shortly after the FCC's rollback. Additionally, efforts have been made in the United States Congress to pass legislation that would define Internet services under Title II or support the principles of net neutrality, though these bills have tended to fail.

The FCC would reinstate net neutrality under the administration of Joe Biden, voting 3–2 in favor of reclassifying broadband as a public utility.

This ruling was overturned on January 2, 2025, at the eve of the second Trump administration by the 6th Circuit Appeals Court.

== See also ==
- Digital rights
- Net neutrality
- Net neutrality law
