= Ohio Telecom Association v. FCC =

2025 ruling of the USCOA for the Sixth Circuit

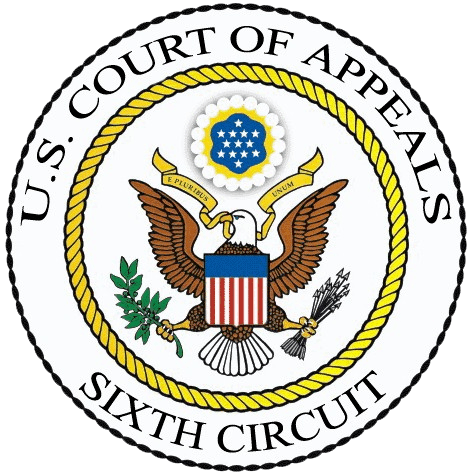
- Court: United States Court of Appeals for the Sixth Circuit
- Full case name: Ohio Telecom Association, Texas Association of Business, CTIA-The Wireless Association, NCTA-The Internet & Television Association, and USTelecom-The Broadband Association v. Federal Communications Commission
- Decided: January 2, 2025
- Citations: Ohio Telecom Ass'n v. FCC, 124 F.4th 993 (6th Cir. 2025)

Case history
- Prior actions: Promulgation of Safeguarding and Securing the Open Internet Order by the Federal Communications Commission, 2024.

Case opinions
- Richard Allen Griffin, Raymond Kethledge, John K. Bush

Laws applied
- Communications Act of 1934, Telecommunications Act of 1996

Ohio Telecom Association v. FCC, 124 F.4th 993 (6th Cir. 2025), was a ruling of the United States Court of Appeals for the Sixth Circuit, holding that the Federal Communications Commission (FCC) does not have the authority to classify broadband Internet service providers (ISPs) as "telecommunications services" that must adhere to network neutrality and common carrier principles, under the Communications Act of 1934. The ruling was the latest of several reversals and re-reversals of FCC decisions to enforce or not enforce network neutrality over the course of several successive presidential administrations.

== Background ==
In 2007, the FCC censured Comcast for violating the commission's network neutrality principles when it blocked user access to peer-to-peer networking applications. This resulted in the court challenge Comcast Corp. v. FCC in 2010, in which the U.S. Court of Appeals for the District of Columbia held that the FCC did not have ancillary jurisdiction over the content delivery choices of ISPs under the language of the Communications Act of 1934.

That ruling prompted the commission to issue the FCC Open Internet Order of 2010 which prohibited ISPs from blocking or slowing websites and applications. In Verizon Communications Inc. v. FCC in 2014, the D.C. Circuit ruled that the 2010 order also exceeded the FCC's statutory authority under the 1934 Communications Act, while the commission had already classified cable broadband Internet, and later Wireless Internet, as an "information service" per the statute's definitions as far back as 2002.

In 2014, FCC Chairman Tom Wheeler did not appeal the Verizon ruling, but instead took the court's advice on reclassification. In 2015, the FCC reclassified ISPs as "telecommunications services" under the Communications Act of 1934, as had been suggested by the judges in the Verizon ruling. The telecommunications industry challenged the commission once again in United States Telecom Association v. FCC in 2016, claiming arbitrary and capricious regulatory changes in violation of the Administrative Procedure Act. The D.C. Circuit ruled in favor of the FCC in that case and allowed Wheeler's 2015 reclassification to stand.

The United States Telecom ruling was handed down during the Barack Obama administration and Wheeler's FCC chairmanship. However, in early 2017 the FCC, now under the leadership of Ajit Pai during the first Donald Trump administration, voted to reverse its own 2015 reclassification and return to the previous state of affairs regarding regulation of ISPs. That regulatory decision was upheld by the D.C. Circuit, again as within the realm of the commission's authority, in Mozilla Corp. v. FCC in 2019. In 2024, during the Joe Biden administration with new FCC Chairwoman Jessica Rosenworcel, the commission again sought to yet again reverse its stance on regulating network neutrality via the Safeguarding and Securing the Open Internet Order, issued in May of that year, this time arguing that non-neutral network management by ISPs was unfair competition that in turn violated Federal Trade Commission regulations. That rulemaking document was immediately targeted for further lawsuits from the telecommunications industry. The latest suit was filed by several ISPs, led by the Ohio Telecommunications Association, with immediate review by the Sixth Circuit Court of Appeals.

== Circuit Court opinion ==
As in the previous network neutrality disputes before the circuit courts, the decision in Ohio Telecom Association initially revolved around the question of whether the FCC could classify or reclassify broadband service as an "information service" (which is lightly regulated) or as a "telecommunications service" (which is more heavily regulated and requires common carrier responsibilities) per the terminology of the Communications Act of 1934. The industry favored the former while the latest FCC document supported the latter as a technique for enforcing network neutrality. The industry sought to have the Safeguarding and Securing the Open Internet Order rulemaking document, which had not yet been enforced, struck down as outside of the commission's authority. On this question, the Sixth Circuit held that it was unlikely that Congress intended for broadband providers to be regulated as common carriers when the FCC's governing statute was written.

Unlike the previous rulings dating back to Comcast Corp. v. FCC in 2010, the Ohio Telecom decision was influenced by recent changes in jurisprudence practices regarding disputes over regulations by the Executive Branch of the U.S. government. First was the major questions doctrine, a relatively new statutory interpretation technique to determine whether Congress intended to delegate large regulatory schemes to Executive Branch agencies under relatively vague statutes that do not authorize that exercise of power. In Ohio Telecom, the Sixth Circuit found that regulation of network neutrality was not specifically mandated by Congress in the Communications Act of 1934 or in the Telecommunications Act of 1996, and this was a "major question" that should be addressed in a new network neutrality-specific statute.

The Sixth Circuit also considered the then-recent Supreme Court precedent Loper Bright Enterprises v. Raimondo (2024), in which the high court overturned the principle of Chevron deference established in 1984, which had directed courts to defer to an agency's interpretation of ambiguity in a law that the agency enforces. On this matter, the court determined that it would instead review the FCC's 2024 order in conjunction with a plain reading of the governing statutes and again held that the order exceeded the agency's statutory authority.

== Impact ==
As a result of the Sixth Circuit ruling, the FCC was again barred from enforcing network neutrality practices by ISPs, thus implementing the latest of several reversals and re-reversals on this topic in a series of circuit court decisions dating back to 2010. This pattern has been widely criticized for stifling progress on the network neutrality issue on behalf of broadband consumers, while needlessly politicizing the issue based on which political party is in charge at the time of a dispute. The particular Ohio Telecom ruling has also been criticized for adding uncertainty to processes in which the FCC tries to regulate telecommunications networks on behalf of consumers.

In a pattern that replicates the previous court rulings in the ongoing network neutrality dispute, pro-consumer groups largely condemned the Ohio Telecom ruling, with Public Knowledge stating "Today’s decision represents a major setback for consumers, competition, and the Open Internet. [...] Beyond net neutrality, this ruling threatens the FCC’s ability to ensure broadband privacy protections, implement ever-more-important public safety measures, [and] fight digital discrimination." The American Civil Liberties Union claimed that the ruling would restrict free speech online, while the Electronic Privacy Information Center claimed that ISPs now have fewer incentives to protect the privacy of personal data. Pro-industry groups also repeated their previous opinions, typically claiming that the ruling would prohibit heavy-handed regulation of the broadband industry by the FCC.

Meanwhile, legal experts opined that the Ohio Telecom ruling is likely the end of the long-running legal saga over the FCC's ability to enforce network neutrality, due to the influence of the newfound major questions doctrine and the apparent end of judicial deference to FCC decisions per the 2024 Loper Bright ruling by the Supreme Court.
