= United States Telecom Association v. FCC (2016) =

- Court: United States Court of Appeals for the District of Columbia Circuit
- Full case name: United States Telecom Association v. Federal Communications Commission and United States of America
- Argued: December 4, 2015
- Decided: June 14, 2016
- Citation: 825 F. 3d 674

Holding
- The FCC has the authority, under the Communications Act of 1934 to reclassify broadband Internet from "information services" to "telecommunications services" and to enforce differing regulations accordingly.

Case opinions
- Majority: David S. Tatel, Sri Srinivasan
- Concur/dissent: Stephen F. Williams

United States Telecom Association v. FCC, 825 F.3d 674 (D.C. Cir. 2016), was a ruling by the U.S. Court of Appeals for the D.C. Circuit upholding an action by the Federal Communications Commission (FCC) the previous year in which broadband Internet was reclassified as a "telecommunications service" under the Communications Act of 1934, after which Internet service providers (ISPs) were required to follow common carrier regulations.

This decision was a victory for network neutrality, in which Internet service providers were prohibited from discriminating against certain content and applications or prioritizing others. However, the ruling became largely moot due to actions taken by later leaders of the FCC.

== Background ==
In 2007, the Federal Communications Commission (FCC) censured Comcast for violating the commission's network neutrality principles when it interfered with its users' access to peer-to-peer networking applications. This resulted in the court challenge Comcast Corp. v. FCC in 2010, in which the U.S. Court of Appeals for the District of Columbia held that the FCC did not have ancillary jurisdiction over the content delivery choices of Internet service providers under the language of the Communications Act of 1934.

In that ruling, the Circuit Court hinted that it would accept separate jurisdictional arguments under other provisions of the 1934 Communications Act or the 1996 Telecommunications Act. This prompted the FCC to establish new rules regarding non-discriminatory delivery of Internet content. The updated rules were released later that year as the FCC Open Internet Order of 2010. These rules would forbid ISPs from blocking or slowing online services. The industry was unhappy with those new rules as well, with Verizon taking the lead in another court challenge, requesting judicial review of the Open Internet Order, again at the Circuit Court for the District of Columbia, with a charge that the FCC had again surpassed its regulatory authority.

In Verizon Communications Inc. v. FCC in 2014, the circuit court ruled that the FCC could not compel ISPs to refrain from discrimination because such a regulation could only be enforced against entities that the commission had classified as "telecommunications services" under the provisions of the 1934 Communications Act, while the commission had already classified cable broadband Internet, and later Wireless Internet, as an "information service" per this process as far back as 2002. However, the court hinted that the FCC could require Internet service providers to exercise network neutrality by reclassifying them as "telecommunications services" that were in turn required to act as common carriers.

In 2014, FCC Chairman Tom Wheeler responded to that decision by stating that the commission would not appeal the Verizon ruling, but would instead take the court's advice on reclassification of Internet service providers in the interests of non-discriminatory content delivery. In 2015, the FCC reclassified Internet service providers as "telecommunications services" under the Communications Act of 1934, as had been suggested by the judges in the Verizon ruling.

This led to yet another Circuit court challenge from the industry. The United States Telecom Association (USTA) filed suit against the FCC immediately after the reclassification, this time claiming arbitrary and capricious regulatory changes in violation of the Administrative Procedure Act, and that the Commission lacked the statutory authority to enact the reclassification.

== Circuit court ruling ==
The circuit court held that the Federal Communications Commission has the statutory authority to classify or reclassify regulated technologies and companies within the provisions of the Communications Act of 1934. The commission's previous classification of cable modem Internet service had been upheld by the U.S. Supreme Court as within its regulatory authority in National Cable & Telecommunications Ass'n v. Brand X Internet Services (2005); that ruling was in turn supported by Chevron deference in which courts refer to an agency's subject matter expertise.

In the present case, the court found that the FCC had provided adequate explanation and legal justification for its 2015 decision to reclassify broadband Internet as a "telecommunications service", and that the petitioners (USTA) failed to deliver compelling arguments on how this was beyond the commission's authority. The USTA's argument about violation of the Administrative Procedure Act rested on that statute's requirement for "sufficient factual detail and rationale for the rule to permit interested parties to comment meaningfully", and the court rejected USTA's claim that the Commission failed to honor either of those requirements. For similar reasons, the court also rejected a USTA claim of a violation of the Regulatory Flexibility Act.

As a result, the circuit court rejected the USTA's arguments and upheld the legality of the FCC's reclassification decision. Thus, Internet service providers would henceforth be forbidden from discriminating against any content or applications as delivered over their networks.

== Impact and subsequent developments ==
The decision was immediately described as a victory for network neutrality, as well as a victory for the Obama administration and then-FCC Chairman Tom Wheeler. The new non-discrimination rules were set to go into effect later in 2016, but were put on hold while the ISP industry attempted an appeal to the U.S. Supreme Court. The appeal request, brought by several telecommunications firms and ultimately falling under the case name Berninger v. Federal Communications Commission, was denied certiorari by the Supreme Court in 2018 and the circuit court decision was allowed to stand. Justice Brett Kavanaugh abstained due to his previous involvement with the case in the lower courts.

However, by that time an appeal was moot because in 2017 the FCC, now under the leadership of Ajit Pai during the first Donald Trump administration, had already voted to overturn its 2015 reclassification and return to the previous state of affairs regarding regulation of ISPs. That regulatory decision was framed as Restoring Internet Freedom in the document's title, and itself attracted widespread controversy as an illustration of the FCC's inconsistent stance on network neutrality based on its shifting leadership and political outlook. That action by the FCC was upheld by the D.C. Circuit Court, again as within the realm of the commission's authority, in Mozilla Corp. v. Federal Communications Commission (2019). In 2024, the Joe Biden administration and the then-current leadership of the FCC expressed support for yet another reversal, and restoration of the 2015 reclassification decision that was upheld in the United States Telecom ruling. Under Chairwoman Jessica Rosenworcel, the FCC issued the commission again sought to reverse its stance on regulating network neutrality via the Safeguarding and Securing the Open Internet Order. That document was immediately challenged by the telecommunications industry, and was overturned in Ohio Telecom Association v. FCC, thus leaving the state of affairs after the United States Telecom ruling in place.
