= National Cable & Telecommunications Ass'n v. Brand X Internet Services =

National Cable & Telecommunications Association v. Brand X Internet Services
- Supreme Court of the United States

Argued March 29, 2005 Decided June 27, 2005
- Full case name: National Cable & Telecommunications Association, et al. v. Brand X Internet Services, et al.
- Docket no.: 04-277
- Citations: 545 U.S. 967 (more) 125 S. Ct. 2688; 162 L. Ed. 2d 820; 2005 U.S. LEXIS 5018; 18 Fla. L. Weekly Fed. S 482

Case history
- Prior: FCC order affirmed in part, vacated in part, remanded, Brand X Internet Servs. v. FCC, 345 F.3d 1120 (9th Cir. 2003); rehearing, rehearing en banc denied, 2004 U.S. App. LEXIS 8023 (9th Cir. Mar. 31, 2004); cert. granted, sub nom. Nat'l Cable & Telecomms. Ass'n v. Brand X Internet Servs., 543 U.S. 1018 (2004).
- Subsequent: On remand, sub nom. Brand X Internet Servs. v. FCC, 435 F.3d 1053 (9th Cir. 2006).

Holding
- Per the Telecommunications Act of 1996, the Federal Communications Commission is eligible for Chevron deference by the courts when routine regulatory decisions are challenged.

Court membership
- Chief Justice William Rehnquist Associate Justices John P. Stevens · Sandra Day O'Connor; Antonin Scalia · Anthony Kennedy; David Souter · Clarence Thomas; Ruth Bader Ginsburg · Stephen Breyer

Case opinions
- Majority: Thomas, joined by Rehnquist, Stevens, O'Connor, Kennedy, Breyer
- Concurrence: Stevens
- Concurrence: Breyer
- Dissent: Scalia, joined by Souter, Ginsburg (part I)

Laws applied
- Telecommunications Act of 1996

National Cable & Telecommunications Association v. Brand X Internet Services, 545 U.S. 967 (2005), was a United States Supreme Court case in which the court held that decisions by the Federal Communications Commission (FCC) on how to regulate Internet service providers are eligible for Chevron deference, in which the judiciary defers to an administrative agency's expertise under its governing statutes. The case concerned routine regulatory processes at the FCC and applied to interpretations of the Communications Act of 1934 and Telecommunications Act of 1996, but the ruling also served as an important but indirect precedent on the matter of regulating network neutrality in the United States, While the precedent still holds for general FCC policy processes, it has become less influential for network neutrality due to subsequent changes in the judiciary's attitudes toward deferring to the agency's expertise.

== Background ==
Per the Telecommunications Act of 1996 and its predecessor the Communications Act of 1934, the Federal Communications Commission (FCC) is authorized to enforce regulations against new companies, products, and services in the telecommunications field by classifying them into one of several "titles" in the statute. At issue in this case are Title I and Title II of the 1996 Act. If the Commission classifies a given service under Title I in the statute, it is considered to be an "information service" and is subjected to relatively lenient economic regulations. If that service is classified under Title II, it is considered to be a "telecommunications service" and is subjected to much stricter common carrier regulations on the content of messages and prices charged to customers.

With the advent of Internet service providers (ISPs) available to the general public in the 1990s, early services were provided via DSL by telephone companies that were subjected to traditional Title II regulations. Later cable modem service was typically provided by cable TV companies that were subjected to traditional, and less restrictive, Title I regulations. The FCC classified cable modem Internet service as an "information service" in 2002. In the early years of home Internet service, this resulted in a confusing situation in which different types of ISPs were subjected to different levels of telecommunications regulation by the FCC.

After the 2002 classification decision, Brand X, a DSL-based ISP, requested judicial review because it had been subjected to tougher regulations than many of its competitors based on network delivery method (telephone vs. cable) rather than quality of service or customer satisfaction.

The case was initially heard at the U.S. Court of Appeals for the Ninth Circuit under the name Brand X Internet Services v. FCC. That court ruled that the 2002 classification decision by the FCC, in which cable modem was determined to be an "information service", was in error. That was because cable modem service had already been confirmed as a "telecommunications service" under the 1996 Act (and therefore eligible for stricter regulations) in the Ninth Circuit precedent AT&T Corp. v. City of Portland in 2000.

The FCC believed that the Circuit Court should not have second-guessed its regulatory decision, and appealed to the U.S. Supreme Court. Meanwhile, the National Cable & Telecommunications Association (NCTA), an industry trade group that favored the lesser regulations under the "information service" classification, joined the suit.

== Opinion of the court ==
=== Arguments ===
The case was accepted by the Supreme Court under the new title National Cable & Telecommunications Association v. Brand X Internet Services. The Supreme Court, in an unexpected act, decided to review the dispute not as a matter of precedent (as the Circuit Court did) but as a matter of judicial deference to the expertise of an administrative agency. In particular, the administrative law principle of Chevron deference dictates that when a statute passed by Congress instructs an agency like the FCC on how to regulate its field of expertise, if that statute was written in an ambiguous and open-ended fashion, this indicates that Congress intended the agency to exercise its expertise on a case-by-case basis. Subsequently, whenever an agency regulatory decision is challenged in court, judges should assume that agency personnel are experts on the topic and the best qualified to assess the issue at hand. Thus, judges should defer to the agency's expertise and not second-guess its decisions.

Brand X argued that when the agency decision is clearly in error, Chevron deference should not apply. The company argued that Internet service should be classified as a "telecommunications service" under the 1996 Act, because this would subject all ISPs to the same regulations, thus leveling the playing field, while all would be considered common carriers with robust obligations to customers and to the public.

The NCTA argued that the FCC's classification decision was correct because the 1996 Act defines "information service" as "the offering of a capability for generating, acquiring, storing, transforming, processing, retrieving, utilizing, or making available information via telecommunications, and includes electronic publishing", all of which could be used to describe cable modem Internet service. The NCTA was in favor of judicial deference toward the FCC's decision, arguing that the agency's regulators, rather than judges, possessed the required expertise on the matter.

=== Ruling ===
In a 6–3 decision, the Supreme Court held that the Telecommunications Act of 1996 enabled the FCC to make classification decisions within certain parameters, but Congress included enough ambiguity and vagueness to support the assumption that it intended the FCC to handle such decisions on a flexible and case-by-case basis. Thus, the court concluded that Chevron deference was merited, and upheld the FCC's decision to classify DSL services and cable modem services differently. In an unusual procedural twist, this overturned the Circuit Court ruling, not out of disagreement but under the decision to approach the matter via judicial deference rather than the rule of precedent. The main question before the court also soon became moot, because the classification of DSL services and cable modem services was aligned when, in 2005, the FCC decided to reclassify DSL as an information service.

In an influential dissenting opinion, Justice Antonin Scalia disagreed with the FCC's characterizations of "telecommunications service" and "information service" in all of the relevant classification decisions. Scalia concluded that these decisions created an untenable situation in the ISP marketplace, with different companies being subjected to different levels of regulation. However, Scalia ultimately placed the blame on Congress for its poor construction of the 1996 Act, which in turn hobbled the FCC's ability to regulate new technologies and markets.

== Impact ==
=== Deference to FCC regulations ===
The Brand X ruling is often cited in critiques of outdated telecommunications policy in the United States, as the Telecommunications Act of 1996 is unable to address new technologies that arose after its passage, and saddles the FCC with procedures based on old technologies. Due to convergence in the industry, previous network delivery methods and data protocols (e.g. Internet data and voice telephone calls) came together in new forms while the FCC is forced to regulate each new service under rules written by Congress for older technologies and network architectures. This in turn requires the FCC to formulate confusing arguments to justify its classification decisions, while courts must embark on equally confusing analyses to determine if such classifications comply with the law.

Supreme Court Justice Clarence Thomas has criticized the Brand X ruling's dependence on judicial deference, stating in two dissenting opinions for unrelated cases that the decision "has taken this Court to the precipice of administrative absolutism. Under its rule of deference, agencies are free to invent new (purported) interpretations of statutes and then require courts to reject their own prior interpretations." Thomas has suggested that the Supreme Court should revisit Brand X, because he now sees the ruling as "inconsistent with the Constitution, the Administrative Procedure Act (APA), and traditional tools of statutory interpretation."

Chevron deference was overturned in June 2024 in Loper Bright Enterprises v. Raimondo, ruling that such deference was inconsistent with separation of powers and the Administrative Procedure Act. This created uncertainty on the usefulness of Brand X as a precedent on FCC authority in future disputes on how to regulate telecommunications service providers.

=== Network neutrality ===
Until 2024, Brand X was considered an important precedent in the debate over the regulation of network neutrality in the United States, as it established that the FCC has the authority to classify Internet service as either an "information service" or a "telecommunications service" based on network delivery methods, rather than customer satisfaction or other public interest-oriented concerns. The inflexible classification process became a crucial issue in later years when the FCC attempted to penalize non-neutral behavior by ISPs via existing regulations within the "information service" or "telecommunications service" designations. However, the lack of a statutory process allowing flexibility in those decisions, or handling objections to them, resulted in numerous and inconsistent court rulings on the matter of net neutrality regulation, including Comcast Corp. v. FCC, Verizon Communications Inc. v. FCC, and United States Telecom Association v. FCC. This resulted in some clarification of the FCC's regulatory classification process, but also created an unresolved conflict over whether and how the commission has the authority to regulate network neutrality. That conundrum remains unresolved to the present day.

When Chevron deference was overturned in 2024 in Loper Bright Enterprises v. Raimondo, opponents of network neutrality regulation by the FCC formulated new legal challenges to such practices. In Ohio Telecom Association v. FCC in 2025, the Sixth Circuit ruled that in the absence of Chevron deference, the FCC did not have the authority to classify internet service providers under Title II, effectively ending net neutrality regulation unless Congress updates or replaces the 1996 Telecommunications Act to address net neutrality directly.
