= California Internet Consumer Protection and Net Neutrality Act of 2018 =

State law in California, US

California State Legislature
- Full name: California Internet Consumer Protection and Net Neutrality Act of 2018
- Introduced: January 3, 2018
- Assembly voted: August 30, 2018
- Senate voted: August 31, 2018
- Signed into law: September 30, 2018
- Sponsor(s): Scott Wiener
- Governor: Jerry Brown
- Code: Civil Code
- Section: 3100
- Resolution: SB822 (2017-2018 Session)

Status: Current legislation

The California Internet Consumer Protection and Net Neutrality Act of 2018 is a law in California designed to protect net neutrality. It was signed into law on September 30, 2018.

The act prevents internet service providers from doing the following things:

- Blocking lawful traffic
- Slowing lawful traffic
- Receiving payment from an edge provider (e.g. website, website host, content provider) for many things
- Paid-prioritization
- Getting paid for Zero-rating
- Zero-rating some content in a category, but not all content in that category (e.g. zero rating Facebook, but normal treatment for Google Plus)
- Preventing users from using their own devices
- Not being transparent about "network management practices, performance, and commercial terms"
- Attempting to circumvent these laws.

The act has been lauded as the "gold standard" of net neutrality laws.

== Responses ==
Within hours, the United States Department of Justice responded by suing the state of California, claiming that states have no jurisdiction over the Internet. California has said that they will fight the suit. A separate lawsuit from four lobbying groups that represent the major United States terrestrial and mobile communication carriers, United States Telecom Association, CTIA, NCTA and the American Cable Association, also sued the state of California for similar reasons as the Justice Department, claiming that the state does not have authority to regulate Internet providers.

The cases were put on hold during litigation of Mozilla v. FCC, a multi-party suit which challenged the 2017 FCC order that had reclassified ISPs as Title I information services under the Communications Act of 1934 and rolled back net neutrality provisions; this same order had denied that states had authority to override the FCC's rules related to net neutrality. Mozilla v. FCC was decided in October 2019, upholding most of the FCC's new rules but did find that the FCC did not have power to restrict state and local governments from setting their own net neutrality provisions.

Both the DOJ and the industry's suit against California over the law was restarted in August 2020 following the conclusion of the Mozilla case. With the election of Joe Biden as president in January 2021 and the indication that the FCC would likely change its rules to be favorable of net neutrality, the DOJ dropped its suit against California. On February 23, 2021, Federal Judge John Mendez of the U.S. District Court for the Eastern District of California denied a motion for a preliminary injunction from the telecom lobbying groups, allowing the law to go into effect. Ninth Circuit ruled unanimously in January 2022 that California's net neutrality law may continue to be enforced and cannot be overridden by the FCC as, current as of the decision, Internet services were classified as information services.
