= IGenApps =

igenapps
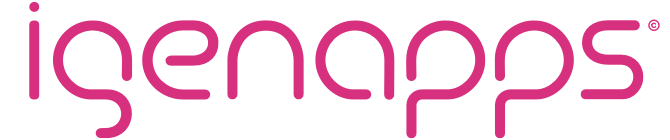
- Founded: March 2012
- Headquarters: Melbourne, Florida
- Products: DIY Mobile App & Website creation tool
- Website: igenapps.com

igenapps is a mobile app generator and a website where users, without programming skills, can create personal or business applications using their Apple or Android mobile device. igenapps users must register before using the app and be able to create apps. Users may then share their generated apps with others through social networks.

== Name and history ==
The name was a combination of three elements: the "i", meaning interactive, "gen" as an abbreviation for generation and "apps" for applications. Another interpretation of the name is "igen", as in the new Internet Generation of young users, being able to create mobile apps. igenapps was founded in March 2012 by Norman Ortiz and was available on the market by March 2010. The product was initially limited to only Windows PC users with a version of Microsoft Excel 2000 or higher. The application only allowed the creation of 4 different screen types and was based on JQuery and HTML at that time.

== Awards ==
In February 2011, igenapps was among the top 50 big ideas from the International CTIA Wireless Association. In March 2011, igenapps was awarded first place in the B!g Idea Contest. igenapps became one of the 13 finalists in the MobiTechFest held in Boston in May 2011.

== Recognition ==
igenapps has been mentioned by sites such as Tecnético, Lo que necesita and Widgia.

In February 2011, iGenApps was presented to an audience of hundreds at the Apple Premium reseller retail store iShop in Caguas, Puerto Rico. iGenApps also received coverage in El Nuevo Día, the Puerto Rican newspaper, during participation in the B!g Idea Contest. It was also mentioned by TV broadcast station Univision within the technology segment, Tecnología Libre, during the 12 o'clock news.
