= Meredith Attwell Baker =

American lawyer and businesswoman (born 1968)

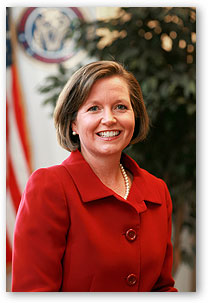

Member of the Federal Communications Commission
- In office July 31, 2009 – June 3, 2011
- President: Barack Obama

Personal details
- Born: Meredith Attwell; 1968 (age 57–58) Houston, Texas, U.S.
- Party: Republican
- Spouse: James A. Baker IV
- Relations: James A. Baker, III (father-in-law)
- Parent: Kirby Attwell (father)
- Education: Washington & Lee University (B.A.); University of Houston (J.D.)
- Website: FCC Profile

Meredith Attwell Baker (born 1968) is an American businesswoman who served as the president and chief executive officer of CTIA, an industry trade group that represents the international wireless telecommunications industry from June 2014 until April 2025. Her successor is Ajit Pai. From 2009 to 2011, Baker was a member of the United States Federal Communications Commission, nominated by U.S. President Barack H. Obama. She also served in the National Telecommunications and Information Administration as a political appointee, and was subsequently named a deputy assistant secretary of the Commerce Department by President George W. Bush in February 2007.

== Early life ==
Baker is a native of Houston, Texas. Her father, Kirby Attwell, was president of Lincoln Liberty Life Insurance, a subsidiary of Lincoln Consolidated, at which he worked with the late former Texas Democratic U.S. Senator Lloyd Bentsen. Her great-great grandfather was Isaac Van Zandt, a political leader in the Republic of Texas. The Attwells have had long-standing friendships with the Baker and Bush political families. She is a daughter-in-law of James A. Baker, III. In high school, Baker attended the Sidwell Friends School for one semester.

== Education ==
Baker earned her Bachelor of Arts in journalism and Spanish in 1990 from Washington and Lee University in Lexington, Virginia. She received a Juris Doctor from the University of Houston law school in 1994. Baker is a member of the State Bar of Texas.

== Career ==
Early in her career, Baker worked at the United States Court of Appeals for the Fifth Circuit in Houston, and later at the law firm DeLange and Hudspeth, where she focused on bankruptcy and corporate law. She worked at the U.S. Department of State in the agency's Legislative Affairs Office from 1990 to 1992.

From 1998 to 2000, Baker served as director of congressional affairs for CTIA, at which she helped designate 9-1-1 as the national emergency number and fought against cell phone "cloning". She then served as senior counsel at Covad Communications from 2000 to 2002, taking time off to assist George W. Bush's campaign with the 2000 United States presidential election recount in Florida. She later served as vice president at Williams Mullen from 2002 to 2004, where she focused on intellectual property, international trade, and telecommunications.

=== United States Department of Commerce ===
In January 2004, Baker joined the National Telecommunications and Information Administration (NTIA), which is an agency of the United States Department of Commerce, as a senior advisor. She was subsequently named a deputy assistant secretary of the Department of Commerce by President George W. Bush in February 2007, and then assistant secretary and acting head of NTIA after John Kneuer left the agency in November 2008. She also served as the Office of International Affairs' acting associate administrator and was detailed to the White House Office of Science and Technology Policy.

During her tenure at NTIA, Baker "advised and represented the Executive Branch on both domestic and international telecommunications and information policy activities". According to her FCC biography, Baker's mission at NTIA was to "promote market-based policies that encourage innovation and benefit consumers" as she encouraged efficient radio spectrum use by the federal government and headed the management of the Internet's domain name and numbering system. Baker argued the "government would do best to tread lightly" in broadcast regulations given the "robust and diverse media marketplace". In 2008, Baker voiced concern over the FCC's ruling that Comcast violated policy by "blocking and degrading" file-sharing applications. She also oversaw the $1.5 billion coupon program to help consumers with the nation's digital television transition.

=== Federal Communications Commission ===
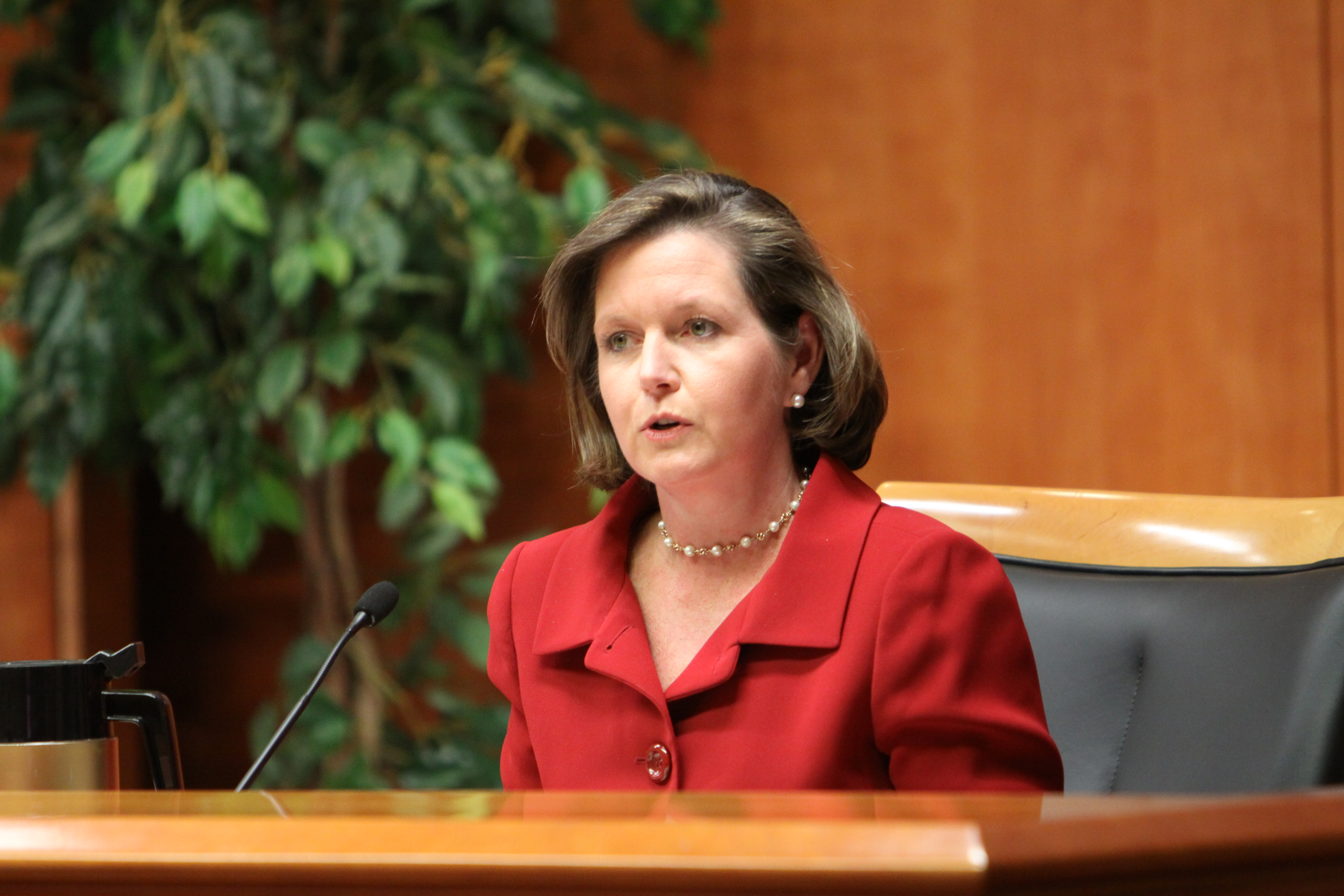
Commissioner Baker in 2010

Baker was nominated by President Obama as a member of the FCC on June 25, 2009. She was sworn in on July 31, 2009, and held the role until June 3, 2011. Like all of President Obama's political appointees, she signed an ethics pledge preventing her from lobbying anyone working at the FCC for two years after she left the independent agency, or any FCC appointees for the rest of Obama's presidency. Baker was one of two Republicans on the five-person commission.

During her tenure, Baker supported efforts to increase radio spectrum availability for wireless broadband services. She also advocated for smart antenna technology and a spectrum database to maximize radio wave use. Baker reportedly voted "with some reservations" to start creating new net neutrality guidelines only after voicing her concerns to Julius Genachowski. She disagreed with his inclusion of wireless service providers within net neutrality policies.

=== NBC Universal ===
In May 2011, Baker accepted a job as senior vice president of governmental affairs for NBC Universal. The move, which came four months after the FCC approved the merger of Comcast and NBC Universal, received some criticism from groups who opposed the merger and voiced concerns about the revolving door between legislative and regulatory agencies and private sector companies. The company said that it did not approach Baker about the position until mid April, after NBC Universal lobbyist Bob Okum resigned. Similarly, Baker said she had no contact with NBC Universal or Comcast about the position when the acquisition was pending. Both Baker and Comcast said the FCC's general counsel, Austin Schlick, was made aware of the potential transition on April 18, and Baker recused herself from merger discussions. Comcast also noted that Kyle E. McSlarrow, who hired Baker at NBC Universal, was not employed by the company when the merger was completed; he was serving at the National Cable and Telecommunications Association (NCTA) at the time.

While Baker could immediately lobby Congress and supervise employees who directly lobby the FCC, to comply with Obama's ethics pledge, she could not personally lobby any executive branch political appointee (including the FCC) during Obama's presidency. However, after two years, she could lobby non-political appointees at the FCC. Additionally, she may never personally lobby anyone on the Comcast/NBC merger agreement.

=== CTIA ===
Baker became CTIA's president and CEO in mid 2014, having previously served as the advocacy group's director of congressional affairs from 1998 to 2000. In a statement released after her hiring, Baker identified three spectrum priorities for the association: "place more emphasis on technical and engineering expertise related to spectrum and wireless technologies; work with commercial and government users to produce a viable five-year plan for the future of spectrum usage; and begin to regularly assess how efficiently spectrum is being used."

In January 2015, Baker testified on the importance of an open Internet but against the reclassification of mobile broadband as a Title II service under the Communications Act of 1934 at a hearing held by the House Energy Subcommittee on Communications and Technology. Two months later, CTIA, NCTA, and USTelecom, filed legal challenges against the FCC's net neutrality order reclassifying broadband under Title II.

Baker has testified before Congress on the issue of spectrum. In a March 2016 media call, she said the industry is ready to invest billions of dollars to fund spectrum and new infrastructure, suggesting the "spectrum pipeline should become a national priority" because "100 MHz of spectrum is equal to $30 billion to the economy and 1 million jobs." In 2016, CTIA released reports outlining the importance of U.S. leadership in 5G and high band spectrum. The organization praised the FCC's unanimous vote in July 2016 to allow wireless operations above 24 GHz.

In 2017, CTIA released a report authored by Accenture on the economic benefits of 5G deployment, with Baker noting, "Accenture's report confirms the significant benefits from the next generation of wireless, driven by hundreds of billions of dollars that the wireless industry will invest to deploy 5G." In 2023, Baker was recognized by the Wireless Hall of Fame for her dedication to the cellular industry

== Personal life ==
Baker and her husband James A. "Jamie" Baker, IV, a retired senior partner at the law firm Baker Botts, married in Ravello, Italy, in 2006. James is the son of attorney and statesman James Baker, III, who served as White House Chief of Staff and United States Secretary of the Treasury under President Ronald Reagan, and as United States Secretary of State and White House Chief of Staff under President George H. W. Bush.

The couple resides in McLean, Virginia. Baker has three stepdaughters by her husband's previous marriage, including comedian Rosebud Baker.

== Works ==
- "Building our mobile life". The Hill. August 26, 2014.
- "5G Networks: The Next Generation of Wireless". Wireless Week. October 20, 2015.
- "Incentive auction will transform spectrum policy". The Hill. December 8, 2015.
- "How to make America great? Invest in our smartphone networks". The Hill. February 2, 2017.
