= AT&T Corp. v. City of Portland =

2000 United States appeals court case

- Court: United States Court of Appeals for the Ninth Circuit
- Argued: November 1, 1999
- Decided: June 22, 2000
- Citation: 216 F.3d 871

Holding
- Federal Communications Commission regulations on cable broadband Internet access supersede local regulations, because the Commission has nationwide authority over the provision of telecommunications networks.

Court membership
- Judges sitting: Sidney R. Thomas, Edward Leavy, Ferdinand Fernandez

Case opinions
- Majority: Sidney R. Thomas

Laws applied
- First Amendment to the United States Constitution, Commerce Clause, Contract Clause, Telecommunications Act of 1996

AT&T Corp. v. City of Portland, 216 F.3d 871 (9th Cir., 2000), was a ruling at the United States Court of Appeals for the Ninth Circuit. The ruling was an important early precedent on the regulation of local cable broadband networks, with the court finding that Federal Communications Commission regulations supersede those of local authorities.The ruling has also been cited as a precedent in network neutrality disputes.

== Background ==
In the late 1990s, TCI was the monopoly provider of cable broadband Internet service in Portland, Oregon and the surrounding Multnomah County. In 1998, TCI merged with AT&T, and that company's "@Home" service would become the only cable broadband option for the area's residents. AT&T would then exercise control of the physical network infrastructure. Later that year, the city and county initially approved the transfer of the area's cable franchise agreement to AT&T, with the stipulation that the company provide open access to its physical network. This would require non-discriminatory access by potential competitors to the physical network, so they could provide Internet service without building their own physical infrastructures.

AT&T rejected the open access provision, after which the city and county denied transfer of the cable franchise. The company filed suit in the United States District Court for the District of Oregon, arguing that the city and county had overstepped their authority by adding extra conditions to the franchise agreement.

== District court proceedings ==
At the Oregon district court, AT&T claimed that the Portland/Multnomah County ordinance violated the Commerce Clause of the U.S. Constitution because it burdened interstate commerce, and the Contract Clause of the Constitution which prohibited state intervention in contracts. AT&T also claimed that the ordinance violated the First Amendment right to free speech because it would require the company to carry network content of which it may not approve.

The district court rejected all of AT&T's arguments, ruling that the Commerce Clause was not relevant for a service that was only available in the Portland area (it did not cross state lines); the Contract Clause had not been violated because it was common practice for local governments to grant cable franchises, and conditions could be added if they did not significantly impact the contractual relationship. Meanwhile, the First Amendment did not apply because the ordinance was a strictly economic regulation.

AT&T appealed this ruling to the United States Court of Appeals for the Ninth Circuit.

== Circuit court ruling ==
At the Ninth Circuit, AT&T added a new argument that local cable regulations should not supersede the nationwide regulations enforced by the Federal Communications Commission (FCC), as required per the Telecommunications Act of 1996. The circuit court acknowledged the challenges of monopoly control of local telecommunications networks, particularly after a then-recent rush of corporate mergers like that between AT&T and TCI. The court stated that "Distilled to its essence, this [case] is a struggle for control over access to cable broadband technology."

The circuit court noted that Portland and Multnomah County had fashioned the open access ordinance upon the idea that AT&T @Home was a cable television service, and local governments have authority over franchise agreements to serve local residents. The court ruled that, given its additional two-way Internet capabilities, the service was not cable TV as defined by Congress in a 1960s-era addition to the Communications Act of 1934. Therefore, the court looked to the updated Telecommunications Act of 1996 and found that it included provisions directing the FCC to foster competition in the telecommunications marketplace via non-discrimination and interconnection regulations. While the FCC had not yet enacted any such regulations at the time of the present case, the court found that the commission had federal authority over the operations of local broadband networks, and its authority superseded that of local regulatory commissions.

Thus, the circuit court reversed the district court decision and held that Portland/Multnomah County could not extend their authority over the local cable TV franchise to the related but technologically separate matter of the local cable broadband network. In practical terms, the FCC would be able to issue a decision on local cable broadband competition similar to that already attempted by the city and county in this particular dispute, which later became common practice.

== Impact ==
AT&T Corp. v. City of Portland is often cited as an important early precedent on local regulations requiring open access on Internet networks, which in turn has also made it a precedent for later cases on network neutrality and whether the Federal Communications Commission has authority over that principle. And while it was not germane to the ultimate circuit court ruling, AT&T's initial arguments at the district court level have been criticized for misusing the spirit of the U.S. Constitution to maintain corporate profits in the telecommunications industry, which had been a growing trend in that sector for several years before this case.
