= CTIA (organization) =

Trade association

Coordinates: 38°54′32.6″N 77°2′13″W

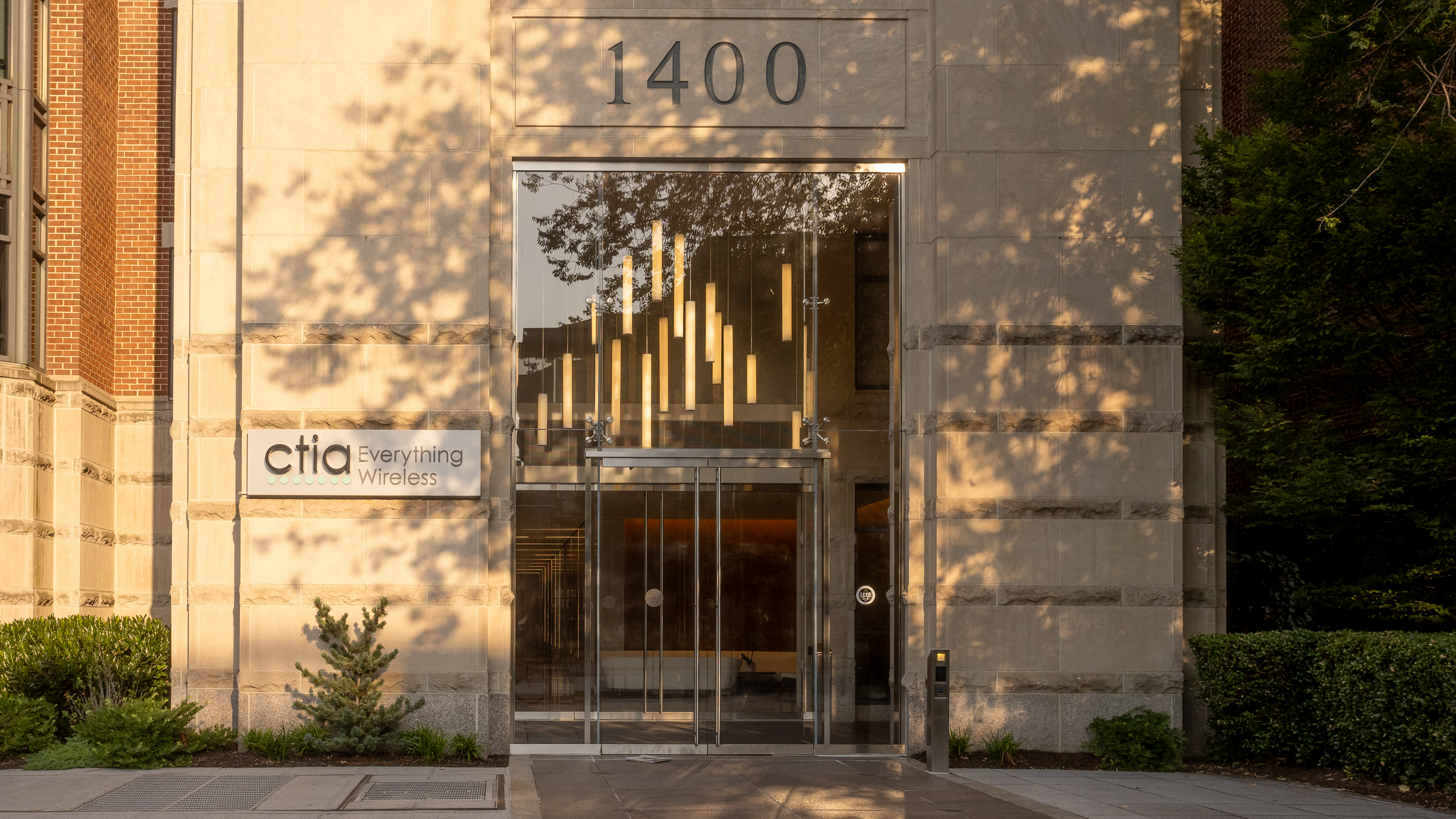
- Headquarters in the Dupont Circle neighborhood
- Established: 1984; 42 years ago
- Headquarters: 1400 16th Street, NW, Suite 600
- Location: Washington, D.C., United States
- Key people: Ajit Pai (President and CEO)
- Website: www.ctia.org

The logo from 2004 through 2015

CTIA is a trade association representing the Wireless communications industry in the United States. The association was established in 1984 and is headquartered in Washington, D.C. It is a 501(c)(6) nonprofit membership organization, and represents wireless carriers and suppliers, and manufacturers and providers of wireless products and services.

CTIA operates certification programs for the wireless industry and publishes wireless industry surveys. It has also sponsored various public service initiatives related to wireless.

It was initially known as the Cellular Telecommunications Industry Association until 2004, and later the Cellular Telecommunications and Internet Association. The organization has since operated under its initialism only, subtitled as CTIA – The Wireless Association until 2015.

== History ==
CTIA was established in May 1984 as the Cellular Telecommunications Industry Association. In 2000, the organization merged with the Wireless Data Forum and became the Cellular Telecommunications and Internet Association. Its name was changed to CTIA—The Wireless Association in 2004.

== Leadership ==
Tom Wheeler was chief executive officer (CEO) of CTIA from 1992 to 2004. He was appointed chairman of the Federal Communications Commission (FCC) by President Barack Obama and confirmed by the United States Senate in November 2013.

Steve Largent was president and CEO fromNovember 2003 to 2014. Meredith Attwell Baker was president and CEO from June 2014 to April 2025. CTIA paid Baker $3.0 million in compensation in 2021, $3.2 million in 2022, $3.7 million in 2023, and $6.1 million in 2024. Ajit Pai became CEO and president in April 2025.

== Issue advocacy ==
=== Spectrum ===
When Baker was named president and CEO, she identified spectrum as a policy priority. She has testified before United States Congress on the issue. In a March 2016 media call, Baker said the industry is ready to invest billions of dollars to fund spectrum and new infrastructure. She suggested the "spectrum pipeline should become a national priority" because "100 MHz of spectrum is equal to $30 billion to the economy and 1 million jobs."

In 2016, CTIA released reports outlining the importance of U.S. leadership in the 5G and high band spectrum. CTIA praised the FCC's unanimous vote in July 2016 to allow wireless operations above 24 GHz.

=== Broadband and net neutrality ===
CTIA supported the FCC retaining "the 2010 open Internet order's 'mobile specific' approach to [regulations] given the 'unique engineering, competitive and legal conditions' of 4G LTE, rather than a one-size-fits both wired and wireless approach" in a letter from Baker to Rep. Greg Walden (R-Ore.), chairman of the House Energy Subcommittee on Communications and Technology, in September 2014.

In January 2015, Baker testified on the importance of an open Internet but against the reclassification of mobile broadband as a Title II (common carrier) service under the Communications Act of 1934 at a hearing held by the House Energy and Commerce Subcommittee on Communications and Technology. Two months later, CTIA, the National Cable and Telecommunications Association (NCTA), and USTelecom, filed legal challenges against the FCC's net neutrality order reclassifying broadband under Title II.

=== Wireless infrastructure ===
CTIA has helped lead efforts to remove regulatory barriers, at all levels of government to the deployment of wireless infrastructure, particularly small cells and distributed antenna systems (DAS).

== Industry trade shows ==
CTIA has organized trade shows for the wireless industry, including the CTIA Wireless Show and MobileCON. In January 2013, it was announced that both events would be replaced by a new event known as CTIA Super Mobility, first held in September 2014. The following year's conference featured 1,000 exhibitors and attracted 30,000 visitors.

In June 2016, CTIA announced a partnership with the GSM Association, under which Super Mobility Week would be re-launched as Mobile World Congress Americas beginning in 2017.

== CTIA Wireless Foundation ==
CTIA's nonprofit organization, CTIA Wireless Foundation, supports initiatives that use wireless technology to assist communities. The foundation partnered with American Red Cross to create the "Text2HELP" program to help aid victims of the 2004 Indian Ocean earthquake and tsunami, Hurricane Katrina, and the 2010 Haiti earthquake. The program enabled wireless customers to send text messages to make donations to American Red Cross' relief efforts.

The foundation is a significant sponsor of PulsePoint, a no-cost app that alerts users of nearby cardiac arrest emergencies so they can offer first aid before first responders arrive. The foundation also supports "text4baby", a no-cost mobile texting program that provides information to parents and caregivers on prenatal care and baby health and parenting.

== See also ==
- Cibernet, spun out of CTIA in 2003
- Mobile Web
- TRRS standards
