= NCTA (association) =

American telecommunications organization

- NCTA – The Internet & Television Association
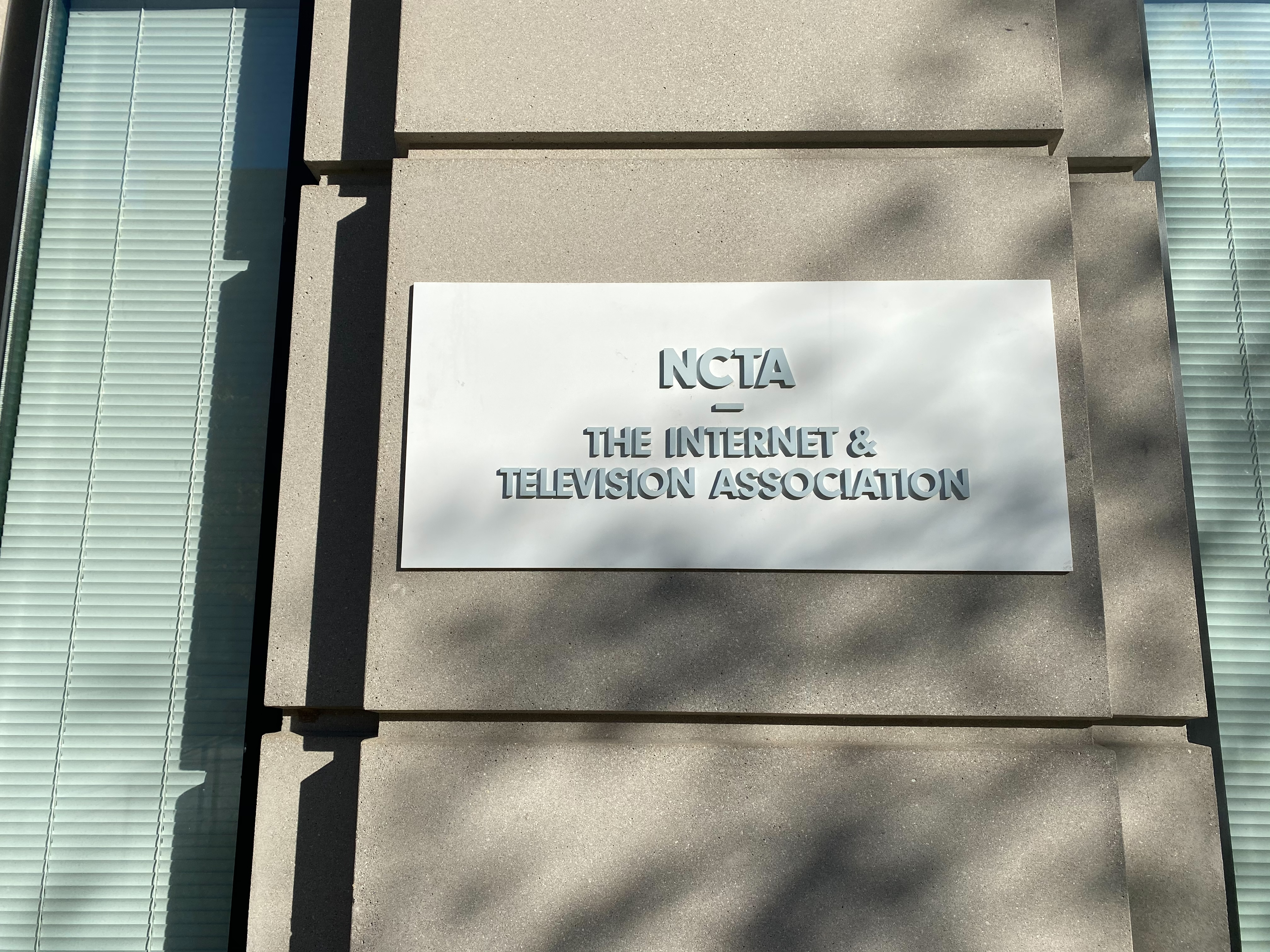
- NCTA sign
- Founded: 1952
- Type: Trade association
- Location: 25 Massachusetts Ave NW Washington, DC 20001
- President and CEO: Cory Gardner
- Website: ncta.com
- Formerly called: National Cable & Telecommunications Association

NCTA – The Internet & Television Association since 2016, formerly known as the National Cable & Telecommunications Association (NCTA), is a trade association representing the broadband and cable television industries in the United States. As of 2011, NCTA represented more than 90% of the U.S. cable market, over 200 cable networks, and various equipment suppliers and service providers to the cable industry.

NCTA is considered one of the most prominent lobbying organizations in the United States, having $14 million to lobbying efforts in 2021. Regarding policy matters, NCTA has expressed opposition to net neutrality and municipal broadband proposals. Currently the association is led by former Colorado Senator and Congressman Cory Gardner, appointed as President & CEO in September 2025. Previously, the association was led by Michael Powell, a former Republican member of the Federal Communications Commission (FCC).

== History ==
NCTA was initially established as the National Community Television Council in September 1951, when a small group of community antenna (CATV) operators convened in Pottsville, Pennsylvania. Their gathering was prompted by concerns over the Internal Revenue Service's proposed 8% excise tax on their operations. In January 1952, the organization officially changed its name to the National Community Television Association.

As the CATV industry rapidly expanded, NCTA experienced parallel growth. Within its first year, nearly 40 CATV systems became members of the organization. By the end of the 1950s, membership had reached the hundreds, and by the end of the 1960s, it had expanded into the thousands. During the 1960s, the industry transitioned from using the term "Community Antenna Television (CATV)" to simply "cable," reflecting the broader range of services offered, including local news, weather information, and pay television channels. In 1968, NCTA underwent its first official name change, becoming the National Cable Television Association while retaining its acronym.

With the advent of global telecommunication satellites, the late 1970s and 1980s witnessed a significant surge in cable content. Entrepreneurs launched networks such as CNN, ESPN, MTV, BET, TBS, USA, Discovery, Lifetime, C-SPAN, and many others. Concurrently, major programming services across the nation joined NCTA, augmenting the organization's representation of cable interests in Washington.

To reflect the growing influence of cable internet and other types of two-way communication in the industry, the organization rebranded as the National Cable and Telecommunications Association in April 2001. Subsequently, on September 19, 2016, the organization changed its trade name to "NCTA – The Internet & Television Association", making "NCTA" an orphaned initialism to remove the reference to cable; NCTA president Michael Powell stated that the former name "underrepresents the breadth of what we are and what we do". The organization had already taken steps to reduce its emphasis on cable by rebranding its annual convention from "The Cable Show" to "INTX: The Internet and Television Expo" in 2015.

== Leadership ==
NCTA operates under the guidance of a board of directors. In March 2012, the chairman of the board was Patrick Esser, serving as the president of Cox Communications.

Cory Gardner currently holds the position of president and CEO of NCTA. Gardner was appointed to this role in September 2025. Previously this role was held by Michael Powell who assumed the role on April 25, 2011, succeeding Kyle McSlarrow, who departed to join Comcast. Powell previously served as the head of the FCC.

Past Presidents of NCTA
Term	Name
-1975	David Foster
1975-1979	Robert Schmidt
1979-1984	Tom Wheeler
1984-1993	James Mooney
1994-1999	Decker Anstrom
1999-2005	Robert Sachs
2005-2011	Kyle E. McSlarrow
2011–present	Michael Powell

== Political and legislative activity ==
NCTA is recognized as one of the most prominent lobbying organizations in the United States. In 2014, it allocated approximately $12.0 million for political lobbying.

NCTA expressed opposition to the FCC's proposal to expand the definition of multichannel video programming distributors (MVPDs) to include internet-based services. However, it stated that if the definition were expanded, internet delivery should be subject to the same obligations as traditional cable services. NCTA President Michael Powell holds a stance against amending the Telecommunications Act of 1996 to enable a la carte pay television, citing potential impacts on smaller niche networks.

In March 2014, NCTA voiced support for the FCC's decision to allocate 100 MHz of spectrum for unlicensed Wi-Fi services.

In October 2024, NCTA, along with the Interactive Advertising Bureau and the Electronic Security Association, sued to block the US Federal Trade Commission (FTC) from implementing its so-called "click to cancel" rule, a set of revisions to the FTC's Negative Option Rule that would require businesses to make the cancellation process for subscriptions, renewals, and free trials that convert to paid memberships as easy as the signup process as well as to obtain proof of consent before billing customers for such services.

=== Internet issues ===
NCTA has expressed its views on net neutrality, specifically objecting to the classification of internet service as a common carrier under Title II of the 1996 Telecommunications Act. In 2010, NCTA advised the FCC against formalizing its net neutrality rules. After the rules were invalidated by the court in 2014, NCTA ran advertisements in the media opposing reclassification as a common carrier. According to ProPublica in 2014, NCTA was privately associated with the "Onward Internet" campaign, which advocates for internet free from regulations. In 2016, NCTA and the American Cable Association submitted petitions for en banc review of a ruling that upheld net neutrality rules, arguing against regulating cable internet systems in the same manner as "archaic telephone systems".

NCTA supported the Stop Online Piracy Act of 2011, stating that it provided copyright owners with reasonable tools to protect their intellectual property. NCTA objected to the FCC's decision to raise the minimum internet speed for Connect America Fund broadband subsidies from 4 Mbit/s to 10 Mbit/s, asserting that 4 Mbit/s was sufficient.

Using a model bill developed by the American Legislative Exchange Council (ALEC), NCTA has advocated for legislation that prohibits or restricts municipal broadband in several states. When President Barack Obama requested the FCC preempt these laws in January 2015, NCTA defended the legislation, contending that municipal projects often incur high costs and prove unsuccessful.

NCTA President Michael Powell has advocated for internet service providers to expand their usage of data caps on internet usage, with the aim of promoting fairness rather than alleviating network congestion.

== Events and subsidiaries ==
=== INTX ===
NCTA organizes an annual conference called INTX: The Internet and Television Expo (formerly The Cable Show until 2015). It was the largest trade show in the United States for the cable and broadband industry. The conference featured discussions with current and former FCC commissioners, including remarks from the FCC chair in multiple years.

During INTX, NCTA presented the Vanguard Awards, which were nominated by NCTA members and selected by a committee consisting of members from the NCTA Board of Directors and previous award recipients.

In September 2016, NCTA announced the discontinuation of INTX. Powell described the trade shows as outdated and highlighted the importance of contemporary venues that foster conversation, dialogue, and more intimate interactions with technology. Attendance had been declining due to industry consolidation, making the trade show less necessary.

=== CableACE Awards ===
From 1978 to 1997, NCTA supported the CableACE Award, which aimed to recognize excellence in American cable television programming. The CableACE Award served as a counterpart to the Emmy Awards, which did not previously acknowledge cable programming. However, after 1997, the Emmys began to include cable television programming, leading to the discontinuation of the CableACE Awards.

=== Cable in the Classroom ===
The association also oversees Cable in the Classroom, which is the education foundation of the cable industry.

=== Walter Kaitz Foundation ===
NCTA is responsible for managing and overseeing the Walter Kaitz Foundation, which aims to promote diversity in the cable industry's workforce, supplier chain, content, and marketing.

=== Industry Positioning ===
NCTA provides CTAM (formerly the Cable and Telecommunications Association for Marketing) with financial support and strategic oversight. Together, they guide the sector's consumer-facing marketing and corporate communications. Through recurring grants, NCTA funds CTAM's Industry Positioning Initiative to strengthen the collective messaging of broadband providers across the country.

== See also ==
- CTIA – The Wireless Association
- National Cable & Telecommunications Ass'n v. Brand X Internet Services
