= Verizon Communications Inc. v. FCC (2014) =

Verizon v. FCC
- Court: United States Court of Appeals for the District of Columbia Circuit
- Full case name: Verizon Communications Inc. v. Federal Communications Commission
- Argued: September 9, 2013
- Decided: January 14, 2014
- Citations: 740 F.3d 623 (D.C. Cir. 2014); 11-1355 (2014)

Holding
- The FCC does not have the authority to regulate broadband providers as per the FCC's own Open Internet Order. The court vacated in part and upheld in part the FCC Open Internet Order 2010.

Court membership
- Judges sitting: Senior Circuit Judge Laurence H. Silberman; Circuit Judges Judith Ann Wilson Rogers, David S. Tatel

Case opinions
- Majority: David S. Tatel, joined by Judith Ann Wilson Rogers
- Concur/dissent: Laurence H. Silberman

Verizon Communications Inc. v. Federal Communications Commission, 740 F.3d 623 (D.C. Cir., 2014), was a ruling by the U.S. Court of Appeals for the D.C. Circuit vacating portions of the FCC Open Internet Order of 2010, which the court determined could only be applied to common carriers and not to Internet service providers. The case was initiated by Verizon, which would have been subjected to the proposed FCC rules, though they had not yet gone into effect. The case has been regarded as an important precedent on whether the FCC can regulate network neutrality.

== Background ==
Back in 2007, the Federal Communications Commission (FCC) censured Comcast for violating the Commission's network neutrality principles when it interfered with its users' access to peer-to-peer networking applications. This resulted in the court challenge Comcast Corp. v. FCC in 2010, in which the U.S. Court of Appeals for the District of Columbia held that the FCC did not have ancillary jurisdiction over the content delivery choices of Internet service providers under the language of the Communications Act of 1934.

In the Comcast ruling, the Circuit Court hinted that it would accept separate jurisdictional arguments under other provisions of the 1934 Communications Act or the 1996 Telecommunications Act. This prompted the FCC to establish new rules regarding non-discriminatory delivery of Internet content in late 2010. Because of the ruling in the Comcast case, those new rules were presented in reference to other provisions of the statutes, mostly Section 706 of the 1996 Act, as well as other types of ancillary authority via Titles II and VI of that Act. The updated rules were released in December as the FCC Open Internet Order of 2010. These rules would forbid cable broadband and DSL Internet service providers from blocking or slowing online services or applications. It would also prohibit mobile carriers from blocking VoIP applications such as Skype or blocking websites in their entirely, though those mobile restrictions were fewer than those imposed on cable and DSL.

The industry was unhappy with those new rules as well, with Verizon taking the lead in another court challenge just one month later. Verizon requested judicial review of the 2010 Open Internet Order, again at the Circuit Court for the District of Columbia, with a charge that the FCC had again surpassed its regulatory authority.

== Circuit court ruling ==
The matter of FCC jurisdiction over the content delivery choices of Internet service providers rests on the classification process outlined in the Communications Act of 1934. The Commission determines if a company or product within its jurisdiction qualifies as a "telecommunications service" that must follow common carrier rules under Title II of the Act, most notably a requirement to never discriminate against particular content or users; or as an "information service" that must follow much more lenient rules under Title I of the Act. (There are other classifications that are not relevant for the network neutrality dispute.) The court noted that the FCC had already classified cable broadband Internet, and later Wireless Internet, as "information services" per this process as far back as 2002.

As noted by the court, its task was "not to assess the wisdom of the Open Internet Order regulations, but rather to determine whether the Commission has demonstrated that the regulations fall within the scope of its statutory grant of authority." The court then deconstructed the FCC Open Internet Order of 2010 into its constituent parts. The court vacated two parts of the order, determining that the FCC did not have the authority to impose network neutrality restrictions without classifying network providers as telecommunications service akin to common carriers. Since the Commission had previously classified broadband providers as "information services" and not as "telecommunications services," such companies could not be ordered to avoid discrimination against certain websites or applications under Title II of the Communications Act of 1934.

A different part of the order, in which the FCC ordered all Internet service providers to provide transparent information on their network blocking policies, was upheld by the court because it was not contingent upon operators being classified as common carriers. Additionally, the court found that Section 706 of the Telecommunications Act of 1996 "vests the FCC with affirmative authority to enact measures encouraging the deployment of broadband infrastructure." The court also agreed with the FCC that broadband providers represent a threat to Internet openness and could hinder future development without rules similar to those in the Open Internet Order. Thus, the court hinted that the FCC could require Internet service providers to exercise network neutrality by reclassifying them as "telecommunications services" that were in turn required to act as common carriers.

As a result of this ruling, most of the FCC Open Internet Order of 2010 was invalidated and vacated as a violation of the Commission's authority under the 1934 and 1996 Acts. The exception was the transparency provision.

=== Concurring/dissenting opinion ===
Judge Laurence H. Silberman wrote his own opinion, concurring in part and dissenting in part. Silberman was in general agreement with the majority that the FCC Open Internet Order of 2010 "impermissibly subjects broadband providers to treatment as common carriers." Of significance is Silberman's statement that the FCC has the authority to take "measures that promote competition in the local telecommunications market or other regulating methods that remove barriers to infrastructure investment." This has been interpreted to mean that the FCC has the authority to challenge state laws restricting municipal broadband, which became controversial in the following years.

== Reactions ==
=== Industry developments ===
Immediately following the decision, several major telecommunications firms issued statements agreeing with the ruling. For example, Verizon stated the ruling will result in more innovation and more choice for consumers. AT&T stated that their commitment to network neutrality will not diminish. Time Warner Cable stated that their commitment to deliver the best service will not be compromised. As part of the Comcast/NBC merger, Comcast was required to follow the FCC Open Internet Order of 2010 for seven years. The company reiterated this commitment after the trial.

Shortly after the ruling, Netflix updated its ISP speed rankings with data showing that average access speed via Verizon FiOS traffic had dropped between December 2013 and January 2014, just before the ruling. Ars Technica found this to be suspicious. Pointing to Netflix's performance change, several news outlets pointed out that the battle over non-discriminatory Internet access began to shift from network neutrality frameworks to private peering deals between service providers, which had not been covered by the FCC Open Internet Order of 2010.

=== Academic and news commentary ===
Multiple news outlets claimed that the Verizon ruling was the death of network neutrality in the United States. Since the court upheld the FCC's authority to regulate broadband providers to encourage nationwide broadband deployment, agreeing with the Commission's interpretation of Section 706 of the 1996 Telecommunications Act, some legal observers believed this should allow the FCC to reclassify broadband providers as "telecommunications services" and therefore subject them to common carrier regulations. Legal scholar Annemarie Bridy predicted that the case would force the FCC's hand in reclassifying broadband providers as "telecommunications services," something which the FCC had thus far resisted doing. Legal scholar Susan P. Crawford wrote that the FCC should move to regulate broadband providers as common carriers in order to preserve network neutrality in the United States.

In response to the FCC's decision to not appeal the Verizon ruling but to establish new rules, James P. Tuthill, an attorney and lecturer at UC Berkeley School of Law, criticized the decision as the agency could have appealed to the Supreme Court, and that court would likely accept the case because of the significance of the issues and per a direct request by a federal agency. He also predicted that even if the FCC proposed new rules, they would be challenged by the industry and overturned based on the unappealed Verizon precedent, so "simply calling a rose by another name will not change what it is, and the courts won't buy it."

Other commentators had mixed reactions to the ruling. April Glaser, a staff activist at the Electronic Frontier Foundation, noted that the ruling could significantly restrict the FCC's potential approaches toward network neutrality regulation. Conversely, others believed that the ruling gave the FCC too much power, to the point at which it could restrict innovative network management strategies by ISPs that might be requested by users.

=== Public and government reactions ===
In January 2014, in response to the ruling, a campaign was launched on the White House's petition site, urging President Barack Obama to direct the FCC to reclassify ISPs as telecommunications services with common carrier requirements. The petition received more than 105,000 signatures. The Obama administration replied to the petition, stating that although the President "vigorously supports" a robust, free, and open Internet, he was not able to direct the FCC to do anything because the FCC is an independent agency.

In February 2014, Tom Wheeler, then chairman of the FCC, issued a statement responding to the court's decision and laying out the Commission's intentions for the future of network neutrality. Wheeler stated that the Commission would not appeal the Verizon ruling, but would take the court's advice on reclassification of Internet service providers in the interests of non-discriminatory content delivery. The FCC then opened a new proceeding asking for public comment, and Wheeler announced in April that he would circulate a draft network neutrality-oriented Notice of Proposed Rulemaking on the matter.

In 2015, the FCC reclassified Internet service providers as "telecommunications services" under the Communications Act of 1934, as had been suggested by the judges in the Verizon ruling. This led to yet another Circuit court challenge from the industry, United States Telecom Association v. FCC, in 2016.
