= Comcast Corp. v. FCC =

2010 US Court of Appeals for the District of Columbia case

- Court: United States Court of Appeals for the District of Columbia Circuit
- Full case name: Comcast Corporation v. Federal Communications Commission and United States of America
- Argued: January 8 2010
- Decided: April 6 2010
- Citation: 600 F. 3d 642

Holding
- The FCC does not have ancillary jurisdiction over Comcast's Internet service under the language of the Communications Act of 1934.

Court membership
- Judges sitting: Chief Judge David B. Sentelle; Circuit Judges Arthur Raymond Randolph and David S. Tatel

Case opinions
- Majority: Judge Tatel, joined by Chief Judge Sentelle and Judge Randolph

Comcast Corp. v. FCC, 600 F.3d 642 (D.C. Cir., 2010), was a ruling by the United States Court of Appeals for the District of Columbia holding that the Federal Communications Commission (FCC) does not have ancillary jurisdiction over the content delivery choices of Internet service providers, under the language of the Communications Act of 1934. In so holding, the Court vacated a 2008 order issued by the FCC that asserted jurisdiction over network management policies and censured Comcast from interfering with its subscribers' use of peer-to-peer software. The case has been regarded as an important precedent on whether the FCC can regulate network neutrality.

== Background ==
In 2007, several subscribers of Comcast's high-speed Internet service discovered that Comcast was interfering with their use of peer-to-peer networking applications, particularly BitTorrent. On behalf of users, the non-profit advocacy organizations Free Press and Public Knowledge filed a complaint with the FCC and claimed that such actions by an ISP ignored traditional network neutrality principles. The complaint stated that Comcast's actions violated the FCC Internet Policy Statement of 2008, particularly the statement's principle that "consumers are entitled to access the lawful Internet content of their choice... [and] to run applications and use services of their choice". Comcast defended its interference with consumers' peer-to-peer programs as necessary to manage scarce network capacity.

Following the complaint, the FCC issued an order prohibiting Comcast from interfering with subscribers' use of peer-to-peer software. This was the FCC's second attempt to enforce its network neutrality policy. The order began with the FCC stating that it had jurisdiction over Comcast's network management practices under the Communications Act of 1934, which granted the FCC the power to "perform any and all acts, make such rules and regulations, and issue such orders, not inconsistent with [the Act], as may be necessary in the execution of its functions". This general high-level authority is known as ancillary jurisdiction. Next, the FCC ruled that Comcast impeded consumers' ability to access content and use applications of their choice. Additionally, because other options were available for Comcast to manage its network capacity without discriminating against peer-to-peer programs, the FCC found that this method of bandwidth management violated federal policy.

Comcast initially complied with the order, but requested judicial review of the FCC's 2008 policy statement at the United States Court of Appeals for the District of Columbia.

== Circuit court ruling ==
The Circuit Court held that the FCC failed to argue convincingly that its sanction against Comcast, which in turn was a regulation of the content delivery choices of an Internet service provider, could be justified as part of the ancillary jurisdiction allowed under the 1934 Communications Act. The Court relied on a two-part test for ancillary authority, laid out in the precedent American Library Association v. FCC: The FCC may exercise ancillary authority only if "(1) the Commission's general jurisdictional granted under Title I [of the Communications Act] covers the regulated subject and (2) the regulations are reasonably ancillary to the Commission's effective performance of its statutorily mandated responsibilities."

Although Comcast conceded that the FCC satisfied the first prong of that test, the court ruled that the FCC failed to satisfy the second prong. The FCC could not show that its action of barring Comcast from interfering with its customers' use of particular web services was reasonably ancillary to the effective performance of its statutorily-mandated authority. Instead, the FCC relied on a Congressional statement of policy and various provisions of the Communications Act, neither of which the Court found created "statutorily mandated responsibilities." Additionally, the court noted that if it accepted the FCC's argument, it would "virtually free the Commission from its congressional tether," thereby providing the Commission unbounded authority to impose regulations on Internet service providers.

== Impact and subsequent events ==
After the ruling by the Circuit Court, Comcast stated that "We are gratified by the Court's decision today to vacate the previous FCC's order. [...] Comcast remains committed to the FCC's existing open Internet principles, and we will continue to work constructively with this FCC as it determines how best to increase broadband adoption and preserve an open and vibrant Internet." Conversely, in the Commission's view "Today's court decision invalidated the prior Commission's approach to preserving an open Internet. But the Court in no way disagreed with the importance of preserving a free and open Internet; nor did it close the door to other methods for achieving this important end."

While the Circuit Court found that the FCC lacked the power to enforce these network neutrality rules as a matter of ancillary jurisdiction, it hinted that it would accept separate jurisdictional arguments under other provisions of the 1934 Communications Act or the 1996 Telecommunications Act. This prompted the FCC to establish new rules regarding internet regulations in 2010. Because of the ruling in this case, those new rules were presented in reference to other provisions of the statutes, mostly Section 706 of the 1996 Act, as well as other types of ancillary authority via Titles II and VI of the Act. The updated rules were released in December 2010 as the FCC Open Internet Order of 2010. This order would forbid cable broadband and DSL Internet service providers from blocking or slowing online applications. It would also prohibit mobile carriers from blocking VoIP applications such as Skype or blocking websites in their entirely. These mobile restrictions were more lenient than those imposed on cable and DSL.

The industry was unhappy with those new rules as well, with Verizon taking the lead in another court challenge just one month later. This led to the Circuit Court case Verizon Communications Inc. v. FCC in 2014, with a charge that the FCC had again surpassed its regulatory authority.

== See also ==
- Susan Crawford, Comcast v. FCC - "Ancillary Jurisdiction" Has to Be Ancillary to Something (2010)
- William McQuillen and Todd Shields, "Comcast Wins in Case on FCC Net Neutrality Powers" (2010).
- Fred von Lohmann, "Court Rejects FCC Authority Over the Internet" (2010).
- Abigail Phillips, "FCC "Ancillary" Authority to Regulate the Internet? Don't Count on It" (2011).
