= Tom Wheeler =

American businessman and politician (born 1946)

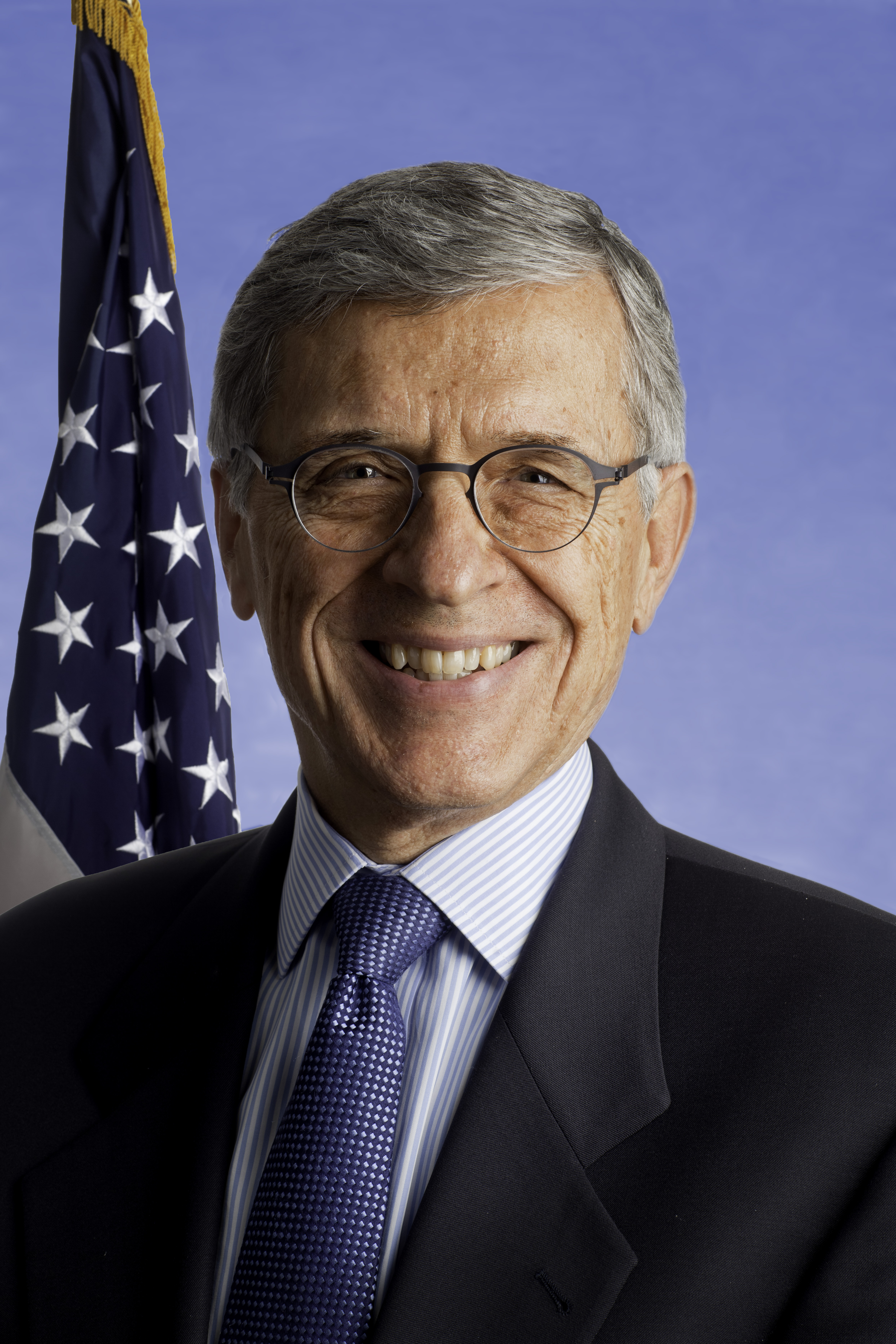

Chairman of the Federal Communications Commission
- In office November 4, 2013 – January 20, 2017
- President: Barack Obama
- Preceded by: Julius Genachowski
- Succeeded by: Ajit Pai

Personal details
- Born: Thomas Edgar Wheeler; April 5, 1946 (age 80) Redlands, California, U.S.
- Party: Democratic
- Education: Ohio State University (BA)

Thomas Edgar Wheeler (born April 5, 1946) is an American businessman and former government official. A member of the Democratic Party, he served as the 31st Chairman of the Federal Communications Commission.

He was appointed by President Barack Obama and confirmed by the U.S. Senate in November 2013. Prior to working at the FCC, Wheeler worked as a venture capitalist and lobbyist for the cable and wireless industry, whom the FCC is now responsible for regulating, and holding positions including President of the National Cable & Telecommunications Association (NCTA) and CEO of the Cellular Telecommunications & Internet Association (CTIA). As was customary for the FCC chairman, Wheeler resigned his seat when the new administration of Donald Trump began on January 20, 2017, and was succeeded by Ajit Pai.

== Career ==
Wheeler was born on April 5, 1946, in Redlands, California. He attended The Ohio State University. From 1969 to 1976, Wheeler led the trade group Grocery Manufacturers of America. He then went on to work at the National Cable & Telecommunications Association from 1976 to 1984, becoming president of the trade group in 1979. For a year until its closure, Wheeler was president of NABU Network, before spending a number of years creating or running several different technology startups. In 1992, he became the CEO of the Cellular Telecommunications & Internet Association, a post he held until 2004. From 2005 Wheeler was a technology entrepreneur and executive at Core Capital Partners.

Originally considered a frontrunner for the position, Wheeler was confirmed as the new Federal Communications Commission chief in November 2013 following a confirmation hearing before the United States Senate Committee on Commerce, Science, and Transportation. Despite a letter written by several prominent former Obama administration officials endorsing Wheeler for the position, many people expressed concern over the consideration of Wheeler for the position due to his history of lobbying for industry.

In recognition of his work in promoting the wireless industry, Wheeler was inducted into the Wireless Hall of Fame in 2003 and in 2009, as a result of his work in promoting the growth and prosperity of the cable television industry and its stakeholders, was inducted into the Cable Television Hall of Fame. He is one of only two individuals to be in both the Cable Hall of Fame and the Wireless Hall of Fame. Cablevision magazine named Wheeler one of the 20 most influential individuals in its history during cable's 20th anniversary in 1995.

During Barack Obama's 2008 presidential campaign, Wheeler spent six weeks in Iowa aiding his campaign efforts and went on to raise over US$500,000 for Obama's campaigns.

In October 2022, Wheeler joined the Council for Responsible Social Media project launched by Issue One to address the negative mental, civic, and public health impacts of social media in the United States co-chaired by former House Democratic Caucus Leader Dick Gephardt and former Massachusetts Lieutenant Governor Kerry Healey.

== Net neutrality ==
In late April 2014, the contours of a document leaked that indicated that the FCC under Wheeler would consider announcing rules that would violate net neutrality principles by making it easier for companies to pay ISPs (including cable companies and wireless ISPs) to provide faster "lanes" for delivering their content to Internet users. These plans received substantial backlash from activists, the mainstream press, and some other FCC commissioners. In May 2014, over 100 Internet companies—including Google, Microsoft, eBay, and Facebook—signed a letter to Wheeler voicing their disagreement with his plans, saying they represented a "grave threat to the Internet". As of May 15, 2014, the "Internet fast lane" rules passed with a 3–2 vote. They were then open to public discussion that ended July 2014.

In November 2014, President Obama gave a speech endorsing the classification of ISPs as utilities under Title II of the Communications Act of 1934. Wheeler stated in January 2015 that the FCC was "going to propose rules that say no blocking, no throttling, no paid prioritization" at the Consumer Electronics Show in Las Vegas. On January 31, 2015, the Associated Press reported the FCC will present the notion of applying ("with some caveats") Title II (common carrier) of the Communications Act of 1934 to the Internet in a vote expected on February 26, 2015. Adoption of this notion would reclassify Internet service from one of information to one of telecommunications and, according to Wheeler, ensure US net neutrality. The FCC was expected to enforce net neutrality in its vote, according to the New York Times.

On February 26, 2015, the FCC ruled in favor of net neutrality by applying Title II of the Communications Act of 1934 and Section 706 of the Telecommunications act of 1996 to the Internet. Wheeler commented, "This is no more a plan to regulate the Internet than the First Amendment is a plan to regulate free speech. They both stand for the same concept." On March 12, 2015, the FCC released the specific details of the net neutrality rules. On April 13, 2015, the FCC published the final rule on its new "Net Neutrality" regulations.

Critics said that Wheeler was unduly influenced by Obama in changing his stance on net neutrality. In addition, journalists and advocates have expressed concern regarding the potential for inappropriate involvement by the White House over rule making at the FCC, which is supposed to be an independent agency. During a House Oversight Committee hearing in March 2015, Republicans disclosed that Wheeler had secretly met with top aides at the White House nine times while the new rules were being formulated. Wheeler responded that the new rules had not been discussed during the meetings. This prompted the committee chairman to state, "You meet with the White House multiple times … and we're supposed to believe that one of the most important things the FCC has ever done, that this doesn't come up?"

== Bibliography ==
- Wheeler, Tom, Take Command!: Leadership Lessons from the Civil War. New York: Currency Doubleday, 2000. ISBN 0385495188 OCLC 232697696
- Wheeler, Tom, Mr. Lincoln's T-Mails: The Untold Story of How Abraham Lincoln Used the Telegraph to Win the Civil War. New York: Collins, 2006. ISBN 006112978X OCLC 70046076

Political offices
Preceded by Julius Genachowski	Chairman of the Federal Communications Commission; 2013–2017	Succeeded by Ajit Pai
