= Ajit Pai =

American lawyer (born 1973)

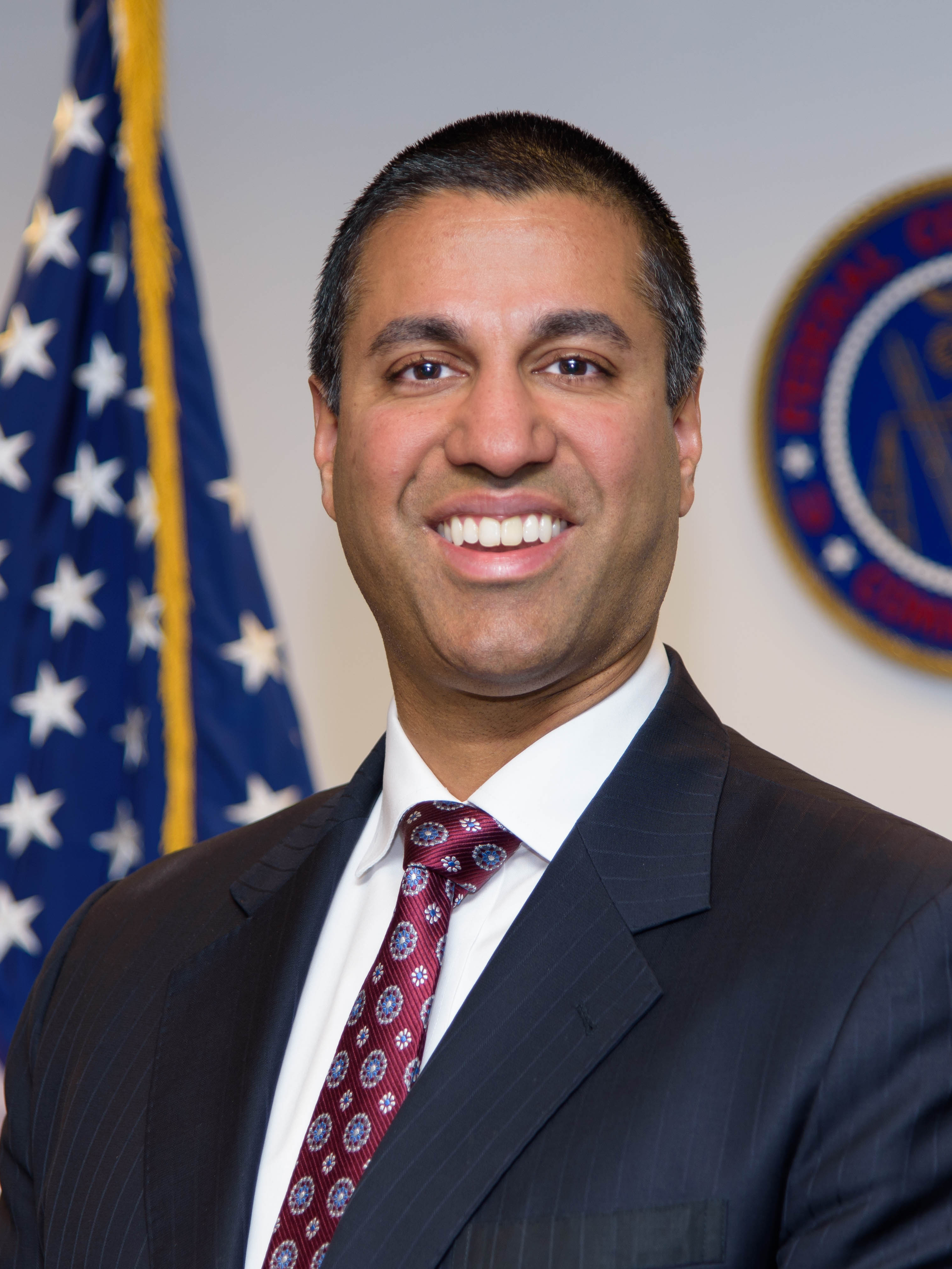
- Official portrait, 2018

Chair of the Federal Communications Commission
- In office January 23, 2017 – January 20, 2021
- President: Donald Trump
- Preceded by: Tom Wheeler
- Succeeded by: Jessica Rosenworcel

Member of the Federal Communications Commission
- In office May 14, 2012 – January 20, 2021
- President: Barack Obama; Donald Trump
- Preceded by: Meredith Attwell Baker
- Succeeded by: Anna M. Gomez

Personal details
- Born: Ajit Varadaraj Pai; January 10, 1973 (age 53) Buffalo, New York, U.S.
- Party: Republican
- Children: 2
- Education: Harvard University (BA); University of Chicago (JD)

Ajit Varadaraj Pai (/əˈdʒiːt ˈpaɪ/; born January 10, 1973) is an American lawyer who served as chairman of the Federal Communications Commission (FCC) from 2017 to 2021. He became a partner at the private-equity firm Searchlight Capital in April 2021. He became the president and chief executive officer (CEO) of CTIA on April 1, 2025.

The son of Konkani Indian immigrants to the United States, Pai grew up in Parsons, Kansas. He is a graduate of both Harvard University and the University of Chicago Law School. He worked as a lawyer in various offices of the U.S. Department of Justice and the U.S. Senate Judiciary Committee, with a two-year stint as an in-house lawyer for Verizon Communications. He joined the FCC as a lawyer in its Office of General Counsel in 2007. He was nominated to be a commissioner in 2011 by President Barack Obama, who followed tradition in preserving balance on the commission by accepting the recommendation of Senate majority leader Mitch McConnell. He was confirmed unanimously by the U.S. Senate on May 7, 2012, and was sworn in on May 14, 2012, for a five-year term.

In January 2017, newly inaugurated president Donald Trump designated Pai as FCC chairman. He is the first Indian American to hold the office. In March 2017, Trump announced that he would renominate Pai to serve another five-year term (remaining Chairman of the FCC). Pai was confirmed by the U.S. Senate for an additional five-year term on October 2, 2017. Pai is a proponent of repealing net neutrality in the United States and, on December 14, 2017, voted with the majority of the FCC to reverse the decision to regulate the internet under Title II of the Communications Act of 1934. Pai resigned on January 20, 2021, the day of Joe Biden's inauguration as President of the United States.

== Early life and education ==
Pai was born on January 10, 1973, in Buffalo, New York. His father, Varadaraj Pai, and his mother, Radha Pai, immigrated to the United States from India in 1971. His father was a urologist and his mother was an anesthesiologist. He is of Konkani descent.

Pai grew up in Parsons, Kansas, where his parents worked at the county hospital. After graduating from Parsons Senior High School in 1990, Pai studied social studies at Harvard University, where he was a member of the Harvard Speech and Parliamentary Debate Society. He graduated from Harvard in 1994 with an B.A. with honors. He then attended the University of Chicago Law School, where he was an editor of the University of Chicago Law Review and won a Mulroy Prize for excellence in evidence law. He graduated with a J.D. in 1997.

== Career ==
After law school, Pai clerked for Judge Martin Leach-Cross Feldman of the U.S. District Court for the Eastern District of Louisiana from 1997 to 1998. Pai then worked for the Antitrust Division of the U.S. Department of Justice as an Honors Program trial attorney on the Telecommunications Task Force. There, he worked on proposed mergers and acquisitions and on novel requests for regulatory relief following the enactment of the Telecommunications Act of 1996.

Pai left his Department of Justice post in February 2001 to serve as Associate General Counsel at Verizon Communications Inc., where he handled competition matters, regulatory issues, and counseling of business units on broadband initiatives. Pai left Verizon in April 2003 and was hired as Deputy Chief Counsel to the United States Senate Judiciary Committee's Subcommittee on Administrative Oversight and the Courts. He returned to the Department of Justice to serve as senior counsel in the Office of Legal Policy in May 2004. He held that position until February 2005, when he was hired as Chief Counsel to the Subcommittee on the Constitution, Civil Rights, and Property Rights.

Between 2007 and 2011, Pai held several positions in the FCC's Office of General Counsel, serving most prominently as Deputy General Counsel. In this role, he had supervisory responsibility over several dozen lawyers in the Administrative Law Division and worked on a wide variety of regulatory and transactional matters involving the Wireless, wireline, cable, Internet, media, and satellite industries. In 2010, Pai was one of 55 individuals nationwide chosen for the 2011 Marshall Memorial Fellowship, a leadership development initiative of the German Marshall Fund of the United States. Pai returned to the private sector in April 2011, working in the Washington, D.C., office of law firm Jenner & Block where he was a partner in the Communications Practice.

In 2011, Pai was then nominated for a Republican Party position on the Federal Communications Commission by President Barack Obama at the recommendation of Minority leader Mitch McConnell. He was confirmed unanimously by the United States Senate on May 7, 2012, and was sworn in on May 14, 2012, for a term that concluded on June 30, 2016. Pai was then designated chairman of the FCC by President Donald Trump in January 2017 for a five-year term. He was confirmed by the U.S. Senate for the additional five-year term on October 2, 2017.

In 2019, he was named forty-seventh among the 100 Most Influential People in Healthcare by Modern Healthcare. He resigned from his post on 20 January 2021, following the inauguration of Joe Biden as President of the United States.

In April 2025, he became president and CEO of wireless industry lobby group CTIA.

== Policy positions ==
Pai was an advocate for less regulation during his tenure on the FCC. He was seen as a closer ally to broadcasters than to other members of the FCC. In testimony before the U.S. House of Representatives Energy and Commerce Committee's Subcommittee on Communications and Technology on July 10, 2012, he warned about the dangers of regulatory uncertainty and the need for the FCC to keep pace with the dynamic communications sector. Pai also asserted that by reforming the way the commission works, the agency can facilitate the provision of new and better services at lower prices for American consumers.

Pai gave his first major speech since taking office at Carnegie Mellon University on July 18, 2012. He discussed how the FCC can help promote economic growth and enhance job creation in the information and communications technology field by adhering to three basic principles: (1) the FCC should be as nimble as the industry it oversees; (2) the FCC should prioritize the removal of regulatory barriers to infrastructure investment; and (3) the FCC should accelerate its efforts to allocate additional spectrum for mobile broadband. Pai called for a reinvigoration of Section 7 of the Communications Act, which gives the commission a one-year deadline to review proposals for new technologies and services. He introduced the idea of creating an IP Transition Task Force to expedite the country's transition to all-IP networks. He urged the commission to settle the nine-year-old contributions reform proceeding for the Universal Service Fund by the end of the year. Finally, he advocated for completing the rules for the AWS-4 spectrum band by September 2012 and conducting the broadcast spectrum incentive auctions by June 30, 2014.

Pai wrote an op-ed for The Wall Street Journal in 2014 criticizing a proposed FCC study of the news-gathering practices of media organizations. In another 2014 letter, Pai criticized Netflix, writing that their Open Connect caching tools effectively secure fast lanes for its traffic.

In October 2014, Pai wrote an op-ed in the Washington Post criticizing a government-funded research project named Truthy at Indiana University which was studying the spread of "false and misleading ideas, hate speech and subversive propaganda" online. Pai questioned the value of the project, writing, "should taxpayer money be used to monitor your speech and evaluate your 'partisanship'?" Truthy researchers defended the project, writing, "we do not monitor individual people. The tweets we analyze are public and accessible by anyone." Indiana University issued a press release which said "the Truthy project is a basic computing research project designed to provide analytical insight into the ways in which information is spread across social media networks such as Twitter." U.S. House Science Committee Chairman Lamar Smith sent a letter to the National Science Foundation announcing a review of the grant.

In 2017, Pai removed from circulation a proposal introduced by Tom Wheeler which would have required cable providers to make their programming available on third-party devices.

In June 2019, the FCC under Pai allowed telecommunications companies to automatically sign up their users in call-blocking services. The measure was proposed by Pai, who said that it would reduce "unwanted robocalls". In response, FCC Commissioner Jessica Rosenworcel argued that the FCC should go further in mandating free call-blocking services.

In July 2020, the FCC under Pai approved the creation of a new number 9-8-8, for the hotline for suicide prevention; the old hotline was numbered 1-800-273-8255, while the new hotline came into effect in July 2022.

=== Net neutrality in the United States ===
In a hearing on net neutrality in 2014, Pai said that he was committed to a free and open internet and that it was not the FCC's role to determine net neutrality. He testified that "a dispute this fundamental is not for us, five unelected individuals, to decide. Instead, it should be resolved by the people's elected representatives, those who choose the direction of government, and those whom the American people can hold accountable for that choice." Later, Pai voted against the FCC's 2015 Open Internet Order, classifying internet service under Title II of the Communications Act of 1934, which bars certain providers from "mak[ing] any unjust or unreasonable discrimination in charges, practices, classifications, regulations, facilities, or services". He said in December 2016 that he believed Title II net neutrality's "days [were] numbered", and was described by The New York Times as a stickler for strict application of telecommunications law and limits on the FCC's authority.

In a speech two weeks before the FCC's scheduled December 2017 vote on net neutrality, Pai was critical of celebrities including Cher, Mark Ruffalo, and Alyssa Milano for boosting opposition to the planned repeal. In response to criticism from Ruffalo, Pai said "Getting rid of government authority over the Internet is the exact opposite of authoritarianism. Government control is the defining feature of authoritarians, including the one in North Korea." Pai said Twitter and other tech companies were hypocritical for arguing for a free and open internet while, according to Pai, such companies "routinely block or discriminate against content they don't like".

The day before the FCC's scheduled vote on net neutrality, Pai appeared in a video entitled "Ajit Pai Wants The Internet To Know You Can Still Harlem Shake After Net Neutrality". The controversial video showed him dancing to the "Harlem Shake" and buying products online, including a toy lightsaber. In the video, Pai is shown dancing next to Martina Markota, a proponent of the Pizzagate conspiracy theory and a staff member at the Daily Caller, the media outlet that produced the video. In response to the video, Star Wars actor Mark Hamill said Pai was "unworthy" of holding the Jedi weapon, as "a Jedi acts selflessly for the common man". Baauer, the creator of the song featured in the video, threatened to take legal action against Pai alongside his record label for Pai's use of the song in his video.

As chairman, he also closed an investigation into zero-rating practices by wireless providers T-Mobile, AT&T, and Verizon. On May 18, 2017, the Federal Communications Commission took the first formal step toward dismantling the net neutrality rules, and on December 14, 2017, voted to reverse Title II regulations after a contentious public comment period.

In February 2018, the National Rifle Association of America (NRA) awarded Pai with the Charlton Heston Courage Under Fire Award for repealing net neutrality rules despite facing heavy public criticism. As part of the award, a handmade Kentucky long gun was gifted to Pai. This gift caused former White House ethics attorney Walter Shaub to question if Pai, a federal employee, had violated ethics rules by accepting gifts from lobbyists such as the NRA. Pai ultimately refused the gift.

When the U.S. Senate voted by 52–47 "to put the Federal Communications Commission's net-neutrality rules back in place" in May 2018, Pai was said to be "upset", stating having no net neutrality rules "will help promote digital opportunity" while making "high-speed Internet access available to every single American". Regarding "Democrats' effort to reinstate heavy-handed government regulation of the Internet", Ajit Pai conceded it would fail in the House.

During an investigation of fake comments in support and against net neutrality, Pai refused to hand over evidence or help New York's Attorney General in determining the scope of manipulation by ISPs of the public comment process.

=== Prison inmate telephone calling costs ===
Pai argued against adoption of the FCC 2013 analysis and proposed rulemaking regarding the high cost of inmate telephone calls, referred to as Inmate Calling Service (ICS) by the FCC. He submitted his written dissent in which he argued that the nature of the exclusive single carrier contract between private ICS providers and prison administrators meant inmates cannot "count on market competition to keep prices for inmate calling services just and reasonable". (ICS has become a $1.2 billion telecommunications industry and the two largest providers in the United States were private equity-backed companies.) Prior to the FCC's imposition of rate caps on interstate prison and jail phone calls in February 2014, the largest ICS provider Global Tel-Link (GTL) – which has been profitably bought and sold by private equity firms such as American Securities and Veritas Capital – charged some of the highest rates in the US – up to $17.30 for a 15-minute call. The 2013 FCC analysis described how, in some cases, long-distance calls are charged six times the rate on the outside.

Acting Chairwoman Clyburn concurred with her order and both Jessica Rosenworcel and Pai dissented and issued statements. Pai opposed the FCC imposition of "safe harbor" of 12 cents with a cap of 21 cents on private ICS providers like GTL and CenturyLink Public Communications, arguing instead for a "simple proposal to cap interstate rates, with one rate for jails and a lower rate for prisons" that are cost-based to protect providers and ensure "some return on investment". Pai also argued that the FCC was not well equipped to micromanage rates at each and every prison.

In 2015, Pai opposed rate caps on intrastate inmate calls over which courts have ruled the FCC has no jurisdiction, notwithstanding rates as high as $14 per minute. He raised concerns about the increased use of contraband cell phones in prisons.

In November 2016, the ICS providers won a halt on the regulation rules. Pai criticized Democrats for appealing. Shortly after his January 23 confirmation as chairman, Pai withdrew support for the FCC case involving GTL and CenturyLink set for February 6, 2017, which had called for establishing FCC jurisdiction over rates set by states. In June 2017, the US Court of Appeals struck down a large part of the FCC's ICS order.

=== Lifeline program ===
In 2016, Pai called for an investigation of potential fraud among beneficiaries of the agency's Lifeline subsidy for telecommunication services, contending that "apparent duplicates" who had signed up for the program improperly received $476 million annually. He rescinded permissions for nine new broadband providers selected by the previous FCC to participate in the program (along with more than 900 others) after becoming agency chairman, stating the new providers had not followed FCC guidelines requiring them to coordinate with the National Tribal Telecommunications Association in order to participate in the Lifeline program. Pai argued the rules had been improperly circumvented by the previous Democratic chairman, former lobbyist Tom Wheeler.

=== Sinclair Broadcast Group ===
In November 2017, two Democratic members of the U.S. House of Representatives, John Conyers (Michigan) and David Cicilline (Rhode Island), asked David L. Hunt, the inspector general of the FCC, to investigate whether Pai's legislative actions regarding the relaxation of broadcast ownership rules were biased in favor of Sinclair Broadcast Group, a large owner of broadcast television stations that, since the formation of its now-defunct News Central format in 2003, produces conservative news and commentary segments that the group requires its stations to insert into certain local newscasts. The FCC, under Pai, undertook a number of actions that the legislators believe would benefit Sinclair – which has lobbied for such changes for several years – including rolling back certain broadcast television station ownership limitations (including allowing exceptions to duopoly rules that forbid common ownership of two television stations in the same market if both are among the four highest-rated or if such a combination would dilute independent media voices, reinstating a 1985 discount quota on UHF stations repealed two years earlier by Wheeler and his Democratic-led majority, a requirement dating to the FCC's inception for broadcast outlets to maintain office operations within the community of their primary local coverage areas, and removing ownership attribution rules applying to joint sales and shared services agreements). A spokeswoman for Pai said "the request appears to be part of many Democrats' attempt to target one particular company because of its perceived political views ... Any claim that Chairman Pai is modifying the rules now to benefit one particular company is completely baseless."

From late 2017, the FCC inspector general's office investigated Pai regarding the proposed Sinclair-Tribune merger; this was made publicly known in February 2018. The office concluded in August 2018 that it "found no evidence, nor even the suggestion, of impropriety, unscrupulous behavior, favoritism towards Sinclair, or lack of impartiality". The office also concluded that Pai's decisions regarding Sinclair were consistent with policy positions he had previously endorsed in public.

In July 2018, the FCC under Pai ordered that the proposed Sinclair-Tribune merger be subject to administrative law judge hearings, due to allegations that Sinclair was planning to illegally retain control of stations it was divesting from. For this action, the FCC was criticized by President Trump, who said he wanted a merged company providing a "conservative voice". In August 2018, Tribune broke off the merger.

In May 2020, the FCC under Pai reached an agreement for Sinclair to pay a record FCC fine of $48 million for deceptive practices, in return for ending three FCC investigations into the company. FCC Commissioners Jessica Rosenworcel and Geoffrey Starks argued against the agreement, as they wanted the investigations to be fully completed and made public.

=== L-band 5G networking ===
On April 16, 2020, Pai asked the other FCC commissioners to approve an application to "deploy a low-power terrestrial nationwide network in the L-Band that would primarily support 5G and Internet of Things services", in spite of a report issued by the DoD raising concerns about the potential impact it could have on the operational capabilities of the US military, specifically with regard to GPS coverage.

=== Section 230 ===
On October 15, 2020, Pai released an official statement pledging that he would clarify Section 230, a portion of the Communications Decency Act that provides immunity for website publishers of third-party content. President Donald Trump had previously threatened to punish Facebook and Twitter for alleged anti-conservative bias after the companies blocked a series of New York Post stories about the Hunter Biden email controversy. Under Section 230, social media companies are granted First Amendment rights, but are legally distinct from press publications.

== Harassment claims ==
In 2017, Pai publicly complained that net neutrality protesters had targeted his family. Messages directed at his children were put up near his suburban Virginia home saying that "They will come to know the truth. Dad murdered Democracy in cold blood" and "How will they ever look you in the eye again?" No group took responsibility for the provocative signs, although the advocacy organization Popular Resistance left flyers on Pai's neighbors' doors that included his picture, age, and weight as part of a campaign they called "Ajit-ation".

Political offices
Preceded by Tom Wheeler	Chair of the Federal Communications Commission; 2017–2021	Succeeded by Jessica Rosenworcel
