= Federal Communications Commission Open Internet Order (2010) =

Set of regulations

The Federal Communications Commission Open Internet Order of 2010 is a set of regulations that move towards the establishment of the internet neutrality concept. Some opponents of net neutrality believe such internet regulation would inhibit innovation by preventing providers from capitalizing on their broadband investments and reinvesting that money into higher quality services for consumers. Supporters of net neutrality argue that the presence of content restrictions by network providers represents a threat to individual expression and the rights of the First Amendment. Open Internet strikes a balance between these two camps by creating a compromised set of regulations that treats all internet traffic in "roughly the same way". In Verizon v. FCC, the Court of Appeals for the D.C. Circuit vacated portions of the order that the court determined could only be applied to common carriers.

== Background ==
The United States Federal Communications Commission established four principles of "open internet" in 2005:

- Consumers deserve access to the lawful Internet content of their choice.
- Consumers should be allowed to run applications and use services of their choice, subject to the needs of law enforcement.
- Consumers should be able to connect their choice of legal devices that do not harm the network.
- Consumers deserve to choose their network providers, application and service providers, and content providers of choice.

These tenets of open internet essentially encapsulate the ideas of net neutrality. From 2005 until the establishment of Open Internet in December 2010, these standards existed in name only. In 2009, FCC Commissioner Julius Genachowski revamped these principles by adding the idea that internet service providers may not discriminate against content in any way. After an extensive debate about the viability of net neutrality, the FCC approved Open Internet on December 21, 2010.

== Details ==
The Open Internet Order "creates two classes of internet access, one for fixed-line providers and the other for the wireless Net." These regulations adopt an aggressive net neutrality stance towards fixed line broadband providers but a more lenient approach towards wireless providers. They follow three specific rules:

- Transparency. Fixed and mobile broadband providers must disclose the network management practices, performance characteristics, and terms and conditions of their broadband services
- No blocking. Fixed broadband providers may not block lawful content, applications, services, or non-harmful devices; mobile broadband providers may not block lawful websites, or block applications that compete with their voice or video telephony services.
- No unreasonable discrimination. Fixed broadband providers may not unreasonably discriminate in transmitting lawful network traffic.

These rules follow the basic principles of open internet established in 2005, but they embody specific language that regulates fixed-line broadband more closely than wireless internet. The reason that “wireless carriers are regulated far more loosely ” is because by the virtue of their service, these carriers are much more constrained than fixed-line connections. FCC officials claim that technical limitations of wireless internet necessitate looser regulations.

=== Rules ===
The FCC's net neutrality R&O put forward the following rules to govern non-discrimination online:

§8.1 Purpose.
The purpose of this Part is to preserve the Internet as an open platform enabling consumer choice, freedom of expression, end-user control, competition, and the freedom to innovate without permission.
§8.3 Transparency.
A person engaged in the provision of broadband Internet access service shall publicly disclose accurate information regarding the network management practices, performance, and commercial terms of its broadband Internet access services sufficient for consumers to make informed choices regarding use of such services and for content, application, service, and device providers to develop, market, and maintain Internet offerings. (Note: The rule does not require public disclosure of competitively sensitive information or information that would compromise network security or undermine the efficacy of subject to reasonable network management practices.)
§8.5 No Blocking.
A person engaged in the provision of fixed broadband Internet access service, insofar as such person is so engaged, shall not block lawful content, applications, services, or non-harmful devices, subject to reasonable network management.
A person engaged in the provision of mobile broadband Internet access service, insofar as such person is so engaged, shall not block consumers from accessing lawful websites, subject to reasonable network management; nor shall such person block applications that compete with the provider's voice or video telephony services, subject to reasonable network management.
§8.7 No Unreasonable Discrimination.
A person engaged in the provision of fixed broadband Internet access service, insofar as such person is so engaged, shall not unreasonably discriminate in transmitting lawful network traffic over a consumer's broadband Internet access service. Reasonable network management shall not constitute unreasonable discrimination.

== Controversy ==
The issue at stake regarding Open Internet is whether the government should regulate internet access or whether the internet is best left to flourish unregulated. In April 2010, these arguments were tested in court, pitting Comcast against FCC regulators. A federal appeals court for the District of Columbia ruled in favor of Comcast in a unanimous 3-0 decision. The decision focused on the narrow principle of whether the FCC had the right to regulate Comcast's network principles. In fact, the opinion was written so narrowly as to prompt the former legal counsel for the FCC, Sam Feder, to classify it as "the worst of all worlds for the F.C.C.” In his estimation, the court case made it all but impossible for the FCC to expect an appeal victory, but it also opened up enough alternatives for the FCC to accomplish its same goals that Congress would be unlikely to give the FCC regulatory authority over the internet. Given these concerns, the FCC revised its plan for net neutrality, and the result of that revision was the release of the current Open Internet rules. This controversy has often split along party lines with Democrats supporting the regulation and Republicans opposing it. Democrats believe that Open Internet is essential to providing fair access to information, but Republicans argue that the best way for the internet to flourish is for the government to stay out of it. However, in a major exception to this rule, President George W. Bush (R) decided to impose net neutrality regulation on Comcast in 2008.

The FCC has continued to encounter difficulties in their efforts to establish an open internet policy. A 2014 ruling by a federal appeals court struck down rules implemented by the FCC pertaining to net neutrality. The court's decision emphasized the FCC's distinction between information services (broadband providers) and telecommunications services, which are treated as common carriers. Because the FCC had previously chosen not to classify broadband providers as a telecommunications service, the court ruled them exempt from treatment as common carriers.

== Support and opposition ==
The current proposal for Open Internet was opposed by the FCC's two Republican officials, Robert McDowell and Meredith Attwell Baker. They believe that the current order will stifle internet innovation. They also believe that the regulation will not hold up to judicial review. McDowell himself believes that the FCC "is defying the court and also circumventing the will of Congress."

Democrats and left-leaning organizations are disappointed with the rule as well because they claim that it does not go far enough. Prior to the passage of the regulations, The Progressive Change Campaign Committee attacked Democratic FCC Commissioner Michael Copps, saying "Internet users across America will have lost a hero if Commissioner Copps caves to pressure from big business and supports FCC Chairman Genachowski's fake Net Neutrality rules — rules written by AT&T, Comcast, and Verizon, the very companies the public is depending on the FCC to regulate strongly."

In his defense, Copps did not fully support the measure; however, he did feel as though it was a step in the right direction towards Net Neutrality. He said that “The item we will vote on tomorrow is not the one I would have crafted, but I believe we have been able to make the current iteration better than what was originally circulated. If vigilantly and vigorously implemented by the Commission — and if upheld by the courts — it could represent an important milestone in the ongoing struggle to safeguard the awesome opportunity-creating power of the open Internet.”

FCC Chairman Julius Genachowski also supported the decision, invoking the actions of the past Republican administration. He said that "The rules of the road we adopt today are rooted in ideas first articulated by Republican Chairmen Michael Powell and Kevin Martin, and endorsed in a unanimous FCC policy statement in 2005.

President Obama voiced his support for the measure as well, "calling the FCC's decision a victory for consumers, free speech, and "American innovation." President Obama will also be fulfilling a campaign promise to institute some form of Net Neutrality regulation.

== Litigation ==
On January 14, 2014, in Verizon v. FCC the United States Court of Appeals for the District of Columbia Circuit vacated the "No blocking" and "No unreasonable discrimination" rules of the order. The court upheld the "Transparency" rule in the same ruling.

In the aftermath of the 2014 Verizon decision, on February 19, 2014, the FCC Chairman announced that the FCC would not appeal the court ruling, that he intended to seek new rules that would be consistent with the D.C. Circuit's opinion, and opened a new proceeding (GN Docket No. 14-28, "Preserving the Open Internet") asking for general public comment. On April 24, the chairman announced he would be circulating a draft Open Internet Notice of Proposed Rulemaking for the next open FCC meeting on May 15.
