= Net neutrality in the United States =

ISP non-discrimination on internet data

In the United States, net neutrality—the principle that Internet service providers (ISPs) should make no distinctions between different kinds of content on the Internet, and to not discriminate based on such distinctions—has been an issue of contention between end-users and ISPs since the 1990s. With net neutrality, ISPs may not intentionally block, slow down, or charge different rates for specific online content. Without net neutrality, ISPs may prioritize certain types of traffic, meter others, or potentially block specific types of content, while charging consumers different rates for that content.

A core issue to net neutrality is how ISPs should be classified under the Communications Act of 1934 as amended by the Telecommunications Act of 1996: as either Title I "information services" or Title II "common carrier services". The classification determines the Federal Communications Commission's (FCC) authority over ISPs: the FCC would have significant ability to regulate ISPs if classified under Title II, but would have little control over them if classified under Title I. Because the Communications Act has not been amended by Congress to account for ISPs, the FCC had taken the authority to designate how ISPs are classified, as affirmed by the Supreme Court in the case National Cable & Telecommunications Ass'n v. Brand X Internet Services (2005), which relied on the judicial principle of the Chevron deference, where the court deferred to administration agencies' interpretation of Congressional mandates.

The five member FCC commission changes with each new administration, and no more than three members may be of the same political party, thus the FCC's attitudes and rule-making regarding net neutrality shifted relatively frequently through the 2020s. Generally, under Democratic administrations, the FCC has favored net neutrality, while the agency under Republican leadership eschew the concept.

The Supreme Court case Loper Bright Enterprises v. Raimondo (2024) overturned the Chevron deference, and as a result, the Sixth Circuit ruled in 2025 that the FCC does not have the authority to classify ISPs as Title II services, further ruling that ISPs are Title I information services based on the 1996 amendment. This means net neutrality is no longer mandated at the federal level, and the legality of whether ISPs may act based on differences in Internet traffic is left to the states. Some states, such as California, have implemented their own versions of net neutrality since this decision.

== Regulatory history ==
=== Early history (1980 – early 2000s) ===
Major events related to net neutrality in the United States Red: Bush administration Yellow: Obama administration Green: Trump administration Blue: Biden administration
2003	Introduction of net neutrality concept
2004
2005	National Cable & Telecommunications Association v. Brand X Internet Services
2006–2009
2010	Comcast v. FCC
2010	FCC Open Internet Order 2010
2011–2013
2014	Verizon Communications Inc. v. FCC
2015	FCC Open Internet Order 2015
2016	United States Telecom Ass'n v. FCC
2017
2018	FCC "Restoring Internet Freedom"; net neutrality banned
2019	Mozilla v. FCC
2020
2021	Executive Order 14036, "Promoting Competition in the American Economy"
2022–2023
2024	Net neutrality officially restored by FCC
2025	Sixth Circuit rules FCC lacks authority absent Chevron deference

The ideas underlying net neutrality have a long pedigree in telecommunications practice and regulation. Services such as telegrams and the phone network (officially, the public switched telephone network or PSTN) have been considered common carriers under U.S. law since the Mann–Elkins Act of 1910, which means that they have been akin to public utilities and expressly forbidden to give preferential treatment. The Communications Act of 1934 created the Federal Communications Commission (FCC) to regulate the industry and ensure fair pricing and access. Different titles of the Act covered different modes of communication, but primary focus on the debate of net neutrality has been on Titles I and II. The Act distinguished between common carriers, who were bound under Title II of the Act, and other telecommunication systems of the time, covered broadly under Title I. Within Title II, common carriers such as the phone networks were to be regulated by the FCC as to assure reasonable pricing rates and non-discriminatory practices. Systems under Title I were left to be unregulated by the FCC.

In the late 1980s the Internet became legally available for commercial use, and in the early years of public use of the Internet, this was its main use – public access was limited and largely reached through dial-up modems (as was the Bulletin board system dial-up culture that preceded it). The Internet was viewed more as a commercial service than a domestic and societal system. However, by the late 1990s and early 2000s, the Internet started to become common in households and wider society. Also in the 1980s, arguments about the public interest requirements of the telecommunications industry in the U.S. arose; whether companies involved in broadcasting were best viewed as community trustees, with obligations to society and consumers, or mere market participants with obligations only to their shareholders. The legal debate about net neutrality regulations of the 2000s echoes this debate.

By the 1990s, some U.S. politicians began to express concern over protecting the Internet:

How can government ensure that the nascent Internet will permit everyone to be able to compete with everyone else for the opportunity to provide any service to all willing customers? Next, how can we ensure that this new marketplace reaches the entire nation? And then how can we ensure that it fulfills the enormous promise of education, economic growth, and job creation?

— Al Gore, 1994,

The Communications Act of 1934 was amended with the Telecommunications Act of 1996, which besides other provisions, defined "information services" as "the offering of a capability for generating, acquiring, storing, transforming, processing, retrieving, utilizing, or making available information via telecommunications", and covered only under Title I unregulated by the FCC.

In the early 2000s, legal scholars such as Tim Wu and Lawrence Lessig raised the issue of neutrality in a series of academic papers addressing regulatory frameworks for packet networks. Wu is credited with introducing the term "network neutrality" in his 2003 paper "Network Neutrality, Broadband Discrimination". Wu had found based on behaviors of broadband providers in the early 2000s that there could be potential for commercial interests to interfere with natural evolution of new innovations on the Internet, such as those using higher bandwidth like voice and video applications. Wu outlined the benefits and drawbacks of governmental regulation for net neutrality, writing "Communications regulators over the next decade will spend increasing time on conflicts between the private interests of broadband providers and the public’s interest in a competitive innovation environment centered on the Internet."

Papers from Wu and others in the early 2000s sparked debate among academics in information technology and legal areas to device possible frameworks for net neutrality that could be applied within U.S. laws; these discussions paralleled similar concurrent ones in Europe, though due to its different governmental structure, took on different forms of implementation. Within the U.S., media and politicians learned of these regulatory suggestions, leading to the start of net neutrality principles within the government.

=== Attempts at regulation under Title I information services (2000–2015) ===
==== Brand X and FCC's authority to classify services (2000–2005) ====
In the wake of the Telecommunications Act of 1996, the introduction of "information services" under Title I prompted many cable-based Internet access providers to urge the FCC to classify their services as Title I information services, rather than as cable providers under the Act's Title III which required them to provide open access to other service provides. The FCC took in comments, and after providing its initial findings in 2002, issued "Inquiry Concerning High-Speed Access to the Internet over Cable and Other Facilities" in which it had determined that cable ISPs were neither a telecommunications provider (under Title II) nor a cable provider (under Title III) but were solely an information service that fell under Title I and thus could operate unregulated by the FCC.

Several non-cable ISPs and other industry groups sued the FCC, challenging this ruling in multiple courts. The cases were consolidated to the Ninth Circuit. In May 2003, the Ninth Circuit vacated the FCC's ruling, stating that cable ISPs had a telecommunications function and thus should be regulated under Title II. The National Cable & Telecommunications Association challenged the ruling, and while the Ninth Circuit refused to rehear the case en banc, the Supreme Court agreed to hear the case. The Court announced its judgment in June 2005. The 6–3 decision reversed the Ninth Circuit's ruling, deeming that the FCC had properly defined cable ISPs as an information service. The majority opinion relied on the Chevron deference, a principle that the judicial body gives deference to an executive agency's interpretation of legislation outlining its granted powers as long as that interpretation is reasonable and consistent. While the ruling was unfavorable for proponents of net neutrality, Brand X established that the FCC had powers to classify Internet services subject to their interpretation, which has played a key role in how net neutrality has since played out in the United States with changing administrations.

The majority opinion in Brand X was authored by Justice Clarence Thomas, who has subsequently stated that he regrets the decision, in his dissent to Baldwin v. United States.

==== FCC promotes freedom without regulation (2004) ====
In February 2004, then Federal Communications Commission Chairman Michael Powell announced a set of non-discrimination principles, which he called the principles of "Preserving Network Freedom", based on studies from Tim Wu and Phil Weiser and other academics from the previous years. Powell recognized that it was still early to have a clear picture of what government regulation should be for net neutrality, but agreed that based on practices of broadband operators of the past few years, it was necessary to establish what rights consumers should expect from broadband service. In a speech at the Silicon Flatirons Symposium, Powell encouraged ISPs to offer users these four freedoms:

1. Freedom to access content – Consumers should have access to their choice of legal content
2. Freedom to run applications – Consumers should be able to run applications of their choice
3. Freedom to attach devices – Consumers should be permitted to attach any devices they choose to the connection in their homes
4. Freedom to obtain service plan information – Consumers should receive meaningful information regarding their service plans

In early 2005, in the Madison River case, the FCC for the first time showed the willingness to enforce its network neutrality principles by opening an investigation about Madison River Communications, a local telephone carrier that was blocking Vonage's voice over IP (VoIP) service in its digital subscriber line (DSL) offering to customers. At the time, while the FCC classified cable providers under Title I as an information provider (as per the Brand X case) and were unregulated, services such as DSL were still considered under Title II as a common carrier, and were bound by non-discriminatory regulation from the FCC. Nevertheless, the FCC's investigation led to a settlement between the FCC and Madison River Communications before any further litigation occurred, with Madison River agreeing to stop blocking VoIP traffic and paying a $15,000 fine. While the action did not set any precedent for the FCC's stance on net neutrality, the Madison River case was an indication the agency was willing to uphold Powell's principles. Shortly after the case was settled, the FCC issued a new rule in 2005 to reclassified DSL as a Title I information service and allowing them to operate unregulated by the FCC.

==== CLEC, dial-up, and DSL deregulation (2004–2005) ====
In 2004, the court case USTA v. FCC voided the FCC's authority to enforce rules requiring telephone operators to unbundle certain parts of their networks at regulated prices. This caused the economic collapse of many competitive local exchange carriers (CLEC).

In the United States, broadband services were historically regulated differently according to the technology by which they were carried. While cable Internet has always been classified by the FCC as an information service free of most regulation, DSL was regulated as a telecommunications service. In 2005, the FCC reclassified Internet access across the phone network, including DSL, as "information service" relaxing the common carrier regulations and unbundling requirement.

During the FCC's hearing, the National Cable & Telecommunications Association urged the FCC to adopt the four criteria laid out in its 2005 Internet Policy Statement as the requisite openness. This made up a voluntary set of four net neutrality principles. Implementation of the principles was not mandatory; that would require an FCC rule or federal law. The modified principles were as follows:

1. Consumers are entitled to access the lawful Internet content of their choice;
2. Consumers are entitled to run applications and services of their choice, subject to the needs of law enforcement;
3. Consumers are entitled to connect their choice of legal devices that do not harm the network; and
4. Consumers are entitled to competition among network providers, application and service providers, and content providers.

In December 2006, the AT&T/Bell South merger agreement defined net neutrality as an agreement on the part of the broadband provider: "not to provide or to sell to Internet content, application or service providers ... any service that privileges, degrades or prioritizes any (data) packet transmitted over AT&T/BellSouth's wireline broadband Internet access service based on its source, ownership or destination."

==== Comcast v. FCC (2005–2010) ====
In 2007, Comcast, the largest cable company in the US, was found to be blocking or severely delaying BitTorrent uploads on their network using a technique which involved creating 'reset' packets (TCP RST) that appeared to come from the other party. An August 2007 report by TorrentFreak (based on substantial nationwide research led by chief researcher Andrew Norton) noted that ISPs had been throttling BitTorrent traffic for almost two years, since 2005, but Comcast was completely blocking it in at least some cases. This was later verified by both the EFF and Associated Press. On March 27, 2008, Comcast and BitTorrent reached an agreement to work together on network traffic where Comcast was to adopt a protocol-neutral stance "as soon as the end of [2008]", and explore ways to "more effectively manage traffic on its network at peak times." In December 2009, Comcast reached an out-of-court settlement of a class action lawsuit for US$16 million, admitting no wrongdoing and amounting to no more than US$16 per affected account.

In August 2008, the FCC made its first Internet network management decision. It voted 3-to-2 to uphold a complaint against Comcast ruling that it had illegally inhibited users of its high-speed Internet service from using file-sharing software because it throttled the bandwidth available to certain customers for video files to ensure that other customers had adequate bandwidth. The FCC imposed no fine, but required Comcast to end such blocking in the year 2008, ordered Comcast to disclose the details of its network management practices within 30 days, submit a compliance plan for ending the offending practices by the end of the year, and disclose to the public the details of intended future practices. Then-FCC chairman Kevin J. Martin said the order was meant to set a precedent, that Internet providers and all communications companies could not prevent customers from using their networks the way they see fit, unless there is a good reason. In an interview Martin stated that "We are preserving the open character of the Internet" and "We are saying that network operators can't block people from getting access to any content and any applications."

In two rulings, in April and June 2010 respectively, the United States Court of Appeals for the District of Columbia Circuit ruled against the FCC; the April ruling denied to grant the FCC's request for a cease-and-desist order against Comcast related to BitTorrent transfers, while the June ruling vacated the FCC's order against Comcast. The U.S. Court of Appeals ruled that the FCC has no powers to regulate any Internet provider's network, or the management of its practices: "[the FCC] 'has failed to tie its assertion' of regulatory authority to an actual law enacted by Congress", and that the FCC lacked the authority under Title I to force ISPs to keep their networks open, while employing reasonable network management practices, to all forms of legal content. In wake of the rulings, the FCC stated it would continue its fight for net neutrality.

==== FCC's conditions for spectrum auction (2008) ====
In February 2008, Kevin Martin, then Chairman of the Federal Communications Commission, said that he is "ready, willing and able," to prevent broadband ISPs from unreasonably interfering with their subscribers' access to content on the internet.

In 2008, when the FCC auctioned off the 700 MHz block of wireless spectrum in anticipation of the DTV transition, Google promised to enter a bid of $4.6 billion, if the FCC required the winning licensee to adhere to four conditions:

- Open applications: Consumers should be able to download and use any software application, content, or services they desire;
- Open devices: Consumers should be able to use a handheld communications device with whatever.. wireless network they prefer;
- Open services: Third parties (resellers) should be able to acquire wireless services from a 700 MHz licensee on a wholesale basis, based on reasonably nondiscriminatory commercial terms;
- Open networks: Third parties, such as Internet service providers, should be able to interconnect at any technically feasible point in a 700 MHz licensee's wireless network.

These conditions were broadly similar to the FCC's Internet Policy Statement; FCC's applications and content were combined into a single bullet, and an extra bullet requiring wholesale access for third party providers was included. The FCC adopted only two of these four criteria for the auction, viz., open devices and open applications, and only applied these conditions to the nationwide C block portion of the band.

President Barack Obama's American Recovery and Reinvestment Act of 2009 called for an investment of $7.2 billion in broadband infrastructure and included an openness stipulation.

==== FCC Open Internet Order (2010) ====
Towards the end of 2009, the FCC began drafting new rules that would include a series of proposals that would prevent telecommunications, cable and wireless companies from blocking certain information on the Internet. FCC Chair Julius Genachowski proposed to add two rules to the current FCC policy statement in 2005, viz., the nondiscrimination principle that ISPs must not discriminate against any content or applications, and the transparency principle, requiring that ISPs disclose all their policies to customers. He argued that wireless should be subject to the same network neutrality as wireline providers. In October 2009, the FCC gave notice of proposed rule making on net neutrality.

Following the ruling in Comcast v. FCC in March 2010, the FCC amended these rules to account for the court's decision. The FCC voted in December 2010 to approve the FCC Open Internet Order banning cable television and telephone service providers from preventing access to competitors or certain web sites. The order established six net "neutrality principles" that would apply to ISPs:

- Transparency: Consumers and innovators have a right to know the basic performance characteristics of their Internet access and how their network is being managed;
- No blocking: This includes a right to send and receive lawful traffic, prohibits the blocking of lawful content, apps, services and the connection of non-harmful devices to the network;
- Level playing field: Consumers and innovators have a right to a level playing field. This means a ban on unreasonable content discrimination. There is no approval for so-called "pay for priority" arrangements involving fast lanes for some companies but not others;
- Network management: This is an allowance for broadband providers to engage in reasonable network management. These rules do not forbid providers from offering subscribers tiers of services or charging based on bandwidth consumed;
- Mobile: The provisions adopted today do not apply as strongly to mobile devices, though some provisions do apply. Of those that do are the broadly applicable rules requiring transparency for mobile broadband providers and prohibiting them from blocking websites and certain competitive applications;
- Vigilance: The order creates an open Internet advisory committee to assist the commission in monitoring the state of Internet openness and the effects of the rules.

The 2010 orders did not reclassify ISPs under Title II common carriers, leaving them unregulated by the FCC under Title I information services as a cumulative result of past FCC orders. The measure was denounced by net neutrality advocates as a capitulation to telecommunication companies such as allowing them to discriminate on transmission speed for their profit, especially on mobile devices like the iPad, while pro-business advocates complained about any regulation of the Internet at all.

==== Verizon v. FCC (2014) ====
While the 2010 Open Internet Order was generally favorable to ISPs, the issuing of the neutrality principles that would still apply to Title I information services was criticized by some ISPs. Verizon Communications challenged the order at the D.C. Circuit court in early 2011, asserting that the FCC had overstepped its authority by applying principles to Title I information services. The D.C. Circuit ruled in January 2014 to vacate the blocking and discrimination principles from the 2010 Open Internet Order while upholding other parts. The decision determined that the FCC improperly relied on Section 706 of the amended Communications Act, which gives the FCC authority to incentivize the deployment of telecommunications services to all Americans including those in rural and low-income areas. The FCC had relied on Section 706's language that they had authority to "promulgate rules governing broadband providers’ treatment of Internet traffic" to apply these rules to Title I information services. The Court ruled that ISPs were still specifically treated as Title I information services by the FCC, and for the FCC to be able to regulate aspects like blocking or discrimination, they would specifically have to be cataloged as telecommunication common carriers under Title II. The court agreed that FCC can regulate broadband in a general manner and may craft more specific rules that stop short of identifying service providers as common carriers.

As a response to the DC Circuit Court's decision, a dispute developed as to whether net neutrality could be guaranteed under existing law, or if reclassification of ISPs was needed to ensure net neutrality. Wheeler stated that the FCC had the authority under Section 706 of the Telecommunications Act of 1996 to regulate ISPs, while others, including President Obama, supported reclassifying ISPs as common carriers under Title II of the Communications Act of 1934. Critics of Section 706 point out that the section has no clear mandate to guarantee equal access to content provided over the internet, while subsection 202(a) of the Communications Act states that common carriers cannot "make any unjust or unreasonable discrimination in charges, practices, classifications, regulations, facilities, or services." Advocates of net neutrality have generally supported reclassifying ISPs under Title II, while FCC leadership and ISPs have generally opposed such reclassification. The FCC stated that if they reclassified ISPs as common carriers, the commission would selectively enforce Title II, so that only sections relating to broadband would apply to ISPs.

=== Reclassification as Title II common carriers (2015–2017) ===
==== Policy proposals (2014) ====
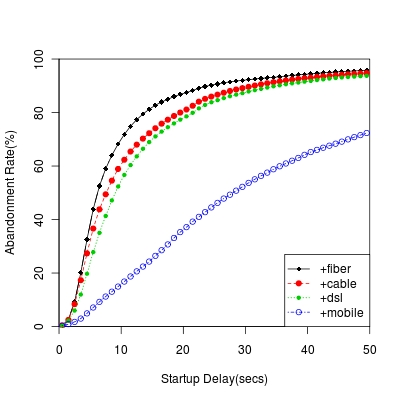
Users with faster Internet connectivity (e.g., fiber) abandon a slow-loading video at a faster rate than users with slower Internet connectivity (e.g., cable or mobile). A "fast lane" in the Internet can irrevocably decrease the user's tolerance to the relative slowness of the "slow lane".

On February 19, 2014, the FCC announced plans to formulate new rules to resume enforcing net neutrality while complying with the court rulings. However, in the event, on April 23, 2014, the FCC reported a new draft rule that would permit broadband ISPs such as Comcast and Verizon to offer content providers, such as Netflix, Disney, or Google, willing to pay a higher price, faster connection speeds, so their customers would have preferential access, thus reversing its earlier position and (so far as opinion outside the ISP sector generally agreed) would deny net neutrality.

Public response was heated, pointing out FCC chairman Tom Wheeler's past as a president and CEO of two major ISP-related organizations, and the suspicion of bias towards the profit-motives of ISPs as a result. Shortly afterwards, during late April 2014, the contours of a document leaked that indicated that the FCC under Wheeler would consider promulgating rules allowing Internet service providers (ISPs) to violate net neutrality principles by making it easier for Internet users to access certain content — whose owners paid fees to the ISPs (including cable companies and wireless ISPs) — and harder to access other content, thus undermining the traditional open architecture of the Internet. These plans received substantial backlash from activists, the mainstream press, and some other FCC commissioners. In May 2014, over 100 Internet companies — including Google, Microsoft, eBay, and Facebook — signed a letter to Wheeler voicing their disagreement with his plans, saying they represented a "grave threat to the Internet".

The FCC voted 3–2 on proposed rules to introduced tiered broadband allowances on May 15, 2014. Besides opening these rules to public comment prior to issuing a final ruling, the FCC asked the public on their opinion in regards to classifying ISPs as Title II common carrier telecommunication services. The public commenting period ran through July 2014, and garnering over one million responses, the most the FCC had ever received for rulemaking.

The FCC proposal for a tiered Internet received heavy criticism. Opponents argued that a user accessing content over the "fast lane" on the Internet would find the "slow lane" intolerable in comparison, greatly disadvantaging any content provider who is unable to pay for "fast lane" access. They argued that a tiered Internet would suppress new Internet innovations by increasing the barrier to entry. Video providers Netflix and Vimeo in their comments filed with the FCC used the research of S.S. Krishnan and Ramesh Sitaraman that provided quantitative evidence of the impact of Internet speed on online video users. Their research studied the patience level of millions of Internet video users who waited for a slow-loading video to start playing. Users with faster Internet connectivity, such as fiber-to-the-home, demonstrated less patience and abandoned their videos sooner than similar users with slower Internet connectivity.

Opponents of the tiered broadband rules declared September 10, 2014, to be the "Internet slowdown". Participating websites were purposely slowed down to show what they felt would happen if the new rules took effect. Websites that participated in the Internet slowdown included Netflix, Reddit, Tumblr, Twitter, Vimeo and Kickstarter. The Economist described the "Battle for the Net [...] now casting the upcoming FCC decision as an epic clash between "Team Internet" (a plucky band of high-tech multi-millionaires) and "Team Cable" (a dastardly bunch of Big-ISP billionaires)."

On November 10, 2014, President Obama stepped in, and recommended the FCC reclassify broadband Internet service as a telecommunications service in order to preserve net neutrality. Republicans presented legislation in January 2015 in the form of a U. S. Congress HR discussion draft bill that made concessions to net neutrality but prohibited the FCC from accomplishing that goal, or from enacting any further regulation affecting ISPs, though the bill failed to be enacted.

==== 2015 Open Internet Order ====
By January 2015, the FCC announced it had revised its prior rules and would be voting on a new preliminary ruling that defined ISPs as a Title II common carrier telecommunication service, with some necessary exemptions. Adoption of this notion would reclassify Internet service from one of information to one of telecommunications, treating it as a public good, and ensure net neutrality, according to Wheeler.

Ahead of the FCC's vote on these new rules, social media platforms had a large role on engaging the public in the debate surrounding net neutrality. Popular websites such as Tumblr, Vimeo, and Reddit also participated in the Internet slowdown on September 10, 2014, which the organization said was the largest sustained (lasting more than a single day) online protest effort in history. On January 26, 2015, popular blogging site Tumblr placed links to group Fight For The Future, a net neutrality advocacy group. The website displayed a countdown to the FCC vote on Title II on February 26, 2015. This was part of a widespread Internet campaign to sway congressional opinion and encourage users to call or submit comments to congressional representatives. Net neutrality advocacy groups such as Save the Internet coalition and Battle for the Net responded to the 2015 FCC ruling by calling for defense of the new net neutrality rules.

The FCC voted 3–2 on February 25, 2015, to pass these new rules, making exemptions for North Carolina and Tennessee where state laws had already established stronger net neutrality concepts, and would be willing to add exemptions for other states with similar laws. In response to ISP and opponent views, Wheeler commented, "This is no more a plan to regulate the Internet than the First Amendment is a plan to regulate free speech. They both stand for the same concept." Full disclosure of the rules were released for public comment on March 12, 2015, and the final rule was published on April 13, 2015.

==== United States Telecom Ass'n v. FCC (2016) ====
Following the publication of the FCC's ruling in 2015, several internet providers filed suit to challenge the FCC's ruling. The cases were combined into a single case, United States Telecom Ass'n v. FCC 825 F.3d 674 (2016), heard by a three-judge panel on the United States Court of Appeals for the District of Columbia Circuit in December 2015. The court issued its decision in June 2016, with the panel split 2–1 in favor of maintaining the FCC's ruling, stating that the Internet should be treated as a utility and not as a luxury. Internet providers signaled their intent to continue to challenge this ruling to the Supreme Court.

Several of the telecom groups petitioned the Supreme Court for writ of certiorari following the Court of Appeals ruling, ultimately falling under the case name Berninger v. Federal Communications Commission (Docket 17-489). The petition argued that the FCC did not have the power to issue the Open Internet Order, which required a re-interpretation of the Communications Act of 1934, under the Chevron deference. On November 5, 2018, seven members of the Court denied the petition, leaving in place the Court of Appeals ruling, which established that the FCC had the ability to reclassify Internet under Title II. Chief Justice John Roberts abstained due to financial conflict, and Justice Brett Kavanaugh abstained due to his previous involvement with the case history. Three Justices, Clarence Thomas, Samuel Alito, and Neil Gorsuch had recommended accepting the petition as to order a Munsingwear vacatur, in which the Appeals Court order would have been vacated, returned to that court, and have the case rendered moot due to the more recent 2018 FCC order that reversed the Open Internet Order.

=== Rollback to Title I information services under the first Trump administration (2017–2020) ===
==== Restoring Internet Freedom proposed rules ====
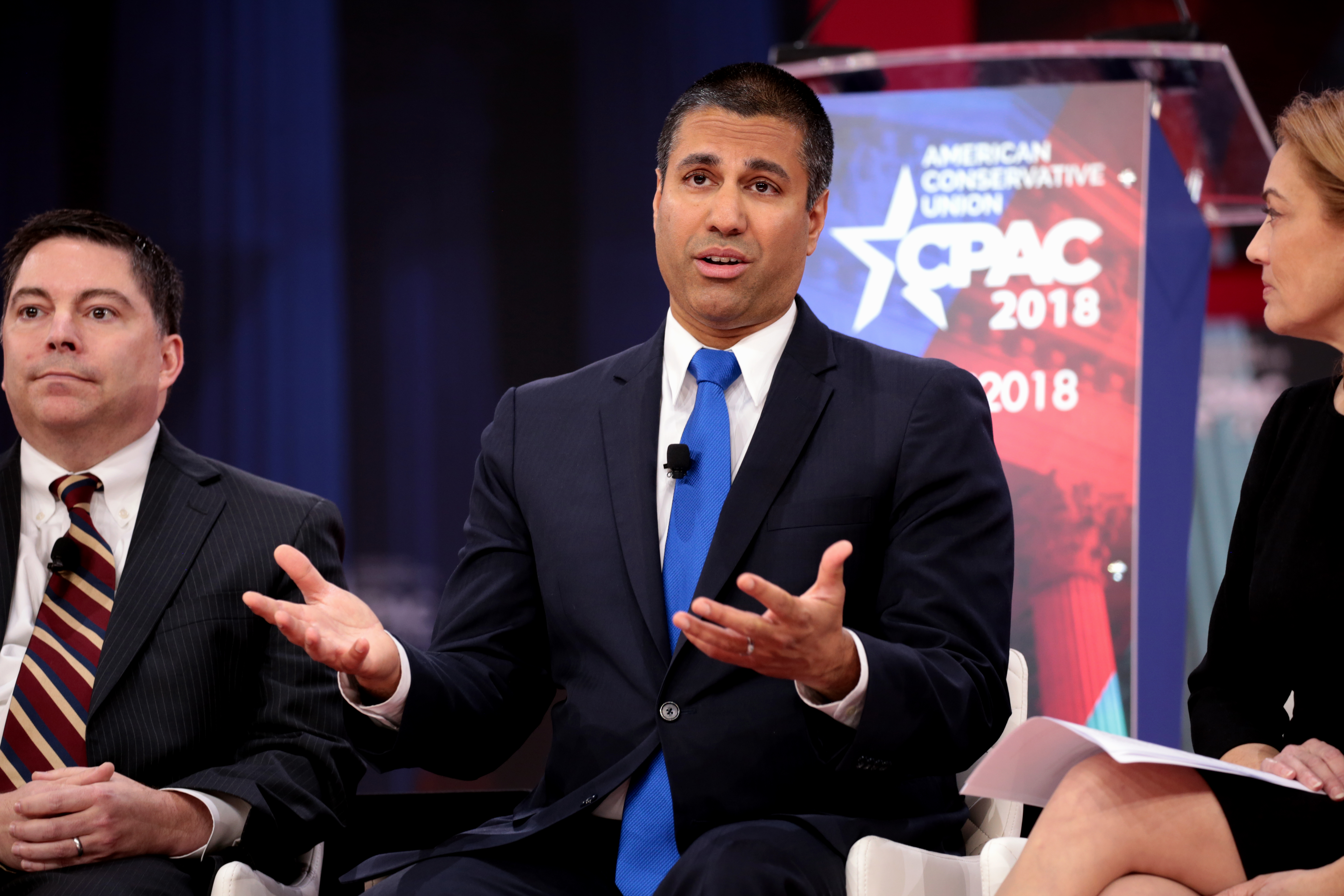
FCC Chairman Ajit Pai (center) was at the forefront of the rollback of net neutrality rules.

Donald Trump had been positioning himself for running for presidency as the FCC considered net neutrality and categorizing ISPs as Title II common carriers. He said in 2014, "Obama’s attack on the internet is another top down power grab. Net neutrality is the Fairness Doctrine. Will target conservative media."

Shortly after his inauguration in January 2017, President Trump appointed Ajit Pai as the new chairman of the FCC. Pai had previously been nominated to fill one of the required Republican seats on the commission by President Obama under the recommendation of Senate Minority Leader Mitch McConnell. Pai, who objected to the 2015 Open Internet Order, quickly began to roll back some of the policies that had been implemented by the FCC during the Obama administration, and halted an investigation into the use of zero-rating by U.S. wireless providers. After his appointment, Pai stated that he planned to "modernize" FCC policies to "match the reality of the modern marketplace", but was unsure over whether the FCC would continue to enforce the net neutrality rules or Title II classification of broadband services established in the 2015 Open Internet Order. Pai stated his opposition to the current net neutrality rules as they were "regulating against hypothetical harms", rather than trying to correct actual anti-competitive behavior, and that there was no need for such widespread government intervention when there were only a few companies that may be harming consumers or innovators. Pai argued that net neutrality rules also would "prohibit a number of pro-competitive business arrangements" and "would reduce investments" into extending the Internet infrastructure. By April 2017, Pai had indicated that the FCC would likely propose to roll back the 2015 Open Internet Order, reverting the classification of ISPs as Title II common carriers, and instead have ISPs to "voluntarily" commit to net neutrality principles, with violations to be covered by the Federal Trade Commission rather than the FCC. On April 29, 2017, a clearer understanding of the latest net neutrality compromise proposal was described.

Broadband capital expenditures by U.S. broadband providers ($ billions, 1996–2015)

On May 18, 2017, the FCC voted 2–1 to move forward with Pai's Notice of proposed rulemaking (NPRM) on "Restoring Internet freedom" rules by rolling back net neutrality regulations. The new rules were published for public viewing on July 17, 2017. The FCC supported their rules by arguing that the classification of ISPs as Title II carriers had caused them to reduce their capital expenditures in new infrastructure, threatening the future of the nation's telecommunication systems. The FCC cited a drop of approximately $1 billion in capital spending by telecoms between 2014 and 2015, based on data from the United States Telecom Association and similar figures from industry consultant Hal Singer, to demonstrate this. Analysts stated that the FCC had cherry picked this data, as about 75% of the annual changes in capital spending by telecoms between the period of 1996 to 2015 were decreases of at least $1 billion. In her dissent to this NPRM, FCC Commissioner Mignon Clyburn wrote, "I have yet to see a credible analysis that suggests that broadband provider capital expenditures have declined as a result of our 2015 Open Internet Order. ... Using the same logic that the NPRM uses, one could suggest that the FCC's classification of cable modem service as an information service in 2002 resulted in an even more precipitous drop in broadband provider investment.”

Ernesto Falcon, Legislative Council for the Electronic Frontier Foundation claimed that no such claims of CapEx reductions have been made in official reports filed with the Securities and Exchange Commission (SEC), He said that major companies can be sued by investors who assert that they lost money because of misleading information in an SEC filing, and no such penalties apply to potentially misleading statements to Congress or the public. Falcon's claim is supported by an analysis by Turner of Free Press in a report that includes 26 figures and tables, 21 of which were extracted from SEC filings and three of the remaining five came from the U.S. Census Bureau's Annual Capital Expenditures Survey. The change since the Title II Order was negative for only 5 of Turner's 24 tables, and the mean and median change over the 24 tables for which it seemed reasonable to extract a typical annualized percentage change were 8.1% and 5.2%, respectively.

==== Public commenting period and analysis of fraudulent activities ====
As required for any NPRM, a period for public commenting on the FCC's new proposed rules ran from May 18 to August 16, 2017. During the public commenting period, efforts were made by pro-net neutrality groups to get people to submit comments to the FCC in opposition to the new rules. John Oliver, the host of Last Week Tonight, encouraged his viewers to comment against the proposed FCC rules. In early June 2017, Battle for the Net, a coalition spearheaded by Fight for the Future, Free Press Action Fund, and Demand Progress, announced a "massive day of action" for July 12. Over 50,000 websites, including multinational corporations, participated in what Fight for the Future called "the largest online protest in history".

The FCC's open comment period on the proposed language of "Restoring Internet Freedom" received about 21.9 million comments, the largest influx of public comments seen by the FCC at that time; previously the FCC had gotten about 500,000 comments related to new media ownership rules in 2003 and 1.4 million comments from the Super Bowl XXXVIII halftime show controversy in 2004. As these comments were made available to the public, third-party groups began analyzing their contents, recognizing many comments that were against net neutrality shared the same language, and were considered to be duplicative. Analysis suggested that millions of these comments were fraudulent, using the same anti-net neutrality wording that had been proposed by the Center for Individual Freedom.

One of the first studies performed after the closure of the public commenting period, done on behalf of Broadband for America, which sought to repeal the Obama-era rules, found that 60% of the comments were in favor of retaining the current rules. However, the study also identified a large number of duplicate comments; if these were taken out, the unique comments favoring retaining the current rules far outweighed those seeking repeal, 1.52 million to 23,000. During and after the public commenting period, analysts reviewed the public comments and observed that a significant proportion of those using boilerplate language in support of repealing the rules had used names and addresses off known spam databases, and of those who were willing and able to be contacts asserts they left no such comment for the FCC. At least twenty-four people listed by the FCC as giving anti-net neutrality comments signed an open letter to the FCC in May 2017 requesting the comments they were asserted to have made to be removed from public record. The FCC's system for public comments, the Electronic Comment Filing System (ECFS), came under scrutiny: it uses an open application programming interface (API), along keys to that provided by the FCC, to submit comments, making it exploitable for mass-messaging.

In December 2017, the Pew Research Center issued its report in reviewing the comments, affirming that most of them were boilerplate messages, but representative of a mass campaign attempting to sway public policy. The Pew report did recognize that several of the names were nonsensical, such as variations of "John Smith", or used "The Internet", and in other cases, thousands of messages were received at nearly the same time, potential evidence of a bot spamming in comments.

Another study evaluating all the comments submitted by the process was completed at Stanford University and published in October 2018. The Stanford study forced solely on unique comments, resulting in more than 800,000 comments that were called "semantic outliers" in contrast to boilerplate language, and in a detailed review of a sampling of one thousand of these, found that 99.7% favored retaining the Obama-era rules; these came from a geographically and politically diverse set of users. Shortly after this study, New York State's Attorney General Barbara Underwood, one of the critics of the FCC's process, issued a subpoena to over a dozen advocacy groups on both sides of the net neutrality debate to determine if they had a role in the massive number of fraudulent comments left at the FCC's system. Other states, as well as the Federal Bureau of Investigation, have issued similar subpoenas on the commenting period.

Both The New York Times and BuzzFeed had filed Freedom of Information Act (FOIA) requests to the FCC to gain information on the IP addresses used in the public comment period. The FCC denied the requests in December 2018 citing that releasing this information would leave the US vulnerable to a cyberattack, and Pai wrote in an attached statement that at least 500,000 of the comments were tied to Russian addresses, interfering in the process and trying to swing the public opinion in favor of keeping the Obama-era net neutrality rules.

A separate FOIA request was made by The New York Times as well as the website Gizmodo for records pertaining to the API key logs from the ECFS, which were granted after journalists from the works filed suit against the FCC's initial denial. Data analysis led by The New York Times and Gizmodo to review the logs against those of the duplicated comments. They concluded that the duplicated comments were coming from submissions through the API assigned to CQ Roll Call, which does offer advocacy software to clients for this purpose. Gizmodo found the comments tied to the name of those that had signed the May 2017 open letter to the FCC, matching this pattern. Separately, Gizmodo found the language of the duplicated comments shares many similarities with statements made by the Center for Individual Freedom (CFIF), which had been outspoken against net neutrality of the page. Due to these investigations, CQ Roll Call, CFIF, and several other advocacy groups with access to CQ Roll Call's had been called for questioning within the New York State case against the FCC. In May 2020, Judge Lorna G. Schofield of the United States District Court for the Southern District of New York ruled that the FCC must provide The New York Times the IP addresses of all the comments from this commenting period. Judge Schofield stated that despite the FCC's claims of privacy issues, the request by the newspaper was valid to examine if any fraudulent activity interfered during the public commenting period towards the issue if the FCC's decision to repeal was "vulnerable to corruption".

The New York state attorney general's office reported in May 2021 that after evaluating the comments, they determined that about 18 million of the 21.9 million submitted were bogus. About 8.5 million of those comments were tied to co-registration promotions put forth by the telecom industry, promising consumers gift cards or entry into sweepstakes but then using their names and information to submit the comments without their knowledge. For this, the office had already reached settlement deals with three telecom companies for a total of $4 million in fines. Another 9.3 million of the comments considered bogus were in favor of net neutrality, according to the report, filed under false identities and many submitted by a single person. The attorney general also obtained a total of US$650,000 from three influencer companies paid by the telecom industry that participated in the millions of fake responses.

==== Enactment of the new order ====
Despite the ongoing analysis into fraudulent activities related to the public commenting period, and that the public comments that were deemed legitimate that weighed in favor of maintaining the 2015 Open Internet Order, the FCC announced in November 2017 that it was planning to go ahead with a final vote on December 14, 2017, to vote in the Restore Internet Freedom order and repeal the net neutrality rules. FCC commissioner Jessica Rosenworcel alleged on December 8 that the FCC was withholding evidence of fraud due to irregularities in its comment period and said the vote should be postponed until after an appropriate investigation.

Many organizations involved in the July 12 Day of Action planned an online protest for December 12. A vote was held on December 14, 2017, with a 3–2 party-line vote approving the repeal. On January 4, 2018, the current version of "Restoring Internet freedom" was made public, and was officially codified in the Federal Register on February 22, 2018, with the rules taking effect on June 11, 2018.

The FCC voted along party lines, 3–2, on December 14, 2017, to enact the Restoring Internet freedom rules and repeal the 2015 Open Internet Order.

==== Mozilla v. FCC (2017–2019) ====
Within minutes after the FCC vote on December 14, 2017, New York Attorney General Eric Schneiderman announced his intent to lead a multi-state lawsuit against the FCC to "stop illegal rollback of net neutrality". Washington Attorney General Bob Ferguson also stated his intent to sue.

Twenty-two states and the District of Columbia, led by New York's Schneiderman, filed a formal suit in the United States Court of Appeals for the District of Columbia Circuit against the FCC's ruling on January 16, 2018, calling it "arbitrary, capricious, and an abuse of discretion", and that the FCC mis-classified Internet access as a Title I service rather than Title II due to "an erroneous and unreasonable interpretation" of laws around communication services. The initial filing was withdrawn in early February 2018 only due to the fact that the FCC's ruling had not yet been published within the Federal Register. Once the new FCC rules were published in February 2018, the states, District of Columbia, joined by the Mozilla Foundation and Vimeo, and several other state and local entities and advocacy groups, refiled the suit on February 22, 2018. The cases were all consolidated under the title Mozilla v. FCC.

The FCC issued its defense on October 12, 2018, requesting the Court to reject the lawsuit, as the lawsuit filed brings "no substantial reason to second-guess the commission’s decision to eliminate rules that the agency has determined are both unlawful and unwise". Initial court hearings were held on February 1, 2019. The FCC had requested a rescheduling of the hearings due to lack of resources created by the ongoing shutdown of the government, but this request was denied by the D.C. District Court. At the hearing before three judges, the states challenging the FCC not only discussed the issues related to net neutrality, but also charged the FCC with selectively reviewing the public comments to come to its decision, thus "failed in its responsibility to engage in reasoned decision-making". ISPs argued the need to have an unregulated approach to providing high-quality services to their users, and that they would not be able to offer anything less than the full Internet to users given the competitive landscape.

The Court of Appeals issued its decision on October 1, 2019. In a multipart decision, the Court ruled that the FCC has the capability to reclassify Internet service under Title I based on the prior Brand X ruling from the Supreme Court, allowing its 2017 rule change to stand. However, the opinion stated that the FCC had "disregard of its duty" in evaluating the impact of net neutrality on public safety, using the example of throttled communications that impacted the capabilities of first responders during the 2018 Camp Fire. The opinion also stated that the FCC had not addressed how these rules affected utility pole access or other programs like the low-income Lifeline program. The Court did rule against the FCC, vacating the rule's limitations against state-level actions to enforce net neutrality as Congress had not given the FCC any such authority via the Telecommunications Act. While various parts in support of the plaintiffs requested an en banc hearing from the full Court of Appeals, the Court denied this in February 2020.

==== 2018 US Senate vote ====
In January 2018, fifty United States senators endorsed legislative action under the Congressional Review Act (CRA) to reverse the repeal of Title II net neutrality. While the effort was pushed by Democratic Senators, they had also gained support of three Republican Senators, Susan Collins, Lisa Murkowski, and John Kennedy. The motion to restore net neutrality passed in the Senate on May 16, 2018. However, efforts for the House of Representatives to pass similar legislative action through the CRA had stalled; Democratic Representatives had attempted to gain sufficient signatures for a discharge petition to force the vote on the matter, but by June 2018, were still 46 signatures short, principally along partisan lines. While the revised FCC order repealing net neutrality has become official as of June 11, 2018, the House could have taken action to reverse the decision, but even with CRA passage, the action would have to be signed into law by the President. However, the Congressional term ended before the House of Representatives could act, preventing the CRA challenge.

==== California net neutrality law (2018) ====
While various states have enacted versions of net neutrality laws, these mostly have been working within the established parameters set by the FCC. In the FCC's rollback, the ruling includes language that asserts states do not have authority to override the FCC decision. Legal experts believe this clause to be flawed and would allow states to still override the FCC's decision on net neutrality, as the language divests the FCC from regulating broadband carriers, and thus would disallow them from preventing states from regulating them.

Following the FCC's revocation of all net neutrality protections, California State Senator Scott Wiener introduced SB822, which comprehensively restored all of the protections of the 2015 Open Internet Order. The bill passed with bi-partisan support in both the State Assembly and State Senate, and on September 30, 2018, Governor Jerry Brown signed it into law. On the same day as it was signed, the US Department of Justice sued the state of California to stop the law, arguing that Congress granted the FCC the sole authority to create rules for broadband internet providers. A few days later, four lobbying groups that represent the major United States terrestrial and mobile communication carriers, United States Telecom Association, CTIA, NCTA and the American Cable Association, also sued the state of California for similar reasons as the Justice Department, claiming that the state does not have authority to regulate Internet providers. The state and the FCC announced on October 26, 2018, that they have reached agreement for California to hold off the enforcement of the law until pending legal action over the FCC's decision. Despite not being enforced, the bill went into effect on January 1, 2019.

With the October 2019 decision in Mozilla v. FCC that overturned the 2017 Order's blanket ban on state net neutrality, the U.S. government and the ISP trade groups restarted their lawsuit in August 2020 and are seeking a preliminary injunction to block enforcement of California's law until the case is concluded. However, following the election of Joe Biden as president in 2021, Biden's new Department of Justice withdrew from the challenge, leaving the ISP trade groups to continue the suit. Subsequently, the judge denied the preliminary injunction in a ruling on February 23, 2021, allowing the California law to go into effect, on the basis that the ISP trade groups will be unlikely to prevail in the challenge. The Ninth Circuit ruled unanimously in January 2022 that California's net neutrality law may continue to be enforced and cannot be overridden by the FCC as, current as of the decision, Internet services were classified as information services. The trade groups abandoned the case against the law by May 2022.

==== Save the Internet Act (2019) ====
Democratic Senators and Representatives presented the Save the Internet Act in both Houses of Congress in early March 2019. The Act, if passed, would rescind the 2017 FCC order to repeal the 2015 Open Internet Order, codify the 2015 Open Internet Order into law, and prevent the FCC from making any similar changes baring any further change in law. Republican lawmakers indicated they felt this was too extreme and were unlikely to give support to the bill. The bill cleared the House on a 232–190 vote on April 10, 2019, but both leaders in the Republican-controlled Senate and then-president Trump indicated they would stop the bill's passage.

=== Under the Biden administration (2021–2025) ===
With Joe Biden becoming president in January 2021, Ajit Pai announced his departure from the FCC in the same month. Biden named Jessica Rosenworcel, an Obama-era appointee to the FCC, as acting chairperson. Rosenworcel was a vocal proponent for net neutrality in previous FCC rulings.

On July 9, 2021, Biden signed Executive Order 14036, "Promoting Competition in the American Economy", a sweeping array of initiatives across the executive branch. Among them included instructions to the FCC to restore the net neutrality rules that had been undone during the Trump administration.

The resignation of Pai in January 2021 left the FCC at a two-two deadlock until September 2023, when Biden-nominated Anna M. Gomez was sworn in as the Commission's fifth member. Rosenworcel stated that month that the FCC plans to re-introduce net neutrality rules. While it was expected for the FCC to rule to restore net neutrality, a white paper published by telecom legal experts in 2023 warned that the rule will likely face challenges in the Supreme Court under the major questions doctrine. The FCC voted 3–2 on October 19, 2023, to approve issuing a Notice of Proposed Rulemaking (NPRM) seeking comments about rolling back to the 2015 rules. The commenting period was closed on January 18, 2024. The FCC voted in these proposed guidelines on April 25, 2024, on a 3–2 vote, returning Internet services under Title II, enforcing net neutrality. Providers under the NCTA filed suit to challenge the new rule in June 2024. Under the suit, the providers questioned whether the FCC has the authority to reclassify broadband services. While this had been settled by previous cases like Brand X the Chevron deference central to these cases was overturned in June 2024 by Loper Bright Enterprises v. Raimondo, leaving in question the capability of the FCC to enforce its net neutrality decision The Sixth Circuit granted a temporary injunction against the new net neutrality rules in July 2024, with a hearing to determine if a permanent injunction is necessary at an August hearing. On extending the stay in August 2024, the majority of the Sixth Circuit stated that due to the flip-flopping on how the FCC has classified internet services, it will be highly unlikely for the FCC to prevail using the weaker Skidmore deference. The Sixth Circuit issued its final decision in January 2025, ruling that, in the absence of Chevron the FCC's decision classifying internet service providers as a telecommunication service was inconsistent with the Telecommunications Act of 1996. The Sixth Circuit also ruled that under the statutory reading of Telecommunications Act of 1996, internet service provides should be treated as Title I information services, which would require an act of Congress to change. Advocates of net neutrality declined to appeal to the Supreme Court, saying that the appeal would likely fail with the conservative majority of the current court.

=== Under the second Trump administration (2025–present) ===
With the election of Donald Trump for his second term as president starting in 2025, Rosenworcel stepped down as chairperson of the FCC. Trump replaced her with Brendan Carr, a sitting committee member, and later named Olivia Trusty, another Republican, to fill Carr's position, who was confirmed by the Senate in June 2025. Carr is a vocal opponent of net neutrality and supports aspects such as data caps, and believes that Internet service providers should be allowed to compete without regulation, differentiating their services to draw in customers.

As part of the new administration's actions, the Broadband Equity, Access, and Deployment Program (BEAD) which promotes the deployment of broadband across the U.S., was modified to deny funds to states that enforced net neutrality programs. For a state like California, which had spent considerable resources to defend its net neutrality requirements in court, there has been debate about whether to accept the federal funds and not enforce its law, or to challenge the new BEAD rules by accepting the funds while continuing to enforce its net neutrality rules.

=== Timeline of significant events ===
- January 12, 2003 – Columbia University law professor Tim Wu coins the phrase network neutrality in a paper calling for anti-discrimination rules to be applied to internet service providers.
- June 27, 2005 – Supreme Court decides that “communications, content, and applications are allowed to pass freely over the Internet's broadband pipes.”
- September 1, 2007 – Comcast begins interfering with Bittorrent traffic on its network.
- January 9, 2008 – FCC investigates Comcast traffic policy and treatment of Bittorrent traffic.
- August 9, 2010 – Google and Verizon try to cut deal to make larger parts of internet to be exempt from protection from the net neutrality rules from the FCC.
- December 21, 2010 – FCC creates Open Internet Rules which “established high-level rules requiring transparency and prohibiting blocking and unreasonable discrimination to protect Internet openness.”
- September 23, 2011 – The Federal Register publishes the Open Internet Rules.
- January 14, 2014 – The ruling in Verizon Communications Inc. v. FCC (2014) vacates significant parts of Open Internet Order 2010.
- May 13, 2014 – FCC releases new proposal including new rules on allowing “fast lanes and slow lanes online.”
- June 13, 2014 – FCC investigates large companies such as Netflix for interconnection policies.
- July 15, 2014 – FCC opens up on Public Knowledge for public comments, received 1.1 million comments on the first day. Determined that "less than 1% of comments were clearly opposed to net neutrality."
- September 15, 2014 – FCC receives 3.7 million comments in total. “The FCC's server crashes again as millions more people, companies, and advocacy organizations weigh in on the open internet rules.”
- February 26, 2015 – FCC passes the Title II Net Neutrality Rules. “In a 3–2 party-line vote, the FCC passes open internet rules applying to both wired and wireless internet connections grounded in Title II authority.”
- June 12, 2015 – Net neutrality rules go into effect.
- June 14, 2016 – New rules are upheld by the United States Court of Appeals for the District of Columbia Circuit.
- January 23, 2017 – President Trump names Ajit Pai as new FCC chairman.
- April 26, 2017 – FCC Chairman Ajit Pai announces plan to reverse Title II regulations.
- May 1, 2017 – A U.S. appeals court declined to reconsider a rehearing of the FCC's net neutrality case.
- May 18, 2017 – The FCC voted 2–1 to start rolling back net neutrality regulations; this vote marked the beginning of a lengthy process required to modify the existing rules, and it did not actually change said rules.
- June 6, 2017 – Amazon, Reddit, Netflix and many other internet organizations announce that they will hold a simultaneous "Day of Action to Save Net Neutrality" on July 12 in a final attempt to convince the Republican-controlled FCC to keep the current net neutrality rules.
- July 12, 2017 – The net neutrality 'day of action' occurred, involving many major companies and the original founder of the Web, Tim Berners-Lee.
- July 17, 2017 – Comment Date for "Restoring Internet freedom" NPRM.
- August 30, 2017 – Reply Comment Date for "Restoring Internet freedom" NPRM.
- November 21, 2017 – FCC chairman Ajit Pai unveils plans to repeal the net neutrality policy in the United States. The five person FCC vote for repeal is scheduled for December 14, 2017.
- December 14, 2017 – The FCC votes 3 to 2, along party lines, in favor of reversing Title II regulations.
- February 22, 2018—The "Restoring Internet Freedom" ruling was published in the Federal Register, giving opponents of the FCC's decision 60 legislative days from that date to nullify it under the Congressional Review Act (CRA).
- March 5, 2018 – Washington State signs into law the first state Net Neutrality laws.
- May 16, 2018 – The US Senate passes CRA resolution on a 52–47 vote in an attempt to stop the repeal from going forward.
- June 11, 2018 – With the US House of Representatives failing to act under the CRA, the repeal of the FCC's rules took effect.
- September 30, 2018 – California passed regulations for Net Neutrality protections. The Trump administration swiftly filed a lawsuit stating that the regulations "interfere with the federal government's approach to the Internet."
- June 25, 2019 – Maine governor signs net neutrality bill. Bill states that internet service providers can only receive state funding if they "agree to provide net neutral service."
- October 2, 2019 – California governor signs bill AB-1699. The bill allows first response agencies to request, that mobile service providers not limit, or degrade, internet traffic of accounts used by the agency in response to emergencies.
- October 27, 2020 – The Federal Communications Commission (FCC) votes 3–2 to reaffirm the rolling back of net neutrality regulations.
- February 8, 2021 – The U.S. Justice Department dropped its legal challenge to California's net neutrality statute.

== Violations ==
Many broadband operators imposed various contractual limits on the activities of their subscribers. In the best known examples, Cox Cable disciplined users of virtual private networks (VPNs) and AT&T, as a cable operator, warned customers that using a Wi-Fi service for home networking constituted "theft of service" and a federal crime. Comcast blocked ports of VPNs, forcing the state of Washington, for example, to contract with telecommunications providers to ensure that its employees had access to unimpeded broadband for remote work. Other broadband providers proposed to start charging service and content providers in return for higher levels of service (higher network priority, faster or more predictable), creating what is known as a tiered Internet.

In 2005, North Carolina ISP Madison River Communications blocked the voice-over-internet protocol (VOIP) service Vonage. The FCC issued a Letter of Inquiry to Madison River, initiating an investigation. To avoid litigation, Madison River agreed to make a voluntary payment of fifteen thousand dollars and agreed to not block ports used for VoIP applications or otherwise prevent customers from using VoIP applications. According to the consent decree, "The Parties agree that this Consent Decree does not constitute either an adjudication on the merits or a factual or legal finding regarding any compliance or noncompliance with the requirements of the Act and the Commission’s orders and rules. The Parties agree that this Consent Decree is for settlement purposes only."

In September 2012, a group of public interest organizations such as Free Press, Public Knowledge and the New America Foundation's Open Technology Institute filed a complaint with the FCC that AT&T was violating net neutrality rules by restricting use of Apple's video-conferencing application FaceTime on cellular networks to those who have a shared data plan on AT&T, excluding those with older, unlimited or tiered data plans. The FCC response noted that "Although this report does not attempt to engage in any legal interpretations of the Open Internet Order, we do note that the Order treats these mobile broadband networks differently from traditional fixed networks. While both fixed and mobile broadband providers must disclose their management practices, mobile broadband providers have greater latitude for blocking devices and applications (as long as they do not compete with the provider's own voice or video telephony services) and discriminating in how they serve traffic, in accordance with reasonable network-management practices."

== Attempted legislation ==
Arguments associated with net neutrality regulations came into prominence in mid-2002 with nine different bills introduced on this issue between 2006 and 2013. Industry officials say that these proposals would launch new rules and regulations for internet providers.

On October 22, 2009, Sen. McCain (R-AZ) introduced the “Internet Freedom Act of 2009” (S. 1836). The bill would prohibit the FCC from enacting rules that would regulate the Internet. In other words, the bill, if passed, would prevent the FCC from imposing network or “net” neutrality rules to the Internet. Specifically, the bill language states, “The FCC shall not propose, promulgate, or issue any regulations regarding the Internet or IP-enabled services. In other words, the bill, if passed, would prohibit the FCC from enacting rules that would regulate the Internet – or against net neutrality.

On January 5, 2011, two anti-net neutrality bills were introduced. The first bill was H.R. 96, The Internet Freedom Act, introduced by Rep. Blackburn (R-TN), with more than sixty cosponsors (all of whom are Republican). H.R. 96 strikes down the FCC's December 21 passage of its rule and order on net neutrality by asserting that regulation of the Internet is under the jurisdiction of Congress, not the FCC.

The second bill, H.R. 166, The Internet Investment, Innovation, and Competition Preservation Act – was introduced by Rep. Cliff Stearns (R-FL) and co-sponsored by Rep. Blackburn. The bill also seeks to prohibit the FCC from regulating the Internet or information services (i.e. imposing net neutrality rules) unless there is demonstrated market failure.

On January 25, 2011, The pro-net neutrality bill – S. 74, The Internet Freedom, Broadband Promotion, and Consumer Protection Act of 2011 – was introduced by Sen. Cantwell (D-WA) and co-sponsored by Sen. Franken (D-MN). The bill would codify the FCC's six net neutrality principles (which the ALA supported), outlined in a November 2009 FCC Notice of Proposed Rule Making (NPRM), among other things.

On September 30, 2018, the California Internet Consumer Protection and Net Neutrality Act of 2018 – SB-822 – was approved by California Gov. Jerry Brown. The bill would aim to bring back Obama-era net neutrality regulations that were repealed by the Trump administration.

== Positions ==
There has been extensive debate about whether net neutrality should be required by law in the United States. Debate over the issue predates the coining of the term. Advocates of net neutrality have raised concerns about the ability of broadband providers to use their last mile infrastructure to block Internet applications and content (e.g. websites, services, and protocols), and even to block out competitors. While opponents claim net neutrality regulations would deter investment into improving broadband infrastructure and try to fix something that isn't broken.

In 2014 Professor Susan Crawford, a legal and technology expert at Harvard Law School suggested that municipal broadband might be a possible solution to net neutrality concerns.

=== Support of net neutrality ===
Organizations that support net neutrality come from widely varied political backgrounds and include groups such as Consumer Reports, MoveOn.org, Free Press, Consumer Federation of America, AARP, American Library Association, Public Knowledge, the Media Access Project, the Christian Coalition, TechNet, the American Civil Liberties Union, the Electronic Frontier Foundation, Greenpeace, Tumblr, Kickstarter, Vimeo, Wikia, Mozilla Foundation, NEA, and others.

Prominent supporters of net neutrality include Vinton Cerf, co-inventor of the Internet Protocol; Tim Berners-Lee, creator of the World Wide Web; law professor Tim Wu; Netflix CEO Reed Hastings; Tumblr founder David Karp; Free Press President Craig Aaron; and Last Week Tonight host John Oliver, who presented two full-length Last Week Tonight segments about the issue. Other organizations that have voiced support for Net Neutrality are Facebook, Amazon, Microsoft, and Google. In December 2017 public opinion poll, 83% of voters supported keeping the rules on net neutrality, including 75% of Republican voters, 89% of Democratic voters, and 86% of independent voters.

Outside of the US, several countries have removed net neutrality protocols and have started double charging for delivering content (once to consumer and again to content providers). This equates to a toll being required for certain internet access, essentially limiting what is available to all people, in particular low income households.

Large, already well-established companies may not be harmed by cost increase that providers such as Comcast may levy upon them, but it may stifle small businesses and start-ups. Sites such as Facebook, Google, and Amazon may not have been able to thrive absent net neutrality.

Barbara Stripling, the president of the American Library Association states: "School, public and college libraries rely upon the public availability of open, affordable Internet access for school homework assignments, distance learning classes, e-government services, licensed databases, job-training videos, medical and scientific research, and many other essential services, we must ensure the same quality access to online educational content as to entertainment and other commercial offerings."

Previously existing FCC rules do not prevent telecommunications companies from charging fees to certain content providers in exchange for preferential treatment (the so-called "fast lanes"). Neutrality advocates Tim Wu and Lawrence Lessig have argued that the FCC does have regulatory power over the matter, following from the must-carry precedent set in the Supreme Court case Turner Broadcasting v. Federal Communications Commission.

Net neutrality proponents argue that telecom companies seek to impose a tiered service model in order to control the pipeline and thereby remove competition, create artificial scarcity, and oblige subscribers to buy their otherwise noncompetitive services. Many believe net neutrality to be primarily important for the preservation of current internet freedoms; a lack of net neutrality would allow Internet service providers, such as Comcast, to extract payment from content providers like Netflix, and these charges would ultimately be passed on to consumers.

Civil rights organizations, such as the Color of Change, the National Hispanic Media Coalition, and more argue that net neutrality is also important for communities of color because it allows for them to tell their own stories and “organize for racial and social justice." Much of the mainstream media does not showcase these minority people, so these organizations believe that it is important to open the Internet into giving these people some sort of broadcast station. By doing so, their voices can be heard, because beforehand ISPs could “block unpopular speech and prevent dissident voices from speaking freely online."

In May 2014, some websites admitted to inserting code that slowed user access to their site from known FCC IP addresses, as a protest on the FCC's position on net neutrality.

On his show Last Week Tonight, Oliver took on the issue of net neutrality for the first time in 2014, in the show's first season. The episode went viral with 13 million views on YouTube and prompted 45,000 comments on the FCC website. At the 2016 Consumer Electronics Show, former FCC Chairman Tom Wheeler cited Oliver's episode as a turning point in the issue of net neutrality. “John Oliver took the ultimate arcane issue, Title II, and made it something that got people interested. And that’s good.” Oliver returned to the issue of net neutrality on his May 7, 2017, episode in response to Chairman Pai's promise to get rid of the regulation. He prompted viewers to once again comment on the FCC website by buying the domain gofccyourself.com, which garnered 1.6 million contributions.

Some have referenced the advance of Elon Musk's Starlink as something that could undercut the lobbying power of cable companies by offering internet access via satellite as opposed to traditional wired or wireless technologies.

Some rural areas would have much less or no connectivity without net neutrality, making the use of farm software impracticable or impossible.

=== Opposition to net neutrality ===
Individuals against net neutrality include former FCC Commissioner Ajit Pai, Daniel Berninger and Jeff Pulver, Marc Andreessen, Robert Kahn, Peter Thiel, MIT Media Lab founder Nicholas Negroponte, Internet engineer and former Chief Technologist for the FCC David Farber, and Nobel Prize economist Gary Becker.

Nonprofit organizations opposed to net neutrality include FreedomWorks, the Reason Foundation, and Citizens Against Government Waste.

Organizations and companies that oppose net neutrality regulations include several major technology hardware companies, cable and telecommunications companies, hundreds of small internet service providers, various think tanks, several civil rights groups, and others.

Companies such as Verizon, AT&T, and Comcast are some of the biggest opponents to net neutrality. In fact, since 2005 these companies have lobbied three times as much in opposition to net neutrality as the likes of Google and Microsoft have lobbied for it. The statistics show that from 2005 to 2013, anti-neutrality companies filed 427 reports to lobby against net-neutrality, compared to just 176 reports filed by those for it.

Opponents argue that net neutrality would benefit industry lobbyists, and not consumers due to the potential of regulatory capture with policies that protect incumbent interests. Former hedge fund manager turned journalist Andy Kessler has argued, the threat of eminent domain against the telecommunication providers, instead of new legislation, is the best approach by forcing competition and better services. One print ad frames the Hands Off the Internet message in pro-consumer terms. "Net neutrality means consumers will be stuck paying more for their Internet access to cover the big online companies' share," the ad claims.

In November 2005, Edward Whitacre Jr., then chief executive officer of SBC Communications, stated "there's going to have to be some mechanism for these [Internet upstarts] who use these pipes to pay for the portion they're using", and that "The Internet can't be free in that sense, because we and the cable companies have made an investment," sparking a furious debate. SBC spokesman Michael Balmoris said that Whitacre was misinterpreted and his comments only referred to new tiered services. Net neutrality laws are generally opposed by the cable television and telephone industries.

Net neutrality opponents such as IBM, Intel, Juniper, Qualcomm, and Cisco claim that net neutrality would deter investment into broadband infrastructure, saying that "shifting to Title II means that instead of billions of broadband investment driving other sectors of the economy forward, any reduction in this spending will stifle growth across the entire economy. Title II is going to lead to a slowdown, if not a hold, in broadband build out, because if you don’t know that you can recover on your investment, you won’t make it." Others argue that the regulation is "a solution that won’t work to a problem that simply doesn’t exist".

Critics of net neutrality argue that data discrimination is desirable for reasons like guaranteeing quality of service. Bob Kahn, co-inventor of the Internet Protocol, called the term net neutrality a slogan and opposes establishing it, but he admits that he is against the fragmentation of the net whenever this becomes excluding to other participants. Vint Cerf, Kahn's co-founder of the Internet Protocol, explains the confusion over their positions on net neutrality, "There’s also some argument that says, well you have to treat every packet the same. That’s not what any of us said. Or you can’t charge more for more usage. We didn’t say that either."

=== Alternative FCC proposals ===
An alternate position was proposed in 2010 by then-FCC Commissioner Julius Genachowski, which would narrowly reclassify Internet access as a telecommunication service under Title Two of the Communications Act of 1934. It would apply only six common carrier rules under the legal principle of forbearance that would sufficiently prevent unreasonable discrimination and mandate reasonable net neutrality policies under the concept of common carriage. Incumbent ISP AT&T opposed the idea, saying that common carrier regulations would "cram today's broadband Internet access providers into an ill-fitting 20th century regulatory silo," while Google supported the FCC proposal: "In particular, the Third Way will promote legal certainty and regulatory predictability to spur investment, ensure that the Commission can fulfill the tremendous promise of the National Broadband Plan, and make it possible for the Commission to protect and serve all broadband users, including through meaningful enforcement."

In October 2014, after the initial proposal was shot down, the FCC began drafting a new proposal that would take a hybrid regulatory approach to the issue. Although this alternative has not yet been circulated, it is said to propose that there be a divide between "wholesale" and "retail" transactions. In order to illustrate clear rules that are grounded by law, reclassification of Title II of the Communications Act of 1934 will be involved as well as parts of Section 706 of the Telecommunications Act of 1996. Data being sent between content provider and ISPs will involve stricter regulations compared to transactions between ISP's and consumers, which will involve more lax parameters. Restrictions on offering a data fast lane will be enforced between content providers and ISPs to avoid unfair advantages. This hybrid proposal has become the most popular solution among the three options that FCC has reported. However, ISPs, such as AT&T who has already warned the public via tweet "any use of Title II would be problematic", are expected to dispute this solution. The official proposal was rumored to become public by the end of 2014.

=== Opinions cautioning against legislation ===
In 2006 Bram Cohen, the creator of BitTorrent, said "I most definitely do not want the Internet to become like television where there's actual censorship... however it is very difficult to actually create network neutrality laws which don't result in an absurdity, like making it so that ISPs can't drop spam or stop... attacks."

In June 2007, the US Federal Trade Commission (FTC) urged restraint with respect to new regulations proposed by net neutrality advocates, noting the "broadband industry is a relatively young and evolving one," and given no "significant market failure or demonstrated consumer harm from conduct by broadband providers" such regulations "may well have adverse effects on consumer welfare, despite the good intentions of their proponents." The FTC conclusions were questioned in Congress in September 2007, when Sen. Byron Dorgan, D-N.D., chairman of the Senate interstate commerce, trade and tourism subcommittee, told FTC Chairwoman Deborah Platt Majoras that he feared new services as groundbreaking as Google could not get started in a system with price discrimination.

In 2011 Aparna Watal, a legal officer at an Internet company named Atomic Labs, has put forward three points for resisting any urge "to react legislatively to the apparent regulatory crisis". Firstly, "contrary to the general opinion, the Comcast decision does not uproot the Commission's authority to regulate ISPs. Section 201(b) of the Act, which was cited as an argument by the Commission but not addressed by the Court on procedural grounds, could grant the Commission authority to regulate broadband Internet services where they render "charges, practices and regulations for, and in connection with" common carrier services unjust and unreasonable." Secondly, she suggests, it is "undesirable and premature to legislatively mandate network neutrality or for the Commission to adopt a paternalistic approach on the issue ... [as] there have been few overt incidents to date, and the costs of those incidents to consumers have been limited." She cites "prompt media attention and public backlash" as effective policing tools to prevent ISPs from throttling traffic. She suggests that it "would be more prudent to consider introducing modest consumer protection rules, such as requiring ISPs to disclose their network management practices and to allow for consumers to switch ISPs inexpensively, rather than introducing network neutrality laws." "While by regulating broadband services the commission is not directly regulating content and applications on the Internet", content will be affected by the reclassification. "The different layers of the Internet work in tandem with each other such that there is no possibility of throttling or improving one layer's performance without impacting the other layers. ... To let the Commission regulate broadband pipelines connecting to the Internet and disregard that it indirectly involves regulating the data that runs through them will lead to a complex, overlapping, and fractured regulatory landscape in the years to come."

== Unresolved issues ==
As of 2006 the debate over "neutrality" did not yet capture some dimensions of the topic; for example, whether voice packets should get higher priority than packets carrying email or whether emergency services, mission-critical, or life-saving applications, such as tele-medicine, should get priority over spam.

=== Alternatives to cable and DSL ===
Cable companies have lobbied Congress for a federal preemption to ban states and municipalities from competing and thereby interfering with interstate commerce. However, there is current Supreme Court precedent for an exception to the Commerce Power of Congress for states as states going into business for their citizens.

In 2006 it was proposed that neither municipal wireless nor other technological solutions such as encryption, onion routing, or time-shifting DVR would be sufficient to render possible discrimination moot.

=== Utility company restrictions ===
EPB, the municipal utility serving Chattanooga, Tennessee, petitioned the FCC to allow them to deliver internet to communities outside of the 600-square mile area that they service. A similar petition was made by Wilson, North Carolina. According to FCC officials, some residents who lived just outside the service areas of the Chattanooga and Wilson utilities then had no broadband service available. One of the two February 26, 2015, rulings set aside those states' restrictions on municipal broadband, although legal challenges to the FCC's authority to do so were seen as likely.

== State-level actions ==
Individual states have taken action to generally uphold net neutrality either through proposed legislation or through by requiring state agencies to establish contracts with Internet providers that offer net neutral-services. The status as of February 26, 2018, of executive orders and pending action at state levels is summarized as follows:

Entity	Executive order	Suing the FCC	Other action	State bill number	Description	Current status
Alaska			2018-01-12	HB277	regulation	
Alaska			2018-01-24	SJRes 12	resolution	
Alaska			2018-01-24	SB 160	regulation	
California		2018-01-16	2018-09-30	SB-822	California Internet Consumer Protection and Net Neutrality Act of 2018	While still under litigation, enforcement of law has been granted by court as of February 2021.
California		2018-01-16	2018-01-22	SB-460	state contracts	
Colorado			2019-01-14	SB19-078	regulation	enacted
Connecticut		2018-01-16	2017-12-29		draft legislation	
Delaware		2018-01-16				
District of Columbia		2018-01-16				
Georgia			2017-12-18	SB 310	regulation	
Hawaii		2018-01-16	2017-12-18		draft legislation	
Illinois		2018-01-16	2018-01-11		draft legislation	
Iowa		2018-01-16	2018-02-01		draft legislation	
Kansas			2018-02-07	HB 2682	state contracts	
Kentucky		2018-01-16				
Maine		2018-01-16				
Maryland		2018-01-16				
Massachusetts		2018-01-16	2017-12-19	SD.2428	regulation	
Massachusetts		2018-01-16	2018-02-06		hearing	
Minnesota		2018-01-16	2017-12-19		draft legislation	
Mississippi		2018-01-16				
Montana	2018-01-22					
Nebraska			2018-01-05	Legislative Bill 856	regulation	
New Jersey	2018-02-05	2018-02-05	2017-12-04	A.5257	monitoring	
New Mexico		2018-01-16	2017-12-21	SB 39	regulation	
New Mexico		2018-01-16	2018-01-23	SB 155	regulation	
New York	2018-01-24	2018-01-16	2018-01-03	S07175	state contracts	
New York	2018-01-24	2018-01-16	2018-01-03	S07183	state & local contracts	
New York	2018-01-24	2018-01-16	2017-12-22	S08882	state & local contracts	
New York	2018-01-24	2018-01-16	2018-01-18	A09057	state & local contracts	
New York	2018-01-24	2018-01-16	2017-01-17	A01958	regulation	
North Carolina		2018-01-16	2018-01-11		draft legislation	
Oregon		2018-01-16	2018-01-21		ballot initiative drive	
Pennsylvania		2018-01-16	2018-01-26		possible executive order	
Pennsylvania		2018-01-16	2018-02-09	SB 1033	state & local contracts	
Rhode Island		2018-01-16	2018-01-10	H 7076	state & local contracts	
Rhode Island		2018-01-16	2018-01-11	S 2008	state & local contracts	
South Dakota			2018-02-06	SB 195	state contracts	
Tennessee			2018-01-23	SB 1756	state & local contracts	
Tennessee			2018-01-23	HB 1755	state & local contracts	
Vermont	2018-02-15	2018-01-16	2018-01-31	H.680	state contracts	Enforcement of law, and legal challenge of law voluntarily halted until completion of states' legal case against FCC.
Virginia		2018-01-16	2018-01-09	HB 705	regulation(failed)	
Washington (state)		2018-01-16	2017-12-13	HB 2282	regulation	
Washington (state)		2018-01-16	2017-12-14	HB 2284	regulation	
Washington (state)		2018-01-16	2018-01-17	SB 6446	state contracts	
Wisconsin			2018-01-25		draft legislation	

== See also ==
- Commercialization of the Internet
- Economic rent
- Municipal broadband
- Series of tubes

== Notes ==
- "Nearly two dozen attorneys general sue to block FCC's repeal of net neutrality rules", USA Today, Associated Press, 2018-01-16
- Attorneys general for 21 states and the District of Columbia (2018-01-16), Protective Petition for Review, Case No. 18-1013 (PDF), Attorney General of the State of New York, "State of New York, State of California, State of Connecticut, State of Delaware, State of Hawaii, State of Illinois, State of Iowa, Commonwealth of Kentucky, State of Maine, State of Maryland, Commonwealth of Massachusetts, State of Minnesota, State of Mississippi, State of New Mexico, State of North Carolina, State of Oregon, Commonwealth of Pennsylvania, State of Rhode Island, State of Vermont, Commonwealth of Virginia, State of Washington, and the District of Columbia Petitioners, v. Federal Communications Commission, and United States of America, Respondents."
- FCC Restoring Internet Freedom Order (2018): Declaratory ruling, report, and order in the matter of restoring Internet freedom (PDF), U.S. Federal Communications Commission, 2018-01-04
- Fight for the Future (2018), These states are fighting for net neutrality. Is yours one of them?
- Kang, Cecilia (2018-01-11), "States Push Back After Net Neutrality Repeal", New York Times, "Lawmakers in at least six states, including California and New York, have introduced bills in recent weeks that would forbid internet providers to block or slow down sites or online services. Legislators in several other states, including North Carolina and Illinois, are weighing similar action. ... Bills have also been introduced in Massachusetts, Nebraska, Rhode Island and Washington."
- Net Neutrality Legislation in States, National Conference of State Legislatures, 2019-01-23
