= Day of Action to Save Net Neutrality =

2017 online rights protest

The Day of Action to Save Net Neutrality was an event on July 12, 2017, in which various organizations and individuals advocated for net neutrality in the United States. The event was a response to plans by Federal Communications Commission chairman Ajit Pai to end United States government policies which establish net neutrality. Over 50,000 websites, including many organizations, contributed activism after Fight for the Future, Demand Progress, and Free Press convened the event. The group called it "the largest online protest in history", a term which had previously referred to protests against Internet censorship in 2012.

== Goals ==
The event sought to contact members of Congress and the FCC. The protest noted that Ajit V. Pai formerly worked at Verizon, a company which opposes net neutrality.

== Participants ==
- Amazon
- American Civil Liberties Union
- American Library Association
- AT&T
- Bittorrent Inc.
- Center for Media Justice
- Cracked.com
- CREDO Mobile
- Demand Progress
- DeviantArt
- Discord
- Dreamhost
- Etsy
- Facebook
- GitHub
- Google
- Greenpeace
- Kickstarter
- Kink.com
- MoveOn.org
- Mozilla Foundation
- Netflix
- Nextdoor
- Organizing for Action
- Pantheon Systems
- Patreon
- plug.dj
- Pornhub
- Private Internet Access
- Reddit
- RedTube
- Shapeways
- Spotify
- Stack Exchange
- Tumblr
- Twitter
- Vimeo
- xHamster
- Y Combinator
- Zombo.com

Netflix CEO Reed Hastings publicly stated that net neutrality was no longer a primary concern for Netflix and that it would not participate. Netflix later reversed their position and decided to support the campaign. Prior to the Day of Action there was speculation Tumblr would not participate after Verizon acquired their parent company, Yahoo!. Tumblr would in fact be a noted participant, with their logo featured prominently on Battle for the Net's website along with other major supporters.

== Reactions ==
Wired commented that the activism was a result of opposing sides of large organizations, with traditional telecom organizations as the target of protest and new media organizations as the protestors. Recode criticized companies such as Facebook and Google for holding back and posting messages that were unlikely to reach a large fraction of their users.

In response to the protest, some of the targeted ISPs stated that they supported the spirit of net neutrality but not the specific regulations passed in 2010 and 2015. Comcast called them "outdated" and Verizon called them "1930s style". Despite AT&T's opposition to net neutrality rules, a statement on the company webpage stated that it was "joining" the protest. AT&T's participation was rejected by the principal organizers of the event.

== See also ==
- Internet activism
- Protests against SOPA and PIPA
