= Net Neutrality II =

- Last Week Tonight with John Oliver segment
- Episode no.: Season 4 Episode 11 (segment)
- Presented by: John Oliver
- Original air date: May 7, 2017
- Running time: 19 minutes

"Net Neutrality II" is the second segment of the HBO news satire television series Last Week Tonight with John Oliver devoted to net neutrality in the United States. It aired on May 7, 2017, for 19 minutes, as part of the eleventh episode of the fourth season, and the 100th episode overall.

During this segment, comedian John Oliver discusses the threat to net neutrality. Under the previous administration of President Barack Obama, the Federal Communications Commission (FCC) was considering two options for net neutrality in early 2014, which Oliver covered in a previous segment entitled "Net Neutrality". The FCC proposed permitting fast and slow broadband lanes, which would compromise net neutrality, but was also considering reclassifying broadband as a telecommunication service, which would preserve net neutrality. After a surge of comments supporting net neutrality that were inspired by Oliver's episode, the FCC voted to reclassify broadband as a utility in 2015.

The second episode dealt with a resurgence of the same problem, except under the administration of Donald Trump. The FCC was proposing to eliminate the 2015 rules that classified broadband as a utility, thereby allowing the implementation of slow and fast lanes. Despite another surge of comments following the second episode, the FCC proceeded with its plans to eliminate the 2015 regulations.

== Plot ==
External videos
- Last Week Tonight with John Oliver: Net Neutrality II (HBO) on YouTube

Oliver recaps his previous "Net Neutrality" episode and its aftermath. Afterward, Oliver describes the reason for his second episode: the Trump administration is rolling back Obama-era regulations, including Wheeler's net-neutrality rules. The comedian says, "I genuinely would not be surprised if one night Trump went on TV just to tell us that he personally killed every [Thanksgiving] turkey Obama ever pardoned".

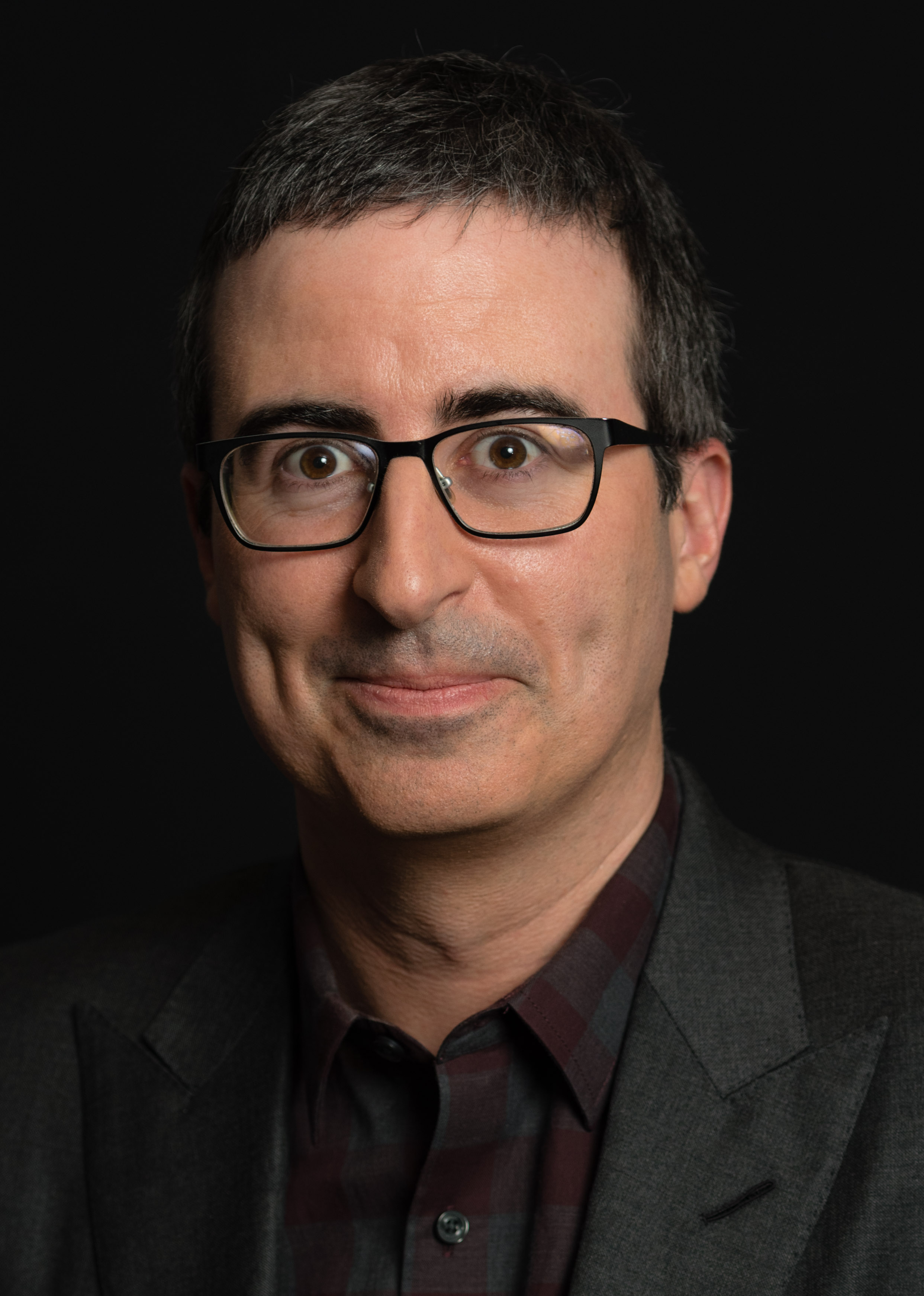
John Oliver (pictured in 2016), the host of Last Week Tonight

Oliver shows a clip of YouTube personality Tay Zonday, who summarizes the concept of net neutrality. Zonday says that under net neutrality laws, ISPs have to treat all web traffic the same, and as an example, he says that an ISP cannot favor one search engine by slowing down traffic that uses other search engines. After the clip ends, Oliver paraphrases what Zonday just said: that under the concept of net neutrality, ISPs cannot impact or restrict people's online actions, and big companies cannot prevent competition from small companies. Oliver says that in the case of the latter, "Ancestry.com could easily crush my new site JustTellMeIfImRelatedToANazi.com. It's like ancestry.com except you get to skip all the bullshit." He then notes that major ISPs like Charter, Cox, and Comcast have all published statements that endorsed "a free and open internet", and that Verizon even made a video explaining that the change would "put the open Internet rules in an enforceable way on a different legal footing".

The comedian next explains Titles I and II of the Communications Act of 1934; the ruling provided by Comcast v. FCC; and Pai's appointment by President Trump. Oliver says that based on this context, Verizon's bid for a "different legal footing" was akin to "O. J. Simpson asking why you won't let him hold any of your samurai swords". He continues that the new FCC chairman's promise that the current rules' "days were numbered" and his vow to "take a weed whacker" to the current rules was like "serial killer talk". Pai's easygoing attitude, casual quotations of The Big Lebowski on his Twitter account, and affinity for his large Reese's-branded coffee mug made him personable, and according to Oliver, even more dangerous. Oliver says that Pai is a former lawyer for Verizon who has said that "we were not living in some digital dystopia before the partisan imposition of a massive plan hatched in Washington saved all of us", to which the comedian adds, "Except for Pizza Rat".

Oliver then takes a serious tone, saying that reclassification of ISPs was the only way to regulate them, and points out that Pai had erroneously said that there is no evidence of throttling by cable companies. Oliver refutes Pai's statement with a Bloomberg News article about how Verizon, AT&T, and T-Mobile had blocked their respective subscribers from accessing Google Wallet on their phones because it competed with their Isis Mobile Wallet service.

The comedian says that Pai has also proposed "laughably lacking" alternatives to net neutrality. One alternative stipulated that ISPs simply include a voluntary statement in their terms of service indicating that they would not throttle or block content, which Oliver says would "make net neutrality as binding as a proposal on The Bachelor". Pai's other rationales for reclassifying ISPs was that the new rules already resulted in decreased investment in broadband networks. Brian Schatz, a Democratic U.S. Senator representing Hawaii and the ranking member of the Senate Commerce Subcommittee on Communications, Technology, Innovation, and the Internet, said that Pai's claim of decreased investment was untrue. Oliver then quotes a 2014 phone call from Francis J. Shammo, the chief financial officer of Verizon, in which the latter says that the new net-neutrality rules did not affect Verizon's business. Oliver says, "that doesn't really sound like net neutrality was jeopardizing investment at all".

The ISPs' position on the net neutrality issue is that protections could be retained by an Act of Congress, but Oliver says that he does not trust Congress to go through. He also expresses distrust of President Trump, who had claimed that Obama's net-neutrality protections would "target conservative media", when in fact, that could only be achieved by the opposite scenario: a lack of net-neutrality protections. At the end of the segment, Oliver urges viewers to go to GoFCCYourself.com, a website redirecting to the specific FCC proposal. He says, "Every Internet group needs to come together like you successfully did three years ago … gamers; YouTube celebrities; Instagram models; Tom from MySpace, if you're still alive. We need all of you. You cannot say you are too busy when 540,000 of you commented on Beyonce's pregnancy announcement."

=== Web exclusive ===
External videos
- Last Week Tonight with John Oliver: Net Neutrality Update – Web Exclusive (HBO) on YouTube

In a segment posted only on YouTube the following week, Oliver talks about an update at the FCC. He describes how gofccyourself.com started trending on Twitter after the Net Neutrality II segment aired. Ultimately, the FCC website got 1.6 million extra comments as a result of the segment. Oliver shows a video of a news anchor describing this fact while using an image of Stephen Colbert, another comedian.

Oliver then reads off a comment from a person claiming to be from the International Space Station who complained about his porn website access being interrupted, to which he responds, "There is no one up there who has any use for porn, and I'll tell you why: they are way too busy space fucking". He also noted that several comments were using fake names like Homer Simpson, Barack Obama, and Michael Jackson, then said that "Michael Jackson" is a very common name, although one commenter writing under that name had listed an address of "420 Buthole st"—a reference to cannabis culture and posteriors. Oliver describes that some media had doubts about this net-neutrality drive, with one news anchor alleging that there were 128,000 spambot comments with fake names. He then says that some of the comments were racist, saying, "Let me just say, if any of those came from anyone who watches this show, stop it! Writing racist things on the Internet is not how you win the net neutrality debate, it's how you win the presidency." The comedian concludes by calling on viewers to refrain from adding any more comments, since the FCC stopped taking any comments a week before their May 18 vote on the issue.

== Effects and reception ==
Oliver's segment was thought to have caused viewers to submit an extra 150,000 comments on the net neutrality proposal. As with the previous "Net Neutrality" segment, the FCC site was thought to have crashed temporarily as a result of the surge in commenting. However, the FCC later stated that the site was unavailable due to distributed denial-of-service (DDoS) attacks that were unrelated to the Oliver segments. HBO also denied having initiated the DDoS attacks. Engadget noted that apart from the specific page about the net-neutrality proposal, the rest of the FCC site was working at normal speeds. Several Congressional Democrats doubted that the cause of the FCC website's outage was a DDoS attack, and they called on the FCC to investigate the issue. BuzzFeed journalist Kevin Collier filed a lawsuit against the FCC after it refused to publish data related to the outage under the Freedom of Information Act.

In response to the segment, Ajit Pai made a video in which he read and responded to mean tweets about himself in the style of a Jimmy Kimmel Live! "Mean Tweets" segment. Pai read several tweets that mentioned several things that John Oliver had talked about in "Net Neutrality II", such as The Big Lebowski quotes and the Reese's mug, but he did not read any tweets referring to net neutrality itself. Gizmodo criticized Pai's video, saying that he refused to debate Oliver's points and instead "addresses a bunch of Twitter eggs", anonymous user profiles, "with the implication that anyone who opposes his cash grab for corporations is a moron".

=== Commenting period closes and FCC votes ===
As a result of the surge in comments, the public commenting period was extended by two weeks to August 30. A poll in mid-August found that 60% of Americans supported the rules while 17% opposed them. The ratio of support was consistent for voters from both the Democratic and Republican parties.

By the time the commenting period closed, the FCC had received 22 million comments on the issue, which was the highest number of comments for any FCC proposal to date. However, this included over 1 million comments from a spambot, most of which were made in support of the proposal to repeal net neutrality. One estimate placed the total number of fake comments in excess of 7 million, using variations from seven email templates. The fake emails used duplicate and temporary email addresses, submitted under names such as "The Internet", and at one point, 500,000 comments were sent in the span of a single second. Because the legitimacy of so many of the comments was questioned, the FCC considered disregarding every comment. Following this revelation, Pai refused to investigate the fake comments, so New York Attorney General Eric Schneiderman set up his own webpage to help the public determine whether their names and information were used in any of the fake comments.

Despite the 22 million comments, the FCC announced plans to repeal net neutrality anyway in November 2017. After this announcement, several news media made references to the John Oliver segments about the issue. On December 14, 2017, the FCC voted in favor of repealing these policies.
