= Net Neutrality (Last Week Tonight with John Oliver) =

- Last Week Tonight with John Oliver segment
- Episode no.: Season 1 Episode 5 (segment)
- Presented by: John Oliver
- Original air date: June 1, 2014
- Running time: 13 minutes

"Net Neutrality" is the first segment devoted to net neutrality in the United States of the HBO news satire television series Last Week Tonight with John Oliver. It aired for 13 minutes on June 1, 2014, as part of the fifth episode of Last Week Tonight's first season.

During this segment, as well Oliver's follow-up segment entitled "Net Neutrality II", comedian John Oliver discusses the threats to net neutrality. Under the administration of President Barack Obama, the Federal Communications Commission (FCC) was considering two options for net neutrality in early 2014. The FCC proposed permitting fast and slow broadband lanes, which would compromise net neutrality, but was also considering reclassifying broadband as a telecommunication service, which would preserve net neutrality. After a surge of comments supporting net neutrality that were inspired by Oliver's episode, the FCC voted to reclassify broadband as a utility in 2015.

== Context ==
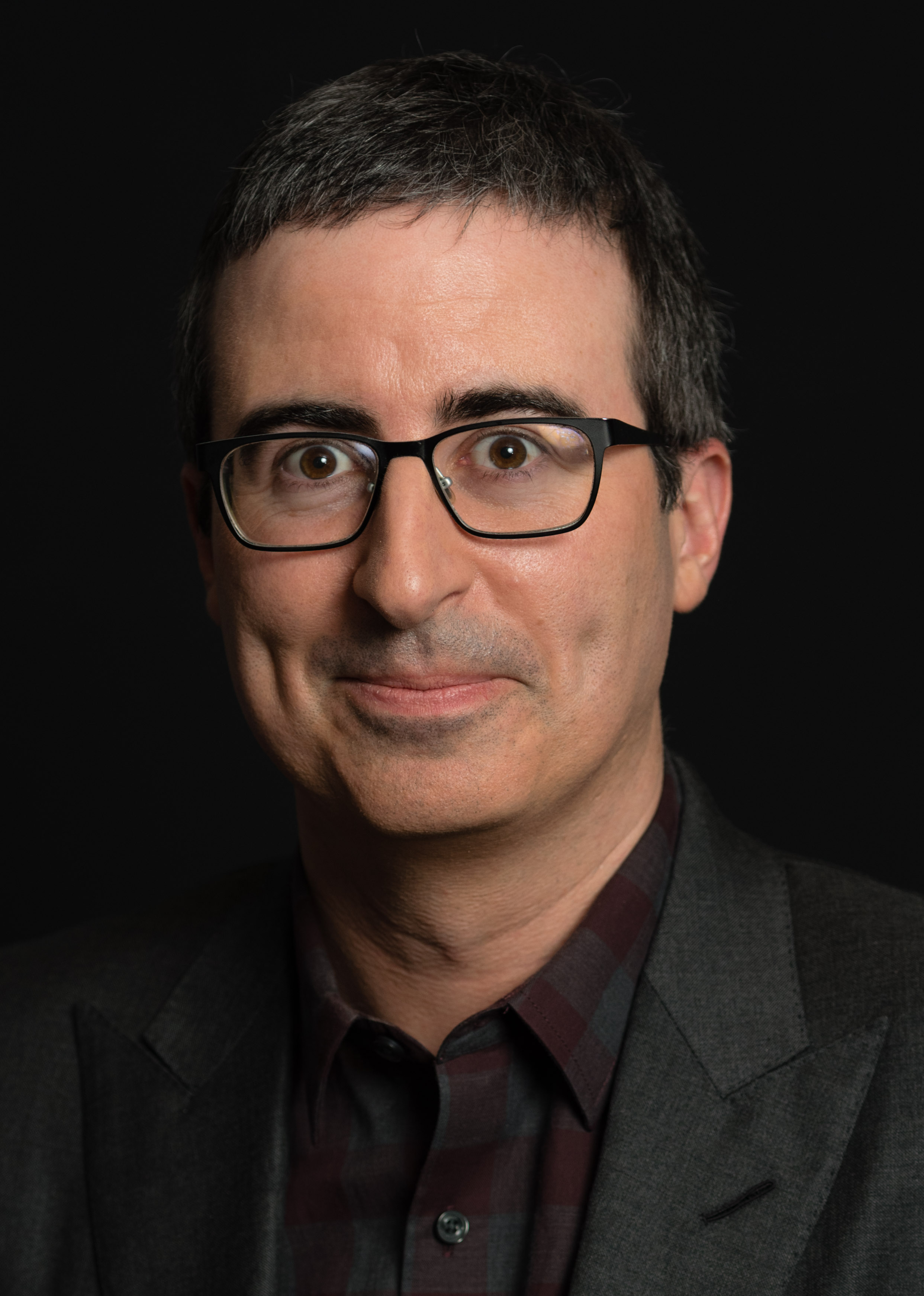
John Oliver (pictured in 2016), the host of Last Week Tonight

=== Last Week Tonight ===
Prior to the 2014 segment about net neutrality, Last Week Tonight had only aired four episodes, all of which were complex investigations of obscure problems. Bloomberg News called Last Week Tonight's approach "hardly a tried-and-true recipe for TV success." The late New York Times columnist David Carr commented that prior to the net neutrality segment, he thought Oliver's comedic style would "never work."

=== 2014 fast-lane proposal ===
In January 2014, the United States Circuit Court of the District of Columbia provided a ruling in the case of Verizon v. FCC, in which Verizon Communications, an internet service provider (ISP), sued the Federal Communications Commission for violating its rights under the United States Constitution. The FCC had passed the Open Internet Order in 2010 following the outcome of Comcast Corp. v. FCC, where it was found that the FCC could not censure Comcast's interference with their customers' peer-to-peer traffic. The order was meant as a further step toward ensuring net neutrality in the sense that ISPs could not block or discriminate against lawfully operated websites, apps, or web services. The ruling in Verizon v. FCC was that the FCC could not enforce net neutrality rules as long as service providers were not identified as "common carriers". However, the FCC was given permission to regulate broadband and craft more specific rules that stop short of identifying service providers as common carriers.

The ruling created a dispute as to whether net neutrality could be guaranteed under existing law, or if reclassification of ISPs was needed to ensure net neutrality. FCC chair Tom Wheeler stated that the FCC had the authority under Section 706 of the Telecommunications Act of 1996 to regulate ISPs. However, others including President Barack Obama supported reclassifying ISPs using the Communications Act of 1934. Their reclassification would move ISPs from being a general provision, which fell under the act's Title I, to a common carrier, which fell under the act's Title II. Critics of Section 706 pointed out that the section has no clear mandate to guarantee equal access to content provided over the internet, while subsection 202(a) of the Communications Act stated that common carriers cannot "make any unjust or unreasonable discrimination in charges, practices, classifications, regulations, facilities, or services." Advocates of net neutrality generally supported reclassifying ISPs under Title II, while FCC leadership and ISPs generally opposed such reclassification. The FCC stated that if they reclassified ISPs as common carriers, the commission would selectively enforce Title II, so that only sections relating to broadband would apply to ISPs.

In April 2014, the FCC proposed a set of new regulations that, among other things, would allow for ISPs to levy charges on websites in exchange for faster connection speeds. The "fast lane", as the proposal was called, would prioritize that website's internet connection over those of other websites that did not pay, although the ISP could not outright block web users from accessing websites that did not pay for "fast lanes". In addition, in enacting these "fast lanes", ISPs had to divulge whether they were promoting the content of sponsors or affiliates. This was at least the FCC's third attempt to create internet fast lanes. By May 2014, the FCC was considering two options: permitting fast and slow broadband lanes, thereby compromising net neutrality; or reclassifying broadband as a telecommunication service, thereby preserving net neutrality. Draft plans for the "fast-lane" option were approved, with three Democratic FCC commissioners voting to have the public review the proposal, and two Republican communications voting against public feedback.

The FCC's proposal was heavily criticized for its two-tier, preferential system, whose very core would go against the principle of net neutrality. The director of the Common Cause organization's Media and Democracy Reform Initiative compared the FCC proposal to "toll roads" that "represent Washington at its worst." A reporter for The Verge wrote that these regulations "would destroy net neutrality" precisely because it slowed down traffic. In response, Wheeler said that any statements saying that the proposed regulations would restrict the open Internet were "flat out wrong".'

== Episode ==
=== Description ===
Oliver delivered his 13-minute segment about net neutrality on June 1, 2014, as part of the show's main segment. He introduces the subject by praising "the internet, a.k.a. the electronic cat database," and noting how easy it is to buy merchandise such as coyote urine on the internet -{compared to if these items were bought in person. Oliver uses the coyote-urine analogy as a way to segue into a discussion of Wheeler's net-neutrality proposal. He pans "net neutrality" as a seemingly uninteresting topic, saying that videotaped FCC meetings about the issue might seem very boring "even by C-SPAN standards." Oliver then introduces the concept of net neutrality as something where all data is given the same priority regardless of its creator. He states that the Internet's relative equality, up to that point, had allowed startup companies to supersede bigger companies.

Oliver introduces the topic of how "the Internet is not broken, and the FCC is taking steps to fix that". The segment then displays some news clippings and broadcasts that explain the FCC's priority-lane proposal. Oliver returns onto the segment, and he protests vehemently against the proposed rules, jokingly stating that the rules would ensure "my startup video streaming service, Nutflix, a one-stop resource for videos of men getting hit in the nuts", would not be able to compete with larger companies like Netflix. He then takes a more serious approach, stating that the proposal would allow large ISPs such as Verizon and Comcast to buy the "fast-lane" data more easily compared to smaller ISPs with fewer funds. Oliver rebuts a telecommunication lawyer's claim that it would be a "fast-lane-versus-hyperspeed-lane" contrast, stating that the proposed rules were more comparable to Olympic gold medalist sprinter Usain Bolt versus "Usain bolted to an anchor".

The comedian refutes telecommunications companies' claims that they would not slow down other web traffic to get more internet users to subscribe to their services instead. Oliver points out an example in which Comcast slowed down Netflix download speeds in 2013 and 2014 unless Netflix paid Comcast a smooth-streaming fee. From October 2013 until Netflix finally agreed to pay in February 2014, Netflix download speeds for Comcast customers had slowed up to 25%, compared to on other ISPs where download speeds had consistently increased in the same time period. Oliver compared it to a "mob shakedown."

The comedian then says that the fight to keep net neutrality is so important that pro-net-neutrality activists are on the same side as corporations like Google, Netflix, Amazon, and Facebook, an alliance which Oliver describes as very unlikely. He compares this to Lex Luthor knocking on his nemesis Superman's apartment door for an offer to team up to "get rid of the asshole in apartment 3B". Oliver then says that the only entities that would benefit from the rule change were the cable companies who are lobbying Congress, including Comcast, who is the second-largest congressional lobbyist. Oliver says that President Barack Obama had been seen golfing with Comcast's CEO Brian Roberts, as well as invited Roberts to a fundraiser dinner. He also states that Obama's nomination of Tom Wheeler, a former cable and wireless lobbyist, for the FCC Chairman position was "the equivalent of needing a babysitter and hiring a dingo".

Oliver cites a 2010 FCC report on broadband, and says that 96% of Americans have at most two cable broadband providers to choose from. The segment then displays a clip of Roberts saying that if Comcast were to merge with another major ISP like Time Warner, there would be no reduction in competition. Oliver responds, "you could not be describing a monopoly more clearly if you were wearing a metal top hat", a player token used in the game Monopoly. Then the segment shows a graphic of Ookla Speed Test that shows a list of countries, sorted by their average broadband speed. The U.S., ranking 31st on the list, had an average speed slower than Estonia, a country Oliver described as "still worried about Shrek attacks". Oliver goes on to point out that Comcast and Time Warner had the lowest customer satisfaction ratings of any corporation in America, according to the quarterly American Customer Satisfaction Index that was released two weeks prior to the segment. He says that ISPs were not being truthful when they said they are committed to an open internet, and that representatives for the ISPs describe their plans in such a boring way that it goes unnoticed by many Americans. Oliver quips, "The cable companies have figured out the great truth of America: if you want to do something evil, put it inside something boring", comparing it to Apple Inc. putting Mein Kampf inside their user agreement.

At the end of the segment, Oliver displays the web address for the FCC's comment section. He delivers an exhortation toward "the Internet commenters out there", saying that "we need you to get out there and, for once in your life, focus your indiscriminate rage in a useful direction. Seize your moment, my lovely trolls, turn on caps lock, and fly my pretties! Fly! Fly!"

=== Aftermath ===
The segment received 800,000 views on YouTube in two days, while the TV broadcast saw over 1 million views. The segment was thought to spur over 45,000 comments on the FCC's electronic filing page about the net neutrality proposal. The FCC also received an extra 300,000 comments in an email inbox designated specifically for the proposal. By comparison, the proposal with the second highest number of comments had 2,000 such responses. The day after the episode, the FCC comment page experienced a surge in traffic. Shortly after the first segment aired, the FCC website crashed, and Last Week Tonight viewers noted that the website's commenting function was not working. A spokeswoman for the FCC said that it was "unclear if the high volume was directly related to the John Oliver segment".

Bloomberg News wrote that even though the segment was only a small part of the net-neutrality debate, as compared to the electronic mailing lists convincing tens of millions of people to vote against the proposed rules, it "gave a bump to a political movement" and ultimately helped to reverse the FCC's position in regards to net neutrality. Soraya Nadia McDonald of The Washington Post stated that Oliver "may be just the firebrand activist we’re looking for" in regards to the net-neutrality debate. Terrance F. Ross of The Atlantic wrote, "John Oliver’s segment on net neutrality this past June perfectly summed up what his HBO show Last Week Tonight is so good at: transcending apathy."

Not all commentators had positive reviews of the segment. Jon Healey of the Los Angeles Times wrote that "Oliver misled his audience badly on a couple of key points", saying that the federal courts would not allow the FCC to unfairly discriminate between different forms of web traffic; that large ISPs would not need the new rules to implement a speed-tiered system; and that Wheeler had left open the possibility of outlawing the ISPs' promotion of certain websites for a fee. He stated that in the case of Netflix versus Comcast, the problem had been a third-party transit provider who had argued with Comcast over the price and amount of data that the ISP would provide. Robert McMillan of Wired said that "complaints about a fast-lane don't make much sense" because large websites like Google and Facebook already benefited from "fast lanes", albeit in the form of large servers embedded in the ISPs' Internet exchange points. He wrote that instead of advocating against a change that had already occurred, internet users should look for ways to increase ISPs' competitiveness.

Chairman Wheeler himself responded to the segment, praising it as "creative" but saying "I am not a dingo". Wheeler said, "I think that it represents the high level of interest that exists in the topic in the country, and that's good." However, he also stated that the segment did not talk about the FCC's plan to reinstate the open-internet protections that had been halted in an appeals court earlier that year.

The University of Delaware's Center for Political Communication conducted a study in which it concluded that viewers of late-night shows were generally more informed about the net neutrality issue than regular cable news viewers. The study found that knowledge of the net neutrality debate was highest among Last Week Tonight viewers and lowest among Fox News viewers. According to the study, 74% of Last Week Tonight watchers heard about net neutrality, of which 29% heard "a lot" about the issue, compared to 52% of Fox News watchers, only 7% of which heard "a lot".

The "Net Neutrality" segment increased Last Week Tonight's viewership to approximately 4 million per episode by the end of the first season, and contributed to its popularity in U.S. late-night television. In November 2014, after the season had ended, David Carr of The New York Times wrote that the show had become "a smash" since the segment first aired. Carr stated that the "Net Neutrality" segment had helped convince FCC leadership to support net neutrality.

=== Effect on net-neutrality debate ===
In September 2014, the Pew Research Center found that the FCC filing page received 3,076 comments the week before the June 1 segment, and that there were another 79,838 comments posted the week immediately afterward. Google searches for the term "net neutrality" rose in popularity that week compared to the previous and following weeks. Two interns analyzing the data for the Pew Research Center wrote that the sudden rise in the number of comments on the FCC net-neutrality page could not be attributed to cable or printed news media, since these outlets' coverage of net neutrality was more infrequent than in previous weeks. Ultimately, less than 1 percent of the proposal's total 800,000 comments could be classified as "clearly opposed to net neutrality", with the majority either indicating support, taking no particular position, or being irrelevant comments.

The Verge later requested that the FCC publish emails related to the Last Week Tonight episode under the Freedom of Information Act. Of the emails that were released, most were positively critical of the video. In one exchange, a CBS executive sent a link to FCC employees, who joked about "Nutflix" and Usain Bolt. One of the FCC employees said, "We had a good laugh about it. The cable companies... not so much." When one reporter satirically asked if Chairman Wheeler commented on the "dingo" quip, an FCC spokesperson said "Hey John, no, no comment on that" with a smiley emoticon. This prompted Oliver to create a subsequent video parodying the FCC's response.

A Twitter policy spokesman said, "We all agreed that John Oliver’s brilliant net neutrality segment explained a very complex policy issue in a simple, compelling way that had a wider reach than many expensive advocacy campaigns."

On February 26, 2015, the FCC voted to apply the "common carrier" designation of the Communications Act of 1934 and Section 706 of the Telecommunications act of 1996 to the internet. The decision was driven partly because most Americans only had one high-speed internet provider available in their areas. On the same day, the FCC also voted to preempt state laws in North Carolina and Tennessee that limited the ability of local governments in those states to provide broadband services to potential customers outside of their service areas. While the latter ruling affected only those two states, the FCC indicated that the agency would make similar rulings if it received petitions from localities in other states. In response to ISPs and opponents, FCC Chairman Wheeler said, "This is no more a plan to regulate the Internet than the First Amendment is a plan to regulate free speech. They both stand for the same concept." On March 12, 2015, the FCC released the specific details of its new net neutrality rules, which included prohibiting content blocking, slower connections to websites, and "fast and slow lanes". It was thought that Oliver's segment had a major role in the decision, which was the opposite of the FCC's original "lane" proposal. On April 13, 2015, the final rule was published.

=== Updates since "Net Neutrality" ===
After Donald Trump won the 2016 United States presidential election, he appointed Republican FCC board member Ajit Pai as chairman of the FCC. Pai announced proposals to scrap Title II shortly after his appointment on the grounds that higher regulation of the internet led to decreased business. This marked a turnaround from the previous FCC's position under Chairman Wheeler. In May 2017, the FCC successfully voted to proceed with a plan to remove the net neutrality rules enacted under the Obama administration. Like the 2014 proposal vote, this vote was also partisan, with one Democratic board member opposing the removal and two Republicans supporting it. The vote caused John Oliver to release a second segment on the subject three years later, entitled "Net Neutrality II".

== See also ==
- 2014 in American television
