= Net bias =

Counter-principle to net neutrality

Net bias (or network bias) is the counter-principle to net neutrality, which indicates differentiation or discrimination of price and the quality of content or applications on the Internet by ISPs. Similar terms include data discrimination, digital redlining, and network management.

Net bias occurs when an ISP drops packets or denies access based on artificially induced conditions such as simulating congestion or blocking packets, despite the fact that ample capacity exists to carry traffic. Examples (models) of net bias include tiered service (specialized service), metering, bandwidth throttling, and port blocking. These forms of net bias are achieved by technical advancements of the Internet Protocol.

The idea of net bias can arise from political and economic motivations and backgrounds, which create some concerns regarding data discrimination arising from political and economic interests. Non-discrimination means that one class of Internet customers may not be favored over another. According to this view, the Internet should continue "to operate in a nondiscriminatory manner, both in terms of how subscribers access and receive Internet transmitted services and how content and other service providers reach subscribers." Every internet user should have equal upload and download capabilities on every network.

== Net neutrality ==
The principle of equal treatment of traffic, called "Net Neutrality" by proponents, is not enshrined in law in the United States but is supported by some regulations. Most of the debate around the issue has centered on tentative plans, now postponed, by large Internet carriers to offer preferential treatment of traffic from certain content providers for a fee. Network neutrality is a set of rules that forbid network owners from discriminating against independent applications (instead of against competing ISPs, as with open access).

== Models of net bias ==
=== Tiered service (specialized service, bandwidth partitioning) ===
Tiered service is one of the strategies employed to change Internet pricing and involves an intent to have flexibility in quality of service (QoS) on the Internet. Tiered service allows ISPs to create and manage speed-related subscriber tiers. In other words, this model partitions bandwidth and provides different levels of peering requirements and offers transit clients different amounts of throughput. This model stems from the perception of technical and economic limitations in the broadband industry. As technology develops, the demand for faster and higher performance of communication networks and the customer demand for bandwidth-intensive services, such as streaming videos, have increased. These situations result in network congestion that is mainly driven by a small number of heavy users. Moreover, ISPs argue that existing flat-rate plans do not enable them to cover the additional cost required to manage heavier network traffic. Accordingly, this model may allow ISPs to reach different market segments with different data plans, targeting the different types of needs based on speed tiers, volume data caps, and other customizable conditions.

=== Metering ===
Metered service (also called pay-per-use) is another strategy utilized to change Internet pricing other than tiered service. This model represents a usage-based pricing scheme that charges users based on their packet usages. Metered service contrasts with the model of paying a flat fee on a recurring basis to have unlimited access to a given good or service. This metering scheme not only satisfies ISPs in terms of recovering cost, but also enables users to rethink their usage patterns with a price signal. This pricing plan can benefit low-volume users because metered service might create new and possibly lower price points for those users. On the other hand, research shows that price is the most important factor for users, among other factors such as Internet speed, which indicates that broadband users are price-sensitive. Price-sensitivity explains why few consumers like having to think about how much they are using the Internet. In addition, from the users' perspective, one study suggested that consumers might have far less tolerance for unsolicited advertising, spam emails, banner advertising, and third party users of throughput when they are required to consider the cost for the amount of traffic. However, from the ISPs' perspective, one study indicates that a usage-based pricing scheme does not cause ISPs' discrimination incentives against content providers because ISPs are able to gain sufficient profits for the network investment to meet market needs.

=== Bandwidth throttling ===
Bandwidth throttling is a tactic that allows information and telecommunication companies to regulate network traffic and control network congestion. This type of measure is viewed as a limitation on users' upload and download speeds (rates) of content. Comcast, one of the major ISPs, conducted bandwidth throttling on 49% of its customers who were using bandwidth for P2P file sharing. After Comcast's actions were exposed, the Federal Communications Commission (FCC) ordered the company to stop throttling on a large scale. In particular, this form of net bias frequently targets heavy mobile users who consume large amounts of content (packets), like unlimited data plans. Mobile companies such as AT&T and Verizon have their own throttling policy because they are sometimes required to limit users' traffic to maintain the quality of the entire network. Recently, however, throttling has become a controversial issue because some companies infringe upon this policy. For example, AT&T had to pay US$850 to one customer to compensate for slowing down data speeds because they violated the terms of unlimited smartphone data contracts. In response to these complaints from smartphone subscribers, AT&T announced that they would change their policy for unlimited data users.

=== Blocking (port blocking) ===
Port blocking includes the deliberate decision by ISPs to deny onward transmission of traffic, or delivery of traffic, to an intended recipient. ISPs do not have a legitimate reason to deny onward packet transmission to specific customers of other ISPs. The ISPs have contractually committed to carry any and all packets from the former ISP without regard for the identity and marketplace success of that ISP's customers (on a first-come, first-served basis). However, an ISP is more likely to have higher incentives for port blocking when the ISP is vertically and horizontally integrated because those integrated companies attempt to enhance the marketplace attractiveness of corporate affiliates. For example, AT&T blocked Voice over Internet Protocol (VoIP) because the company was concerned that the VoIP service might threaten its wireless and wired telephony service. Thus, an ISP can engage in port blocking for VoIP traffic when giving preference to an affiliated telephone company.

== Technical component for net bias ==
Technological advancements allowed these types of net bias to function, while the technology was not fully matured enough to apply new pricing or QoS schemes in the past. In other words, as network technologies develop, ISPs implemented technological innovations that can prioritize packets and meter them when faced with increasing bandwidth requirements, using systems to distinguish properties of data packets. Packet analysis enables ISPs to monitor the Internet traffic, and can be performed by a computer program or hardware component that intercepts and logs traffic passing over a digital network. There are many technologies for network management such as SNMP or NETCONF.

== Motivations ==
The idea of network flexibility in pricing, service provisioning, and QoS tends to be based on economic and political considerations. These considerations show that net bias (network flexibility) makes economic sense and may not violate a reasonable expectation of net neutrality.

=== Economic motivations ===
ISPs have been increasingly investing in the infrastructure necessary to transport the bits and packets that correspond to commercially successful content and services. As the Internet becomes more capable of covering most converged services, and those services require wide bandwidth, high QoS guarantees, and time-sensitivity, ISPs must make substantial investments to the network. Moreover, at the early stage of the Internet's appearance, ISPs were able to concentrate on "connectivity" over "cost" because the government supported the development of the Internet. However, as this support has been removed and ISPs have sought to recoup their investment, cost recovery has become substantially more important to ISPs. In addition, incumbent carriers like AT&T, whose business involves both the Internet and telephony service, needed the new powerful source of revenue because traditional telephony became less profitable and its market share declined. In this situation, the incumbent carriers recognize that the significant profits accrued by Internet content and application providers such as Google can bring carriers the new revenue streams they are seeking. Accordingly, some of the major ISPs believe that the best way to achieve their goals is through the partitioning of network bandwidth and the prioritizing of bitstreams by offering different QoS. Likewise, some researchers argue that these strategies could work, emphasizing that ISPs should have unregulated pricing freedom, which may lead to promoted innovation, risk tasking, and diverse services and features. In addition, Yoo pointed out that ISPs could offer undropped packets and timely packet delivery even under truly congested conditions when they have the option of offering a premium peak service. Professor Lawrence Lessig also indicates that consumer-tiering, which provides end users with different throughput speeds or permissible volume of traffic, could recoup infrastructure investments and create the necessary incentives for increased investment.

=== Political motivations ===
As the FCC has perceived the need to create more incentives for incumbent carriers to invest in broadband, the commission has taken apart the access requirements and pricing model that force incumbent carriers to offer services at a low rate through the Telecommunications Act of 1996. In addition, the FCC has removed the traditional regulatory burdens for common carriers that provide Internet access and services. These deregulatory initiatives have freed the carriers of having to share and interconnect facilities providing information services. Some proponents of net bias argue that ISPs do not have legal obligation to operate as common carriers and that the network's interconnection arrangements result from commercial necessity. Moreover, in terms of establishing the network's interconnection, ISPs argue that they used their resources to maintain and upgrade the network for customers, and so far popular websites have received a "free ride" from these resources. Advocates of net bias also propose lawful pricing. Network flexibility for pricing, interconnection, and QoS characterize the initiatives as lawful price discrimination that can provide consumers with greater flexibility and potentially lower bills for low-volume users. Advocates of net bias also argue that combining simple routing with superior service offers options that are no different from the multiple classes of service provided by most airlines or the qualitative difference between free and toll highways. Consequently, some experts contend that the option of offering network flexibility provides a means for consumers and carriers to utilize premium services.

=== Internet censorship ===
The concept of freedom of information has emerged in response to state sponsored monitoring, surveillance, and censorship of the Internet. Internet censorship includes the control or suppression of publishing or accessing information on the Internet. Data discrimination may also occur on a national level to censor political, 'immoral' or religious Internet content.

For example, China and Saudi Arabia both filter content on the Internet, preventing access to certain types of websites. Singapore has network blocks on more than 100 sites. In Britain, telecommunication companies block access to websites that depict sexually explicit images of children. In the United Arab Emirates as of 2006, Skype was being blocked. In Norway, some ISPs use a voluntary filter to censor websites that the police (Kripos) believe to contain images of abuse of children. Germany also blocks foreign sites for copyright and other reasons. In the U.S., public institutions (e.g. libraries and schools), by law, block material that is related to the exploitation of children, and 'obscene and pornographic' material, unless they do not receive funding. The network filters also block sites and material relating to women's health, gay and lesbian rights groups, and sexual education for teenagers.

== Concerns regarding discrimination ==
The Internet has been historically regarded as an open and "best effort" network. Internet routers must forward packets on a first-come, first-served basis without regard for the analysis of data or content inside the packet. This aspect of the Internet has increased its value, contributing not only to the quality of our lives, but also to economic growth around the globe. Based on these notions, forms of net bias have created some concerns regarding discrimination from economic and political perspectives. In other words, unreasonable net bias occurs when an ISP conducts a discrimination strategy against a specific type of packet without a reasonable and fair financial or operational justification.

=== Concerns about economic discrimination ===
Users enjoy the high level of value when they are able to access the Internet on an unmetered and flat-rate basis. Users can also obtain attractive content subsidized by advertisers who employ the flat-rate subscription option by adding to the downloaded packet payload. This value proposition provides users with the benefits of the Internet, emphasizing connectivity with less regard for cost-related concerns. Likewise, the positive network effect — which refers to the process whereby more and more people adopt a service or buy a good, and as a result users receive enjoyable benefits and additional users are attracted to the Internet — created by the spread of the Internet is substantially beneficial. In the Internet, interlinking hundreds and thousands of networks reduces transaction costs and brings a flood of free information to subscribers. However, if major ISPs can freely block and degrade specific traffic streams, there would be societal losses as the Internet becomes more expensive and less productive. Proponents of net bias contend that market-based Internet access achieves efficient outcomes, such as creating innovation incentives for ISPs to invest in building and expanding networks. Nevertheless, opponents of net bias claim that allowing price and service discrimination may ruin the value of the Internet and enable ISPs to shut out competitors or other stakeholders who are unwilling or unable to pay surcharges. In other words, when large or powerful ISPs place a disproportionate financial burden on small and less financially sound ISPs and their subscribers by using forms of net bias like port blocking or tiered services, they may exacerbate the digital divide that separates people with easy and robust Internet service access opportunities from those without. One consumer group, Free Press, calls attention to a number of disadvantages that specialized services (tiered services) may produce. This organization argues that any form of prioritization on the open Internet would bring enormous disadvantages in terms of innovation, competition, investment, consumer choice, and free speech because this permission may enable ISPs to choose specific content/applications with respect to their own interests and thereby destroy the nature and value of the today's open Internet. Free Press cautions that specialized services will result in unbalanced and unparalleled economic growth, which is utterly against the public interest.

==== Viewpoint of Pro-discrimination advocates ====
While a broad presumption pertaining to data discrimination is perceived censorship, those in favor of this practice claim that there are benefits. The ISPs are a business, and as such, "...correctly state that external, non-market driven constraints on their ability to price discriminate can adversely impact their incentive to invest in broadband infrastructure and their ability to recoup that investment." There are times when it could make sense, in the eyes of the ISPs, to give preference to one type of content over another. For example, loading a plain text and image website is not nearly as strenuous as loading sites such as Hulu and YouTube. Frieden states that "Some Internet Service Providers (ISPs) seek to diversify the Internet by prioritizing bitstreams and by offering different quality of service guarantees. To some observers, this strategy constitutes harmful discrimination that violates a tradition of network neutrality in the switching, routing, and transmission of Internet traffic." While the QoS argument is that network neutrality rules make allowances for network owners to practice some types of discrimination to protect the functioning of the network.

==== Argument Against Data Discrimination ====
Those who oppose data discrimination say that it hurts the growth of the Internet, as well as the economy that is rooted in the depths of the Internet model. "Instead of promoting competition, such picking of winners and losers will stifle the investment needed to perpetuate the Internet's phenomenal growth, hurting the economy." If, for example, telecommunication network operators blocked data packets of Voice-over-IP services that might substitute their own telephone services, this would not only discriminate against specific firms but also reduce competition and economic welfare. Technically, this would not be a problem. Although data packets are homogeneous with respect to switching and transmission treatment, type, source, and destination can be revealed and data packets be handled differently if a network operator prefers to do so. Another problem is that the type of data that is given preferential treatment is up to the discretion of the ISP. This allows them to move data as they see fit, whether it be through a political, moral, any other such kind of "lens". This goes against the first amendment, the freedom of speech because by stopping certain kinds of information from reaching the end user, they are censoring content. It is not the place of the ISP to censor content from the people.

The real threat to an open Internet is at the local network (the ends), where network owners can block information coming in from the inter-network, but it also is at the local network where the most harm can occur. Because of this, network neutrality rules allow some discrimination by the local network to protect itself, though it may not be based on content or type of application. For example, network owners want to protect their networks from being damaged. So, some discrimination is allowed to "prevent physical harm to the local Broadband Network caused by any network attachment or network usage." This means that local network operators may not control which types of applications users choose to employ, what type of devices users use to access the network, or which type of legal content users choose to convey or consume. The only allowable restrictions are on applications that cause harm to the local network.

Proponents of network neutrality concede that network security is crucial enough to warrant making an exception to a network neutrality rule. Allowing network providers to deviate from neutrality only to the extent necessary to protect network trustworthiness is rooted in judicial and regulatory decisions and administrative rules that helped establish the principle of nondiscrimination as the core of network neutrality. Sen. Al Franken has spoken out on FCC rulings "calling net neutrality the 'free speech issue of our time,'" Franken (D-MN) expressed his displeasure with the FCC's recent net neutrality rules. 'These rules are not strong enough,' he said, pointing out that paid prioritization was not banned and that wireless networks are allowed to discriminate at will. The rules mark the 'first time the FCC has ever allowed discrimination on the Internet' and they 'will create essentially two Internets.'

Another important concept for marketers to understand is that of disparate impact. If a discrimination case is brought against your company, the plaintiff would have to show evidence of disparate impact.

=== Concerns about political discrimination ===
In 2005, the FCC issued a Broadband Policy Statement (also known as the Internet Policy Statement) that offered guidance and insight into its approach to the Internet and broadband consistent with Congress' direction. (FCC) The four principles of this statement are as follows:

- To encourage broadband deployment and preserve and promote the open and interconnected nature of the public Internet, consumers are entitled to access the lawful Internet content of their choice.

- To encourage broadband deployment and preserve and promote the open and interconnected nature of the public Internet, consumers are entitled to run applications and use services of their choice, subject to the needs of law enforcement.

- To encourage broadband deployment and preserve and promote the open and interconnected nature of the public Internet, consumers are entitled to connect their choice of legal devices that do not harm the network.

- To encourage broadband deployment and preserve and promote the open and interconnected nature of the public Internet, consumers are entitled to competition among network providers, application and service providers, and content providers.

At first glance, these principles appear noncontroversial in terms of standards regarding the freedom of the network. However, these principles do not address regulations with respect to the issues of differentiations in pricing, interconnection, and QoS. Further, the unregulated forms of net bias have the potential to create false congestion by the ISPs. More specifically, advanced Internet protocol technology can allow ISPs to fabricate congestion and drop packets when no real congestion takes place. In addition, existing peering and transit agreements between stakeholders such as small and large ISPs may lack a specific prohibition of deliberate packet loss.

Many ISPs contend that major content providers such as Google or Yahoo! enjoy a free ride. AT&T, one of the major ISPs, stated that the current standard procedure for Internet pricing and interconnection has left the company burdened with having to create, maintain, and frequently upgrade an expensive bit transport infrastructure whereas content providers do not have to do the same. However, Rob Frieden points out that the ISPs' practices of net bias, as they are based on a "free rider" consideration, may violate the principles of network freedom or even the peering and transit agreement between ISPs. Based on existing peering and transit agreements made by AT&T, Google is allowed to have its traffic delivered to AT&T subscribers free of charge, and AT&T is compensated for the traffic from other ISPs by the agreements. Moreover, if AT&T penalizes Google's traffic from the various forms of net bias, it would jeopardize the principles of network freedom as well as violate its contractual commitment to its peers and transit customers who have paid for best efforts access to AT&T's networks.

Technical and market convergence as well as deregulation by the Telecommunications Act of 1996 provided incentives for companies to integrate vertically and horizontally. As a result, those integrated companies have discrimination incentives such that they may try port blocking or unfair throttling to enhance the marketplace attractiveness of corporate affiliates. From this perspective, Free Press emphasized through its comments to the FCC Notice of Inquiry that specialized services should be provided with fairness, particularly in the vertically integrated environments of the information and telecommunication industry (e.g., Comcast, which has both content and broadband services). Consequently, concerns regarding discrimination raised the need of network neutrality regulations to preserve the open Internet and public interest and enable the Internet industry to survive and succeed.

== The FCC and Data Discrimination ==
In the United States, the Federal Communications Commission does not permit data discrimination except for "reasonable traffic management".

The Federal Communications Commission defines reasonable traffic management as follows:

A network management practice is reasonable if it is appropriate and tailored to achieving a legitimate network management purpose, taking into account the particular network architecture and technology of the broadband Internet access service.

It is considered unreasonable for internet service providers to manage traffic by blocking applications or assigning quality of service based on source, destination, or unreasonable application provider payment. Regardless, there are currently no laws prohibiting internet service providers from offering different service plans that may restrict consumers' access to selected material. In June 2007 the Federal Trade Commission (FTC) published Broadband Connectivity Competition Policy which suggested that it may be beneficial to consumers if broadband providers would pursue a variety of business arrangements, including data prioritization, exclusive deals, and vertical integration into online content and applications. The report also suggests that government should move cautiously in implementing any changes to current regulations.

=== FCC Appeals ===
- Verizon Communications filed an appeal against the FCC in the United States Court of Appeals for the DC Circuit on January 20, 2011. The FCC's rules aim to prevent Internet service providers from blocking certain websites or applications. Verizon's appeal claims that the FCC has overstepped its authority and that the rules violate the company's constitutional rights. The company says that the net neutrality rules modify the terms of existing licenses held by Verizon. Rather than launching a lawsuit that directly challenges the regulations, the company is appealing the rules as an illegal change to their existing licenses.
  - "It has been a very long and drawn out fight, and it has certainly distracted the FCC for the last year. It has distracted the carriers as well, who have spent a lot of time, effort and money in terms of publicly fighting about it and privately fighting about it," says Larry Downes an industry consultant and author..."It is very, very unlikely that AT&T will file suit," said Downes. "They've said publicly and repeatedly that they are comfortable with the net neutrality order and I take that as a pretty strong indication that they are not going to litigate it."

=== Evidence of Anti-competitiveness ===
During a hearing held by Rep. Greg Walden, one of the speakers put forth a question that needs to be addressed by the FCC, as well as other groups that are in support of Net Neutrality. The speaker said, "If the mere threat of Internet discrimination is such a concern and if the FCC has done no analysis to demonstrate why one company has more market power than another, why would discrimination by companies like Google or Skype be any more acceptable than discrimination by companies like AT&T and Comcast?" During the same hearing, a different member spoke up and quoted Section 230 of the Communications Act saying, "...preserve the vibrant and competitive free market that presently exists for the Internet and other interactive computer services, unfettered by federal or state regulations." essentially saying that there should be laws in place so that the government knows how to handle its authority over the FCC and ISPs. He did not say that these laws are not laws meant for regulating what the FCC does, but how the FCC should act.

In 2005, a small North Carolina telecom company, Madison River Communications, blocked their DSL customers from using the Vonage VoIP service. Service was restored after the Federal Communications Commission (FCC) intervened and entered into a consent decree that had Madison River pay a fine of $15,000. In this case, the FCC investigated allegations that Madison River violated nondiscriminatory obligations contained in the Communications Act, but the redefinition of broadband as an information service dramatically reduces the authority of regulators to deter this kind of competitive misconduct.

As Anti-Piracy

- "Network-level filtering means your Internet service provider – Comcast, AT&T, EarthLink, or whoever you send that monthly check to – could soon start sniffing your digital packets, looking for material that infringes on someone's copyright. "What we are already doing to address piracy hasn't been working. There's no secret there..."" This may be one of the major reasons that ISPs want to be able to discriminate against certain data types. Ever since the dawn of peer-to-peer file sharing, both the MPAA and the RIAA have been hounding ISPs to divulge any and all information relating to file sharing. With the implementation of data discrimination, that file sharing data can be, and will be, thrown to the bottom of the pecking order. This will render any kind of sharing, even the kind that isn't deemed illegal, useless because the transfer speeds will be unusably slow.
- Center of Digital Democracy (CDD) conducts a study which finds out several internet service providers (ISP) offer advertising companies specific packages for users personal information.

== Examples ==
Worldwide, the BitTorrent application is widely given reduced bandwidth or even in some cases blocked entirely. Worldwide, under heavy attack from spam e-mail, many e-mail servers no longer accept connections except from white-listed hosts. While few care about the rights of spammers, this means that legitimate hosts not on the list are often blocked.

Save The Internet, an advocacy organization led by Free Press, is documenting situations in which ISPs have engaged in data discrimination.

- In 2005, Canadian telephone giant Telus blocked access to voices-for-change.ca, a website supporting the company's labour union during a labour dispute, as well as over 600 other websites, for about sixteen hours after pictures were posted on the website of employees crossing the picket line.
- In April 2006, Time Warner's AOL (America On Line) blocked all e-mails that mentioned www.dearaol.com, an advocacy campaign opposing the company's pay-to-send e-mail scheme. An AOL spokesman called the issue an unintentional glitch.
- In February 2006, some of Cox Cable's customers were unable to access Craigslist because of a confluence of a software bug in the Authentium personal firewall distributed by Cox Cable to improve customers' security and the way that Craigslist had their servers misconfigured. Save the Internet said this was an intentional act on the part of Cox Cable to protect classified ad services offered by its partners. The issue was resolved by correction of the software as well as a change in the network configuration used by Craig's List. Craig's List founder Craig Newmark stated that he believed the blocking was unintentional.
- In August 2007, Comcast was found to be preventing or at least severely delaying uploads on BitTorrent. These claims were verified in October by the EFF and Associated Press.
- In September 2007, Verizon Wireless prevented a pro-choice organization from sending text messages to its members coordinating a public demonstration, despite the fact that the intended recipients had explicitly signed up to receive such messages.
- On February 4, 2010, Verizon Wireless blocked 4chan, an English language imageboard from being accessed by its customers. A few days later, on February 7, 2010, Verizon Wireless confirmed that 4chan had been "explicitly blocked", offering no explanation. The block was lifted a few days later.
- In a March 2009 Freedom House report on Internet and digital media censorship worldwide, Egypt scored a 45 (out of 100), slightly worse than Turkey but better than Russia. Cuba scored a 90, making it more Net-censored than even Iran, China and Tunisia. Cellphone service is too expensive for most Cubans.
- Comcast Corp. actively interferes with attempts by some of its high-speed Internet subscribers to share files online, a move that runs counter to the tradition of treating all types of Net traffic equally. The interference, which The Associated Press confirmed through nationwide tests, is the most drastic example yet of data discrimination by a U.S. Internet service provider. It involves company computers masquerading as those of its users. Comcast's interference appears to be an aggressive way of managing its network to keep file-sharing traffic from swallowing too much bandwidth and affecting the Internet speeds of other subscribers.
  - If widely applied by other ISPs, the technology Comcast is using would be a crippling blow to the BitTorrent, eDonkey and Gnutella file-sharing networks. While these are mainly known as sources of copyright music, software and movies, BitTorrent in particular is emerging as a legitimate tool for quickly disseminating legal content.
