= Center for Individual Freedom =

American policy advocacy organization

Coordinates: 38.8054°N 77.0486°W

The Center for Individual Freedom (CFIF) is an Alexandria, Virginia, based U.S. nonprofit conservative policy advocacy organization.

== History ==
The Center for Individual Freedom was founded in 1998 by former tobacco industry executives who sought to counter government restrictions on smoking. W. Thomas Humber, former head of the National Smokers Alliance, transferred several million dollars from the alliance to assist in the establishment of the CFIC.

It has led efforts to defeat efforts to compel "dark money" groups like it from being forced to reveal their donors. It won a victory in September 2012 when a U.S. appeals court overturned a lower court decision that increased disclosure requirements. Despite this, Mother Jones reported in April 2012 that the Center for Individual Freedom had been given $2.75 million from Crossroads GPS, the conservative non-profit started by Karl Rove. Paul Ryan, an attorney with the Campaign Legal Center (a group in favor of campaign finance regulation), says CFIF's anti-disclosure cases are without merit but adds that challenging disclosure laws is a new attempt to deregulate campaign finance. The money spent in 2010 on the ads was not specified on CFIF's tax return as political spending, but as education or legislative activities.

CFIF was involved in several federal appellate proceedings in 2012-2013, including Center for Individual Freedom v. Madigan before the Seventh Circuit in 2012 and Center for Individual Freedom v. Tennant before the Fourth Circuit in 2013.

In the 2010 elections CFIF spent $2.5 million supporting Republican candidates, and in the 2012 elections it spent $1.9 million.

In April 2016, it was reported that CFIF spent $200,000 on advertisements opposing the Puerto Rico debt relief bill. The Center also launched a radio ad, criticizing Representative Sean Duffy for his inconsistent stance on the bill. The 2016 campaign ended up exceeding costs of $2 million overall.

The CFIF supported efforts to repeal net neutrality laws in 2017.

A story by Gizmodo found that CFIF was involved in the communications industry's campaign against net neutrality.

In 2024, CFIF launched a podcast called IP Protection Matters, which discusses intellectual property issues.
