= Plug.dj =

Interactive social music streaming website

plug.dj
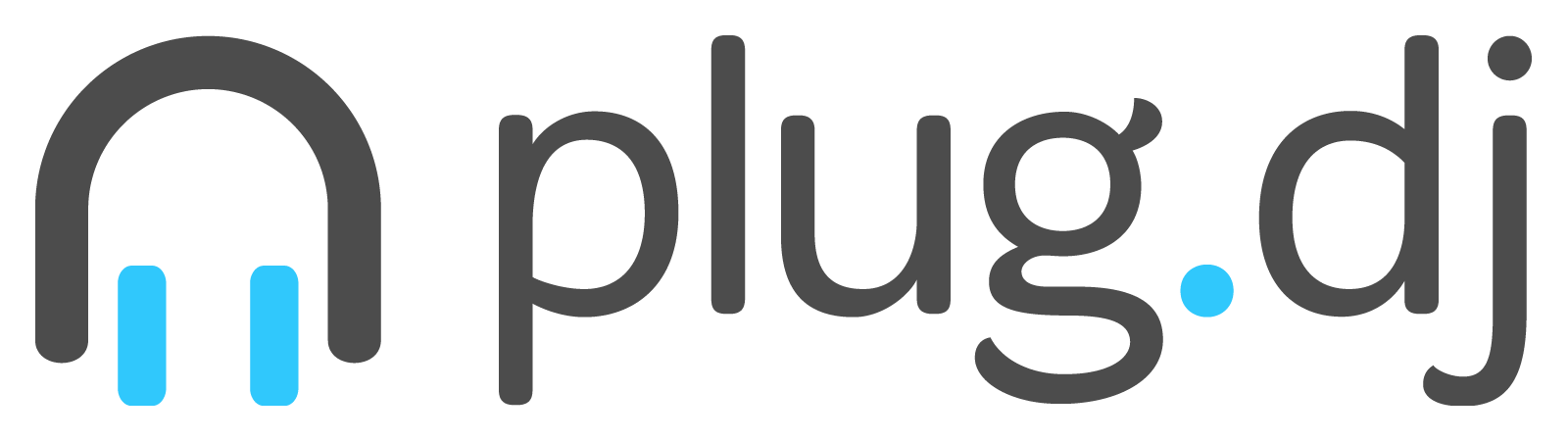
- Company type: Private
- Available in: Multilingual, primarily English
- Founded: February 2012; 14 years ago
- Founders: Steven Sacks; Alex Reinlieb; Jason Grunstra
- Website: plug.dj
- Registration: Email or Facebook account
- Current status: Closed as of Feb 9th, 2021
- Written in: Go (backend)

plug.dj was an interactive online social music streaming website based in Los Angeles, owned by Rowl, Inc. The site was "dedicated to growing positive international communities for sharing and discovering music". It was a free service with microtransactions, and had over 3 million registered accounts. The website was launched on February 29, 2012, by Steven Sacks, Alex Reinlieb, and Jason Grunstra.

== Overview ==
Plug.dj consisted of different online chat rooms, called "communities", that users could freely create. Inside each community, users could choose to join a wait list and wait for their turn to be the DJ for everyone else in the community, playing a video or song chosen from either YouTube or SoundCloud, or simply listen passively. Users could also vote positively or negatively for each song or video played, or add it to their own playlists. By spending time or being active on the site, they were able to earn experience points (XP) and plug points (PP), which could be used to unlock and purchase various items, such as new avatars and chat badges. Each community on plug.dj was typically focused on a few specific musical genres, usually one of the subgenres of EDM (Electronic Dance Music), such as Trap, Dubstep, Electro, Drum'n'Bass and many others. Communities dedicated to non-electronic genres, such as rock, jazz, death metal, and classical also existed. The community creator was able to promote users to moderators to help ensure the community's rules were followed and to keep the environment friendly. Volunteer global moderators, called "Brand Ambassadors", also existed.

In April 2015, a paid subscription service was launched, which provided access to subscriber avatars and badges without the user having to spend PP.

== Financial issues and relaunches ==
=== 2015 shutdown ===
On September 14, 2015, plug.dj announced that the service would be shutting down if it was unable to raise enough money to support the running of the service by a disclosed deadline of September 28 through a donation drive. It was noted by the administrators of plug.dj that the company was forced to sell their office and developers were to work from home in order to reduce running costs. Other attempts to reduce costs, like another tier in plug.dj subscription system, rewriting some portions of the backend in Go (plug.dj was previously written in Python, a less-efficient and consequently more expensive programming language to operate under) and cutting staff were unsuccessful in keeping the service afloat. On September 28, 2015, having not met their donation goal in time, the plug.dj service went offline at 3 PM Pacific Standard Time and the closure of its parent company, Plug DJ Inc. followed at an unknown date.

=== 2016 relaunch ===
On December 10, 2015, plug.dj posted a message on their Facebook page, saying "The hype is real". Later, on February 8, 2016, another post was made explaining that the service will likely return under new management at an unannounced date. The site was bought by Rowl, Inc and relaunched on May 31, 2016, with the existing user database restored. This brought all playlists back allowing users to keep all data that they had previously.

=== 2021 shutdown ===
On January 28, 2021, plug.dj services went offline without warning. The official Twitter page posted a tweet saying that plug.dj was working to resolve the issue "ASAP". After 12 days the service was still down, and on February 9, 2021, plug.dj announced that they would be shutting down once again due to financial issues, but with intent to resume service at an unspecified future time.

== Alternatives ==
- Bongo.dj - A social music streaming platform inspired by the original Plug.dj
- Cord.DJ – A 3D interactive world, browser-based social music platform with multiplayer mini-games.
- Wavez.fm – A browser-based social listening platform.
- Turntable.fm – A social music streaming platform centred around virtual DJ rooms and audience interaction.
- Pubby.club – A browser-based social listening and chat platform.
- QueUp.net – A collaborative music-sharing platform with user-created rooms and DJ queues.
- Hangout.fm – A social music platform inspired by the original Turntable.fm.
