= Tiered internet service =

Tiered service structures allow users to select from a small set of tiers at progressively increasing price points to receive the product or products best suited to their needs. Such systems are frequently seen in the telecommunications field, specifically when it comes to wireless service, digital and cable television options, and broadband internet access.

When a wireless company, for example, charges customers different amounts based on the number of cellphone voice minutes, text messages, amount of data and other features they desire, the company is utilizing the principle of tiered service. This is also seen in charging different prices for services such as the speed of one's internet connection and the number of cable television channels one has access to. Tiered pricing allows customers access to these services who may not otherwise due to financial constraints, ultimately reflecting the diversity of consumer needs and resources.

Tiered service helps to keep quality of service standards for high-bandwidth applications like streaming video or VoIP. This comes at a cost of increasing costs for better service levels. Major players in the net neutrality debate have proposed tiered internet so content providers who pay more to internet service providers get better quality service.

== History ==
It was not until the internet began its rapid evolution that tiered services became a controversial issue. And it was not until the early 2000s that internet carriers considered the option of abandoning net neutrality policies. In 2005, the FCC changed the way broadband service providers are regulated. This made broadband service providers "information services" instead of "telecommunications services". This means broadband service providers were no longer subject to common carrier regulations. Since the beginning of the twentieth century, common carriage guidelines required the quality of service must be the same for all users, preventing one customer from being favored over another. During the first decades of the 1900s, this policy related directly to the telephone industry, and AT&T specifically. However, in recent decades, the policy has grown to encompass a broader range of communication services. Preventing preferential treatment of customers in the realm of the internet is referred to as the policy of net neutrality.

In the US, the former chairman of the Federal Communications Commission (FCC), Michael Powell, considered net neutrality to be fundamental to the success of the internet and he viewed it as one of the basic rules to maintaining freedom on the internet. The FCC continued its skepticism of tiered pricing for quite some time, and it was not until concerns about the availability of the spectrum began to surface that things began to change. In 2010, FCC Chairman Julius Genachowski announced that the benefits of tiered pricing include helping to prevent data backups on networks. Genachowski expressed his fear of a coming "spectrum crisis" as a result of the increase in smartphone usage ultimately clogging carrier networks.

The FCC suggested a number of solutions to the problem including greater use of the unlicensed Wi-Fi spectrum, more femtocells, and more efficient arrangement of cellular towers, but even these measures were not believed to be enough to keep spectrum bands open. Attempts have been made to put price controls on tiered service. United States Congress put a bill forth to prevent a "two-tiered pricing scheme with priority service." The bill did not pass Congress, but allowed the FCC to stop ISPs from blocking websites. The way ISPs tier services for content providers and application providers is through "access-tiering". This is when a network operator grants bandwidth priority to those willing to pay for quality service. "Consumer-tiering" is where different speeds are marketed to consumers and prices are based on the consumers willingness to pay.

== Net neutrality ==
Net neutrality is the practice of keeping internet service providers from offering tiered service and controlling the ability to block out competition by restricting certain pipelines within the internet. By blocking these pipelines, the provider creates an unfair transfer of packets across the internet, diminishing the quality of service. Internet service providers seek to discriminate against peer-to-peer (P2P) communication, FTP, online games, and high bandwidth activities, such as video streaming. This practice is called bandwidth throttling.

In 2017, the FCC Voted to repeal "Net Neutrality" in their "Restoring Internet Freedom" Order. Fulling taking effect on June 11, 2018, the initiative removed barriers of the Title II regulations that had been placed on the internet service providers in 2015. Due to the repeal, internet service providers can initiate tiered internet services and are no longer required to treat all online traffic as equal. With the removed regulations, internet service providers can move forward with creating tiered internet services. Proponents of the repeal argue that the tiered internet service will allow for increased innovation in the internet. Detractors argue that it will create anti-consumer measures that crowd out emerging businesses and create a bundling system that is not within consumer preference.

== Responses to repealing net neutrality ==
Within the United States alone, many have feared that the elimination of net neutrality will cause widespread damage to the accessibility and freedom of the internet. Particularly, senators such as Jeanne Shaheen of New Hampshire have openly criticized decisions by the Federal Communications Commission to repeal net neutrality rules in their 2017 Order. In a U.S. Senate Committee on Small Business & Entrepreneurship that occurred in May 2018, Senator Shaheen stated that a lack of net neutrality will have "major ramifications for consumers as well as for small businesses." The Senator goes on to elaborate that small businesses within her state have expressed fears that broadband providers will create unfair pay systems for access to the internet that would inevitable put them at a competitive disadvantage. These concerns are especially valid in regions of New Hampshire where rural communities do not have access to high-speed broadband, or limited access with only one provider.

Despite outspoken opposition from those such as Senator Shaheen, many data carriers argue that the ability to differentiate charges and access of data will allow them to increase incentives to develop innovation. This developed innovation will lead to faster service and better accessibility to content for all consumers. Most recently, the FCC's move to adopt the 2017 Order has reignited the debate over how much Congress should regulate the existing net neutrality laws. The debates over this regulatory framework are expected to continue in the 116th Congress.

== Tiered internet ==
=== Implications ===
A tiered internet gives priority to packets sent and received by end users that pay a premium for service. Network operators do this because of issues such as network management and equipment configuration, traffic engineering, service level agreements, billing, and customer support.

=== Tiered service fair queuing ===
Fair queuing is an algorithm that allows for network moderators to control packets by assigning flow weights. Groups of guaranteed-service applications are classed by their nature (e.g. "voice","video","game") based on similar bandwidth and delay requirements. These guaranteed-service applications are given priority over best-effort applications which are limited by the access bandwidth available to the user.

=== Continuous rate network model ===
The continuous-rate network model allow users to request any amount of bandwidth necessary for their uses and the network must be able to provide any arbitrary amount requested. There must be mechanisms put into place by the network provider that allows for a distinguishing to be made for these arbitrary requests. This process can become almost impossible for traffic with a finite duration. Bandwidth requests are inherently variable in size, arrival time, and duration and creates link capacity across the continuous rate network to become fragmented. The network would then have much difficulty in maintaining a sufficient level of utilization and users’ expected quality of service.

=== Arguments ===
Initial reasoning against tiered service was that ISPs would use it to block content on the internet. Internet service providers could use this to prioritize affiliated partners instead of unaffiliated ones. Many argue that one fast network is much more efficient than deliberately throttling web traffic to create a tiered internet.

=== AT&T ===
AT&T had a trial in 2008 in Reno, NV which was one of the first cases of tiered service for in-home broadband internet pertaining to the amount of data used.

=== BT Group ===
BT Group, a British telecommunications giant, is now going to charge users of their service extra for faster delivery of content. Meaning that they will not be handling all traffic across their network equally.

== Tiered cellular data plans ==
=== AT&T ===
AT&T revised their cellular data plans to create data tiers for specific types of usage. AT&T indicated that tiered pricing may be brought on in the future for LTE data plans.

=== Metro PCS ===
MetroPCS has been accused of violating net neutrality by their proposed tiered cell phone data services. With some of these services being capped at a certain maximum, this violates various agreements for an open internet.

=== Sprint ===
Sprint is implementing tiered data plans for their mobile broadband products. The plans come in 3GB, 5GB, and 10GB capacities. Sprint previously claimed to have unlimited service, as this is their first venture into tiered pricing schemes.

=== Verizon ===
Verizon Wireless introduced their LTE network with the capability for tiered services at the end of 2010. Because the company's 4G network is now available in cities across the United States, Verizon has the opportunity to charge premium prices for faster data delivery. Such data plans allow Verizon to charge under a tiered service platform, similar to many home wired internet services.

== Arguments ==
There are many arguments between ISPs, who traditionally support tiered services, and network neutrality proponents. ISPs state that tiered services are necessary to keep and maintain network performance. Also, tiered pricing schemes provide ISPs with an incentive to upgrade their networks and provide better service. Network neutrality proponents say that ISPs do not have the right to degrade internet services to certain users and that their service should be open and consistent. Verizon CEO, Ivan Seidenberg, expressed his concerns with network neutrality regulations saying that stricter regulations preventing tiered services ignore the "benefits of smart networks." In 2011, it was reported that both critics and proponents believe that the debate over net neutrality and tiered services has become increasingly more partisan.
