= Kevin Martin (lawyer) =

American lawyer

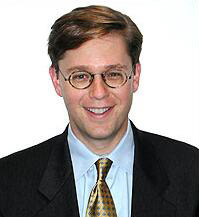

25th Chairman of the Federal Communications Commission
- In office March 18, 2005 – January 20, 2009
- President: George W. Bush
- Preceded by: Michael Powell
- Succeeded by: Julius Genachowski

Personal details
- Born: December 14, 1966 (age 59) Charlotte, North Carolina, U.S.
- Party: Republican
- Spouse: Catherine Jurgensmeyer
- Education: University of North Carolina Chapel Hill (BA); Duke University (MPP); Harvard University (JD)

Kevin Jeffrey Martin (born December 14, 1966) is an American lobbyist for Facebook and former member and Chairman of the U.S. Federal Communications Commission (FCC), an independent agency of the United States government. He was nominated to be a commissioner by President George W. Bush on April 30, 2001, and was confirmed on May 25, 2001. On March 16, 2005, President Bush designated him as FCC chairman, to replace Michael K. Powell. President Bush renominated Martin to a new five-year term on the Commission on April 25, 2006, and he was reconfirmed by the U.S. Senate on November 17, 2006. In January 2009, Martin announced that he would step down from the FCC and join the Aspen Institute, as a senior fellow in the think tank's Communications and Society Program. He since became a partner with the law firm Squire Patton Boggs LLP, and was hired as Facebook's head of U.S. Public Policy.

== Education ==
Martin went to Charlotte Catholic High School. He earned a B.A. from the University of North Carolina at Chapel Hill (where he was elected student body president), an M.P.P. from Duke University, and a J.D. from Harvard Law School. He is a member of the Florida Bar, District of Columbia Bar and the Federal Communications Bar Association. Martin married Catherine Jurgensmeyer; the couple reside in Washington, D.C.

== Prior offices ==
Upon graduation from law school, Martin served as a judicial clerk for Judge William M. Hoeveler of the U.S. District Court for the Southern District of Florida in Miami.

Before becoming a commissioner, Martin was a Special Assistant to the President for Economic Policy. He served as the Deputy General Counsel to Bush-Cheney 2000, on the Bush-Cheney recount team in Florida, and on the presidential transition team. Before joining Bush-Cheney 2000, Martin served as legal advisor to FCC Commissioner Harold Furchtgott-Roth, in the Office of the Independent Counsel, and as an associate of Wiley Rein LLP.

== Allegations of misconduct ==
On December 10, 2008, the House Energy and Commerce Committee's oversight and investigations subcommittee released a 110-page report of a year-long investigation of the actions of Kevin Martin during his tenure as Chairman of the FCC. In January 2008, the committee launched a bipartisan investigation after allegations of mismanagement from past FCC employees, representatives of the Telecommunications industry as well as from other FCC commissioners. The report was issued in lieu of hearings due to the fact that key witnesses were unwilling to testify or be identified by name.

The report concluded that Martin did not violate any law, and did not show clear evidence of wrongdoing, although it criticized Martin for leading the commission with a "heavy-handed, opaque, and non-collegial management style [that] has created distrust, suspicion and turmoil among the five current commissioners." It also stated that the Martin routinely violated travel rules by renting "premium class vehicles" and charging per diem work fees for days he was not working.

The report further stated that on becoming the FCC Chairman in 2005, Martin manipulated information given to other Commissioners and to Congress. A specific example given was that Martin ordered FCC staff to reverse a study finding which initially stated "a la carte" cable programming would not benefit consumers. He also demoted the Media Bureau chief, who had been in charge of the study.

According to the report, some of Martin's actions had led to price jumps for consumers of Telecommunications services. It said that Martin mismanaged a fund for telecommunications relay services which allow people with speech or hearing disabilities to communicate with hearing people. Accordingly, consumers were overcharged and providers were overcompensated more than $100 million a year. The fund, which is paid for by companies who then relay the charges to their consumers had grown to more than $800 million. The largest TRS provider, Sorenson Communications, Inc., handled roughly 80% of these services, thus stood to gain the most from this lack of oversight. A previous attempt by the FCC to audit Sorenson by a contractor was denied when Sorenson prevented access to staff and systems necessary to conduct the audit. A probe was later launched, and in May 2013 Sorenson settled the probe and was ordered to pay $15.75 million. The settlement followed a similar settlement by AT&T that month where the company agreed to pay $18.25 million for similar overbilling.

== Legacy ==
On January 15, 2009, Martin announced his resignation as the new Administration takes over. In a statement, he said his philosophy during his tenure at the FCC "has been to pursue deregulation while paying close attention to its impact on consumers and the particulars of a given market, to balance deregulation with consumer protection." The statement notes what Martin accomplished during his tenure, including one promoting broadband, and specifically wireless broadband, and protecting consumers from harm, by issuing $150 million in fines, or more than any other chairman.

== Subsequent career ==
Beginning in September 2009, Martin began serving on the Board of Directors of the telecommunications hardware company, Xtera Communications.

In 2013, Martin was a signatory to an amicus curiae brief submitted to the Supreme Court in support of same-sex marriage during the Hollingsworth v. Perry case.

In 2018, Facebook hired Martin to be the interim head of its U.S. Public Policy team in Washington D.C.

Government offices
Preceded by Michael K. Powell	Chairman of the Federal Communications Commission; March 18, 2005–January 20, 2009	Succeeded by Julius Genachowski
