= Colin Powell =

American U.S. Army general and diplomat (1937–2021)

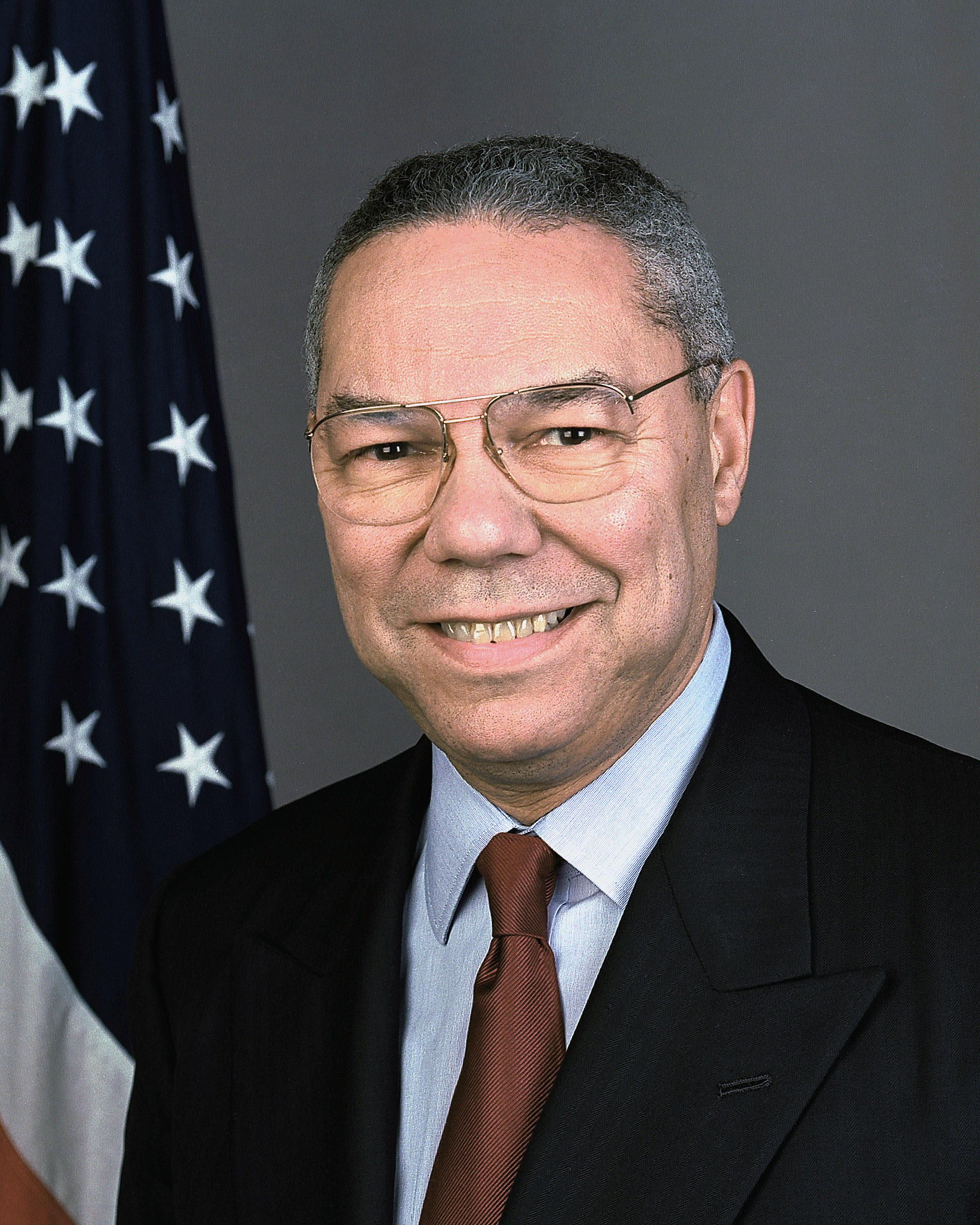
- Official portrait, 2001

65th United States Secretary of State
- In office January 20, 2001 – January 26, 2005
- President: George W. Bush
- Deputy: Richard Armitage
- Preceded by: Madeleine Albright
- Succeeded by: Condoleezza Rice

12th Chairman of the Joint Chiefs of Staff
- In office October 1, 1989 – September 30, 1993
- President: George H. W. Bush; Bill Clinton
- Deputy: Robert T. Herres; David E. Jeremiah
- Preceded by: William J. Crowe
- Succeeded by: John Shalikashvili

15th United States National Security Advisor
- In office November 23, 1987 – January 20, 1989
- President: Ronald Reagan
- Deputy: John Negroponte
- Preceded by: Frank Carlucci
- Succeeded by: Brent Scowcroft

United States Deputy National Security Advisor
- In office December 2, 1986 – November 23, 1987
- President: Ronald Reagan
- Preceded by: Peter Rodman
- Succeeded by: John Negroponte

Personal details
- Born: Colin Luther Powell; April 5, 1937 New York City, U.S.
- Died: October 18, 2021 (aged 84) Bethesda, Maryland, U.S.
- Resting place: Arlington National Cemetery
- Party: Independent (until 1995, 2021); Republican (1995–2021)
- Spouse: Alma Johnson (m. 1962)
- Children: 3, including Michael and Linda
- Education: City College of New York (BS); George Washington University (MBA)

Military service
- Allegiance: United States
- Branch/service: United States Army
- Years of service: 1958–1993
- Rank: General
- Unit: 3rd Armored Division; 23rd Infantry Division
- Commands: Chairman, Joint Chiefs of Staff; U.S. Army Forces Command; V Corps; 2nd Brigade, 101st Airborne Division; 1st Battalion, 32nd Infantry Regiment
- Battles/wars: Vietnam War; Invasion of Panama; Gulf War
- Awards

Colin Luther Powell (/ˈkoʊlɪn ˈpaʊəl/ KOH-lin POW-əl; (Note: Despite his parents' pronunciation of his name as /ˈkɒlɪn/ KOL-in, Powell pronounced his name /ˈkoʊlɪn/ KOH-lin from childhood on after the World War II flyer Colin Kelly. The preferred pronunciation of "Powell" rhymes with "bowel", not with "Joel".) April 5, 1937 – October 18, 2021) was an American U.S. Army general, diplomat, and statesman who served as the 65th United States secretary of state from 2001 to 2005, being the first Black American to hold the office, and was the highest-ranking Black American in the federal executive branch in American history (along with his successor Condoleezza Rice) until the election of Barack Obama as president in 2008. Initially politically independent, Powell joined the Republican Party in 1995, but left it in 2021 following the January 6 United States Capitol attack. He was the 15th national security advisor from 1987 to 1989, and the 12th chairman of the Joint Chiefs of Staff from 1989 to 1993.

Powell was born in New York City in 1937 to parents who emigrated from Jamaica. He was raised in the South Bronx and educated in the New York City public schools, earning a bachelor's degree in geology from the City College of New York. He joined the Reserve Officers' Training Corps while at City College and was commissioned as a second lieutenant on graduating in 1958. He was a professional soldier for 35 years, holding many command and staff positions and rising to the rank of four-star general. He was commander of the U.S. Army Forces Command in 1989.

Powell's last military assignment, from October 1989 to September 1993, was as Joint Chiefs of Staff chairman, the highest military position in the United States Department of Defense. During this time, he oversaw 28 crises, including the invasion of Panama in 1989 and Operation Desert Storm in the Persian Gulf War against Iraq in 1990–1991. He formulated the Powell Doctrine, which limits American military action unless it satisfies criteria regarding American national security interests, overwhelming force, and widespread public support. He served as secretary of state under Republican president George W. Bush. As secretary of state, Powell gave a presentation to the United Nations Security Council regarding the rationale for the Iraq War, but he later admitted that the speech contained substantial inaccuracies. He resigned after Bush was reelected in 2004.

In 1995, Powell wrote his autobiography, My American Journey and then in retirement another book titled, It Worked for Me: In Life and Leadership (2012). He pursued a career as a public speaker, addressing audiences across the country and abroad. Before his appointment as Secretary of State he chaired America's Promise. In the 2016 United States presidential election, Powell, who was not a candidate, received three electoral votes from Faithless Electors in the State of Washington for the office of President of the United States. He won numerous U.S. and foreign military awards and decorations, including the Purple Heart. His civilian awards included the Presidential Medal of Freedom (twice), the Congressional Gold Medal, the Presidential Citizens Medal, and the Secretary's Distinguished Service Award. Powell died from complications of COVID-19 in 2021, while being treated for a form of blood cancer that damaged his immune system.

== Early life and education ==
Colin Luther Powell was born on April 5, 1937, in Harlem, a neighborhood in the New York City borough of Manhattan. He was born to Jamaican immigrants Maud Ariel (née McKoy) and Luther Theophilus Powell. Both his parents were predominantly of African descent, with distant Irish, and Scottish ancestry. Luther worked as a shipping clerk and Maud as a seamstress. Powell was raised in the South Bronx and attended the now closed Morris High School, from which he graduated in 1954.

While at school, Powell worked at a local baby furniture store, where he picked up Yiddish from the Eastern European Jewish shopkeepers and some of the customers. He also served as a Shabbos goy, helping Orthodox families with needed tasks on the Sabbath. He received a bachelor of science degree in geology from the City College of New York in 1958 and said that he was a "C average" student.

While attending the City College of New York, Powell joined the Reserve Officers' Training Corps (ROTC), and went to a "straight A student" in it.

He described the experience as one of the happiest experiences of his life. According to Powell:

It was only once I was in college, about six months into college when I found something that I liked, and that was ROTC, Reserve Officer Training Corps in the military. And I not only liked it, but I was pretty good at it. That's what you really have to look for in life, something that you like, and something that you think you're pretty good at. And if you can put those two things together, then you're on the right track, and just drive on.

As a cadet, Powell joined the Pershing Rifles, the ROTC fraternal organization and drill team begun by General John Pershing. Powell held the distinction of being the first chairman to have attained his commission through ROTC.

Powell also graduated from George Washington University with an MBA in 1971 and was awarded an honorary doctor of public service in 1990.

== U.S. Army officer (1958–1993) ==
Powell was a professional soldier for thirty-five years, holding a variety of command and staff positions and rising to the rank of general.

=== Early career ===
Upon graduation, he received a commission as an Army second lieutenant; at this time, the Army was newly desegregated. He underwent training in the state of Georgia, where he was refused service in bars and restaurants because of the color of his skin. After attending Infantry Officers Basic Course at Fort Benning, Powell was assigned to the 48th Infantry, in West Germany, as a platoon leader. From 1960 to 1962, he served as group liaison officer, company executive officer, and commander of Company A, 1st Battle Group, 4th Infantry, 2nd Infantry Brigade, 5th Infantry Division (Mechanized) at Fort Devens, Massachusetts.

=== Vietnam War ===
Captain Powell served a tour in Vietnam as a South Vietnamese Army (ARVN) advisor from 1962 to 1963. While on patrol in a Viet Cong-held area, he was wounded by stepping on a punji stake and was awarded a Purple Heart. The large infection made it difficult for him to walk, and caused his foot to swell for a short time, shortening his first tour.

Powell returned to Vietnam as a major in 1968, serving as assistant chief of staff of operations for the 23rd (Americal) Infantry Division. During the second tour in Vietnam he was decorated with the Soldier's Medal for bravery after he survived a helicopter crash and single-handedly rescued three others, including division commander Major General Charles M. Gettys, from the burning wreckage.

==== My Lai massacre inquiry ====
Soldiers allegedly hunted, herded, and killed elderly people, children, infants, and raped women while other Soldiers [sic] looked on and did nothing to stop the massacre. An estimated 350 to 500 unarmed civilians died in My Lai ... MAJ Colin Powell, a recently assigned Deputy G3, investigated the allegations described in the [Glen] letter. He proved unable to uncover either wide-spread unnecessary killings, war crimes, or any facts related to My Lai ...

— US Army Center for the Army Profession and Leadership, My Lai at 50: Written Case Study

Powell was charged with investigating a detailed letter by 11th Light Infantry Brigade soldier Tom Glen, which backed up rumored allegations of the 1968 My Lai massacre. Powell wrote: "In direct refutation of this portrayal is the fact that relations between Americal soldiers and the Vietnamese people are excellent". Later, Powell's assessment would be described as whitewashing the news of the massacre, and questions would continue to remain undisclosed to the public. In May 2004, Powell said to television and radio host Larry King, "I was in a unit that was responsible for My Lai. I got there after My Lai happened. So, in war, these sorts of horrible things happen every now and again, but they are still to be deplored".

=== After the Vietnam War ===
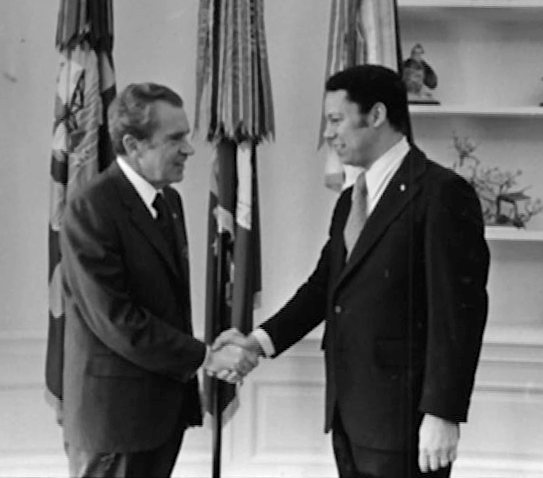
Richard Nixon and Powell, 1973

When he returned to the U.S. from Vietnam in 1971, Powell earned a Master of Business Administration degree from George Washington University in Washington, D.C. He later served a White House Fellowship under President Richard Nixon from 1972 to 1973. During 1975–1976 he attended the National War College, Washington, D.C.

In his autobiography, My American Journey, Powell named several officers he served under who inspired and mentored him. As a lieutenant colonel commanding 1st Battalion, 32nd Infantry, 2nd Infantry Division in South Korea, Powell was very close to his division commander, Major General Henry "Gunfighter" Emerson, whom he regarded as one of the most caring officers he ever met. Emerson insisted his troops train at night to fight a possible North Korean attack, and made them repeatedly watch the television film Brian's Song to promote racial harmony. Powell always professed that what set Emerson apart was his great love of his soldiers and concern for their welfare. After a race riot occurred, in which African-American soldiers almost killed a white officer, Powell was charged by Emerson to crack down on Black militants; Powell's efforts led to the discharge of one soldier, and other efforts to reduce racial tensions. During 1976–1977 he commanded the 2nd Brigade of the 101st Airborne Division.

Powell subsequently served as the junior military assistant to deputy secretaries of defense Charles Duncan and Graham Claytor, receiving a promotion to brigadier general on June 1, 1979. At the ceremony, he received from Secretary Harold Brown's protocol officer, Stuart Purviance, a framed quotation by President Abraham Lincoln. The quote was "I can make a brigadier general in five minutes. But it's not so easy to replace one hundred ten horses". Taped to the back of the frame was an envelope with instructions that it not be opened for ten years. When Powell opened the note in 1989, after he had become Chairman of the Joint Chiefs of Staff, he read Purviance's prediction that Powell would become Chief of Staff of the United States Army. Powell wrote that he kept the Lincoln quote as a reminder to remain humble despite his rank and position.

=== National Security Advisor and other advisory roles ===
Powell retained his role as the now-senior military assistant into the presidency of Ronald Reagan, serving under Claytor's successor as deputy secretary of defense, Frank Carlucci. Powell and Carlucci formed a close friendship, referring to each by first names in private, as Powell refused any sort of first-name basis in an official capacity. It was on Powell's advice that newly-elected President Ronald Reagan presented Roy Benavidez the Medal of Honor; Benavidez had received the Distinguished Service Cross, which his commander argued should be upgraded, but Army officials believed there was no living eyewitness to testify to Benavidez's heroism. A soldier who had been present during the action in question learned in July 1980 of the effort to upgrade Benavidez's medal and provided the necessary sworn statement; the upgrade to the Medal of Honor was approved in December 1980. Powell also declined an offer from Secretary of the Army John O. Marsh Jr. to be his under secretary due to his reluctance to assume a political appointment; James R. Ambrose was selected instead. Intent on attaining a division command, Powell petitioned Carlucci and Army chief of staff Edward C. Meyer for reassignment away from the Pentagon, with Meyer appointing Powell as assistant division commander for operations and training of the 4th Infantry Division at Fort Carson, Colorado under Major General John W. Hudachek.

After he left Fort Carson, Powell became the senior military assistant to Secretary of Defense Caspar Weinberger, whom he assisted during the 1983 invasion of Grenada and the 1986 airstrike on Libya. Under Weinberger, Powell was also involved in the unlawful transfer of U.S.-made TOW anti-tank missiles and Hawk anti-aircraft missiles from Israel to Iran as part of the criminal conspiracy that would later become known as the Iran–Contra affair. In November 1985, Powell solicited and delivered to Weinberger a legal assessment that the transfer of Hawk missiles to Israel or Iran, without Congressional notification, would be "a clear violation" of the law. Despite this, thousands of TOW missiles and hundreds of Hawk missiles and spare parts were transferred from Israel to Iran until the venture was exposed in a Lebanese magazine, Ash-Shiraa, in November 1986. According to Iran-Contra Independent Counsel Lawrence E. Walsh, when questioned by Congress, Powell "had given incomplete answers" concerning notes withheld by Weinberger and that the activities of Powell and others in concealing the notes "seemed corrupt enough to meet the new, poorly defined test of obstruction". Following his resignation as Secretary of Defense, Weinberger was indicted on five felony charges, including one count Obstruction of Congress for concealing the notes. Powell was never indicted by the Independent Counsel in connection with the Iran-Contra affair.

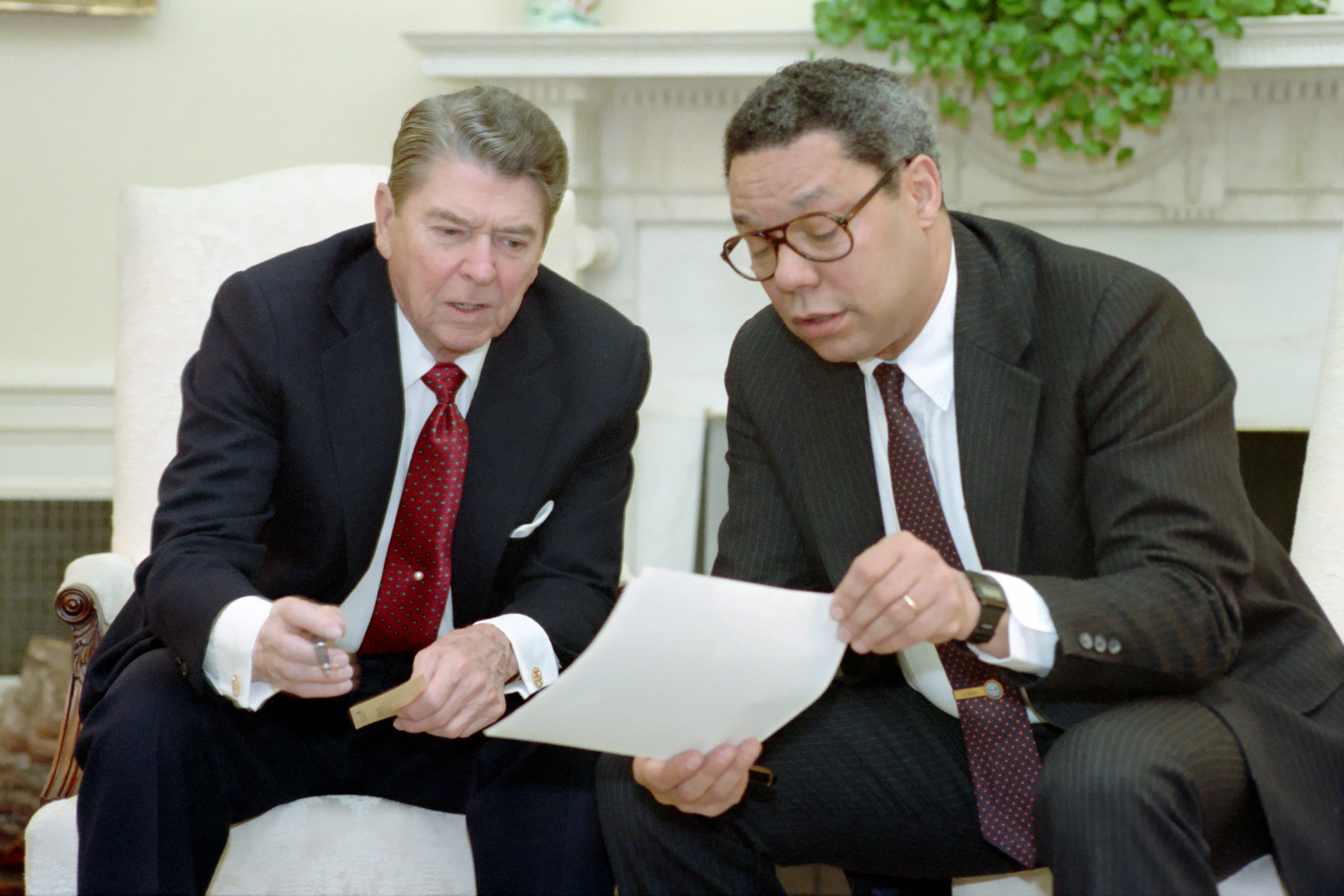
President Ronald Reagan and National Security Advisor Powell, April 18, 1988

In 1986, Powell took over the command of V Corps in Frankfurt, Germany, from Robert Lewis "Sam" Wetzel. The next year, he served as United States Deputy National Security Advisor, under Frank Carlucci.

Following the Iran–Contra scandal, Powell became, at the age of 49, Ronald Reagan's National Security Advisor, serving from 1987 to 1989 while retaining his Army commission as a lieutenant general. He helped negotiate a number of arms treaties with Mikhail Gorbachev, the leader of the Soviet Union.

In April 1989, after his tenure with the National Security Council, Powell was promoted to four-star general under President George H. W. Bush and briefly served as the Commander in Chief, Forces Command (FORSCOM), headquartered at Fort McPherson, Georgia, overseeing all active U.S. Army regulars, U.S. Army Reserve, and National Guard units in the Continental U.S., Hawaii, and Puerto Rico. He became the third general since World War II to reach four-star rank without ever serving as a division commander, joining Dwight D. Eisenhower and Alexander Haig.

Later that year, President George H. W. Bush selected him as Chairman of the Joint Chiefs of Staff.

=== Chairman of the Joint Chiefs of Staff ===
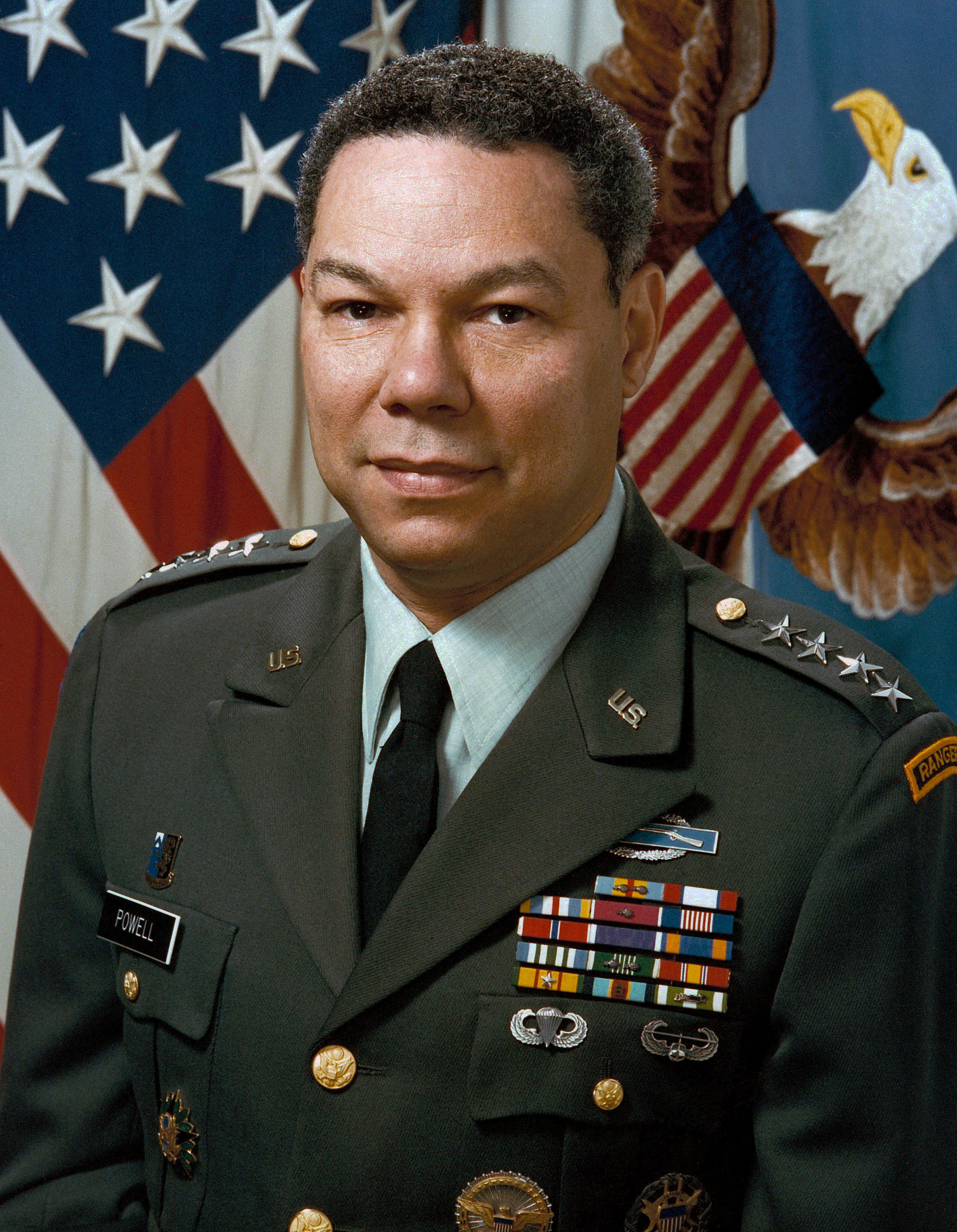
Powell's official portrait as Chairman of the Joint Chiefs of Staff, c. 1989

Powell's last military assignment, from October 1, 1989, to September 30, 1993, was as the 12th chairman of the Joint Chiefs of Staff, the highest military position in the Department of Defense. At age 52, he became the youngest officer, and first Afro-Caribbean American, to serve in this position. Powell was also the first JCS chair who received his commission through ROTC.

During this time, Powell oversaw responses to 28 crises, including the invasion of Panama in 1989 to remove General Manuel Noriega from power and Operation Desert Storm in the 1991 Persian Gulf War. During these events, Powell earned the nickname "the reluctant warrior"—although Powell himself disputed this label, and spoke in favor of the first Bush administration's Gulf War policies.

As a military strategist, Powell advocated an approach to military conflicts that maximizes the potential for success and minimizes casualties. A component of this approach is the use of overwhelming force, which he applied to Operation Desert Storm in 1991. His approach has been dubbed the Powell Doctrine. Powell continued as chairman of the JCS into the Clinton presidency. However, as a realist, he considered himself a bad fit for an administration largely made up of liberal internationalists. He clashed with then–U.S. ambassador to the United Nations Madeleine Albright over the Bosnian crisis, as he opposed any military intervention that did not involve U.S. interests.

Powell also regularly clashed with Secretary of Defense Leslie Aspin, whom he was initially hesitant to support after Aspin was nominated by President Clinton. During a lunch meeting between Powell and Aspin in preparation of Operation Gothic Serpent, Aspin was more focused on eating salad than listening and paying attention to Powell's presentation on military operations. The incident caused Powell to grow more irritated towards Aspin and led to his early resignation on September 30, 1993. Powell was succeeded temporarily by Vice Chairman of the Joint Chiefs of Staff Admiral David E. Jeremiah, who took the position as Acting Chairman of the Joint Chiefs of Staff. Soon after Powell's resignation, on October 3–4, 1993, the Battle of Mogadishu, the aim of which was to capture Somali warlord Mohamed Farrah Aidid, was initiated and ended in disaster. Powell later defended Aspin, saying in part that he could not fault Aspin for Aspin's decision to remove a Lockheed AC-130 from the list of armaments requested for the operation.

Powell took an early resignation from his tenure as Chairman of the Joint Chiefs of Staff on September 30, 1993.

The following year President Clinton sent newly retired Powell, together with former president Jimmy Carter and Senator Sam Nunn, to visit Haiti in an effort to persuade General Raoul Cédras and the ruling junta to abdicate in favor of former Haitian President Aristide, under the threat of an imminent U.S. invasion to remove them by force. Powell's status as a retired general was well known and respected in Haiti and was held to be instrumental in persuading Gen. Cédras.

During his chairmanship of the JCS, there was discussion of awarding Powell a fifth star, granting him the rank of General of the Army. Despite public and Congressional pressure to do so, the incumbent Clinton administration decided against it.

=== Dates of rank ===
Promotions
Rank	Date
General	April 4, 1989
Lieutenant general	July 1, 1986
Major general	August 1, 1983
Brigadier general	June 1, 1979
Colonel	February 1, 1976
Lieutenant colonel	July 9, 1970
Major	May 24, 1966
Captain	June 2, 1962
First lieutenant	December 30, 1959
Second lieutenant	June 9, 1958

== Political campaigning ==
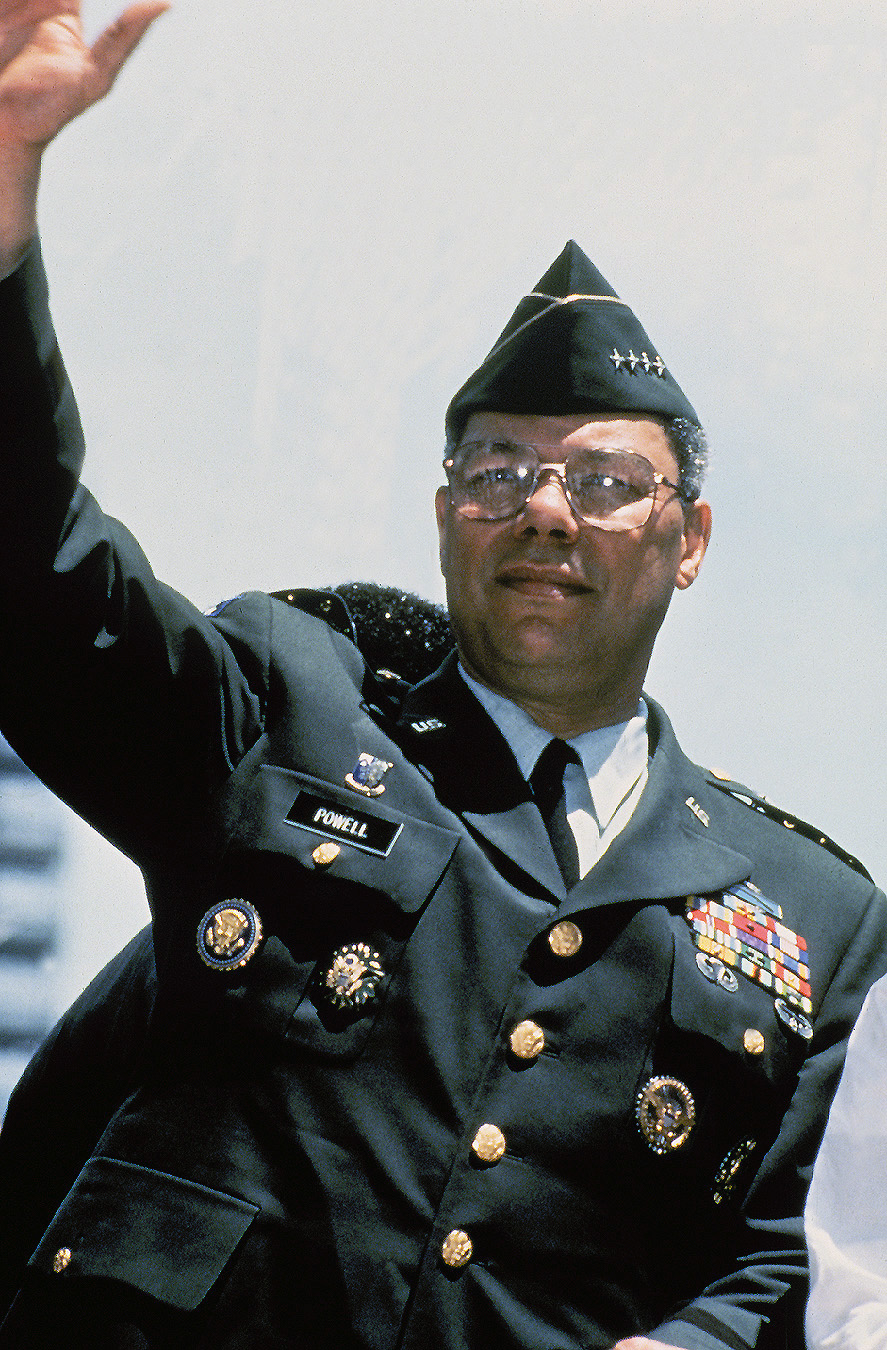
Powell, as chairman of the Joint Chiefs of Staff, waves from his motorcade during the Persian Gulf War Welcome Home Parade in New York City.

Powell's experience in military matters made him a very popular figure with both American political parties. Many Democrats admired his moderate stance on military matters, while many Republicans saw him as a great asset associated with the successes of past Republican administrations. Put forth as a potential Democratic vice presidential nominee in the 1992 U.S. presidential election or even potentially replacing Vice President Dan Quayle as the Republican vice presidential nominee, Powell eventually declared himself a Republican and began to campaign for Republican candidates in 1995. He was touted as a possible opponent of Bill Clinton in the 1996 U.S. presidential election, possibly capitalizing on a split conservative vote in Iowa and even leading New Hampshire polls for the GOP nomination, but Powell declined, citing a lack of passion for politics. Powell defeated Clinton 50–38 in a hypothetical match-up proposed to voters in the exit polls conducted on Election Day. Despite not standing in the race, Powell won the Republican New Hampshire Vice-Presidential primary on write-in votes.

In 1997, Powell founded America's Promise with the objective of helping children from all socioeconomic sectors. That same year saw the establishment of The Colin L. Powell Center for Leadership and Service. The mission of the center is to "prepare new generations of publicly engaged leaders from populations previously underrepresented in public service and policy circles, to build a strong culture of civic engagement at City College, and to mobilize campus resources to meet pressing community needs and serve the public good".

Powell was mentioned as a potential candidate in the 2000 U.S. presidential election, but again decided against running. Once Texas governor George W. Bush secured the Republican nomination, Powell endorsed him for president and spoke at the 2000 Republican National Convention. Bush won the general election and appointed Powell as secretary of state in 2001.

In the electoral college vote count of 2016, Powell received three votes for president from faithless electors from the state of Washington.

== Secretary of State (2001–2005) ==
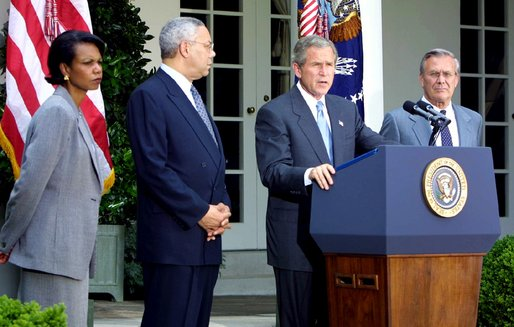
Powell, National Security Advisor Condoleezza Rice and Secretary of Defense Donald Rumsfeld listen to President George W. Bush speak.

President-elect George W. Bush named Powell as his nominee to be secretary of state in a ceremony at his ranch in Crawford, Texas on December 16, 2000. This made Powell the first person to formally accept a Cabinet post in the Bush administration, as well the first Black United States secretary of state. As secretary of state, Powell was perceived as moderate. Powell was unanimously confirmed by the United States Senate by voice vote on January 20, 2001, and ceremonially sworn in on January 26. Over the course of his tenure he traveled less than any other U.S. Secretary of State in 30 years. This is partly attributed to a letter from former diplomat George F. Kennan, who advised Powell to focus on his duties as the president's principal foreign policy advisor and avoid trips that risked undercutting the duties of the ambassadors.

On September 11, 2001, Powell was in Lima, Peru, meeting with president Alejandro Toledo and attending a meeting of foreign ministers of the Organization of American States. After the terror attacks that day, Powell's job became of critical importance in managing the United States of America's relationships with foreign countries to secure a stable coalition in the war on terrorism. Powell’s diplomatic skills led to immediate consensus, and the Inter-American Democratic Charter was approved by acclamation on September 11, 2001. The charter is regarded as one of the most comprehensive inter-American documents, created to promote and strengthen democratic ideas, practices, and culture among the states of the Americas.

=== 2003 U.S. invasion of Iraq ===
My second purpose today is ... to share with you what the United States knows about Iraq's weapons of mass destruction ... Iraq's behavior demonstrate that Saddam Hussein and his regime have made no effort ... to disarm as required by the international community. Indeed, the facts and Iraq's behavior show that Saddam Hussein and his regime are concealing their efforts to produce more weapons of mass destruction ... every statement I make today is backed up by sources, solid sources. These are not assertions. What we're giving you are facts and conclusions based on solid intelligence.

— Colin Powell, Address to the United Nations Security Council

Powell came under fire for his role in building the case for the 2003 invasion of Iraq. A 2004 report by the Iraq Survey Group concluded that the evidence that Powell offered to support the allegation that the Iraqi government possessed weapons of mass destruction (WMDs) was inaccurate. As early as 2000 on the day Powell was nominated to be Secretary of State he told the press "Saddam is sitting on a failed regime that is not going to be around in a few years time".

In a press statement on February 24, 2001, Powell had said that sanctions against Iraq had prevented the development of any weapons of mass destruction by Saddam Hussein. Powell favored involving the international community in the invasion, as opposed to a unilateral approach.

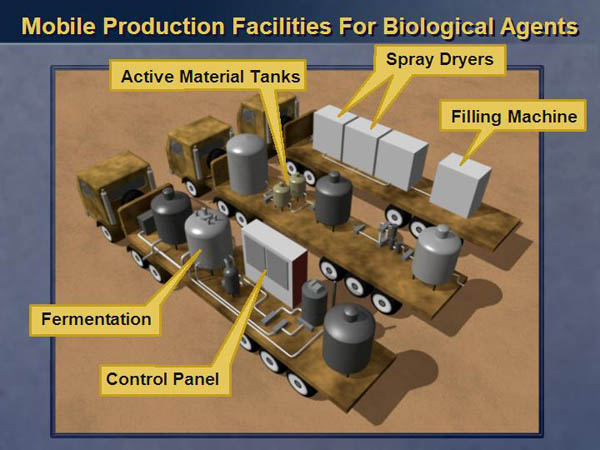
Computer-generated image of an alleged mobile production facility for biological weapons, presented by Powell at the UN Security Council. On May 27, 2003, U.S. and British experts examined the trailers and declared they had nothing to do with biological weapons.

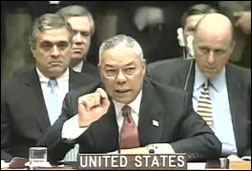
Powell holding a model vial of anthrax while giving a presentation to the United Nations Security Council in February 2003

Powell's chief role was to garner international support for a multi-national coalition to mount the invasion. To this end, Powell addressed a plenary session of the United Nations Security Council on February 5, 2003, to argue in favor of military action. Citing numerous anonymous Iraqi defectors, Powell asserted that "there can be no doubt that Saddam Hussein has biological weapons and the capability to rapidly produce more, many more". Powell also stated that there was "no doubt in my mind" that Saddam was working to obtain key components to produce nuclear weapons. Powell stated that he gave his speech to the UN on "four days' notice".

Britain's Channel 4 News reported soon afterwards that a British intelligence dossier that Powell had referred to as a "fine paper" during his presentation had been based on old material and a plagiarized essay by American graduate student Ibrahim al-Marashi.

A Senate report on intelligence failures would later detail the intense debate that went on behind the scenes on what to include in Powell's speech. State Department analysts had found dozens of factual problems in drafts of the speech. Some of the claims were taken out, but others were left in, such as claims based on the yellowcake forgery. The administration came under fire for having acted on faulty intelligence, particularly that which was single-sourced to the informant known as Curveball. Powell later recounted how Vice President Dick Cheney had joked with him before he gave the speech, telling him, "You've got high poll ratings; you can afford to lose a few points". Powell's longtime aide-de-camp and Chief of Staff from 1989 to 2003, Colonel Lawrence Wilkerson, later characterized Cheney's view of Powell's mission as to "go up there and sell it, and we'll have moved forward a peg or two. Fall on your damn sword and kill yourself, and I'll be happy, too".

In September 2005, Powell was asked about the speech during an interview with Barbara Walters and responded that it was a "blot" on his record. He went on to say, "It will always be a part of my record. It was painful. It's painful now".

Wilkerson later said that he inadvertently participated in a hoax on the American people in preparing Powell's erroneous testimony before the United Nations Security Council.

As recounted in Soldier: The Life of Colin Powell, in 2001 before 9/11, Richard A. Clarke, a National Security Council holdover from the Clinton administration, pushed the new Bush administration for action against al-Qaeda in Afghanistan, a move opposed by Paul Wolfowitz who advocated for the creation of a "U.S.-protected, opposition-run 'liberated' enclave around the southern Iraqi city of Basra". Powell referred to Wolfowitz and other top members of Donald Rumsfeld's staff "as the 'JINSA crowd,' " in reference to the pro-Israel Jewish Institute for National Security Affairs. Again invoking "the JINSA crowd" Powell also attributed the decision to go to war in Iraq in 2003 to the neoconservative belief that regime change in Baghdad "was a first and necessary stop on the road to peace in Jerusalem".

A review of Soldier by Tim Rutten criticized Powell's remarks as a "blot on his record", accusing Powell of slandering "neoconservatives in the Defense Department—nearly all of them Jews" with "old and wholly unmeritorious allegations of dual loyalty". A 2007 article about fears that Jewish groups "will be accused of driving America into a war with the regime in Tehran" cited the DeYoung biography and quoted JINSA's then-executive director, Thomas Neumann, as "surprised" Powell "would single out a Jewish group when naming those who supported the war". Neumann said, "I am not accusing Powell of anything, but these are words that the antisemites will use in the future".

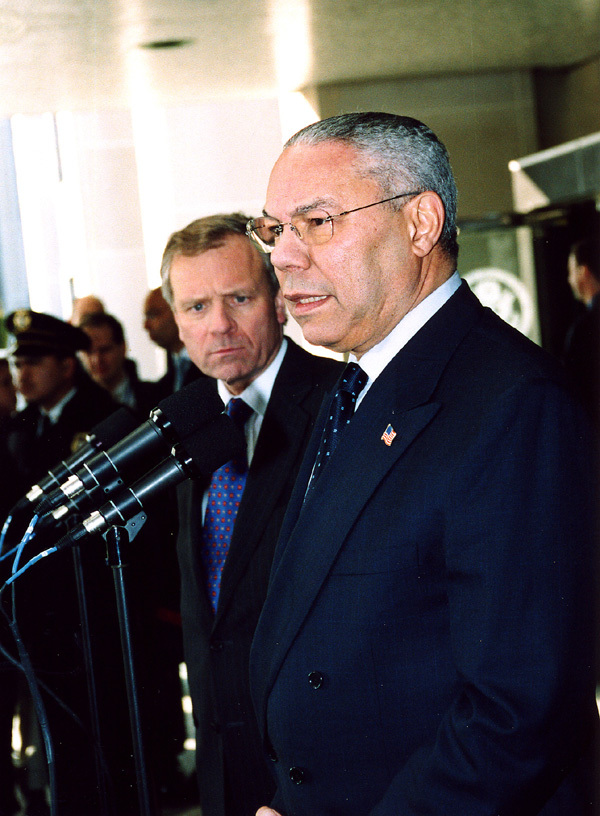
Secretary Powell with NATO Secretary General Jaap de Hoop Scheffer

Once Saddam Hussein had been deposed, Powell's renewed role was to once again establish a working international coalition, this time to assist in the rebuilding of post-war Iraq. On September 13, 2004, Powell testified before the Senate Governmental Affairs Committee, acknowledging that the sources who provided much of the information in his February 2003 UN presentation were "wrong" and that it was "unlikely" that any stockpiles of WMDs would be found. Claiming that he was unaware that some intelligence officials questioned the information prior to his presentation, Powell pushed for reform in the intelligence community, including the creation of a national intelligence director who would assure that "what one person knew, everyone else knew".

=== Other foreign policy issues ===
Additionally, Powell was critical of other aspects of U.S. foreign policy in the past, such as its support for the 1973 Chilean coup d'état that deposed the democratically elected president Salvador Allende in favor of Augusto Pinochet. From two separate interviews in 2003, Powell stated in one about the 1973 event: "I can't justify or explain the actions and decisions that were made at that time. It was a different time. There was a great deal of concern about communism in this part of the world. Communism was a threat to the democracies in this part of the world. It was a threat to the United States". In another interview, he also simply stated: "With respect to your earlier comment about Chile in the 1970s and what happened with Mr. Allende, it is not a part of American history that we're proud of."

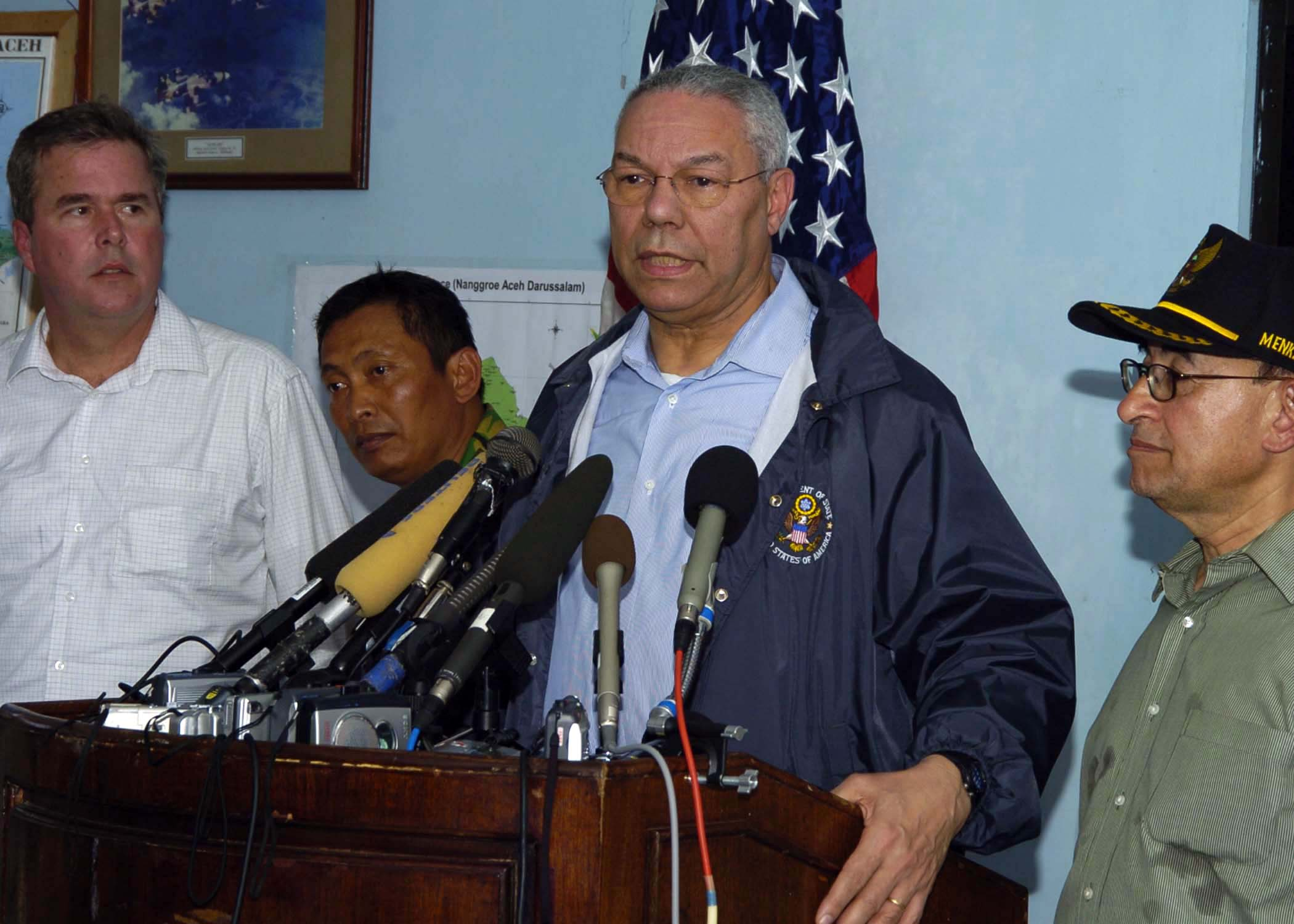
Powell in Banda Aceh speaking on United States's involvement in recovery efforts following the 2004 Indian Ocean earthquake and tsunami with Alwi Shihab wearing green

In the Hainan Island incident of April 1, 2001, a United States US EP-3 surveillance aircraft collided mid-air with a Chinese Shenyang J-8 jet fighter over the South China Sea. While somewhat ambiguous, Powell's expression of "very sorry" was accepted as sufficient for the formal apology that China had sought. The incident was nonetheless a serious flare-up in United States-China relations and created negative feelings towards the United States by the Chinese public and increased public feelings of Chinese nationalism.

In September 2004, Powell described the Darfur genocide as "genocide", thus becoming the first cabinet member to apply the term "genocide" to events in an ongoing conflict.

In November, according to Walter LaFeber, Bush "forced Powell to resign". Powell announced his resignation as Secretary of State on November 15, 2004, shortly after Bush was reelected. Bush's desire for Powell to resign was communicated to Powell via a phone call by Bush's chief of staff, Andrew Card. The following day, Bush nominated National Security Advisor Condoleezza Rice as Powell's successor.

In mid-November, Powell stated that he had seen new evidence suggesting that Iran was adapting missiles for a nuclear delivery system. The accusation came at the same time as the settlement of an agreement between Iran, the IAEA, and the European Union.

Although biographer Jeffrey J. Matthews is highly critical of how Powell misled the United Nations Security Council regarding weapons of mass destruction in Iraq, he credits Powell with a series of achievements at the State Department. These include restoration of morale to psychologically demoralized professional diplomats, leadership of the international HIV/AIDS initiative, resolving a crisis with China, and blocking efforts to tie Saddam Hussein to the 9/11 attacks on the United States.

== Later life ==
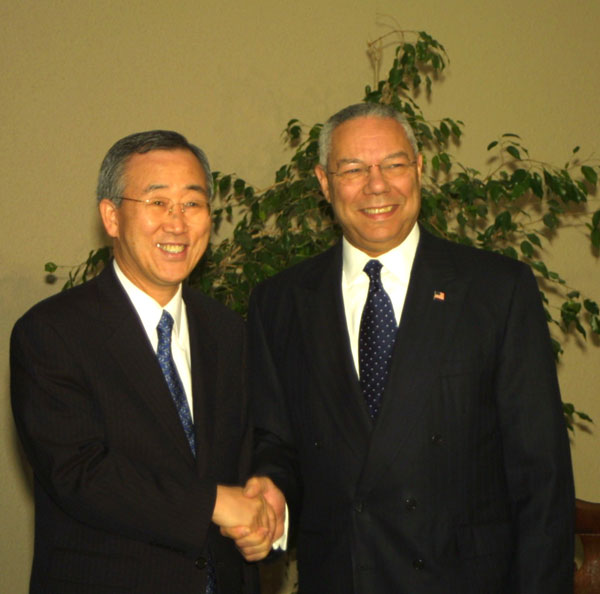
Powell with Ban Ki-moon, 2004

After retiring from the role of Secretary of State, Powell returned to private life. In April 2005, he was privately telephoned by Republican senators Lincoln Chafee and Chuck Hagel. At the time, Powell expressed reservations and mixed reviews about the nomination of John Bolton as ambassador to the United Nations. Powell had clashed with Bolton during Bush's first term, but refrained from advising the senators Chafee and Hagel to oppose Bolton's nomination. His comments were viewed as potentially dealing significant damage to Bolton's chances of confirmation. Bolton was put into the position via a recess appointment because of the strong opposition in the Senate. On April 28, an opinion piece in The Guardian by Sidney Blumenthal, claimed that Powell was in fact "conducting a campaign" against Bolton because of the acrimonious battles they had had while working together, which among other things had resulted in Powell cutting Bolton out of talks with Iran and Libya after complaints about Bolton's involvement from the British. Blumenthal added that "The foreign relations committee has discovered that Bolton made a highly unusual request and gained access to 10 intercepts by the National Security Agency. Staff members on the committee believe that Bolton was probably spying on Powell, his senior advisors and other officials reporting to him on diplomatic initiatives that Bolton opposed".

In September 2005, Powell criticized the response to Hurricane Katrina, and said thousands of people were not properly protected because they were poor, rather than because they were Black.

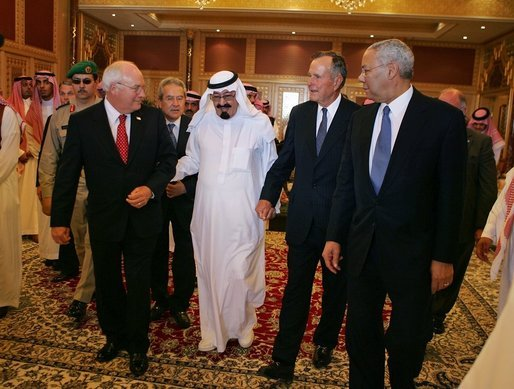
Powell walks with newly crowned King Abdullah of Saudi Arabia, Vice President Dick Cheney, and former President George H. W. Bush, Saudi Arabia, August 2005

On January 5, 2006, he participated in a meeting at the White House of former Secretaries of Defense and State to discuss United States foreign policy with Bush administration officials. In September 2006, Powell sided with more moderate Senate Republicans in supporting more rights for detainees and opposing President Bush's terrorism bill. He backed Senators John Warner, John McCain, and Lindsey Graham in their statement that U.S. military and intelligence personnel in future wars will suffer for abuses committed in 2006 by the U.S. in the name of fighting terrorism. Powell stated that "The world is beginning to doubt the moral basis of our fight against terrorism".

In 2007, he joined the board of directors of Steve Case's new company Revolution Health. Powell also served on the Council on Foreign Relations Board of directors. In 2008, Powell served as a spokesperson for National Mentoring Month, a campaign held each January to recruit volunteer mentors for at-risk youth. Soon after Barack Obama's 2008 election, Powell began being mentioned as a possible cabinet member. He was not nominated. In September 2009, Powell advised President Obama against surging U.S. forces in Afghanistan. The president announced the surge the following December.

In 2010, Powell joined the Smithsonian advisory council. Together with his wife, Alma Powell, they are the founding donors who offer their support to the museum's capital campaign and Living History campaign. He was an advocate for the National Museum of African American History and Culture. In March 2014, Salesforce.com announced that Powell had joined its board of directors.

=== Death ===
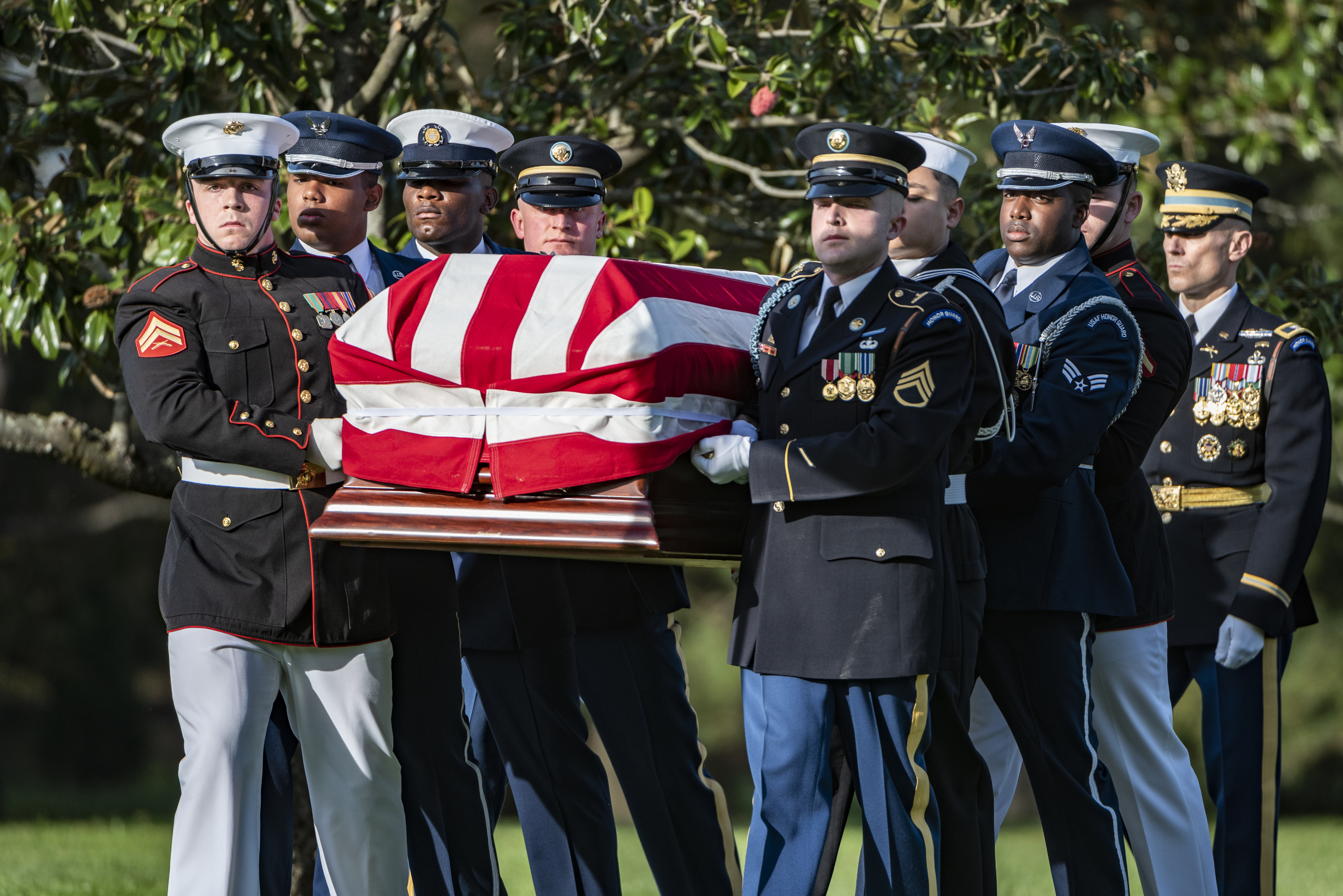
Powell's coffin is carried by an Armed Forces body bearer team at his funeral on November 5, 2021.

On October 18, 2021, Powell, who was being treated for multiple myeloma, died at Walter Reed National Military Medical Center of complications from COVID-19 at the age of 84. He had been vaccinated, but his myeloma compromised his immune system; he also had early-stage Parkinson's disease.

Present at the funeral service at the Washington National Cathedral were President Biden and former presidents Barack Obama and George W. Bush, along with First Lady Jill Biden and former first ladies Michelle Obama, Laura Bush, and Hillary Clinton (also representing her husband, former president Bill Clinton, who was unable to attend following treatment for sepsis) as well as many other dignitaries.

Powell is buried at Arlington National Cemetery in Section 60, Grave 11917.

==== Reactions ====
Following his death, a wave of bipartisan grief poured out in tribute of him.

Joe Biden and four of the five living former presidents, Barack Obama, George W Bush, Bill Clinton, and Jimmy Carter, issued statements revering Powell. Joe Biden hailed Powell as a "dear friend" and a "patriot of unmatched honor and dignity." He added that Powell "embodied the highest ideals of both warrior and diplomat." Barack Obama called him an example of "what America—and Americans—can and should be." He praised how Powell never denied the role race played in his life while refusing to let it limit his dreams. George W. Bush expressed personal grief, calling him a "great public servant" and noting that multiple presidents relied on Powell's counsel, recognizing his roles as National Security Adviser under Ronald Reagan, Chairman of the Joint Chiefs of Staff under George H. W. Bush and Bill Clinton, and Secretary of State during his own administration. Former vice president Dick Cheney, despite their well-documented bitter policy disagreements, lauded Powell as a "trailblazer and role model" for his rise to high office, ultimately calling his "unparalleled record of service" unforgettable and was "deeply saddened to learn that America has lost a leader and statesman." Additionally remarking: "[Powell] loved his country and served her long and well." Vice President Mike Pence additionally praised Powell, calling him “a true American Patriot who served our Nation with distinction.”

Several generals and public officials additionally expressed their grief, including Lloyd Austin, the current Secretary of Defense at the time, stated that the world lost "one of the greatest leaders that we have ever witnessed." He added that he felt "a hole in my heart" over losing a close personal mentor. Antony Blinken, then Secretary of State, noted that Powell was "beloved here at the State Department" and praised how he preferred simple lunches and abhorred empty formalities.

Donald Trump broke from the prevailing bipartisan praise, issuing a highly critical, backhanded statement slamming Powell as a "classic RINO." Trump explicitly focused on Powell's controversial 2003 speech to the United Nations, writing that Powell "made big mistakes on Iraq and famously, so-called weapons of mass destruction." He used the statement to mock the press, saying it was "wonderful to see [Powell]... be treated in death so beautifully by the Fake News Media." He sarcastically added, "Hope that happens to me someday." Additionally he complained that Powell was "always being the first to attack other Republicans." He ended the message with a brief, dismissive sign-off: "He made plenty of mistakes, but anyway, may he rest in peace!"

== Political positions ==
Powell condemns President Trump for the January 6 United States Capitol attack
- TODAY interview on NBC with Powell calling for President Trump's resignation, 8 January 2021, TODAY

During his early political career through his tenure within the Joint Chiefs of Staff, Powell was an independent. Powell was a moderate Republican from 1995 until 2021. In 2021, Powell recanted his status as a Republican following the storming of the United States Capitol on January 6. The attack moved Powell to call for President Trump's resignation, noting: "I wish he would do what Nixon did and just step down. Somebody ought to go up to him and it's over". Powell also accused Trump of attempting to "overthrow the government", and that Trump's false claims of a stolen election were "dangerous for our democracy". Powell was pro-choice regarding abortion, and expressed some support for an assault weapons ban. He stated in his autobiography that he supported affirmative action that levels the playing field, without giving a leg up to undeserving persons because of racial issues. Powell originally suggested the don't ask, don't tell policy to President Clinton, though he later supported its repeal as proposed by Robert Gates and Admiral Mike Mullen in January 2010, saying "circumstances had changed".

Powell on My American Journey
- Booknotes interview with Powell on My American Journey, 7 January 1996, C-SPAN

Powell gained attention in 2004 when, in a conversation with British Foreign Secretary Jack Straw, he reportedly referred to neoconservatives within the Bush administration as "fucking crazies".

In a September 2006 letter to John McCain, Powell expressed opposition to President Bush's push for military tribunals of those formerly and currently classified as enemy combatants. Specifically, he objected to the effort in Congress to "redefine Common Article 3 of the Geneva Convention". He also asserted: "The world is beginning to doubt the moral basis of our fight against terrorism".

=== Defending the Iraq War ===
At the 2007 Aspen Ideas Festival in Colorado, Powell stated that he had spent two and a half hours explaining to President Bush "the consequences of going into an Arab country and becoming the occupiers". During this discussion, he insisted that the U.S. appeal to the United Nations first, but if diplomacy failed, he would support the invasion: "I also had to say to him that you are the President, you will have to make the ultimate judgment, and if the judgment is this isn't working and we don't think it is going to solve the problem, then if military action is undertaken I'm with you, I support you".

In a 2008 interview on CNN, Powell reiterated his support for the 2003 decision to invade Iraq in the context of his endorsement of Barack Obama, stating: "My role has been very, very straightforward. I wanted to avoid a war. The president [Bush] agreed with me. We tried to do that. We couldn't get it through the U.N. and when the president made the decision, I supported that decision. And I've never blinked from that. I've never said I didn't support a decision to go to war".

Powell's position on the Iraq War troop surge of 2007 was less consistent. In December 2006, he expressed skepticism that the strategy would work and whether the U.S. military had enough troops to carry it out successfully. He stated: "I am not persuaded that another surge of troops into Baghdad for the purposes of suppressing this communitarian violence, this civil war, will work". Following his endorsement of Barack Obama in October 2008, however, Powell praised General David Petraeus and U.S. troops, as well as the Iraqi government, concluding that "it's starting to turn around". By mid-2009, he had concluded a surge of U.S. forces in Iraq should have come sooner, perhaps in late 2003.

=== Endorsement of Barack Obama ===
Powell donated the maximum allowable amount to John McCain's campaign in the summer of 2007 and in early 2008, his name was listed as a possible running mate for Republican nominee McCain's bid during the 2008 U.S. presidential election.

McCain won the Republican presidential nomination, but the Democrats nominated the first Black candidate, Senator Barack Obama of Illinois. On October 19, 2008, Powell announced his endorsement of Obama during a Meet the Press interview, citing "his ability to inspire, because of the inclusive nature of his campaign, because he is reaching out all across America, because of who he is and his rhetorical abilities", in addition to his "style and substance". He additionally referred to Obama as a "transformational figure". Powell further questioned McCain's judgment in appointing Sarah Palin as the vice presidential candidate, stating that despite the fact that she is admired, "now that we have had a chance to watch her for some seven weeks, I don't believe she's ready to be president of the United States, which is the job of the vice president". He said that Obama's choice for vice president, Joe Biden, was ready to be president. He also added that he was "troubled" by the "false intimations that Obama was Muslim". Powell stated that "[Obama] is a Christian – he's always been a Christian... But the really right answer is, what if he is? Is there something wrong with being a Muslim in this country? The answer's no, that's not America". Powell then mentioned Kareem Rashad Sultan Khan, a Muslim American soldier in the U.S. Army who served and died in the Iraq War. He later stated, "Over the last seven weeks, the approach of the Republican Party has become narrower and narrower [...] I look at these kind of approaches to the campaign, and they trouble me". Powell concluded his Sunday morning talk show comments with "It isn't easy for me to disappoint Sen. McCain in the way that I have this morning, and I regret that [...] I think we need a transformational figure. I think we need a president who is a generational change and that's why I'm supporting Barack Obama, not out of any lack of respect or admiration for Sen. John McCain". Later in a December 12, 2008, CNN interview with Fareed Zakaria, Powell reiterated his belief that during the last few months of the campaign, Palin pushed the Republican party further to the right and had a polarizing impact on it.

When asked why he was still a Republican on Meet the Press he said, "I'm still a Republican. And I think the Republican Party needs me more than the Democratic Party needs me. And you can be a Republican and still feel strongly about issues such as immigration, and improving our education system, and doing something about some of the social problems that exist in our society and our country. I don't think there's anything inconsistent with this".

=== Views on the Obama administration ===
In a July 2009 CNN interview with John King, Powell expressed concern over President Obama increasing the size of the federal government and the size of the federal budget deficit. In September 2010, he criticized the Obama administration for not focusing "like a razor blade" on the economy and job creation. Powell reiterated that Obama was a "transformational figure". In a video that aired on CNN.com in November 2011, Colin Powell said in reference to Barack Obama, "many of his decisions have been quite sound. The financial system was put back on a stable basis".

On October 25, 2012, 12 days before the presidential election, he gave his endorsement to President Obama for re-election during a broadcast of CBS This Morning. He considered the administration to have had success and achieved progress in foreign and domestic policy arenas. As additional reasons for his endorsement, Powell cited the changing positions and perceived lack of thoughtfulness of Mitt Romney on foreign affairs, and a concern for the validity of Romney's economic plans.

In an interview with ABC's Diane Sawyer and George Stephanopoulos during ABC's coverage of President Obama's second inauguration, Powell criticized members of the Republican Party who spread "things that demonize the president". He called on GOP leaders to publicly denounce such talk.

=== 2016 e-mail leaks and criticism of Donald Trump ===
Powell was vocal about the state of the Republican Party. Speaking at a Washington Ideas forum in 2015, he warned the audience that the Republican Party had begun a move to the fringe right, lessening the chances of a Republican presidency in the future. On Republican presidential candidate Donald Trump's statements regarding immigrants, Powell noted there were many immigrants working in Trump hotels.

Powell denounced the "nastiness" of the 2016 Republican primaries. He compared the race to reality television, and said the campaign had gone "into the mud".

Powell accused the Hillary Clinton campaign of trying to pin her email controversy on him. Speaking to People magazine, Powell said "she was using [the private email server] for a year before I sent her a memo telling her what I did".

On September 13, 2016, emails were obtained that revealed Powell's private communications regarding both Donald Trump and Hillary Clinton. Powell privately reiterated his comments regarding Clinton's email scandal, writing, "I have told Hillary's minions repeatedly that they are making a mistake trying to drag me in, yet they still try", and complaining that "Hillary's mafia keeps trying to suck me into it". In another email, Powell said she should have told everyone what she did "two years ago", and said that she has not "been covering herself with glory". Writing on the 2012 Benghazi attack controversy surrounding Clinton, Powell said to then U.S. Ambassador Susan Rice, "Benghazi is a stupid witch hunt". Commenting on Clinton in a general sense, he mused that "Everything HRC touches she kind of screws up with hubris", and "I would rather not have to vote for her, although she is a friend I respect". Powell publicly endorsed Clinton on October 25, 2016, "because I think she's qualified, and the other gentleman is not qualified". In private emails, Powell called Donald Trump a "national disgrace" with "no sense of shame". He wrote of Trump's role in the birther movement, which he called "racist". He suggested the media ignore Trump: "To go on and call him an idiot just emboldens him". The emails were obtained by the media as the result of a hack.

Despite not running in the 2016 federal elections, Powell received three electoral votes for president from faithless electors in Washington who had pledged to vote for Clinton, coming in third overall. After Barack Obama, he was the second Black person to receive electoral votes in a presidential election.

=== Views on the Trump administration ===
In an interview in October 2019, Powell warned that the GOP needed to "get a grip" and put the country before their party, standing up to President Trump rather than worrying about political fallout. He said: "When they see things that are not right, they need to say something about it because our foreign policy is in shambles right now, in my humble judgment, and I see things happening that are hard to understand". On June 7, 2020, Powell announced he would be voting for former vice president Joe Biden in the 2020 United States presidential election. In August, Powell delivered a speech in support of Biden's candidacy at the 2020 Democratic National Convention.

In January 2021, after the Capitol building was attacked by Trump supporters, Powell told CNN's Fareed Zakaria: "I can no longer call myself a fellow Republican".

== Personal life ==
=== Ancestry ===
He was a descendant of Eyre Coote, a general in the British Army and governor of Jamaica who had a liaison with Colins’ enslaved ancestor Sally. Powell was a first cousin twice removed of Fall Out Boy bassist and lyricist Pete Wentz; Wentz's maternal grandfather, Arthur Winston Lewis, was Powell's first cousin.

=== Relationships ===
Powell married Alma Johnson on August 25, 1962. Both were Episcopalian. Their son, Michael Powell, served as the chairman of the Federal Communications Commission (FCC) from 2001 to 2005. Their daughter is actress Linda Powell.

In 2013, he faced questions about his relationship with the Romanian diplomat Corina Crețu, after a hacked AOL email account had been made public. He acknowledged a "very personal" email relationship but denied further involvement.

=== Hobbies ===
Powell enjoyed restoring old Volvo and Saab automobiles. Powell also collected fine pens and stationery. Additionally, he read books on history and military strategy, including Ulysses S. Grant's Personal Memoirs of U. S. Grant and Dean Acheson's Present at the Creation,T.R. Fehrenbach’s This Kind of War, and David Halberstam's The Best and the Brightest, which Powell said he would require presidents and heads of states to read.

=== Estate ===
For nearly three decades, Powell lived in an expansive, colonial-style mansion located in Ballantrae Farms in McLean, Virginia, a luxury suburb just outside Washington, D.C. He bought the home in 1993 after retiring from the military. It spans nearly 6,000 square feet (560 m^{2}) on roughly an acre of land. Following his death, the Powell family sold the estate to a private buyer for $2.8 million. Powell kept a framed photograph of his childhood home in Queens, New York, sitting right on the desk of his study.

== Awards and honors ==
=== Military awards and decorations ===
==== Badges ====
Combat Infantryman Badge

Expert Infantryman Badge

Ranger Tab

Parachutist Badge

Pathfinder Badge

Air Assault Badge

Presidential Service Badge

Secretary of Defense Identification Badge

Joint Chiefs of Staff Identification Badge

Army Staff Identification Badge

==== Medals and ribbons ====
	Defense Distinguished Service Medal with three oak leaf clusters
	Army Distinguished Service Medal with oak leaf cluster
	Navy Distinguished Service Medal
	Air Force Distinguished Service Medal
	Coast Guard Distinguished Service Medal
	Defense Superior Service Medal
	Legion of Merit with oak leaf cluster
	Soldier's Medal
	Bronze Star Medal
	Purple Heart
	Air Medal
	Joint Service Commendation Medal
	Army Commendation Medal with two oak leaf clusters
	Presidential Medal of Freedom with Distinction (1993)
	Presidential Medal of Freedom (1991)
	Presidential Citizens Medal
	Secretary's Distinguished Service Award
	National Defense Service Medal with bronze service star
	Vietnam Service Medal with silver service star
	Army Service Ribbon
	Army Overseas Service Ribbon with award numeral 4
—N/a	Gerald R. Ford Medal for Distinguished Public Service (2021)

==== Foreign decorations ====
Honorary Knight Commander of the Order of the Bath (KCB) (United Kingdom)
Légion d'honneur, Grand Cross (France)
Meritorious Service Cross (M.S.C.) (Canada)
Skanderbeg's Order (Albania)
Order of Stara Planina in the First Order (Bulgaria)
Republic of Vietnam Gallantry Cross Unit Citation
Republic of Vietnam Campaign Medal
National Order of the Lion, Grand Officer (Senegal)

=== Civilian awards and honors ===
Colin Powell
- Crest: The head of an American bald-headed eagle erased, the erasure per bend sinister Proper.
- Shield: Azure, two swords in saltire points downwards between four mullets Argent, on a chief of the Second a lion passant Gules.
- Motto: Devoted To Public Service
- The coat of arms of Colin Powell was granted by the Lord Lyon in Edinburgh on February 3, 2004. Technically the grant was to Powell's father (a British subject) to be passed on by descent. Scotland's King of Arms is traditionally responsible for granting arms to Commonwealth citizens of Scottish descent. The swords and stars refer to the former general's career, as does the crest, which is the badge of the 101st Airborne (which he served as a brigade commander in the mid-1970s). The lion may be an allusion to Scotland. The shield can be shown surrounded by the insignia of an honorary Knight Commander of the Most Honorable Order of the Bath (KCB), an award the General received after the first Gulf War.

Powell's civilian awards include two Presidential Medals of Freedom (the second with distinction), the Congressional Gold Medal, and the Ronald Reagan Freedom Award.

- In 1988, Powell received the Golden Plate Award of the American Academy of Achievement.
- In 1990, Powell received the U.S. Senator John Heinz Award for Greatest Public Service by an Elected or Appointed Official, an award given out annually by Jefferson Awards.
- In 1991, Powell was awarded the Presidential Medal of Freedom by President George H. W. Bush.
- In 1991, Powell was awarded the Spingarn Medal from the NAACP.
- In 1991, Powell was inducted into the Horatio Alger Association of Distinguished Americans.
- On April 23, 1991, Powell was awarded the Congressional Gold Medal "in recognition of his exemplary performance as a military leader and advisor to the President in planning and coordinating the military response of the United States to the Iraqi invasion of Kuwait and the ultimate retreat and defeat of Iraqi forces and Iraqi acceptance of all United Nations Resolutions relating to Kuwait".
- On September 30, 1993, Powell was awarded his second Presidential Medal of Freedom, this time with the additional "with distinction" by President Bill Clinton.
- On November 9, 1993, Powell was awarded the second Ronald Reagan Freedom Award, by Ronald Reagan. Powell served as Reagan's National Security Advisor from 1987 to 1989.
- In 1993, Colin Powell was created an honorary Knight Commander of the Order of the Bath by Queen Elizabeth II of the United Kingdom.
- In 1998, he was awarded the Sylvanus Thayer Award by the United States Military Academy for his commitment to the ideals of "Duty, Honor, Country".
- In 1998, he was elected to the American Philosophical Society
- The 2002 Liberty Medal was awarded to Colin Powell on July 4 in Philadelphia, Pennsylvania. In his acceptance speech, Powell reminded Americans that "It is for America, the Land of the Free and the Home of the Brave, to help freedom ring across the globe, unto all the peoples thereof. That is our solemn obligation, and we will not fail".
- In 2003, an elementary school named after Powell was opened in Centreville, Virginia. Powell visited the school in 2013.
- In 2005, Powell received the Bishop John T. Walker Distinguished Humanitarian Service Award for his contributions to Africa.
- Powell received the 2006 AARP Andrus Award, the Association's highest honor.
- In 2005, Colin and Alma Powell were awarded the Woodrow Wilson Award for Public Service by the Woodrow Wilson International Center for Scholars of the Smithsonian Institution.

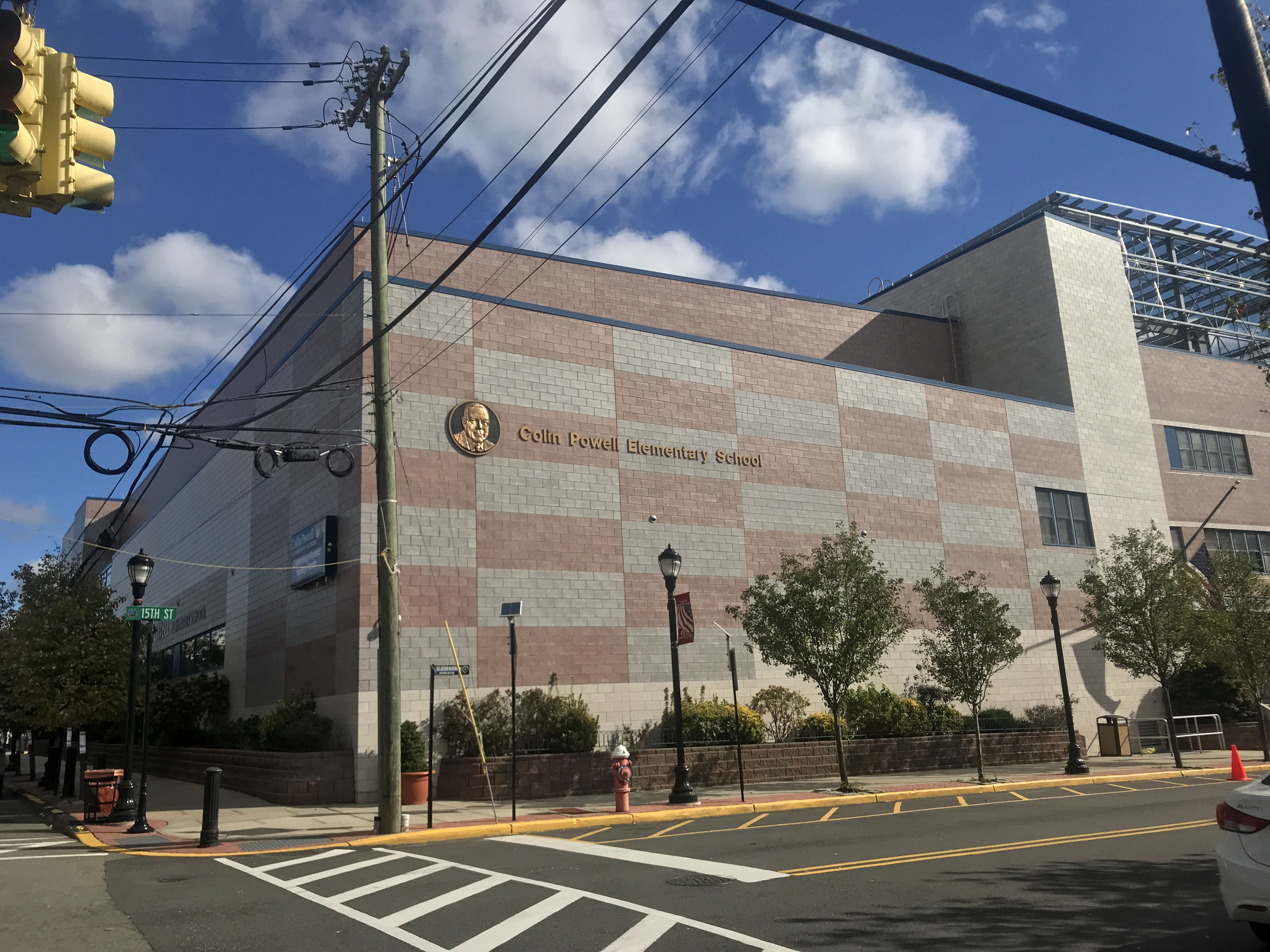
Colin Powell Elementary School in Union City, New Jersey, on October 18, 2021, the day Powell died

- Powell was a recipient of the Silver Buffalo Award, the highest adult award given by the Boy Scouts of America.
- A street in Gelnhausen, Germany, was named after him: "General-Colin-Powell-Straße".
- In 2002, scholar Molefi Kete Asante listed Colin Powell on his list of 100 Greatest Blacks in America.
- In 2009, an elementary school named for Colin Powell opened in El Paso. It is in the El Paso Independent School District, located on Fort Bliss property, and serves a portion of Fort Bliss.
- In 2009, Powell was elected to the American Academy of Arts and Sciences
- Powell was an honorary board member of the humanitarian organization Wings of Hope
- From 2006, he was the chairman of the Board of Trustees for Eisenhower Fellowships.
- In 2006, The Harry S. Truman Research Institute for the Advancement of Peace at The Hebrew University of Jerusalem awarded Colin Powell with the Truman Peace Prize for his efforts to conduct the "war against terrorism", through diplomatic as well as military means, and to avert regional and civil conflicts in many parts of the world.
- In September 2012, Union City, New Jersey, opened Colin Powell Elementary School, which was named after Powell, and which was dedicated on February 7, 2013, with governor Chris Christie in attendance. Powell himself visited the school on June 4, 2013.
- In 2014, Colin Powell was named to the National Board of Advisors for High Point University.
- In 2024, Prince George's County Public Schools opened Colin L. Powell Academy, named after Powell, in Fort Washington, Maryland.

== See also ==
- Conservatism in the United States
- List of African-American United States Cabinet members
- List of American conservatives
- List of United States secretaries of state
- Plame affair – 2003 American political scandal
- Pottery Barn rule – Store policy on damage of goods by customers
- Republican and conservative support for Barack Obama in 2008

== Sources ==
- DeYoung, Karen (2006a). Soldier: The Life of Colin Powell. Alfred A. Knopf. ISBN 1-4000-4170-8. OCLC 71313158.
- LaFeber, Walter (2009). "The Rise and Fall of Colin Powell and the Powell Doctrine". Political Science Quarterly. 124: 71–93. doi:10.1002/j.1538-165X.2009.tb00642.x.
- Matthews, Jeffrey J. (2019). Colin Powell: Imperfect Patriot. University of Notre Dame Press. ISBN 978-0-268-10512-9. OCLC 1077560739.
- O'Sullivan, Christopher (2010). Colin Powell: A Political Biography. Lanham, Maryland: Rowman & Littlefield. ISBN 978-0-7425-5187-9.
- Powell, Colin L.; Persico, Joseph E. (1995). My American Journey. Random House. ISBN 978-0307763686. OCLC 7059263772.
- Steins, Richard (2003). Colin Powell: A Biography. Greenwood Publishing Group. ISBN 0-313-32266-X. OCLC 51118331.

Political offices
Preceded by Peter Rodman	Deputy National Security Advisor; 1986–1987	Succeeded by John Negroponte
Preceded by Frank Carlucci	National Security Advisor; 1987–1989	Succeeded by Brent Scowcroft
Preceded by Madeleine Albright	United States Secretary of State; 2001–2005	Succeeded by Condoleezza Rice
Military offices
Preceded by William Crowe	Chairman of the Joint Chiefs of Staff; 1989–1993	Succeeded by David Jeremiah; Acting
Awards and achievements
Preceded by Mikhail Gorbachev	Recipient of the Ronald Reagan Freedom Award; 1993	Succeeded by Yitzhak Rabin
Party political offices
Preceded by Susan Molinari	Keynote Speaker of the Republican National Convention; 2000; Served alongside: John McCain	Succeeded by Zell Miller
