= Ronald Reagan Freedom Award =

United States private award

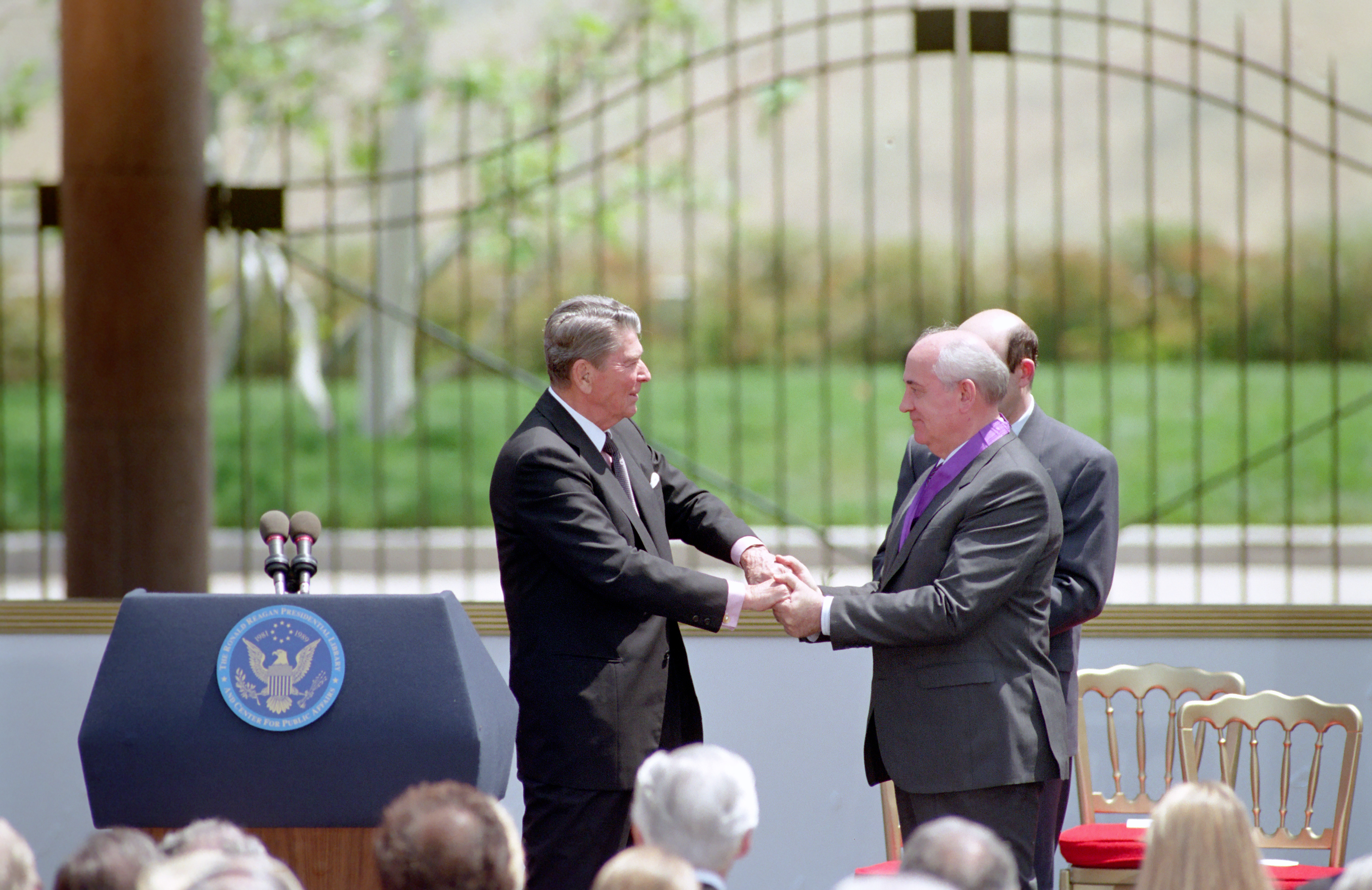
- Ronald Reagan awards Mikhail Gorbachev with the first Award at the Reagan Library
- Country: United States
- Established: 1992
- First award: 1992
- Website: https://www.reaganfoundation.org/programs-events/the-ronald-reagan-freedom-award/
- Ribbon of the award

The Ronald Reagan Freedom Award is the highest honor bestowed by the Ronald Reagan Presidential Foundation. The award is given to "those who have made monumental and lasting contributions to the cause of freedom worldwide."

Until her death, the award was given by former first lady Nancy Reagan on behalf of her husband, who died in June 2004. The award was first given in 1992, by former president Ronald Reagan himself. In 1994, Nancy Reagan presented the award instead as her husband had been diagnosed with Alzheimer's disease that year and was unable to attend the ceremony.

In order to receive the award, the potential recipient had to "have made monumental and lasting contributions to the cause of freedom worldwide", as well as "embody President Reagan's lifelong belief that one man or woman truly can make a difference".

== Recipients ==
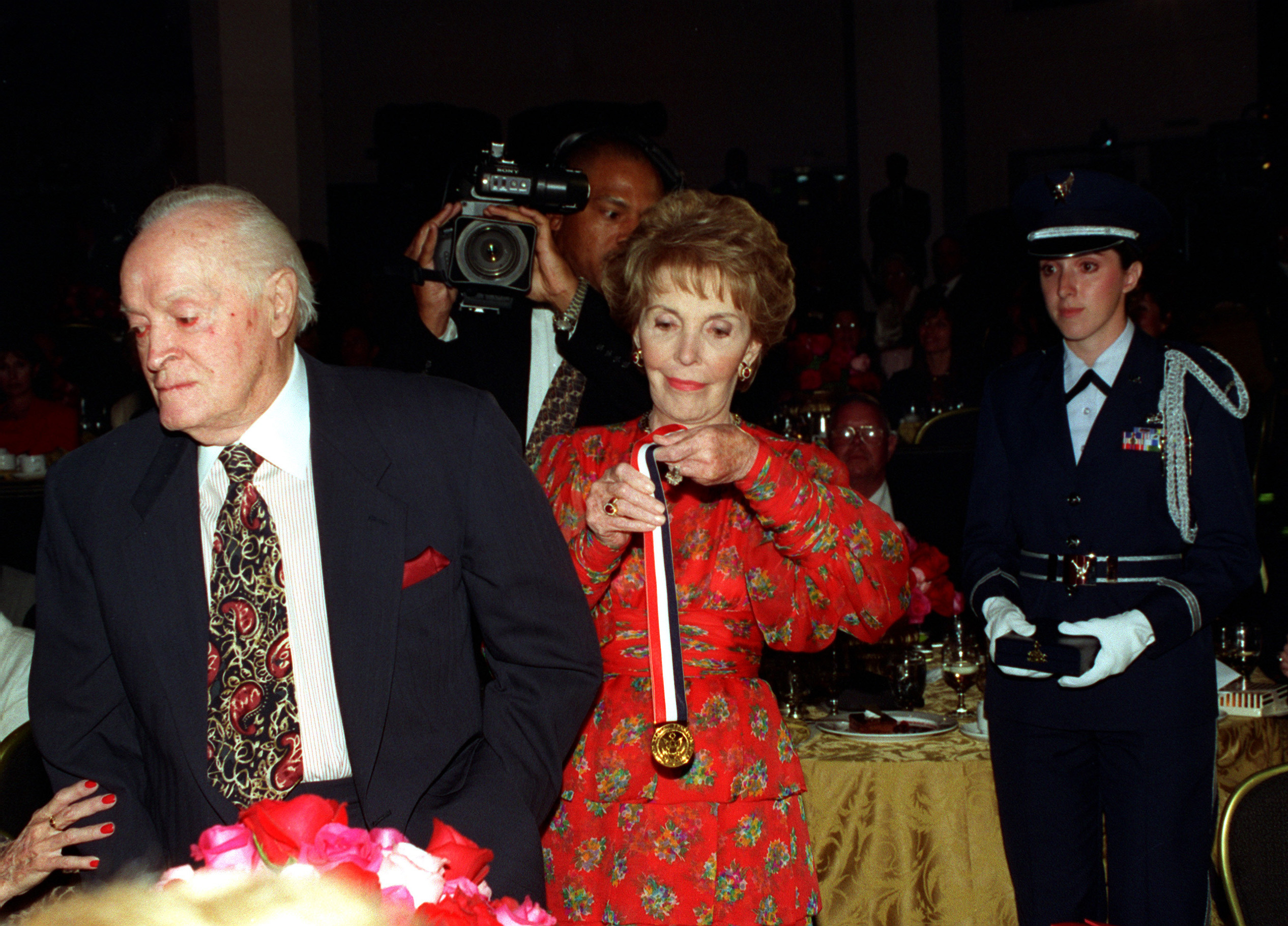
Nancy Reagan presents entertainer Bob Hope with the Award, 1997

- 1992 – Mikhail Gorbachev, former leader of the Soviet Union
- 1993 – General Colin Powell, former national security advisor to President Reagan
- 1994 – Yitzhak Rabin, prime Minister of Israel
- 1995 – Hussein of Jordan, king of Jordan
- 1997 – Bob Hope, entertainer
- 1998 – Margaret Thatcher, former prime minister of the United Kingdom
- 2000 – Billy Graham, evangelist
- 2007 – George H. W. Bush, former president of the United States and previously vice president of the United States under President Reagan
- 2008 – Natan Sharansky, Israeli politician, human rights activist, and former KGB prisoner
- 2011 – Lech Wałęsa, former president of Poland and Solidarity leader
- 2022 – Volodymyr Zelenskyy, president of Ukraine

== See also ==
- List of awards for contributions to society
