= Linda Powell =

American actress (born 1965)

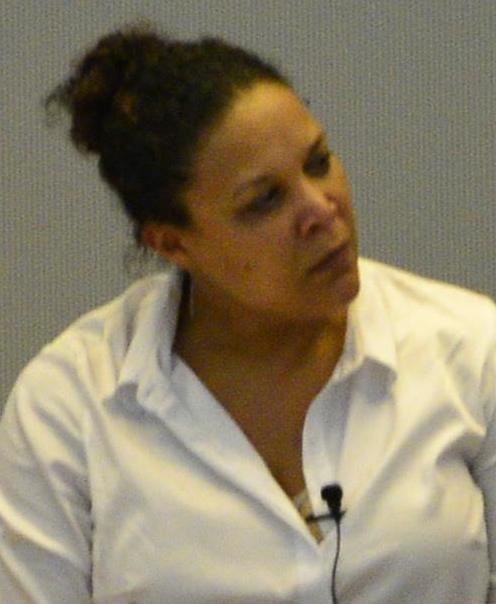
- Born: Linda Margaret Powell; April 16, 1965 (age 61); Fort Benning, Georgia, U.S.
- Education: College of William and Mary (BA); Circle in the Square Theatre School (GrDip)
- Years active: 1992–present
- Parents: Colin Powell (father); Alma Johnson (mother)
- Relatives: Michael Powell (brother)

Linda Margaret Powell (born April 16, 1965) is an American actress.

== Early life ==
Linda Margaret Powell was born in Fort Benning, Georgia, on April 16, 1965 the daughter of Alma and Colin Powell, the former United States Secretary of State, National Security Advisor and Chairman of the Joint Chiefs of Staff. She was raised on a series of military bases and attended four different high schools, because of her father's career. After attending Cheyenne Mountain High School in Colorado Springs, Colorado in eleventh grade, Powell graduated from Leavenworth High School in Leavenworth, Kansas in 1983. She graduated from the College of William and Mary in 1987 with a B.A. in English literature. Additionally, she studied theater at the Circle in the Square Theatre School.

== Career ==
Powell has had a long career of supporting roles in film and television, her most notable roles being Ingrid Mills on Chicago Fire, Pauline Samson in TV mini-series Political Animals and a lawyer in the film Blue Caprice.

Powell has also worked extensively in the theater, starring on Broadway in revivals of Wilder, Wilder, Wilder and On Golden Pond, and off Broadway in productions of A Raisin in the Sun, Angela’s Mixtape and The Christians.

== Selected filmography ==
=== Film ===
Year	Title	Role	Notes
1998	American Cuisine	Miller (US Navy officer)	
2007	American Gangster	Social Worker	
2010	Morning Glory	Louanne	
2013	Blue Caprice	Case Worker	
2015	Meadowland	Mrs. Williams	
2019	The Report	Marcy Morris	

=== Television ===
Year	TV	Role	Notes 1 episode
1999–2010	Law & Order: Special Victims Unit	Lauren White	9 episodes
2009	The Good Wife	Patrice Wilcox	Episode: "Conjugal"
2012	Political Animals	Pauline Samson	Miniseries
2012–2015	Chicago Fire	Ingrid Mills	7 episodes
2021	Modern Love	Mrs. Vacher	Episode: "Am I...? Maybe This Quiz Will Tell Me"

== Awards and nominations ==
Year	Award	Category	Work	Result	Ref
2016	AUDELCO Awards	Best Supporting Actress	The Christians	Nominated	
