= Michael Powell (lobbyist) =

American politician (born 1963)

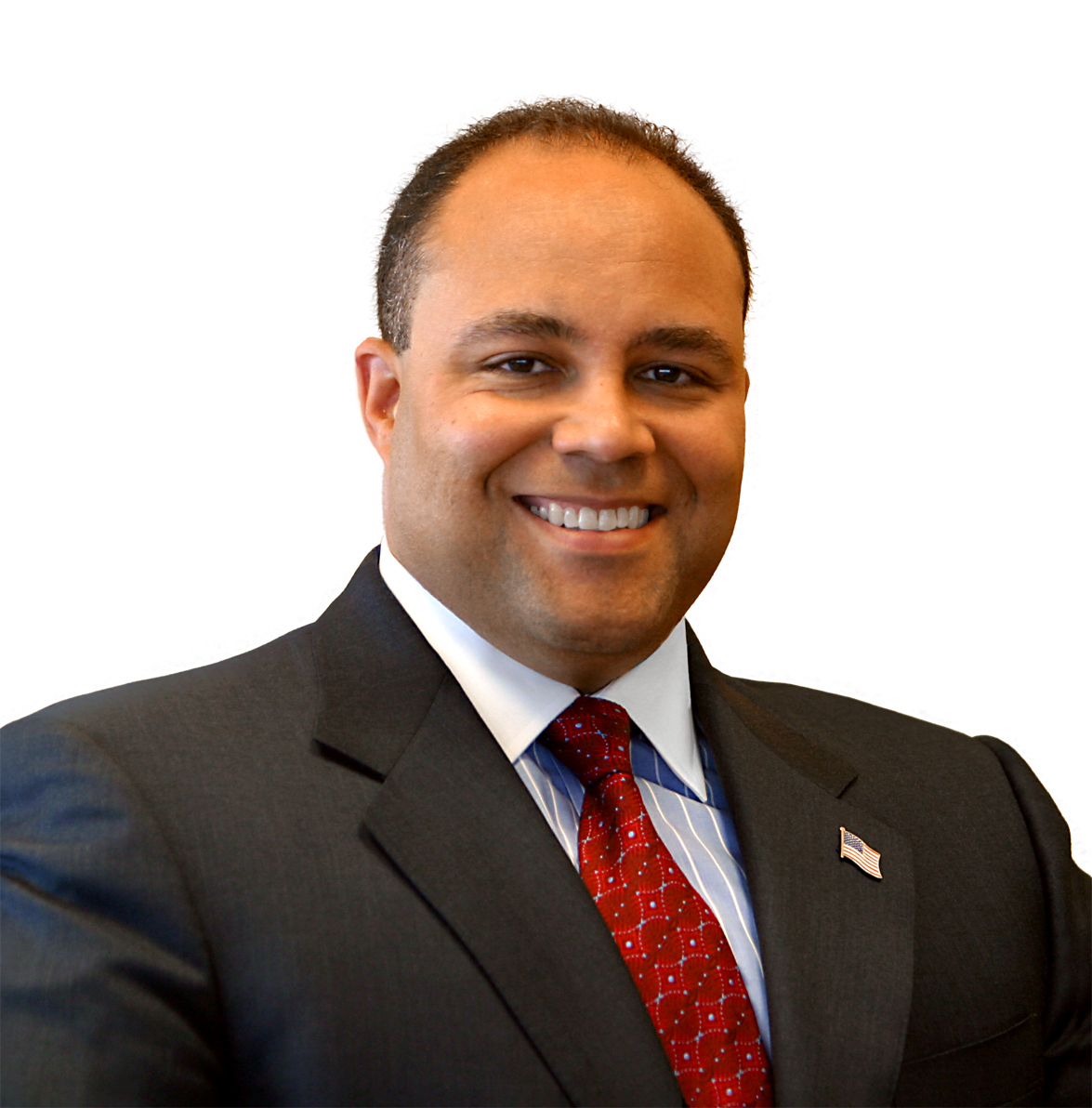

24th Chairman of the Federal Communications Commission
- In office January 22, 2001 – January 21, 2005
- President: George W. Bush
- Preceded by: William Kennard
- Succeeded by: Kevin Martin

Personal details
- Born: Michael Kevin Powell; March 23, 1963 (age 63) Birmingham, Alabama, U.S.
- Party: Republican
- Spouse: Jane Knott (m. 1988)
- Children: 2
- Parents: Colin Powell (father); Alma Johnson (mother)
- Relatives: Linda Powell (sister)
- Education: College of William & Mary (BA); Georgetown University (JD)
- Salary: $4,645,202.00 (2015)

Military service
- Allegiance: United States
- Branch/service: United States Army
- Years of service: 1985–1988
- Unit: 2nd Armored Cavalry Regiment

Michael Kevin Powell (born March 23, 1963) is an American attorney and lobbyist who served as the 24th chairman of the Federal Communications Commission from 2001 to 2005. Since leaving the FCC, Powell has worked as the president of the National Cable & Telecommunications Association (NCTA), a broadband industry trade association.

Powell was appointed to the FCC by President Bill Clinton on November 3, 1997, and was chosen by President George W. Bush to serve as chairman of the commission on January 22, 2001. Powell is the son of former secretary of state Colin Powell and his wife Alma Powell, and is described as a moderate republican.

== Early life and education ==
Michael Kevin Powell was born in Birmingham, Alabama, on March 23, 1963, the first child of Colin and Alma (née Johnson) Powell. Because of his father's military career, Michael grew up in various places in the U.S., including Dale City, Virginia; Fort Campbell, Kentucky; and Burke, Virginia, graduating from Lake Braddock High School in Burke in 1981. He graduated from the College of William & Mary, where he was initiated into Theta Delta Chi, on an ROTC Scholarship. Powell later received a Juris Doctor from the Georgetown University Law Center.

== Military, legal, government roles ==
Powell served as an armor officer in the United States Army. He spent the majority of his active service with the 3rd Squadron, 2nd Armored Cavalry Regiment in Amberg, Germany, serving as a cavalry platoon leader and troop executive officer. In 1987, as a junior army officer, Powell was seriously injured during a training mission in Germany. He and his unit were traveling in a convoy on the autobahn. Powell was riding in a jeep at the time. Due to heavy rain, the jeep crashed and Powell was ejected from the vehicle. After he hit the pavement, the jeep bounced and crashed down on Powell's midsection.

Half of Powell's pelvis had snapped off its rear anchor on the lower spine. In the front, it had ripped free of the cartilage connecting it to its other half. His bladder and urethra were torn and several vertebrae were cracked. After initial attention from German emergency room doctors, Powell was flown to a U.S. Army hospital in Nuremberg. After being stabilized, he was flown to Washington, D.C., and admitted to Walter Reed Army Medical Center where he spent a year in recovery. His spine remained fused at its base, forcing him to walk with a slight forward pitch the rest of his life.

After his rehabilitation he served as an expert advisor to the secretary of defense. He then clerked for a member of the U.S. Court of Appeals for the D.C. Circuit. He then worked for a year and a half as a private attorney in the Washington DC office of O’Melveny & Myers. From 1996, Powell served in the Clinton administration as chief of staff in the Department of Justice's Antitrust Division.

== Federal Communications Commission ==
As the chairman of the FCC, Powell led the charge to open up markets in VoIP, Wi-Fi, and Broadband over Powerline (BPL). His approach presumed that these new communications technologies would allow small companies to take on established corporations, and that regulations often stood in the way of progress. Powell's deregulatory policy coincided with a period of significant consolidation in the communications market. He advocated an updating of media ownership rules to reflect the entrance of new communications technologies such as the Internet. Such rules implemented legal restrictions preventing monopolies and oligopolies of ownership and viewpoint amongst media and news providers. Powell's moves were derided by critics as likely to increase already rampant media consolidation.

During his tenure as chair, he spoke at the University of California, San Diego, on January 26, 2004. In the talk, Powell spoke about the policymaking process in Washington, and about how ultra-wideband might impact telecommunications.

Powell opposed applying telephone-era regulations to new Internet technologies, a move critics charged would deny open access to communications facilities. He articulated a policy of network neutrality, and in March 2005 fined Madison River Communications for blocking voice-over-IP (VoIP) applications, the first-ever government action of that kind. Powell worked to give consumers the right to keep phone numbers when switching wireless carriers. He also championed the National Do Not Call Registry. While at the FCC, Powell was also the FCC's defense commissioner and oversaw all National Security Emergency Preparedness functions for the commission.

In a notable confrontation over the FCC's local telephone competition rules, Powell was outflanked by Republican Kevin Martin, who formed a majority with the FCC's two Democratic commissioners. Powell was later vindicated by a D.C. Circuit Court decision on March 2, 2004, that struck down Martin's order. Three months later, the U.S. Supreme Court let the D.C. Circuit decision stand. When Powell resigned, Martin (who worked for Bush's presidential campaign in Florida), was named the FCC's new chairman. Martin subsequently purged the FCC of many of Powell's staff.

Some of Powell's initiatives were challenged in federal court. Notably, the FCC's BrandX cable modem service decision, which declared cable modem should be free from telephone service regulations, was overturned in the Ninth Circuit case but was reinstated by the Supreme Court. The FCC's Broadcast Flag proceeding was overturned by the D.C. Circuit Court as an inappropriate exercise of FCC jurisdiction. The FCC's media ownership rules were likewise blocked by federal court and the television ownership cap set directly by the U.S. Congress.

=== Super Bowl XXXVIII controversy ===
A defining moment of his tenure as FCC chairman was the Super Bowl XXXVIII halftime show controversy, in which Janet Jackson's breast was exposed on live-broadcast television. This high-profile incident increased public attention toward the FCC's enforcement of indecency rules, which had already stepped up following Bono's use of an expletive on live TV. Powell himself later said that the controversy was overblown, although he recognized that it would cause concern when he saw it at a Super Bowl party.

In an interview with ESPN The Magazine, he stated, "I think we’ve been removed from this long enough for me to tell you that I had to put my best version of outrage on that I could put on. Part of it was surreal, right? Look, I think it was dumb to happen, and they knew the rules and were flirting with them, and my job is to enforce the rules, but, you know, really? This is what we’re gonna do?" In the aftermath, the FCC processed hundreds times more complaints than they had ever received.

=== Approach to indecency ===
Howard Stern and other controversial on-air personalities felt the sting of record fines, and both the U.S. House and Senate separately approved legislation significantly increasing the amount of money a station could be fined for indecency. Although the legislation was not ultimately enacted, the climate in Washington became so grey that several TV stations across the country declined to air Saving Private Ryan on Veterans Day for fear of FCC fines. Powell was interviewed on San Francisco talk radio station KGO (AM) when Stern called in to confront Powell. Stern questioned Powell's credentials, saying he got the job only because of his father and accused Powell of targeting him and fining him large amounts of money.

== Lobbying, net neutrality, and roles post-FCC ==
Powell resigned as chairman of the FCC on January 21, 2005. He said that he was glad to spend more time with his wife. In March 2006, Powell became a member of the board of trustees for the RAND Corporation. He served two terms as a member of the Board of Visitors at his alma mater, the College of William and Mary, from 2002 to 2009. On April 21, 2006, Powell was elected the Rector of the Board of Visitors, making him the first African-American to serve in that post in the college's 313-year history. He served as rector for two terms, stepping down on July 1, 2009.

On March 15, 2011, the National Cable & Telecommunications Association (NCTA) announced that Powell would take the helm from Kyle McSlarrow beginning April 25. Powell left his advisory role with Providence Equity Partners. In 2012, he spoke with FCC Chairman Julius Genachowski and gave the keynote speech during the industry's Cable Show. In April 2012, he contributed an opinion piece to Politico about the importance of cyber threats.

As a lobbyist representing the telecommunications companies, Powell published numerous editorials and opinion pieces around the country claiming to support net neutrality and opposing the FCC's enforcement of net neutrality through broadband reclassification as a Title II service.

== Political activity ==
Described as a "moderate Republican", Powell has been involved with Republican political campaigns. In the 1990s, Powell urged his father, Colin Powell, to run for president. During the 2008 presidential election, Powell advised and supported Republican nominee John McCain, while his father supported Democratic nominee Barack Obama.

In 2012, The Washington Post speculated that Powell was considering a candidacy for Mayor of the District of Columbia in the 2014 election, though he declined to enter the race.

In 2013, Powell was a signatory to an amicus curiae brief submitted to the Supreme Court in support of same-sex marriage as part of the Hollingsworth v. Perry case.

== Personal life ==
Powell married Jane Knott in 1988; they have two children.

Government offices
Preceded by William Kennard	Chairman of the Federal Communications Commission; 2001–2005	Succeeded by Kevin Martin
Academic offices
Preceded by Susan Aheron Magill	Rector of the College of William and Mary; 2006–2009	Succeeded by Henry Wolf
