= Alma Powell =

American audiologist (1937–2024)

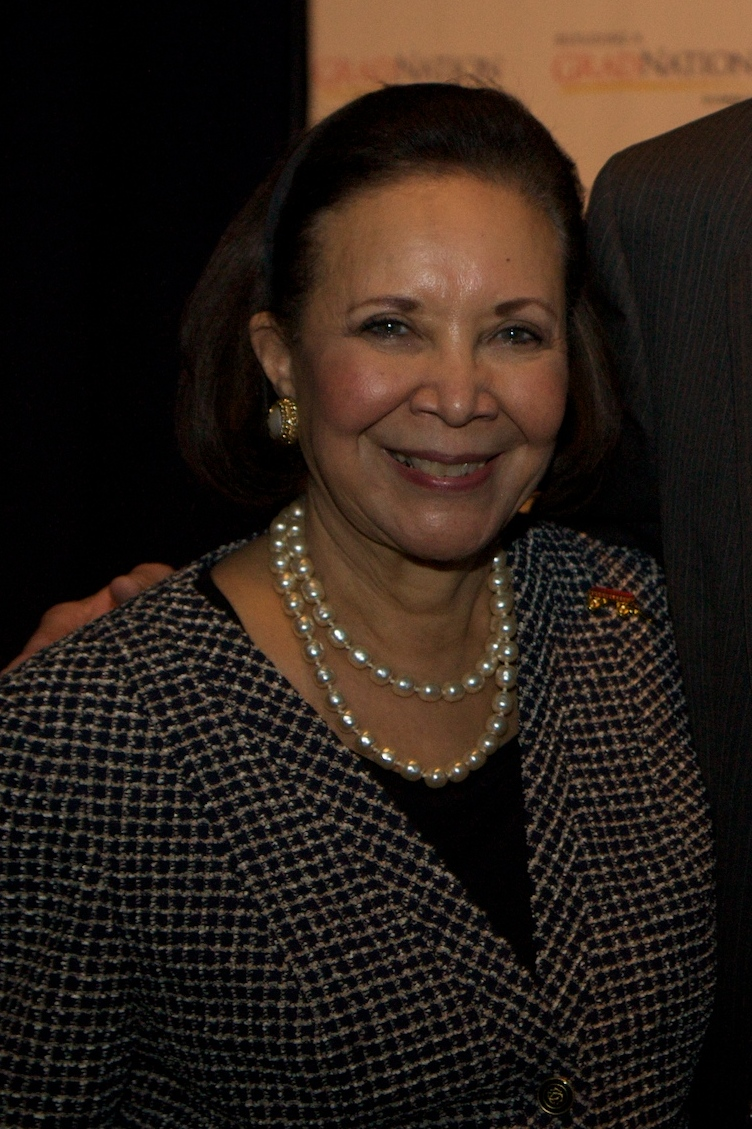
- Powell in 2012
- Born: Alma Vivian Johnson; October 27, 1937; Birmingham, Alabama, U.S.
- Died: July 28, 2024 (aged 86); Alexandria, Virginia, U.S.
- Education: Fisk University (BA); Emerson College (MS)
- Spouse: Colin Powell (m. 1962; died 2021)
- Children: 3, including Michael and Linda

Alma Vivian Powell (née Johnson; October 27, 1937 – July 28, 2024) was an American audiologist and the wife of military and political figure Colin Powell, to whom she was married from August 25, 1962 until his death in 2021.

== Biography ==
Born on October 27, 1937, in Birmingham, Alabama, Alma Powell graduated from Fisk University in Nashville, Tennessee, and went on to study speech pathology and audiology at Emerson College in Boston.

She was the mother of former chairman of the Federal Communications Commission, Michael Powell. She also had two daughters, Linda Powell, an actress, and Annemarie Powell. Her father and uncle were principals of two high schools in Birmingham; Condoleezza Rice's father worked in her uncle's school as a guidance counselor.

Powell was the chair of America's Promise, the nation's largest partnership dedicated to improving the lives of children and youth. She also authored two children's books, America's Promise and My Little Red Wagon. In 2011 she was named the NASBE's National Education Policy Leader of the Year along with her husband.

Powell died in Alexandria, Virginia, on July 28, 2024, at the age of 86.
