= Michael P. Fleming =

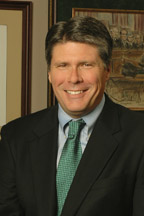
- Born: June 25, 1963; Orlando, Florida
- Died: July 1, 2020 (aged 57)
- Occupation: Attorney
- Website: flemingattorneys.com

Michael P. Fleming (born June 25, 1963 in Orlando, Florida; died July 1, 2020) was a Houston, Texas based attorney and elected official. Fleming was board certified in personal injury law by the Texas Board of Legal Specialization. Fleming was the managing partner of Fleming Law, P.C (formerly Michael P. Fleming & Associates, P.C.). Fleming was elected as county attorney in Harris County, Texas in 1996 and reelected the following term in 2000. Fleming was the lead attorney for Harris County before the Supreme Court of the United States in the case Christensen v. Harris County, a case that defined the limits of the Fair Labor and Standards Act and the authority of opinion letters issued by Department of Labor. Fleming came from a family with several generations of politicians. His grandfather was Harry Raymond Fleming and great-grandfather was George William Kyte. He and his widow Natalie, the elected judge of Harris County Criminal Court at Law Number 3, had six children.

== Career ==
In 1984, Fleming received his Bachelor of Arts from University of Saint Thomas in Houston, Texas and his Juris Doctor at University of Houston Law Center in 1987. Fleming is a member of the Houston and New York State Bar Associations, the State Bar of Texas, College of the State Bar of Texas and the Law Society of Ireland.

In 1996, and again in 2000, Fleming was elected as county attorney in Harris County, Texas. In March 2001 Fleming stepped down from his position as Harris County attorney to become partner in the law firm of Bracewell & Patterson. Fleming attributed his wife, judge and former prosecutor Natalie Fleming, and six children for his stepping down as Harris County attorney. In 2002 Fleming started his own firm, Michael P. Fleming & Associates, P.C.

Fleming has been selected to Super Lawyers for ten years, from 2007-2017 and is licensed as a solicitor by the Law Society of Ireland.

== Notable cases ==
=== Christensen v. Harris County, 529 US S 76, 120 S.ct. 1655, 146 L.ed.2d 621 (2000) ===
In an attempt to reduce overtime expenditures, Harris County, Texas adopted a policy which forced sheriffs to use accumulated compensatory time in lieu of working overtime. One hundred twenty-nine deputy sheriffs sued, claiming that the Fair Labor Standards Act (FLSA) does not permit an employer to compel an employee to use compensatory time in the absence of an agreement permitting the employer to do so.

The Supreme Court ruled 6-3 in favor of Harris County, holding that "[n]othing in the FLSA or its implementing regulations prohibits a public employer from compelling the use of compensatory time." Further, an opinion letter issued by the Department of Labor which prohibited employers from forcing employees to use compensatory time did not receive Chevron deference. The Department of Labor's opinion letter was not legally binding.

=== Brothers v. Klevenhagen, 28 F.3d 452 (5th Cir. 1994). ===
In 1988, two Harris County sheriff deputies shot Roland Brothers, a pretrial detainee, in an attempt to stop him from escaping custody. Brothers later died from his wounds. His family sued the Harris County Sheriff's Office, alleging that Brothers's civil rights were violated by the deputy sheriffs. Fleming represented the sheriff's office in his capacity as county attorney.

A district court granted a summary judgment in favor of the sheriff's deputies, ruling that their actions were constitutionally reasonable. On appeal, the United States Court for the Fifth Circuit upheld the lower court decision. The Fifth Circuit ruled that Brothers was not protected by the Fourth Amendment's protection against unreasonable seizures, because the Fourth Amendment does not protect detainees following their arrest.

== Affiliations ==
Fleming was an Associate of the American Board of Trial Advocates and a fellow of the Texas Bar Foundation. Fleming also participated on the board of directors of the University of St. Thomas for fifteen years, was a member of the Houston Sports Authority, and had a life membership as a founding director of the Irish Society of Houston.

Fleming was listed in Who's Who in the World, Who's Who in America and Who's Who in American Law.
