= United States v. Haggar Apparel Co. =

- Supreme Court of the United States

Argued January 11, 1999 Decided April 21, 1999
- Full case name: United States v. Haggar Apparel Company
- Citations: 526 U.S. 380 (more) 119 S. Ct. 1392; 143 L. Ed. 2d 480

Holding
- The statutes authorizing customs classification regulations are consistent with the usual rule that regulations of an administering agency warrant judicial deference applied under Chevron analysis.

Court membership
- Chief Justice William Rehnquist Associate Justices John P. Stevens · Sandra Day O'Connor; Antonin Scalia · Anthony Kennedy; David Souter · Clarence Thomas; Ruth Bader Ginsburg · Stephen Breyer

Case opinions
- Majority: Kennedy, joined by unanimous (parts I, II, III); Rehnquist, O'Connor, Scalia, Souter, Thomas, Breyer (part IV).
- Concur/dissent: Stevens, joined by Ginsburg

Laws applied
- 19 CFR § 10.16; 19 U.S.C. § 1202

United States v. Haggar Apparel Co., 526 U.S. 380 (1999), is a United States Supreme Court holding that Chevron deference is appropriate for regulations issued by Customs on behalf of the Treasury. The statutes authorizing customs classification regulations were found consistent with the usual rule that regulations of an administering agency warrant judicial deference; and nothing in the regulation in question persuaded the Court that the Customs Service intended the regulation to have some lesser force and effect. The statutory scheme did not support the importer's argument that the regulation only applied to customs officers themselves as opposed to the adjudication of importers' refund suits in the Court of International Trade. The Customs Service (which is within the US Treasury Department) is charged with fixing duties applicable to imported goods under regulations prescribed by the Secretary of the Treasury.

== Facts ==
Haggar Apparel Co., the respondent, designs, manufactures, and markets apparel for men. The matter arose from a refund proceeding for duties imposed on men's trousers shipped by Haggar to the United States from an assembly plant it controlled in Mexico. The fabric had been cut in the United States and then shipped to Mexico, along with the thread, buttons, and zippers necessary to complete the garments. There the trousers were sewn and reshipped to the United States. If that had been the full extent of it, there would not have been a dispute, for if there were mere assembly without other steps, all agree the imported garments would have been eligible for the duty exemption Haggar claimed.

The Government claimed that the trousers were permapressed in Mexico. This process involved baking, which the Customs Service claimed was a process in addition to assembly, and as such denied Haggar a duty exemption. Haggar claimed the baking was simply part of the assembly process, or, in the words of the controlling statute, an "operation incidental to the assembly process." Haggar's claim was difficult because Customs had issued an administrative regulation that deemed all permapressing operations as an additional step in manufacture, not part of assembly. The regulation had been adopted in 1975 by the Commissioner of Customs upon approval by the Treasury Department, after notice-and-comment rulemaking.

== Procedural posture ==
After being denied the duty exemption, Haggar brought suit in the Court of International Trade ("CIT"), which declined to find the regulation controlling and ruled in favor of Haggar. On review, the Court of Appeals for the Federal Circuit declined to analyze the regulation with Chevron deference, and affirmed the CIT's ruling.

== Haggar's arguments ==
Haggar advanced two sets of arguments in contending that Chevron analysis should not apply to the regulation. First, Haggar claimed that the regulation was limited in application to customs officers themselves and was not intended to govern the adjudication of importers' refund suits in the CIT. Second, relying on the authority and jurisdiction of the CIT, Haggar argued that even if Treasury did intend the regulation to bear on the determination of refund suits, the CIT had the power to interpret the tariff statute without giving the usual deference to regulations issued by the administering agency.

== Decision ==
The Supreme Court found no support for the assertion that the statute only bound customs officers' classifications, and not the importer's themselves. Rather, the Secretary of the Treasury is directed to establish and promulgate rules and regulations for the classification and assessment of duties. Haggar tried to argue that this meant that the Secretary was only charged with ensuring that classifications were consistent among various points of entry, but the Court disagreed.

The Court also ruled that the CIT must, when appropriate, give regulations Chevron deference. The Court noted that as early as 1809, Chief Justice Marshall had written in United States v. Vowell that for customs cases "if the question had been doubtful, the court would have respected the uniform construction which it is understood has been given by the treasury department ... upon similar questions."

== See also ==
- Customs valuation
- Chevron v. Natural Resources Defense Council (1984)
- United States v. Mead Corp. (2001), holding that Chevron deference did not apply to a tariff classification ruling issued by the Customs Service.
