= American Hospital Association v. Becerra =

- Supreme Court of the United States

Argued November 30, 2021 Decided June 15, 2022
- Full case name: American Hospital Association, et al. v. Xavier Becerra, Secretary of Health and Human Services, et al.
- Docket no.: 20-1114
- Citations: 596 U.S. 724 (more) 142 S. Ct. 1896 (2022)
- Argument: Oral argument

Questions presented
- 1. Whether Chevron deference permits HHS to set reimbursement rates based on acquisition cost and vary such rates by hospital group if it has not collected adequate hospital acquisition cost survey data.; 2. Whether petitioners' suit challenging HHS's adjustments is precluded by 42 U.S.C. §1395l(t)(12).

Holding
- The Medicare Prescription Drug, Improvement, and Modernization Act of 2003 does not preclude judicial review of the reimbursement rates set by the Department of Health and Human Services for certain outpatient prescription drugs that hospitals provide to Medicare patients; in this case, because HHS did not conduct a survey of hospitals’ acquisition costs in 2018 and 2019, its decision to vary reimbursement rates only for 340B hospitals in those years was unlawful.

Court membership
- Chief Justice John Roberts Associate Justices Clarence Thomas · Stephen Breyer; Samuel Alito · Sonia Sotomayor; Elena Kagan · Neil Gorsuch; Brett Kavanaugh · Amy Coney Barrett

Case opinion
- Majority: Kavanaugh, joined by unanimous

Laws applied
- Medicare Prescription Drug, Improvement, and Modernization Act

American Hospital Association v. Becerra, 596 U.S. 724 (2022), was a United States Supreme Court case relating to administrative law. The case centered on a rule from the Department of Health and Human Services, which reduced reimbursement rates for certain hospitals. Several hospital associations and hospitals affected by the rule sued HHS, alleging that it exceeded its statutory authority. The court was tasked with deciding if the rule was a reasonable interpretation of the law, and if the statute blocked judicial review of the rule in the first place.

== Background ==
=== Factual background ===
The 340B Drug Pricing Program is a federal program that allows certain hospitals to purchase outpatient drugs at discounted prices. 340B hospitals typically serve low-income or rural communities. The program allows the hospitals to reallocate scarce resources to provide more comprehensive services.

The Medicare statute provides two options to the Department of Health and Human Services (HHS) for determining the reimbursement rates for covered outpatient prescription drugs The rate may be equal:

(I) to the average acquisition cost for the drug for that year (which, at the option of the Secretary, may vary by hospital group (as defined by the Secretary based on volume of covered OPD services or other relevant characteristics)), as determined by the Secretary taking into account the hospital acquisition cost survey data under subparagraph (D); or

(II) if hospital acquisition cost data are not available, the average price for the drug in the year established under section 1395u(o) of this title, section 1395w–3a of this title, or section 1395w–3b of this title, as the case may be, as calculated and adjusted by the Secretary as necessary for purposes of this paragraph.

— 42 U.S.C. § 1395l(t)(14)(A)(iii)

Prior to 2018, HHS relied on the second option, and consistently set reimbursement rates for all hospitals at about 106 percent of each covered drug's average sales price. In 2018, HHS proposed a new rule that would reduce reimbursement rates for only 340B hospitals, but did not conduct a survey of hospital acquisition costs. In its final rule, HHS retained the approximately 106 percent reimbursement rate for non-340B hospitals, and established a 77.5 percent reimbursement rate for 340B hospitals. HHS set reimbursement rates for 2019 in the same way.

=== Lower court decisions ===
The American Hospital Association (AHA) brought suit challenging HHS's 2018 and 2019 340B reimbursement rates. In response, HHS contended, among other things, that various statutory provisions precluded judicial review of the reimbursement rates. The United States District Court for the District of Columbia initially found in favor of the (AHA), stating the judicial review was not precluded, and that the government exceeded its statutory authority. The United States Court of Appeals for the District of Columbia Circuit reversed, finding that the rule was a reasonable interpretation of the law, and applied deference under Chevron U.S.A., Inc. v. Natural Resources Defense Council, Inc.. On February 10, 2021, the AHA filed a petition for a writ of certiorari. On July 2, the Supreme Court granted certiorari.

== Supreme Court ==
The Supreme Court granted certiorari on July 2, 2021, adding a question presented of whether the courts had jurisdiction to consider the challenge to the rule. It heard oral arguments on November 30, 2021. On June 15, 2022, the Supreme Court reversed the D.C. Circuit in a 9–0 decision, written by Justice Brett Kavanaugh. The court ruled that the statute does not give the Department of Health and Human Services the authority or the discretion to vary the reimbursement rates for 340B hospitals.

Many legal experts considered the case to have significant consequences for the future of Chevron deference, and although the precedent was discussed extensively during oral arguments, the opinion did not mention it even once.

== See also ==
- Chevron U.S.A., Inc. v. Natural Resources Defense Council, Inc.
- Loper Bright Enterprises v. Raimondo
