= Mitchell v. United States =

Mitchell v. United States may refer to

- Mitchell v. United States (1875), 88 U.S. 350
- Mitchell v. United States (1878), 96 U.S. 162
- Mitchell v. United States (1925), 267 U.S. 341
- Mitchell v. United States (1941), 313 U.S. 80, concerning the racial integration of transport
- Mitchell v. United States (1962), 368 U.S. 439
- Mitchell v. United States (1999), 526 U.S. 314 concerning two Fifth Amendment privileges related to a criminal defendant's rights against self-incrimination

== See also ==
Several cases brought by Colin Mitchel concerning aboriginal title to lands in Florida transferred under Spanish rule may be referred to as Mitchel v. United States:

- Colin Mitchell v. The United States, 33 U.S. 307, 1834
- Mitchel v. United States, 34 U.S. 711 (1835)
- Colin Mitchel v. United States, 40 U.S. 52. 1841 (see Aboriginal title in the Taney Court#Spanish Florida and Louisiana)
