= Christensen v. Harris County =

- Supreme Court of the United States

Argued February 23, 2000 Decided May 1, 2000
- Full case name: Edward Christensen, et al. v. Harris County, et al.
- Citations: 529 U.S. 576 (more) 120 S. Ct. 1655; 146 L. Ed. 2d 621

Case history
- Prior: 158 F.3d 241 (5th Cir. 1998) (affirmed)

Holding
- An opinion letter from the Department of Labor, stating that an employer had to get the employee to agree before the employee had to schedule time off, did not receive Chevron deference and instead should receive the less deferential standard of Skidmore v. Swift.

Court membership
- Chief Justice William Rehnquist Associate Justices John P. Stevens · Sandra Day O'Connor; Antonin Scalia · Anthony Kennedy; David Souter · Clarence Thomas; Ruth Bader Ginsburg · Stephen Breyer

Case opinions
- Majority: Thomas, joined by Rehnquist, O'Connor, Kennedy, Souter; Scalia (except for Part III)
- Concurrence: Souter
- Concurrence: Scalia (except for Part III)
- Dissent: Stevens, joined by Ginsburg, Breyer
- Dissent: Breyer, joined by Ginsburg

Laws applied
- Fair Labor Standards Act, 29 U.S.C.S. § 201 et seq.

Christensen v. Harris County, 529 U.S. 576 (2000), is a Supreme Court of the United States case holding that a county's policy of requiring employees to schedule time off to avoid accruing time off was not prohibited by the Fair Labor Standards Act.

== Background ==
The Supreme Court addressed in the case whether the Fair Labor Standards Act of 1938 (FLSA), 29 U.S.C. § 201 et seq., forbids a public employer from requiring its employees to use their accumulated compensatory time, absent a pre-existing agreement authorizing compelled use. Compensatory time provides employees time off work with full pay and is granted to employees in lieu of a cash payment for overtime work. The FLSA provides a statutory cap specifying the maximum number of compensatory hours that an employee may accrue prior to an employer's obligation to provide an employee with a cash payment for overtime hours worked. See § 207(o)(3)(A).

In particular, Title 29 U.S.C. § 207(o)(5) provides:

An employee ... (A) who has accrued compensatory time off ..., and (B) who has requested the use of such compensatory time, shall be permitted by the employee's employer to use such time within a reasonable period after making the request if the use of the compensatory time does not unduly disrupt the operations of the public agency.

Here, the Sheriff's Department of Harris County, Texas, fearing a budget crisis due to the number of hours of compensatory time accrued by its deputy sheriffs, adopted a policy that required its employees to use their accrued compensatory time in order for the county to avoid being required to provide employees with a cash payment for overtime hours worked as pursuant to the statutory cap provision.

Harris County wrote to the Wage and Hour Division of the United States Department of Labor for advice on the merits of their policy as a legal matter in regard to the FLSA. In response, the Acting Administrator of the Division sent an opinion letter to the Harris County stating that the county's policy violated the FLSA. Consequently, petitioners, Edward Christensen and 128 other deputy sheriffs of Harris County, sued the county, claiming that the FLSA prohibited the implementation of the county's policy.

The District Court agreed with the petitioners and ruled in their favor by granting summary judgement and entered a declaratory judgement that the county's policy violated the FLSA. However, the U.S. Court of Appeals for the Fifth Circuit reversed the District Court's decision, explaining that the FLSA did not address the particular issue raised in the county's policy regarding the compelled use of compensatory time and, as a result, held that the FLSA does not prohibit Harris County from implementing such a policy.

The petitioners appealed. The U.S. Supreme Court granted certiorari in Christensen because there was division on the issue among the U.S. Court of Appeals for the Eighth and Ninth Circuits. The Court decided Christensen on May 1, 2000. Just a few weeks later, on May 30, 2000, the Court granted certiorari in United States v. Mead Corp., 533 U.S. 218 (2001).

== Decision ==
The Court held that an opinion letter from the Department of Labor, stating that an employer had to get the employee to agree first before it required the employee to schedule time off, did not receive Chevron deference and instead should receive the less deferential standard of Skidmore v. Swift & Co. The majority attempted to draw a bright line between formal agency documents (such as legislative rules) and less formal ones (such as opinion letters). Therefore, the opinion letter of the Department of Labor was not binding on the court. The court went on to state that there is nothing in the FLSA that prohibited the forced use of compensation time. Justice Thomas delivered the 6–3 decision of the court in favor of Harris County.

In regards to the substantive issue, the Court holds: Section 207(o)(5) of the FLSA does not prohibit employers from requiring employees to utilize their accrued compensatory time.

In Section II of the opinion, J. Thomas addresses the Petitioners' statutory interpretation argument, that employers are statutorily prohibited under 207(o)(5) from requiring employees to utilize accrued compensatory time. While acknowledging that "nothing in the FLSA expressly prohibits a State or subdivision thereof from compelling employees to utilize accrued compensatory time," both the Petitioners, and the United States as amicus curiae, argued that the FLSA implicitly prohibits such practice. J Thomas states that Petitioner's argument of implicit prohibition relies on the canon of expressio unius est exclusio alterius. J. Thomas further states that under such canon, the Petitioners contend that the "express grant of control to employees to use compensatory time...implies that all other methods of spending compensatory time are precluded."

J. Thomas rejects the Petitioners' argument. Implying that the Court accepts the expressio unius canon of interpretation, J. Thomas cites to Raleigh & Gaston R. CO. v. Reid, decided in 1872, and states that the Court accepts the proposition that "[w]hen a statute limits a thing to be done in a particular mode, it includes a negative of any other mode." J. Thomas, pulling dicta from Reid, defines the "thing to be done" not as the "expenditure of compensatory time," but rather as "a minimal guarantee that an employee will be able to make some use of compensatory time when he requests to use it."

J. Thomas concludes that the proper implied prohibition is: in the absence of an agreement, an employer may not deny an employee's request for a reason other than "undue disruption." Accordingly, the statute does not prohibit an employee from requiring employees to utilize accrued compensatory time.

J. Thomas supports this interpretation by discussing a number of statutory interpretation principles; first, the statutory schema supports the conclusion that the relevant statute is "better read" as a "safeguard" rather than an "exclusive method"; second, protections given in nearby provisions support such a reading; third, Petitioner's interpretation would effectively nullify amendments made to FLSA by Congress; fourth, the relevant statute is silent on the issue.

Lastly, J. Thomas argues that the FLSA in fact grants employers affirmative authority to regulate an employee's compensatory time: "First, employers remain free under the FLSA to decrease the number of hours that employees work. Second, the FLSA permits the employer to cash out accumulated compensatory time by paying the employee his regular hourly wage for each hour accrued."

=== Concurring opinions ===
Justice Scalia joined the judgment of the Court and all of its opinion except Part III. Justice Scalia deviated from the majority because the Court determined that the position of the Department of Labor warranted "Skidmore" deference rather than "Chevron" deference. The Court explained an opinion letter does not carry the same effect as a formal adjudication or notice-and-comment rule which would receive "Chevron" deference. Justice Scalia disagreed. He coined Skidmore v. Swift & Co., 323 U.S. 134 (1944) as an anachronism which has been since vitiated by Chevron U.S.A. Inc., 467 U.S. 837 (1984). Justice Scalia believed that Chevron deference was the only standard which could be applied. Footnote five illustrates this position:

deference can be inapplicable for only three reasons: (1) the statute is unambiguous, so there is no room for administrative interpretation; (2) no interpretation has been made by personnel of the agency responsible for administering the statute; or (3) the interpretation made by such personnel was not authoritative, in the sense that it does not represent the official position of the expert agency. All of these reasons preclude Skidmore deference as well. . . . Chevron establishes a presumption that ambiguities are to be resolved (within the bounds of reasonable interpretation) by the administering agency.

Christensen, 529 U.S. at n.5. (emphasis added). Therefore, argued that not only was no longer the standard but even if it was still applicable there could was not a circumstance that would warrant its application. Justice Scalia agreed with the Court that the Dept. of Labor's opinion letter was insufficient to trigger "Chevron" deference, however, there he believed there was other information available to warrant application of the standard:

But the Solicitor General of the United States, appearing as an amicus in this action, has filed a brief, cosigned by the Solicitor of Labor, which represents the position set forth in the opinion letter to be the position of the Secretary of Labor. That alone, even without existence of the opinion letter, would in my view entitle the position to Chevron deference.

As such, Justice Scalia believed that the position of the Department of Labor should be given Chevron deference. One year later 5 Justices in the subsequent term the Court adopted Justice Thomas' opinion in Part III of Christensen v. Harris County which had the effect of summarily dismissing Justice Scalia's concurrence.

Due to Justice Scalia's refusal to join Justice Thomas' opinion as it pertains to Part III, this part of the opinion does not represent the views of the Court but only the four justices who signed onto this part. Nonetheless, Part III is important to understand because it influenced the direction the Court took in future cases.

In Part III of the opinion, Justice Thomas' concluded that the Department of Labor's opinion letter is not entitled to a Chevron deference because opinion letters are similar to "policy statements, agency manuals, and enforcement guidelines, all of which lack the force of law" and, as such, are not entitled to a Chevron deference. Instead, Justice Thomas ruled that opinion letters are only "entitled to respect" under a Skidmore deference only if the opinion is persuasive. Applying this rationale, Justice Thomas held that the Department of Labor's opinion letter are not persuasive and, as such, do not warrant a Skidmore deference.

In reaching this conclusion, Justice Thomas argued that the opinion letter centered on the issue of compelled compensatory time, which is an issue that the regulation in question does not address. In particular, Justice Thomas pointed out that the regulation only provides that the "agreement between the employer or employee may include other provisions governing the preservation, use....of compensatory time." Focusing on "may", Justice Thomas concluded that since the regulation was written in a "permissive" tone and not a commanding term, the opinion letter's command that the employer must gain the employee's approval before mandating that employee's use their compensatory time is not persuasive and as such is not afforded a Skidmore deference.

== Dissent ==
Stevens J dissented:

In my judgment, the fact that no employer may lawfully make any use of "comp time" without a prior agreement with the affected employees is of critical importance in answering the question whether a particular method of using that form of noncash compensation may be imposed on those employees without their consent. Because their consent is a condition without which the employer cannot qualify for the exception from the general rule, it seems clear to me that their agreement must encompass the way in which the compensatory time may be used.

[...]

The Court concludes that expressio unius does not help petitioners because the "thing to be done" as prescribed by the statute (and because of which all other "things" are excluded) is simply a guarantee that employees will be allowed to make some use of compensatory time upon request, rather than an open-ended promise that employees will be able to choose (subject only to the "reasonable time" limitation) how to spend it. ...

This description of the debate misses the primary thrust of petitioners' position. They do not, as the Court implies, contend that employers generally must afford employees essentially unlimited use of accrued comp time under the statute; the point is rather that rules regarding both the availability and the use of comp time must be contained within an agreement. The "thing to be done" under the Act is for the parties to come to terms. It is because they have not done so with respect to the use of comp time here that the county may not unilaterally force its expenditure.

The case was argued on behalf of the United States by Matthew D. Roberts, for the petitioner by Michael T. Leibig and for Harris County, Texas by Michael P. Fleming.

== Sources ==
Christensen v. Harris Cty., 529 U.S. 576, 583 (2000); Fair Labor Standards Act of 1938, 29 U.S.C. §207(o)(5)
