= United States v. Mead Corp. =

- Supreme Court of the United States

Argued November 8, 2000 Decided June 18, 2001
- Full case name: United States v. Mead Corp.
- Citations: 533 U.S. 218 (more) 121 S. Ct. 2164; 150 L. Ed. 2d 292; 2001 U.S. LEXIS 4492

Holding
- A tariff classification is not entitled to judicial deference under the Chevron doctrine.

Court membership
- Chief Justice William Rehnquist Associate Justices John P. Stevens · Sandra Day O'Connor; Antonin Scalia · Anthony Kennedy; David Souter · Clarence Thomas; Ruth Bader Ginsburg · Stephen Breyer

Case opinions
- Majority: Souter, joined by Rehnquist, Stevens, O'Connor, Kennedy, Thomas, Ginsburg, Breyer
- Dissent: Scalia

Laws applied
- Customs Act
- Superseded by
- Loper Bright Enterprises v. Raimondo

United States v. Mead Corp., 533 U.S. 218 (2001), is a case decided by the United States Supreme Court that addressed the issue of when Chevron deference should be applied. In an 8–1 majority decision, the Court determined that Chevron deference applies when Congress delegated authority to the agency generally to make rules carrying the force of law.

== Background ==
The Mead Corporation challenged a ruling of the United States Customs Service that classified its day planners as "diaries, notebooks and address books, bound," which were subject to a tariff.

Before Mead, it was clear that the Chevron doctrine applied to interpretations adopted in legislative rules and certain formal adjudications, but lower courts differed on whether it also applied to interpretative rules, policy statements, informal adjudications, advisory letters, and amicus briefs. In 2001, the Supreme Court finally began to shed some light on the issue.

In Mead, the issue was whether the court should defer to the Customs Services' interpretation of the Customs Act, as manifested by the many classification decisions its regional offices made annually. The court granted certiorari to determine the limits of Chevron deference.

== Decision ==
Justice Souter wrote that "administrative implementation of a particular statutory provision qualifies for Chevron deference when it appears that Congress delegated authority to the agency generally to make rules carrying the force of law, and that the agency interpretation claiming deference was promulgated in the exercise of that authority."

Recognizing that thousands of tariff decisions are issued each year by the 46 regional offices of the U.S. Customs Service, and that each decision has no precedential value, the Court determined that the Chevron Doctrine should not apply.

However, the Court remanded the case for the Court of Appeals for the Federal Circuit to determine whether Customs' classification decision was entitled to deference according to its "power to persuade" under Skidmore v. Swift, 323 U.S. 134 (1944).

Justice Scalia was the sole dissenter in the case. Scalia believed that Chevron deference should be applied to all agency decisions that are "authoritative" and so took issue with the Court's reaffirmation of Skidmore, which Scalia called an "anachronism."

== See also ==
- Chevron v. Natural Resources Defense Council (1984)
- United States v. Haggar Apparel Co. (1999), holding that the Court of International Trade was required to apply Chevron deference to regulations promulgated by the Customs Service.
- List of United States Supreme Court cases, volume 533
- List of United States Supreme Court cases
