= Galveston County Bar Association =

The Galveston County Bar Association is a voluntary association of attorneys practicing in Galveston County, Texas. The organization was first founded in 1846. A new Galveston Bar Association was founded in 1868, the first permanent bar association in Texas. It served as a model for the State Bar of Texas.

The Galveston County Bar Association is dedicated to: (1) advancing the professionalism and legal skills of lawyers; (2) promoting the interests of the legal profession; (3) providing member services, and (4) promoting community service.

Officers of the Organization Rob Musemeche, President; Emilio Longoria, President-Elect; Hon. Jeff Brown, Past President; Leslie Burgoyne, Secretary; Megan Jones, Treasurer; Kurt Gonzalez, Director; Gus Knebel, Director; Kayla Allen, Director; Gabe Perez, Director.
