= Wilson v. Layne =

1999 United States Supreme Court case

- Supreme Court of the United States

Argued March 24, 1999 Decided May 24, 1999
- Full case name: Wilson et al. v. Layne, Deputy United States Marshal, et al.
- Docket no.: 98-83
- Citations: 526 U.S. 603 (more)
- Argument: Oral argument

Case history
- Prior: 141 F.3d 111 (4th Cir. 2004); cert. granted, 526 U.S. 603 (1999).

Holding
- Police officers who invite independent representatives of the media to a search of a private household do not serve a legitimate government interest and violate the Fourth Amendment, because publicity is not a legitimate government interest in the execution of a search warrant.

Court membership
- Chief Justice William Rehnquist Associate Justices John P. Stevens · Sandra Day O'Connor; Antonin Scalia · Anthony Kennedy; David Souter · Clarence Thomas; Ruth Bader Ginsburg · Stephen Breyer

Case opinions
- Majority: Rehnquist, joined by O'Connor, Scalia, Kennedy, Souter, Thomas, Ginsburg, Breyer
- Concur/dissent: Stevens

Laws applied
- U.S. Const. amend. IV

Wilson v. Layne, 526 U.S. 603 (1999) was a decision by the Supreme Court of the United States that unanimously held the entrance of a third-party not directly involved in aiding a search warrant into a private household unconstitutional. Sparked by a case where law enforcement officers were accompanied by the press during the execution of a warrant, the Court ruled that bringing along independent representatives of the media during the search of a private household does not serve a legitimate government interest and violates the Fourth Amendment, as such a third party does not legitimately contribute to the objectives of a search warrant.

== Background ==
On April 19, 1992, after identifying a fugitive in violation of a probation for felony charges of robbery and assault, law enforcement arrived with a warrant from the Circuit Court for Montgomery County, Maryland. Followed by a photographer and journalist from the Washington Post that Deputy Marshals had invited under a ride-along policy, officers entered the household, and after learning that the suspect was absent, left the building.

The reporters took several photographs during the execution of the warrant but were not directly involved thereof, leading to a Fourth Amendment lawsuit. Following the denial of summary judgement by the District Court, the Fourth Circuit reversed said decision under qualified immunity because the Fourth Amendment right brought up by the petitioners was not clearly established, but did not rule on the constitutionality of the officers' actions.

Four different rulings from various federal Court of Appeals circuits, including the Wilson case, split on the issue of whether qualified immunity applied to media ride-alongs. After the two most recent of the four reached the Supreme Court, it granted certiorari, with oral arguments heard on March 24, 1999. Former Assistant Attorney General for the Civil Division Richard K. Willard argued the case for the petitioners, while Assistant Attorney General of Maryland Lawrence P. Fletcher-Hill represented the state respondents. One of the four rulings, Hanlon v. Berger, was granted certiorari and consolidated for oral arguments with Wilson. The two other related cases, Ayeni v. Mottola from the Second Circuit and Parker v. Boyer from the Eighth Circuit, were denied certiorari under qualified immunity in 1995 and 1997 respectively prior to the Court's ruling in the two latter cases.

== Opinion of the Court ==
On May 24, 1999, the Supreme Court ruled in favor of the petitioners, with Chief Justice William Rehnquist delivering the unanimous opinion regarding Part I and Part II (on the facts of the case and findings regarding the Fourth Amendment respectively) of the ruling, as well as the opinion of the Court for Part III (on the applicability of qualified immunity), which was dissented solely by Justice John Paul Stevens. The Court affirmed the Fourth Circuit's decision on qualified immunity while ruling the permitted accompaniment of law enforcement by a third party unrelated to the serving of a search warrant unconstitutional under the Fourth Amendment.

The Court cited Anderson v. Creighton when determining the applicability of qualified immunity, stating that "the right allegedly violated must be defined at the appropriate level of specificity before a court can determine if it was clearly established" and that it was reasonable for law enforcement to have thought bringing a third party for media coverage along with them was lawful. Justice Rehnquist also noted that no prior judicial opinions that ruled such an action unconstitutional had been published despite the apparent growing popularity in media ride-alongs.

With respect to the second aspect of the case, that is whether or not the Deputy's ride-along policy violated the Fourth Amendment, the Court found that the third-party reporters present did not engage in carrying out the purpose of the search warrant or aid law enforcement in such a duty. Additionally, the Court determined that the reporters did not serve a legitimate purpose with respect to the warrant, and rejected arguments from the respondents that suggested otherwise, stating that publicity is not a valid standalone justification to bring a representative of the media acting for private purposes. Thus, the Court unanimously ruled that the police's introduction of the press into the authorized entering of the Wilson household was an unconstitutional violation of their Fourth Amendment rights.

=== Dissent ===
The decision that law enforcement violated the homeowners' Fourth Amendment rights against unreasonable searches went unopposed in the Court. In his sole dissent to Part III of Chief Justice Rehnquist's ruling, Justice Stevens concluded that the petitioners' right to Fourth Amendment protection in this specific case was clearly established before the relevant incident.

== Subsequent developments ==
Decided the same day, the Court in Hanlon v. Berger, 526 U.S. 808 (1999) reached the same conclusion per curiam that although a violation of Fourth Amendment rights occurred, qualified immunity applied since the legal situation surrounding media ride-alongs was not clearly established at the time of said violation.
