= Skidmore v. Swift & Co. =

- Supreme Court of the United States

Argued October 13, 1944 Decided December 4, 1944
- Full case name: John Skidmore, et al. v. Swift & Company
- Citations: 323 U.S. 134 (more) 65 S. Ct. 161; 89 L. Ed. 124; 1944 U.S. LEXIS 1253

Case history
- Prior: Judgment for defendant, 53 F.Supp. 1020 (N.D. Texas 1942); affirmed, 136 F.2d 112 (5th Cir. 1943)

Holding
- Nothing in the Fair Labor Standards Act or Court holdings precludes waiting time from also being working time.

Court membership
- Chief Justice Harlan F. Stone Associate Justices Owen Roberts · Hugo Black; Stanley F. Reed · Felix Frankfurter; William O. Douglas · Frank Murphy; Robert H. Jackson · Wiley B. Rutledge

Case opinion
- Majority: Jackson, joined by unanimous

Laws applied
- Fair Labor Standards Act of 1938

Skidmore v. Swift & Co., 323 U.S. 134 (1944), is a United States Supreme Court decision holding that an administrative agency's interpretative rules deserve deference according to their persuasiveness. The court adopted a case-by-case test, the Skidmore deference, which considers the rulings, interpretations, and opinions of the administrator. The Supreme Court reversed and remanded the case for further proceedings.

== Background ==
Seven employees of the Swift & Company packing plant in Fort Worth, Texas, brought an action under the Fair Labor Standards Act of 1938 to recover overtime, liquidated damages, and attorneys' fees, totaling approximately $77,000 (equivalent to $1.41 million in 2025). The employees were required to stay on the packing plant's premises when they were not on the clock. In the action brought by the employees to recover overtime for the periods that they spent on call, the district court ruled that the time employees spent waiting to respond to alarms did not count as hours worked. The United States Court of Appeals for the Fifth Circuit affirmed the lower court's decision. The employees appealed to the Supreme Court.

== Issue ==
What deference was due to the interpretative rules of an administrative agency?

== Decision ==
The Court decided that no principle of law either in the Act or in Court decisions precludes waiting time from also being working time. Moreover, the Court did not attempt to lay down a legal formula to resolve similar cases, based on their facts. Whether waiting time falls within or without the Act is a question of fact, to be resolved by the trial courts. Congress created the office of the administrator, providing him with responsibilities and empowering him to implement them subject to the act. In pursuit of his duties, the administrator has gathered considerable experience in the problems of ascertaining working time in employment involving periods of inactivity and knowledge of how to resolve disputes over working time. The administrator has set forth views of the application of the Act under different circumstances. Such views, under Wage and Hour Division Interpretative Bulletin No. 13., provide a guide on how to settle such disputes. As the Court stated in resolving the dispute:

The Administrator thinks the problems presented by inactive duty require a flexible solution... and his Bulletin endeavors to suggest standards and examples to guide in particular situations…. [In general, the calculation of working time] depends 'upon the degree to which the employee is free to engage in personal activities during periods of idleness when he is subject to call and the number of consecutive hours that the employee is subject to call without being required to perform active work.'

...the conclusion of the Administrator is that the general tests which he has suggested point to the exclusion of sleeping and eating time of these employees from the work-week and the inclusion of all other on-call time: although the employees were required to remain on the premises during the entire time, the evidence shows that they were very rarely interrupted in their normal sleeping and eating time, and these are pursuits of a purely private nature which would presumably occupy the employees' time whether they were on duty or not and which apparently could be pursued adequately and comfortably in the required circumstances; the rest of the time is different because there is nothing in the record to suggest that, even though pleasurably spent, it was spent in the ways the men would have chosen had they been free to do so.

The court stated that no statutory provision stated to what deference courts should pay to the administrator's guidance. However, the court stated that "we consider that the rulings, interpretations and opinions of the Administrator under this Act, while not controlling upon the courts by reason of their authority, do constitute a body of experience and informed judgment to which courts and litigants may properly resort for guidance."

The court developed a test to determine the deference to be given to an administrative agency's rules based on the following:

- The thoroughness of the agency's investigation
- The validity of its reasoning
- The consistency of its interpretation over time
- Other persuasive powers of the agency

== Subsequent developments ==
Chevron U.S.A., Inc. v. Natural Resources Defense Council, Inc., 467 U.S. 837 (1984), was a landmark case in which the Supreme Court set forth the legal test for determining whether courts should grant deference to a government agency's interpretation of a statute that it administers. Until it was overturned by Loper Bright Enterprises v. Raimondo, 603 U.S. 369 (2024), Chevron was the Court's clearest articulation of the doctrine of "administrative deference" to the point that the Court itself used the phrase "Chevron deference" in more recent cases. The Court, in an opinion by Justice John Paul Stevens, upheld the EPA's interpretation. A two-part analysis was born from the Chevron decision (called the "Chevron two-step test") in which a reviewing court first determined whether Congress has directly spoken to the precise question at issue. If the intent of Congress was clear, that was the end of the matter because the court and the agency must give effect to the unambiguously expressed intent of Congress. If, however, the court determined that Congress had not directly addressed the precise question at issue, and the statute was silent or ambiguous with respect to the specific issue, the court did not simply impose its own construction on the statute but determined whether the agency's answer was based on a permissible construction of the statute. Although Loper overturned Chevron, it did not overturn Skidmore and left the Skidmore deference as a means for agency interpretation to be respected in judicial overview.

Christensen v. Harris County, 529 U.S. 576 (2000), is a Supreme Court case holding that a county's policy of requiring employees to schedule time off to avoid accruing time off was not prohibited by the Fair Labor Standards Act. The Court held that an opinion letter from the Department of Labor, stating that an employer had to get the employee to agree first before it required the employee to schedule time off, did not receive Chevron deference but should receive the less deferential standard of Skidmore v. Swift & Co. The majority attempted to draw a bright line between formal agency documents (such as legislative rules) and less formal ones (such as opinion letters). Therefore, the opinion letter of the Department of Labor was not binding on the court. The court went on to state nothing in the FLSA that prohibited the forced use of compensation time. Justice Thomas delivered the 6–3 decision of the court in favor of Harris County and ruled that an agency's interpretation of a statute, announced in more informal agency papers (such as an opinion letter) is entitled to Skidmore deference, not Chevron deference.

The continuing vitality of Skidmore deference was questioned by Justice Scalia but is still used when agency actions do not carry the force of law. Justice Scalia, in his concurrence in Christensen v. Harris County, argued that Skidmore has no place since Chevron. However, the majority in Christensen held that an agency's interpretation of a statute, announced in more informal agency papers (such as an opinion letter), is entitled to Skidmore deference, not Chevron deference. United States v. Mead Corp., 533 U.S. 218 (2001), explicitly reaffirms Skidmore and reiterates deference to agency interpretations that do not have statutory authority resulting from a rulemaking process are based on "the agency's care, its consistency, formality, and relative expertness, and to the persuasiveness of the agency's position."

== See also ==
- Swift and Company v. United States (1909)
