= Bank of America National Trust & Savings Ass'n v. 203 North LaSalle Street Partnership =

Bank of America Nat. Trust and Sav. Ass'n v. 203 North LaSalle Street P'ship
- Supreme Court of the United States

Argued November 2, 1998 Decided May 3, 1999
- Full case name: Bank of America National Trust and Savings Association v. 203 North LaSalle Street Partnership
- Citations: 526 U.S. 434 (more) 119 S. Ct. 1411; 143 L. Ed. 2d 607

Case history
- Prior: In re 203 N. LaSalle St. Partnership, 126 F.3d 955 (7th Cir. 1997); cert. granted, 523 U.S. 1106 (1998).

Holding
- A debtor's prebankruptcy equity holders may not, over the objection of a senior class of impaired creditors, contribute new capital and receive ownership interests in the reorganized entity, when that opportunity is given exclusively to the old equity holders under a plan adopted without consideration of alternatives.

Court membership
- Chief Justice William Rehnquist Associate Justices John P. Stevens · Sandra Day O'Connor; Antonin Scalia · Anthony Kennedy; David Souter · Clarence Thomas; Ruth Bader Ginsburg · Stephen Breyer

Case opinions
- Majority: Souter, joined by Rehnquist, O'Connor, Kennedy, Ginsburg, Breyer
- Concurrence: Thomas, joined by Scalia
- Dissent: Stevens

Bank of America National Trust and Savings Association v. 203 North LaSalle Street Partnership, 526 U.S. 434 (1999), was a decision by the United States Supreme Court.

== Background ==
A $93 million loan was issued by Bank of America National Trust and Savings to 203 North LaSalle Street Partnership. The Partnership's Chicago office building was used as the principal asset in a mortgage set up to secure the loan. The Partnership filed for bankruptcy and bank began the foreclosure process on the piece of property.

== Opinion of the Supreme Court ==
Pre-bankruptcy equity holders may not, over the objection of a senior class of impaired creditors in a Chapter 11 plan, contribute new capital and receive ownership interests in a reorganized entity, when the opportunity is given only to the old equity holders under a plan adopted without consideration of alternatives. Rather, in order not to violate the absolute priority rule, a plan conferring an interest to old equity must extend an opportunity to others who may compete for the equity (e.g. at auction) or who may propose a competing reorganization plan.

Cram down is barred if a junior interest (old equity) holder under a proposed Chapter 11 plan receives or retains property "on account of" such junior interest. 11 U.S.C. 1129(b)(2)(B). The Court, considering whether the language of the statute implied a new value exception, found "on account of" not to mean "in exchange for" or "in satisfaction of" but rather should be interpreted to mean "because of." Therefore, the absolute priority rule is triggered by a causal relationship between holding the prior claim or interest and receiving or retaining property. The Court neither decided whether the statute included a new value exception, nor decided whether the exception exists at all.

== See also ==
- List of United States Supreme Court cases, volume 526
- List of United States Supreme Court cases
- Lists of United States Supreme Court cases by volume
