= Harry Raymond Fleming =

Canadian politician

Harry Raymond Fleming (October 24, 1894 – November 5, 1942) was a Saskatchewan physician and politician. He is the son-in-law of Liberal MP George William Kyte of Cape Breton. His grandparents, William Fleming and Mary Keating emigrated from Mahoonagh, County Limerick, Ireland to Ontario in 1851. He was born and raised on Amherst Island, Ontario and was educated at Queen's University in Kingston, Ontario where he also developed business interests. After receiving his medical degree, he entered the teaching profession. He moved to Saskatchewan in 1912 and was principal of the school in Humboldt, Saskatchewan from 1917 to 1918. After 1921, he gave up his educational work to concentrate on his medical practice.

Fleming entered politics and was elected to the House of Commons of Canada in the 1935 federal election as the Liberal MP for Humboldt. He was re-elected in the 1940 federal election and died in office in 1942.

== See also ==
- Michael P. Fleming
