= Arizona Department of Revenue v. Blaze Construction Co. =

- Supreme Court of the United States

Decided March 2, 1999
- Full case name: Arizona Department of Revenue v. Blaze Construction Co.
- Citations: 526 U.S. 32 (more)

Holding
- A state may tax the revenue of a government contractor received from work for the federal government.

Court membership
- Chief Justice William Rehnquist Associate Justices John P. Stevens · Sandra Day O'Connor; Antonin Scalia · Anthony Kennedy; David Souter · Clarence Thomas; Ruth Bader Ginsburg · Stephen Breyer

Case opinion
- Majority: Thomas, joined by unanimous

Arizona Department of Revenue v. Blaze Construction Co., 526 U.S. 32 (1999), was a United States Supreme Court case in which the court held that a state may tax the revenue of a government contractor received from work for the federal government. The states are not allowed to issue taxes where the legal incidence of the tax is on the federal government, but they can issue taxes where the economic burden of the tax falls on the federal government; i.e., the existence of the tax may indirectly increase the federal government's expenses.

== Background ==
Over several years, the Bureau of Indian Affairs contracted with Blaze Construction Company to build, repair, and improve roads on several Indian reservations located in Arizona. At the end of the contracting period, the Arizona Department of Revenue (Department) issued a tax deficiency assessment against Blaze for its failure to pay Arizona's transaction privilege tax on the proceeds from its contracts with the Bureau; that tax is levied on the gross receipts of companies doing business in the State. Blaze protested the assessment and prevailed in administrative proceedings, but the Arizona Tax Court granted the Department summary judgment. The Arizona Court of Appeals reversed, rejecting the Department's argument that United States v. New Mexico, 455 U.S. 720, controlled, and holding that federal law preempted the tax's application to Blaze.

== Opinion of the court ==
The Supreme Court issued an opinion on March 2, 1999. The court decided that it did not make a difference that the government contractor's work was on a reservation, so it announced a decision that applied to all government contractors.
