= List of United States Supreme Court cases, volume 526 =

This is a list of all the United States Supreme Court cases from volume 526 of the United States Reports:

Case name	Citation	Date decided
Holloway v. United States	526 U.S. 1	March 2, 1999
Peguero v. United States	526 U.S. 23	1999
Arizona Dept. of Revenue v. Blaze Constr. Co.	526 U.S. 32	1999
American Mfrs. Mut. Ins. Co. v. Sullivan	526 U.S. 40	1999
Cedar Rapids Community School Dist. v. Garret F.	526 U.S. 66	1999
Federal Employees v. Department of Interior	526 U.S. 86	1999
Federal Republic of Germany v. United States	526 U.S. 111	1999
Stewart v. LaGrand	526 U.S. 115	1999
Schwarz v. National Security Agency	526 U.S. 122	1999
Central State Univ. v. American Assn. of Univ. Professors, Central State Univ. Chapter	526 U.S. 124	1999
Rivera v. Florida Dept. of Corrections	526 U.S. 135	1999
Kumho Tire Co. v. Carmichael	526 U.S. 137	1999
South Central Bell Telephone Co. v. Alabama	526 U.S. 160	1999
Minnesota v. Mille Lacs Band of Chippewa Indians	526 U.S. 172	1999
Jones v. United States	526 U.S. 227	1999
Lowe v. Pogue	526 U.S. 273	1999
United States v. Rodriguez-Moreno	526 U.S. 275	1999
Conn v. Gabbert	526 U.S. 286	1999
Wyoming v. Houghton	526 U.S. 295	1999
Mitchell v. United States	526 U.S. 314	1999
Murphy Brothers, Inc. v. Michetti Pipe Stringing, Inc.	526 U.S. 344	1999
UNUM Life Ins. Co. of America v. Ward	526 U.S. 358	1999
United States v. Haggar Apparel Co.	526 U.S. 380	1999
United States v. Sun-Diamond Growers of Cal.	526 U.S. 398	1999
INS v. Aguirre-Aguirre	526 U.S. 415	1999
Bank of America Nat. Trust and Sav. Assn. v. 203 North LaSalle Street Partnership	526 U.S. 434	1999
El Paso Natural Gas Co. v. Neztsosie	526 U.S. 473	1999
Saenz v. Roe	526 U.S. 489	1999
Clinton v. Goldsmith	526 U.S. 529	1999
Hunt v. Cromartie	526 U.S. 541	1999
Florida v. White	526 U.S. 559	1999
Ruhrgas AG v. Marathon Oil Co.	526 U.S. 574	1999
New Jersey v. New York	526 U.S. 589	1999
Wilson v. Layne	526 U.S. 603	1999
Davis v. Monroe County Board of Education	526 U.S. 629	1999
Monterey v. Del Monte Dunes at Monterey, Ltd.	526 U.S. 687	1999
California Dental Assn. v. FTC	526 U.S. 756	1999
Cleveland v. Policy Management Systems Corp.	526 U.S. 795	1999
Hanlon v. Berger	526 U.S. 808	1999
Cross v. Pelican Bay State Prison	526 U.S. 811	1999
Richardson v. United States	526 U.S. 813	1999
O'Sullivan v. Boerckel	526 U.S. 838	1999
Amoco Production Co. v. Southern Ute Tribe	526 U.S. 865	1999
