= Florida v. White =

- Supreme Court of the United States

Argued March 23, 1999 Decided May 17, 1999
- Full case name: Florida v. Tyvessel Tyvorus White
- Citations: 526 U.S. 559 (more) 710 So. L. Ed. 2d 949

Holding
- The Fourth Amendment does not require the police to obtain a warrant before seizing a vehicle from a public place if there is probable cause that it is forfeitable contraband

Court membership
- Chief Justice William Rehnquist Associate Justices John P. Stevens · Sandra Day O'Connor; Antonin Scalia · Anthony Kennedy; David Souter · Clarence Thomas; Ruth Bader Ginsburg · Stephen Breyer

Case opinions
- Majority: Thomas, joined by Rehnquist, O'Connor, Scalia, Kennedy, Souter, Breyer
- Concurrence: Souter, joined by Breyer
- Dissent: Stevens, joined by Ginsburg

Laws applied
- U.S. Const. amend. IV

Florida v. White, 526 U.S. 559 (1999), was a U.S. Supreme Court case involving the exclusionary rule of evidence under the Fourth Amendment.

== Background ==
Florida law enforcement observed Tyvessel White use his car to deliver cocaine on three occasions between July and August 1993. Therefore, they found probable cause to subject his vehicle to forfeiture under the Florida Contraband Forfeiture Act. Two months later, White was arrested on unrelated charges, where officers seized his car without a warrant. A later inventory of the vehicle revealed two pieces of crack cocaine in the ashtray. During his trial for possessing controlled substances, White filed a motion to suppress the crack cocaine. Initially reserving their ruling, the trial court denied the motion after White was convicted by a jury. While the Florida First District Court of Appeal affirmed the conviction, the Florida Supreme Court ruled that probable cause alone does not justify a warrantless seizure.

== Opinion of the Court ==
In a 7–2 vote, the Court overturned the lower courts' decision and ruled that under Carroll v. United States and United States v. Watson, law enforcement exercises greater latitude in warrantless searches when in public places (as long as the officials possess probable cause).

=== Souter's Concurrence ===
Justice Souter concurred with the majority opinion; however, he advocated against the unregulated seizure of property whether it is viewed in public or not.

=== Stevens' Dissent ===
Justice Stevens objected to the fact that White was arrested on unrelated charges when law enforcement had the opportunity to arrest him for cocaine trafficking. Additionally, he became perplexed that a warrant was not issued during the two-month timespan. Stevens concludes that the circumstances leading up to White's arrest did not significantly threaten public safety in contrast to Watson.

== Significance ==
This case grants law enforcement greater ability to seize vehicles without a warrant in public areas insofar that there is probable cause around the need to do so.
