= Mitchell v. United States (1999) =

- Supreme Court of the United States

Argued December 9, 1998 Decided April 5, 1999
- Full case name: Amanda Mitchell v. United States of America
- Citations: 526 U.S. 314 (more) 119 S. Ct. 1307; 143 L. Ed. 2d 424; 1999 U.S. LEXIS 2348

Case history
- Prior: Sentence affirmed, United States v. Mitchell, 122 F.3d 185 (3d Cir. 1997); certiorari granted, Mitchell v. United States, 524 U.S. 925.
- Subsequent: Sentence vacated, remanded for resentencing, United States v. Mitchell, 187 F.3d 331 (3d Cir. 1999)

Holding
- A guilty plea does not waive the Fifth Amendment privilege against self-incrimination at sentencing, and the sentencing court may not draw adverse inferences in determining facts related to the circumstances of the crime and bearing upon the sentence when a defendant invokes it.

Court membership
- Chief Justice William Rehnquist Associate Justices John P. Stevens · Sandra Day O'Connor; Antonin Scalia · Anthony Kennedy; David Souter · Clarence Thomas; Ruth Bader Ginsburg · Stephen Breyer

Case opinions
- Majority: Kennedy, joined by Stevens, Souter, Ginsburg, Breyer
- Dissent: Scalia, joined by Rehnquist, O'Connor, Thomas
- Dissent: Thomas

Laws applied
- U.S. Const. amend. V; 18 U.S.C. § 846

Mitchell v. United States, 526 U.S. 314 (1999), is a United States Supreme Court case that considered two Fifth Amendment privileges related to a criminal defendant’s rights against self-incrimination in a Federal District Court. The court ruled (1) that a defendant who waives the privilege against self-incrimination by pleading guilty does not also waive the privilege at sentencing, and (2) that the court cannot draw an adverse inference from the defendant's silence when determining facts related to the crime which affect the severity of the sentence.

== Circumstances ==
Amanda Mitchell was indicted, along with co-defendants, for one count of conspiracy to distribute five or more kilograms of cocaine and pleaded guilty. However, Mitchell reserved the right to contest the drug quantity under the conspiracy count during her sentencing hearing. She was told before her plea was accepted, that she faced a mandatory minimum sentence of one year in prison for the conspiracy offense and a mandatory minimum of ten years in prison if the prosecution could prove the amount of cocaine involved was the required five kilograms necessary for the longer sentence. Mitchell was told that by making a guilty plea she was waiving her Fifth Amendment right to remain silent during the trial.

During the sentencing hearing, the District Court heard testimony from some of Mitchell's codefendants, that the amount of Mitchell's alleged drug sales put her over the five-kilogram threshold. Although Mitchell did not testify in defense of the government's changes regarding the quantity of the drug, her counsel argued that the quantity of cocaine attributable to her for sentencing purposes was less than the threshold. The District Court ruled that as a result of her guilty plea, Mitchell had forfeited the right to remain silent about the crime's details. The District Court accepted the testimony of her co-defendants' that put her over the five-kilogram threshold and that therefore the 10-year minimum sentence was mandated. It also noted that her failure to testify contributed to the court's decision to accept the co-defendants' testimony. The Court of Appeals affirmed this decision.

== Decision ==
The court held that a guilty plea is not also a waiver of the privilege at sentencing. It also held that the trial court may not draw adverse inference by the defendant's silence while facts bearing upon the severity of the sentence are considered. Any inference of the defendant's silence advocates that a court's ruling can be made on assumption. The court's decision supported that a ruling should be made based on facts. In addition, had the court allowed for an inference to be made from silence, suspicions would then inherently supersede and contradict the principle that defendants are innocent until proven guilty.

== See also ==
- List of United States Supreme Court cases, volume 526
- List of United States Supreme Court cases
- Lists of United States Supreme Court cases by volume
