= State Bar of Texas =

Bar Association

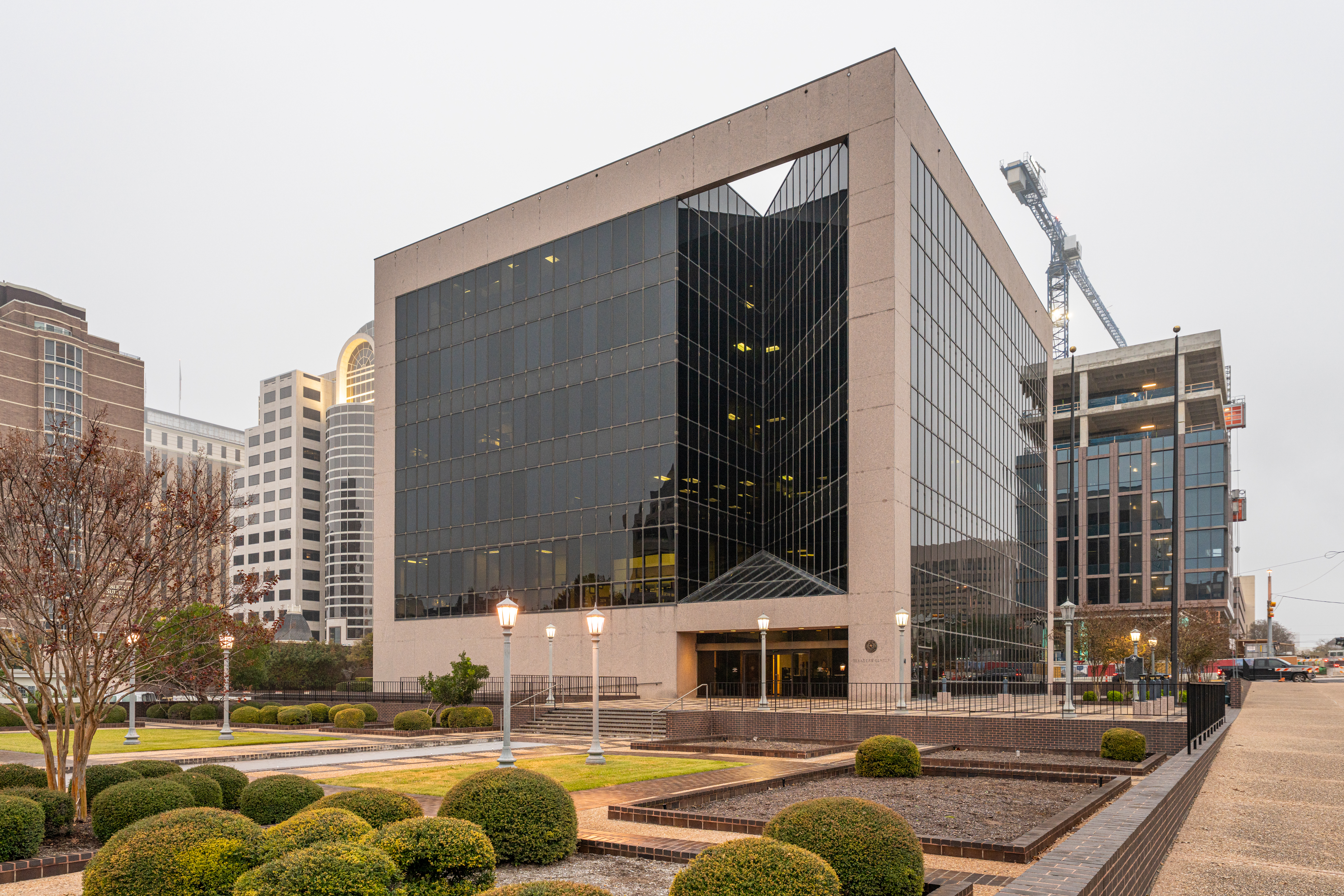
- Texas Law Center has the offices of the State Bar of Texas
- Type: Legal Society
- Headquarters: Austin, Texas
- Location: United States
- Members: 118,430
- Website: Official website

The State Bar of Texas (the Texas Bar) is an agency of the judiciary under the administrative control of the Texas Supreme Court. It is responsible for assisting the Texas Supreme Court in overseeing all attorneys licensed to practice law in Texas. With 118,430 active members, the State Bar of Texas is one of the largest state bars in the United States. Unlike the American Bar Association (ABA), the State Bar of Texas (SBOT) is a mandatory bar. The State Bar is headquartered in the Texas Law Center at 1414 Colorado Street in Austin.

== Membership ==
The State Bar of Texas is composed of those persons licensed to practice law in Texas and is an "integrated" or "mandatory" bar. The State Bar Act, adopted by the Legislature in 1939, mandates that all attorneys licensed to practice law in Texas be members of the State Bar. As of 2026, membership in the Texas Bar stood at 178,556.

== Governance ==
On a day-to-day basis, the State Bar is run by an executive director, currently E.A. "Trey" Apffel III. The operations of the Bar are overseen by an elected board of directors made up of volunteers. State Bar members also elect as the president, who serves a one-year term as president-elect before taking office. The current president of the State Bar of Texas (2026-2027) is G. David Smith, a founding partner in Smith & Lee Lawyers in Rockwall. In addition to electing their Bar leaders, Texas attorneys have voting rights on some policy matters through the instrument of referendum.

== Texas Disciplinary Rules of Professional Conduct ==
The Texas Disciplinary Rules of Professional Conduct are promulgated by the Texas Supreme Court. These rules "set forth principles to which attorneys should aspire and rules to which they must conform". Along with the court rules and Texas Code of Judicial Conduct, the most current version of the disciplinary rules is posted on the Texas Judiciary's website.

The attorney disciplinary rules are enforced by the Commission for Lawyer Discipline (CLD), which prosecutes attorney misconduct in district courts and/or through 17 district grievance committees throughout the state, consisting of appointed volunteers.

The Commission is composed of 12 members: six attorneys appointed by the president of the State Bar and six public members appointed by the Supreme Court of Texas. Prosecutions are handled by the Commission's Chief Disciplinary Counsel.

The most severe disciplinary penalty is disbarment. Lesser sanctions are time-limited suspensions, which may be probated or probated in part. Appeals may be taken to the Board of Disciplinary Appeals (BODA) and ultimately to the Texas Supreme Court. Sanctions decisions are published in the Texas Bar Journal. Conviction of a serious crime will entail mandatory discipline.

In Fiscal Year 2024-25 the Commission for Lawyer Discipline successfully resolved 329 complaints through the imposition of 286 sanctions and collected $244,308 in attorneys’ fees.

A Texas attorney's public disciplinary history (if any) and current license status can be looked up on the SBOT website through a search by name or license number (Texas Bar Number), which must appear on all court filings by an attorney.

== History ==
Although lawyers have had statewide organizations in Texas since the 19th century, the State Bar of Texas began its formal existence on April 19, 1939, when Governor W. Lee O'Daniel signed House Bill No. 74, titled the State Bar Act of 1939. From that point onward, membership in the State Bar of Texas was a prerequisite for the practice of law in Texas.

In July 1963, Gene Cavin was hired as the first full-time Continuing Legal Education (CLE) Director, greatly expanding the course material for professional development.

In 1976 the Texas Law Center, located at Fifteenth and Colorado Streets in Austin, TX, became the permanent headquarters for the Texas State Bar.

== Sections of the State Bar of Texas ==
Administrative & Public Law; African-American Lawyers; Alternative Dispute Resolution; Animal Law; Antitrust and Business Litigation; Appellate; Asian-Pacific Interest; Aviation and Space Law; Bankruptcy Law; Business Law; Child Protection Law; Collaborative Law; Computer & Technology; Constitutional Law; Construction Law; Consumer and Commercial Law; Corporate Counsel; Criminal Justice; Entertainment and Sports Law; Environmental and Natural Resources; Family Law; General Practice, Solo, and Small Firm; Government Law; Health Law; Hispanic Lawyers; Immigration and Nationality Law; Insurance Law; Intellectual Property Law; International Law; James C. Watson Inn; Judicial; Justice Court; Juvenile Law; Labor and Employment Law; Law Student Division; Legislative and Campaign Law; LGBTQ+ Law; Litigation; Military and Veterans Law; Municipal Judges; Native American Law; Oil, Gas, and Energy Resources Law; Paralegal Division; Poverty Law; Public Utility Law; Real Estate, Probate & Trust; School Law; Tax; Women and the Law; Workers' Compensation

== See also ==
- College of the State Bar of Texas
- Galveston County Bar Association
