= Loper Bright Enterprises v. Raimondo =

2024 landmark decision of the US Supreme Court

Loper Bright Enterprises v. Raimondo Relentless, Inc. v. Department of Commerce
- Supreme Court of the United States

Argued January 17, 2024 Decided June 28, 2024
- Full case name: Loper Bright Enterprises, et al. v. Gina Raimondo, Secretary of Commerce, et al. Relentless, Inc. et al. v. Department of Commerce, et al.
- Docket nos.: 22-451; 22-1219
- Citations: 603 U.S. 369 (more) 144 S. Ct. 2244
- Argument: Oral argument
- Opinion announcement: Opinion announcement
- Decision: Opinion

Case history
- Prior: Loper Bright Enterprises, Inc. v. Raimondo, 45 F.4th 359 (D.C. Cir. 2022). Loper Bright Enterprises, Inc. v. Ross, 544 F.Supp.3d 82 (D.D.C. 2021).
- Subsequent: Remanded to D.C. Circuit.

Questions presented
- Whether the Court should overrule Chevron or at least clarify that statutory silence concerning controversial powers expressly but narrowly granted elsewhere in the statute does not constitute an ambiguity requiring deference to the agency.

Holding
- The Administrative Procedure Act requires courts to exercise their independent judgment in deciding whether an agency has acted within its statutory authority, and courts may not defer to an agency interpretation of the law simply because a statute is ambiguous; Chevron is overruled.

Court membership
- Chief Justice John Roberts Associate Justices Clarence Thomas · Samuel Alito; Sonia Sotomayor · Elena Kagan; Neil Gorsuch · Brett Kavanaugh; Amy Coney Barrett · Ketanji Brown Jackson

Case opinions
- Majority: Roberts, joined by Thomas, Alito, Gorsuch, Kavanaugh, Barrett
- Concurrence: Thomas
- Concurrence: Gorsuch
- Dissent: Kagan, joined by Sotomayor; Jackson (as it applies to Relentless)
- Jackson (in Loper Bright) (Note: While Jackson recused herself in Loper Bright, she participated in Relentless and joined the dissent written by Kagan that was part of the combined slip opinion for both cases.) took no part in the consideration or decision of the case.

Laws applied
- Administrative Procedure Act
- This case overturned a previous ruling or rulings
- Chevron U.S.A., Inc. v. Natural Resources Defense Council, Inc. (1984)

Loper Bright Enterprises v. Raimondo, 603 U.S. 369 (2024), is a landmark decision of the Supreme Court of the United States in the field of administrative law, the law governing regulatory agencies. Together with its companion case, Relentless, Inc. v. Department of Commerce, it overruled the principle of Chevron deference established in Chevron U.S.A., Inc. v. Natural Resources Defense Council, Inc. (1984), which had directed courts to defer to an agency's reasonable interpretation of an ambiguity in a law that the agency enforces.

In lieu of Chevron, the decision assigns the determination of congressional ambiguity to the judicial branch, with executive agency expertise still to be considered under the weaker Skidmore deference. Existing rules and case law already decided under Chevron deference were to remain in place from this decision. Both cases originated from fishing companies challenging a rule established by the National Marine Fisheries Service (NMFS) for fishing companies to pay for the cost of federal monitors that may be assigned to their boats, under authorization of the Magnuson–Stevens Fishery Conservation and Management Act (Magnuson–Stevens Act (MSA)). The company claimed that the Act did not allow NMFS to pass the monitors' costs to the fishing companies, challenging Chevron deference that was applied in favor of the NMFS during lower court hearings.

== Background ==
In 1976, Congress passed the Magnuson–Stevens Fishery Conservation and Management Act, which was intended to provide for the management of marine fisheries in United States waters. One of the Act's provisions authorizes the National Marine Fisheries Service (a subsidiary agency of the United States Department of Commerce) to require fishing vessels to "carry" federal monitors on board to enforce the agency's regulations, particularly to prevent overfishing.

The New England Fisheries Management Council (NEFMC) is a council that regulates fisheries in federal waters under the Magnuson-Stevens Fishery Conservation and Management Act. NEFMC develops fishery management plans for fisheries off the coasts of Maine, New Hampshire, Massachusetts, Rhode Island, and Connecticut. One such fishery is the Atlantic herring fishery. Unlike in North Pacific and foreign fisheries, the Magnuson–Stevens Act (MSA) does not explicitly require Atlantic herring fisheries to pay the costs of federal monitors. In addition, budgets for NMFS had been falling in recent years. As a result, NMFS had been unable to pay for increased monitor coverage in the Atlantic herring fishery.

Starting in 2013, the NEFMC started to implement a workaround to this issue. It began to develop an amendment to the New England fishery management plans that would give the council the power – though not explicitly given in the MSA – to require the fishing industry to pay the costs of additional monitoring. The NEFMC submitted this amendment to the NMFS, which in February 2020 published its final rule establishing a standardized process that would require industry-funded monitoring across New England fisheries.

=== Prior precedent ===
The Supreme Court ruled in Chevron U.S.A., Inc. v. Natural Resources Defense Council, Inc., 467 U.S. 837 (1984), that courts must defer to the authority of an administrative agency's interpretation of a statute whenever both the intent of Congress was ambiguous and the agency's interpretation is reasonable or permissible. In its opinion, the Court outlined a two-step test on when to grant deference, known as Chevron deference. The Court reasoned that ambiguities in statute may be a delegation of authority from Congress, thus limiting a federal court's ability to review an agency's interpretation of the law. In the specific case at the heart of Chevron, the challenge arose from the United States Environmental Protection Agency's interpretation of what defined a source of production of pollution in its authority granted by Congress through the Clean Air Act.

In the first step of the test, the Court would ask whether there was an unambiguous expression of Congressional intent contained within the statute. If so, then the Court must yield to Congressional intent. If not, then the Court would proceed with the second step of the test. It would ask whether the agency's application of the statute was based on a "reasonable" interpretation of ambiguous wording. If so, then the Court would defer to the agency's interpretation of the statute. If not, then the agency's interpretation would likely be deemed impermissible. Here, reasonability was determined by the specific factual circumstances present in the case.

Since being handed down, Chevron had become among the most frequently cited cases in American administrative law. Over 17,000 lower federal court decisions and 70 decisions by the Supreme Court itself cited Chevron. Between 2003 and 2013, circuit courts applied Chevron in 77% of decisions regarding regulatory disputes.

In years prior to the current case, the Supreme Court, with a majority of conservative justices, had been seen as leading towards weakening or overturning Chevron. In West Virginia v. EPA, 597 U.S. 697 (2022), the Supreme Court ruled against parts of an emissions-related rule created by the United States Environmental Protection Agency, asserting that the agency did not consider the costs of implementation of their rule. While this case did not overturn Chevron, it defined the major questions doctrine that was used in future cases to question the interpretation of administrative law when the financial impact of the law had not been considered by the agency, such as in Biden v. Nebraska, 600 U.S. 477 (2023), which blocked President Joe Biden's student loan forgiveness project under the HEROES Act for failing to account for its financial cost to states.

== Lower courts ==
Loper Bright Enterprises is a New Jersey–based family-owned herring fishing company operating in the waters of New England; the company estimated the cost of federal monitoring to be about $700 per day. In February 2020, Loper Bright filed a lawsuit in the United States District Court for the District of Columbia alleging that the MSA did not authorize the NMFS to mandate industry-funded monitoring of herring fisheries. The District Court, applying Chevron, granted summary judgment in favor of NMFS. Despite Chevron providing deference in the case of an ambiguously worded statute, the District Court found that the MSA unambiguously provides for industry-funded monitoring of the herring fishery, and thus concluded its analysis at the first step of Chevron. The Court acknowledged Loper Bright's arguments regarding ambiguity in the statutory language, but noted that even if these arguments successfully argued for ambiguity in the text, NMFS's interpretation of the MSA would have been a reasonable reading of the statute.

A three-judge panel of the United States Court of Appeals for the District of Columbia Circuit heard oral arguments in the case on February 8, 2022. The panel included then-Circuit Judge Ketanji Brown Jackson. Later that month, Jackson was nominated to replace Justice Stephen Breyer on the Supreme Court. Chief Judge Srinivasan was drawn to replace Justice Jackson after her confirmation. Despite hearing oral arguments, Justice Jackson took no part in the decision of the case.

The court affirmed the judgment of the district court. However, the Circuit Court did not rest its analysis at the first step of Chevron, concluding that the language of the MSA was not completely unambiguous about whether or not it provides for industry-funded monitoring of the herring fishery. Instead, they concluded their analysis at the second step of Chevron, stating that the NMFS reasonably interpreted the MSA when it came to what the Court deemed the "silence on the issue of cost of at-sea monitoring". Judge Justin R. Walker dissented.

== Supreme Court ==
On November 10, 2022, Loper Bright petitioned the Supreme Court to hear its case. In its petition for a writ of certiorari, Loper Bright presented two questions to the Court. First, it asked the Court to rule on whether granting the NMFS the power to require domestic vessels to pay the salaries of monitors it carries was based on a proper application of Chevron. Second, it asked the Court to rule on whether Chevron should be overruled outright, or at least limited in its scope. On May 1, 2023, the Court granted the petition, limited to the second question presented. Due to her prior involvement in the case, Justice Jackson recused herself from its proceedings. The Supreme Court later granted the petition to Relentless, Inc. v. Department of Commerce in October 2023, a closely related case originating out of the First Circuit also challenging the fees issued by the NMFS and Chevron deference, with which Justice Jackson had no conflict.

Loper Bright was heard alongside Relentless, Inc. on January 17, 2024. The cases were argued by Roman Martinez (on behalf of Relentless), Paul Clement (on behalf of Loper Bright Enterprises), and Solicitor General Elizabeth Prelogar (on behalf of the United States in both cases). Although Justice Jackson recused herself in the Loper Bright decision, she did hear arguments in the consolidated case, Relentless, Inc. The oral arguments and questions from the justices were centered largely around the role of the courts in policy interpretation, and what might happen to the courts should Chevron be overruled. Additionally, attention was given to the impact which overruling that precedent would have on certain industries, with healthcare being center-stage.

On June 28, 2024, the Supreme Court issued its decision striking down Chevron deference. Loper Bright was 6–2 with Justice Jackson excused and Relentless was 6–3. Chief Justice John Roberts wrote the majority opinion, which held that Chevron deference conflicted with the Administrative Procedure Act (APA) as "under the APA, it thus remains the responsibility of the court to decide whether the law means what the agency says." Justice Roberts continued that "Congress expects courts to handle technical statutory questions", and the judicial venues allows for additional input from interested parties via amicus briefs. Justice Roberts' opinion stated that prior administrative actions and court decisions decided under Chevron deference are not overturned by this decision, and in lieu of Chevron, agency interpretation can still be respected under the weaker Skidmore deference established in Skidmore v. Swift & Co. (1944). However, Justice Roberts said, the principle of stare decisis does not apply to Chevron deference in general as the court had been struggling to apply it over the last several years, making it unworkable. In the specifics of the Loper Bright case, the majority opinion also found that the 1976 Magnuson–Stevens Fishery Conservation and Management Act did not authorize officials to create industry-funded monitoring requirements.

Justice Thomas wrote a concurrence, stating that Chevron deference was inconsistent with both the APA as well as the separation of powers established in the Constitution. Justice Gorsuch also wrote a concurrence, stating "Today, the Court places a tombstone on Chevron no one can miss. In doing so, the Court returns judges to interpretative rules that have guided federal courts since the Nation’s founding." Justice Gorsuch further wrote that the only change in administrative law going forward is that federal courts should "resolve cases and controversies without any systemic bias in the government's favor."

Justice Elena Kagan wrote a dissenting opinion, which was joined by Justices Sonia Sotomayor and Ketanji Brown Jackson. Justice Kagan was critical of the majority's position with concern for the disruption that eliminating Chevron would create. She also wrote that while the majority may believe that agency decisions may still be respected by courts, "if the majority thinks that the same judges who argue today about where 'ambiguity' resides are not going to argue tomorrow about what 'respect' requires, I fear it will be gravely disappointed." Justice Kagan viewed the majority's decision as increasing the power of the Supreme Court at the expense of the other branches of government.

== Reactions ==
Loper Bright and SEC v. Jarkesy – which was decided the day prior and limited the ability of agencies to impose penalties through internal tribunals instead of jury trial in court – were seen as cumulation of the current Supreme Court's efforts to weaken the administrative state as part of a conservative agenda against big government.

Environmentalist organizations criticized the decision. The Southern Environmental Law Center issued a statement saying the ruling "shifts power to judges who do not have the expertise of agency staff who live and breathe the science, financial principles, and safety concerns that federal agencies specialize in". Vickie Patton of the Environmental Defense Fund warned that the decision "undermines vital protections for the American people at the behest of powerful polluters". The Nation's Elie Mystal wrote that the decision was "the biggest judicial power grab since 1803", as it can strip power given by Congress to the experts in the appropriate field of the executive branch and place it in the hands of the judiciary for agencies such as the Environmental Protection Agency, the Security and Exchange Commission, and the Occupational Safety and Health Administration.

Some commentators, including the dissenting justices, pointed out that the decision in Corner Post, Inc. v. Board of Governors of the Federal Reserve System could amplify the re-litigation of regulations given Chevron deference because it created a workaround for the six-year statute of limitations for lawsuits.

Administrative-law professors expressed varying opinions about the likely impact of the court's holding. Adrian Vermeule, Professor of Constitutional Law at Harvard, argued that "much or most of what was (somewhat misleadingly) called 'Chevron deference'" could "be recreated under a different label", pointing to language in the majority opinion acknowledging that Congress remains permitted to delegate interpretive authority to agencies via statute. Cass Sunstein, Vermeule's colleague at Harvard and former administrator of the Office of Information and Regulatory Affairs, stated this possibility but concluded that the decision would likely be more consequential, generating "a significant increase in ideological divisions in the lower courts".

In a congressional hearing on July 10, 2024, Representative Dan Goldman summarized the court's ruling, saying to EPA Administrator Michael S. Regan, "The Loper Bright ruling, as you know, said that the courts should not defer to agency rulemaking if a statute is ambiguous. And instead the courts get to determine whether or not what the statute means. Is that your understanding as well? So that would not require any regulations to be reversed or overturned, correct?" Regan indicated agreement.

Senator Elizabeth Warren led the introduction of the Stop Corporate Capture Act bill in July 2024 that aimed to codify Chevron deference into law and effectively reversing Loper Bright, in addition to increasing transparency and efficiency in the rule-making process.

== Impact ==
In 2024, citing the Supreme Court's ruling in Loper Bright, the Air Force refused to comply with an EPA order that they develop a cleanup plan for drinking water around Tucson, Arizona, after the region's groundwater was contaminated by Per- and polyfluoroalkyl substances (PFAS) runoff from nearby Air Force bases.

One of the first decisions reflecting Loper Bright was the Sixth Circuit decision to block net neutrality regulations by the Federal Communications Commission. While the FCC had previously been considered to have the ability to make such rulings under the Chevron deference as a result of National Cable & Telecommunications Ass'n v. Brand X Internet Services, the Sixth Circuit ruled in January 2025 that the FCC's rule making to support net neutrality was incompatible with the Telecommunications Act of 1996.

Vivek Ramaswamy asserted that DOGE could justify permanently erasing many rules that had been adopted prior to the ruling, calling the ruling a "once-in-a-generation opportunity".

== See also ==
- American Hospital Association v. Becerra
- McLaughlin Chiropractic Associates, Inc. v. McKesson Corp.
