= College of the State Bar of Texas =

Logo of the college of the State Bar of Texas

The College of the State Bar of Texas is an honorary society of qualified lawyers who are interested in both high ethical standards and improved training for all Texas attorneys.

== Purpose and membership ==
The college recognizes Texas lawyers who voluntarily attend at least double the minimum Continuing Legal Education (CLE) classes required by the State Bar of Texas. While the State Bar of Texas mandates that every licensed attorney complete at least fifteen hours of continuing legal education classes each year, the college requires its members to double that number by attending thirty hours per year.

As of 2006, it was the only organization in the United States formed for the specific purpose of promoting and recognizing attorneys who strive to maintain and enhance their professional skills and the quality of their practice through voluntary participation in CLE programs. Historically, only about eight percent of the licensed attorneys in Texas (4,100 out of 63,500 in 1999) meet the requirements for membership in the College of the State Bar of Texas. The motto of the college is: "Professionalism Through Education."

Since 1993, the College of the State Bar has each year presented a lawyer with the Jim Bowmer Professionalism Award, an annual honor established to recognize members who have significantly contributed to professionalism within the legal community, as well as a Franklin Jones Best CLE Article Award and a Steve Condos Most CLE Hours Award.

== History ==
Jim D. Bowmer and Franklin Jones Jr., both past presidents of the State Bar of Texas, credit each other with starting the College of the State Bar. Mr. Bowmer, who believed that lawyers in Texas should be given recognition for attending programs of continuing legal education, urged Mr. Jones to persuade the Board of Directors of the State Bar of Texas to adopt the idea for the college. At the request of the Board of the Directors of the State Bar of Texas, the college was established by the Texas Supreme Court on December 14, 1981.

In June 2001, the Board of the State Bar voted to change the status of the college from a standing committee of the Bar to a "bar-related entity." On October 25, 2001, the Texas Supreme Court amended its 1981 order establishing the College of the State Bar (Misc. Docket No. 01-9180) and directed it to pursue incorporation under the Texas Non-Profit Corporation Act. As a qualifying non-profit corporation, the college applied for and received Section 501(c)(3) tax-exempt status under the United States Internal Revenue Code.
