= Chevron U.S.A., Inc. v. Natural Resources Defense Council, Inc. =

Landmark decision of the US Supreme Court

Chevron U.S.A. v. Natural Res. Def. Council
- Supreme Court of the United States

Argued February 29, 1984 Decided June 25, 1984
- Full case name: Chevron U.S.A., Inc. v. Natural Resources Defense Council, Inc., et al.
- Docket nos.: 82-1005; 82-1247; 82-1591
- Citations: 467 U.S. 837 (more) 104 S. Ct. 2778; 81 L. Ed. 2d 694; 21 ERC (BNA) 1049; 14 Envtl. L. Rep. 20,507; 52 U.S.L.W. 4845; 1984 U.S. LEXIS 118
- Argument: Oral argument

Case history
- Prior: Natural Resources Defense Council v. Gorsuch, 685 F.2d 718 (D.C. Cir. 1982), cert. granted sub nom. Chevron U.S.A. Inc. v. Natural Resources Defense Council, Inc., 461 U.S. 956 (1983).
- Subsequent: Rehearing denied, 468 U.S. 1227 (1984).

Holding
- Courts must defer to administrative agency interpretations of the authority granted to them by Congress (1) where the intent of Congress was ambiguous and (2) where the interpretation was reasonable or permissible.

Court membership
- Chief Justice Warren E. Burger Associate Justices William J. Brennan Jr. · Byron White; Thurgood Marshall · Harry Blackmun; Lewis F. Powell Jr. · William Rehnquist; John P. Stevens · Sandra Day O'Connor

Case opinion
- Majority: Stevens, joined by Burger, Brennan, White, Blackmun, Powell
- Marshall, Rehnquist and O'Connor took no part in the consideration or decision of the case.

Laws applied
- Clean Air Act Amendments of 1977 (Pub. L. No. 95-95, 91 Stat. 685); 40 C.F.R. 51.18(j)(1)(i)-(ii) (1983)
- Overruled by
- Loper Bright Enterprises v. Raimondo (2024)

Chevron U.S.A., Inc. v. Natural Resources Defense Council, Inc., 467 U.S. 837 (1984), was a landmark decision of the Supreme Court of the United States that set forth the legal test used when U.S. federal courts must defer to a government agency's interpretation of a law or statute. The decision articulated a doctrine known as "Chevron deference". Chevron deference consisted of a two-part test that was deferential to government agencies: first, whether Congress has spoken directly to the precise issue at question, and second, "whether the agency's answer is based on a permissible construction of the statute".

The decision involved a legal challenge to a change in the U.S. government's interpretation of the word "source" in the Clean Air Act of 1963. The Act did not precisely define what constituted a "source" of air pollution. The Environmental Protection Agency (EPA) initially defined "source" to cover essentially any significant change or addition to a plant or factory. In 1981, the EPA changed its definition to mean only an entire plant or factory. This allowed companies to build new projects without going through the EPA's lengthy new review process if they simultaneously modified other parts of their plant to reduce emissions, avoiding any net change. Natural Resources Defense Council, an environmentalist advocacy group, challenged the legality of the EPA's new definition. NRDC won the case in a federal court, but the Supreme Court overturned that decision and ruled in favor of Chevron on the grounds that the courts should broadly defer to EPA and other independent regulatory agencies.

Chevron was one of the most important decisions in U.S. administrative law and was cited in thousands of cases. In June 2024, forty years later, the Supreme Court overruled Chevron in Loper Bright Enterprises v. Raimondo, on the grounds that it conflicts with the Administrative Procedure Act, reversing decades of administrative agency power to interpret ambiguous statutes and regulations. This ruling shifted interpretation authority from federal agencies to the courts, requiring them to decide the "best reading" of a law rather than deferring to an agency's interpretation, and impacting agencies like the EPA and OSHA.

== Background ==
=== Legal history ===
Under the Supreme Court's ruling in Marbury v. Madison, United States federal courts have the authority to judicially review the statutes enacted by Congress, and declare a statute invalid if it violates the Constitution. But the Constitution sets no express limits on how much federal authority can be delegated to a government agency. Rather, limits on the authority granted to a federal agency occur within the statutes enacted by Congress. It is also worth noting that federal courts are constitutionally of "limited jurisdiction". Congress bestowed on them the authority to adjudicate administrative matters in 1948.

In 1974, the Supreme Court stated that deference depends on an administrative interpretation being consistent with the agency's other statements and being consistent with the congressional purpose:

We have recognized previously that the weight of an administrative interpretation will depend, among other things, upon "its consistency with earlier and later pronouncements" of an agency. Skidmore v. Swift & Co., 323 U. S. 134, 140 (1944). See generally 1 K. Davis, Administrative Law Treatise §§ 5.03-5.06 (1958 ed. and Supp. 1970). ... In order for an agency interpretation to be granted deference, it must be consistent with the congressional purpose. Espinoza v. Farah Mfg. Co., 414 U. S. 86 (1973); Red Lion Broadcasting Co. v. FCC, 395 U. S. 367, 381 (1969).

=== Case background ===
In 1977, the U.S. Congress passed a bill that amended the Clean Air Act of 1963 to require any project that would create a major "stationary source" of air pollution to go through an elaborate new approval process conducted by the EPA called "new-source review". The EPA interpreted the word "source" in the new law to cover nearly any addition or change to a factory or plant. This meant that even a single building or machine, such as a smokestack or a boiler, could be a "source" of air pollution under the law.

In 1981, after Ronald Reagan became President, the EPA changed its interpretation of the word "source" in the law to mean only an entire plant or factory, not an individual building or machine. Under this new interpretation, a change at a plant or factory needed to go through the "new-source review" process only if it increased the total air-pollution emissions of the entire plant or factory. Any company that wished to build a project at a plant that would create new air pollution could avoid the "new-source review" process by simultaneously making other changes to the plant in order to reduce its overall emissions by the same amount. The EPA's new interpretation allowed companies to make industrial decisions more freely as long as the total impact of their plants or factories on air pollution did not increase. It made building industrial projects easier, even if the projects created new air pollution.

In late 1981, the environmental advocacy group Natural Resources Defense Council (NRDC) filed a petition for review in the U.S. Court of Appeals for the District of Columbia Circuit challenging the legality of the EPA's new interpretation. The D.C. Circuit ruled in the NRDC's favor in 1982. In an opinion written by U.S. circuit judge (and future Supreme Court justice) Ruth Bader Ginsburg, the D.C. Circuit ruled that the EPA's new interpretation of "source" conflicted with the Circuit's prior cases interpreting the term and that the EPA's new interpretation was invalid. Chevron Corporation, which had been affected by the EPA's new regulation and had intervened in the case, appealed the D.C. Circuit's decision to the Supreme Court.

== Decision ==
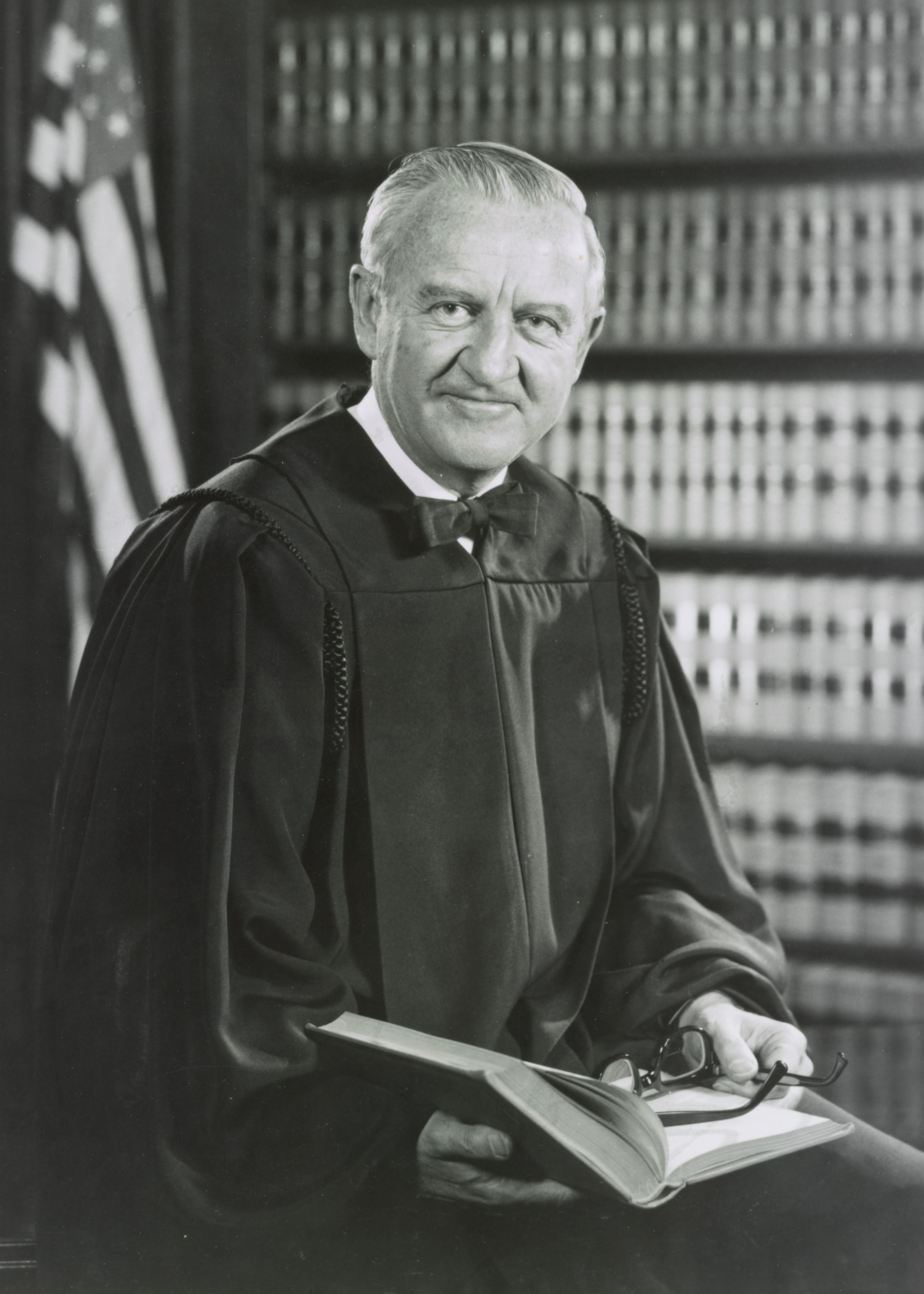
Justice John Paul Stevens, the author of the Court's opinion in Chevron

On June 25, 1984, the Supreme Court issued a unanimous 6–0 (Note: Justices Thurgood Marshall and William Rehnquist did not participate in the decision because of illnesses. Justice Sandra Day O'Connor had a financial interest in one of the parties and recused herself in order to avoid a conflict of interest.) decision in favor of the EPA that reversed the judgment of the D.C. Circuit.

In an opinion written by justice John Paul Stevens, the Court ruled that the ambiguous meaning of the term "source" in the Clean Air Act indicated that Congress had delegated to the EPA the power to make a "policy decision" and choose the meaning of "source". The Court admonished the D.C. Circuit for trying to set government policy on the regulation of air pollution emissions. The Court emphasized that the U.S. judiciary is not a political branch of government and that U.S. federal judges are not elected officials.

When a challenge to an agency construction of a statutory provision, fairly conceptualized, really centers on the wisdom of the agency's policy, rather than whether it is a reasonable choice within a gap left open by Congress, the challenge must fail. In such a case, federal judges—who have no constituency—have a duty to respect legitimate policy choices made by those who do. The responsibilities for assessing the wisdom of such policy choices and resolving the struggle between competing views of the public interest are not judicial ones: "Our Constitution vests such responsibilities in the political branches."

— Chevron, 467 U.S. at 866 (quoting Tenn. Valley Auth. v. Hill, 437 U.S. 153, 195 (1978)).

The Court said that when Congress passes a law that contains an ambiguity, the ambiguity may represent an implicit delegation of authority from Congress to the executive agency that implements the law. The Court explained that these delegations limit a federal court's ability to review the agency's interpretation of the law.

The power of an administrative agency to administer a congressionally created program necessarily requires the formulation of policy and the making of rules to fill any gap left, implicitly or explicitly, by Congress. If Congress has explicitly left a gap for the agency to fill, there is an express delegation of authority to the agency to elucidate a specific provision of the statute by regulation. Such legislative regulations are given controlling weight unless they are arbitrary, capricious, or manifestly contrary to the statute. Sometimes the legislative delegation to an agency on a particular question is implicit rather than explicit. In such a case, a court may not substitute its own construction of a statutory provision for a reasonable interpretation made by the administrator of an agency.

— Chevron, 467 U.S. at 843–44 (internal quotation marks, alterations, citations, and footnotes omitted).

The Court's decision set forth a two-step analysis for federal courts to use when adjudicating a challenge to an agency's interpretation of a law. This two-step analysis became known as "the Chevron doctrine".

First, always, is the question whether Congress has directly spoken to the precise question at issue. If the intent of Congress is clear, that is the end of the matter; for the court, as well as the agency, must give effect to the unambiguously expressed intent of Congress. If, however, the court determines Congress has not directly addressed the precise question at issue, the court does not simply impose its own construction on the statute . . . Rather, if the statute is silent or ambiguous with respect to the specific issue, the question for the court is whether the agency's answer is based on a permissible construction of the statute.

— Chevron, 467 U.S. at 842–43.

At the first step, the Chevron doctrine requires a court to evaluate whether a law is ambiguous. If the law is unambiguous, then the court must follow it. If the law is ambiguous, however, then the court must proceed to step two. At step two, the Chevron doctrine requires the court to evaluate whether the interpretation of the law that the executive agency proposes is "reasonable" or "permissible". If it is, then the court must accept the agency's interpretation. If it is not, only then may the court conduct its own interpretation of the law.

== Importance ==
Chevron became perhaps the most frequently cited case in American administrative law, but some scholars suggest that the decision has had little impact on the Supreme Court's jurisprudence and merely clarified the Court's existing approach. The ruling that the judiciary should defer to a federal agency's interpretation of ambiguous language from Congressional legislation relevant to the agency is often referred to as Chevron deference. Several of the EPA's rulings for emissions regulations, as well as the Federal Communications Commission's stance on net neutrality have been based on cases decided on Chevron deference.

In 2002, Chevron was able to invoke Chevron deference to win another case, Chevron U.S.A., Inc. v. Echazabal, 536 U.S. 73 (2002), before the Supreme Court. In a unanimous decision, the Court applied Chevron deference and upheld as reasonable an Equal Employment Opportunity Commission regulation, which allowed an employer to refuse to hire an applicant when the applicant's disability on the job would pose a "direct threat" to the applicant's own health.

Three 21st-century decisions of the Supreme Court may limit the scope of administrative agency actions that receive Chevron deference to agency decisions that have the "force of law". This new doctrine has sometimes been referred to as "Chevron step zero". Thus, for example, a regulation promulgated under the "notice and comment" provisions of § 553 of the Administrative Procedure Act would be likely to receive Chevron deference, but a letter sent by an agency, such as a US Securities and Exchange Commission (SEC) "no-action" letter, would not. However, an agency action that does not receive Chevron deference may still receive some degree of deference under the old standard of Skidmore v. Swift & Co., 323 U.S. 134 (1944). The majority in Christensen v. Harris County (2000) suggested that Chevron deference should apply to formal agency documents which have the force of law while Skidmore should apply to less formal agency documents in an attempt to draw a bright line for the question of "force of law" under Chevron step zero. In King v. Burwell (2015), the Supreme Court has suggested that Chevron deference may be inappropriate in regulatory actions of "deep economic and political significance", hinting at the possibility of substantially limiting, or even eliminating, the doctrine.

West Virginia v. EPA, 597 U.S. 697 (2022), established the first explicit use of the major questions doctrine by the Supreme Court, which is seen to further weaken Chevron deference. Under the major questions doctrine, rules and decisions made by executive branch agencies that are not explicitly defined by their Congressional mandate and may incur a significant economic or political cost raise major questions of the agency's authority, and thus can be deemed unlawful. Roberts wrote in the majority of West Virginia, "[O]ur precedent teaches that there are extraordinary cases ... in which the history and the breadth of authority that the agency has asserted and the economic and political significance of that assertion provide a reason to hesitate before concluding that Congress meant to confer such authority." Within the context of West Virginia, the major questions doctrine was applied to rule-making by the EPA to require existing power plants to implement "outside the fence" measures, beyond the scope of the power plant, to reduce emissions, as implementing these measures was considered costly. The major questions doctrine was further evoked in Biden v. Nebraska, 600 U.S. ___ (2023), which determined that the Department of Education did not have the authority to cancel hundreds of billions of dollars in federal student loans under the HEROES Act.

The Supreme Court heard arguments in the case Loper Bright Enterprises v. Raimondo in January 2024. The case deals with payment of observers from the National Marine Fisheries Service that travel with fishermen during their outings, which under the Service's rules, must be paid by the fishermen. The fisherman challenged this rule, which in lower courts was upheld based on Chevron deference, but has been argued by lawyers that oppose the use of Chevron as a means to challenge the validity of the rule. The petition for certiorari to the Court specifically questioned whether Chevron should be overturned, and it was. The Supreme Court overruled Chevron in the Loper Bright decision on a 6–3 vote issued June 28, 2024.

Some professors have suggested that the implications for medicine and public health as a result of overturning Chevron will be uncertainty and instability for agencies and industries, inviting legal challenges to any and all FDA, EPA and Centers for Medicare & Medicaid Services (CMS) determinations.

== Opposition ==
=== Federal ===
The United States House of Representatives in the 115th Congress passed a bill on January 11, 2017, called the "Regulatory Accountability Act of 2017", which, if made into law, would change the doctrine of Chevron deference. Supreme Court Justice Neil Gorsuch (son of Anne Gorsuch, who was head of EPA at the time of the events which led to the Chevron decision) has also written opinions against Chevron deference, with news commentators believing that Gorsuch might rule against Chevron deference on the Supreme Court.

In the U.S. Supreme Court case City of Arlington, Texas v. FCC, the dissent by Chief Justice Roberts joined by Justice Kennedy and Justice Alito objected to excessive Chevron deference to agencies:

My disagreement with the Court is fundamental. It is also easily expressed: A court should not defer to an agency until the court decides, on its own, that the agency is entitled to deference.

In Chevron U.S.A. Inc. v. Natural Resources Defense Council Inc., we established a test for reviewing "an agency's construction of the statute which it administers". 467 U.S. 837, 842, 104 S.Ct. 2778, 81 L.Ed.2d 694 (1984). If Congress has "directly spoken to the precise question at issue," we said, "that is the end of the matter." Ibid. A contrary agency interpretation must give way.

"It is emphatically the province and duty of the judicial department to say what the law is." Marbury v. Madison, 1 Cranch 137, 177, 2 L.Ed. 60 (1803). The rise of the modern administrative state has not changed that duty. Indeed, the Administrative Procedure Act, governing judicial review of most agency action, instructs reviewing courts to decide "all relevant questions of law". 5 U.S.C. § 706.

Likewise before joining the U.S. Supreme Court, 10th Circuit Judge Gorsuch in his concurrence in Gutierrez-Brizuela v. Lynch also objected to excessive Chevron deference to agencies:

Quite literally then, after this court declared the statutes' meaning and issued a final decision, an executive agency was permitted to (and did) tell us to reverse our decision like some sort of super court of appeals. If that doesn't qualify as an unconstitutional revision of a judicial declaration of the law by a political branch, I confess I begin to wonder whether we've forgotten what might.

In the Administrative Procedure Act (APA) Congress vested the courts with the power to "interpret ... statutory provisions" and overturn agency action inconsistent with those interpretations. 5 U.S.C. § 706.

For whatever the agency may be doing under Chevron, the problem remains that courts are not fulfilling their duty to interpret the law and declare invalid agency actions inconsistent with those interpretations in the cases and controversies that come before them. A duty expressly assigned to them by the APA and one often likely compelled by the Constitution itself. That's a problem for the judiciary. And it is a problem for the people whose liberties may now be impaired not by an independent decisionmaker seeking to declare the law's meaning as fairly as possible – the decisionmaker promised to them by law – but by an avowedly politicized administrative agent seeking to pursue whatever policy whim may rule the day.

Subsequently, in Waterkeeper Alliance v. EPA the Court did not defer to the agency's interpretation.

=== State ===
==== Arizona ====
At the state level, Arizona has statutorily overturned Chevron deference with respect to most of its own agencies. In April 2018, the state's governor Doug Ducey signed HB 2238 into law, which states in relevant part,

In a proceeding brought by or against the regulated party, the court shall decide all questions of law, including the interpretation of a constitutional or statutory provision or a rule adopted by an agency, without deference to any previous determination that may have been made on the question by the agency.

The bill explicitly exempts health care appeals and actions of agencies created by the state's Corporation Commission.

==== Florida ====
In November 2018, voters in Florida approved an amendment to the Florida State Constitution, which states,

In interpreting a state statute or rule, a state court or an officer hearing an administrative action pursuant to general law may not defer to an administrative agency's interpretation of such statute or rule, and must instead interpret such statute or rule de novo.

The amendment also stopped deference to agencies' interpretation of its own rules, ending Auer deference in the state.

==== Mississippi ====
The Mississippi Supreme Court judicially overturned Chevron deference at the state level in King v. Mississippi Military Department (2018).

==== North Carolina ====
The North Carolina Supreme Court has rejected Chevron deference, but the state agencies are still entitled to deference comparable to Skidmore deference. Nevertheless, some lower courts have continued to give agencies deference under Chevron.

==== Ohio ====
The Ohio Supreme Court judicially overturned Chevron deference at the state level in TWISM Enterprises v. State Board of Registration in 2023.

==== Wisconsin ====
The Wisconsin Supreme Court judicially overturned Chevron deference at the state level in Tetra Tech, Inc. v. Wisconsin Department of Revenue (2016). In 2018, Governor Scott Walker signed a bill prohibiting courts from deferring to agency interpretations, and thus codifying the end to deference in Wisconsin.

== See also ==
- List of United States Supreme Court cases, volume 467
- Loper Bright Enterprises v. Raimondo
- United States v. Mead Corp. (2001), a more recent case addressing the limits of Chevron deference and the deference to be afforded to informal rule making
